= Sima de los Huesos hominins =

Pre-Neanderthal population in Spain

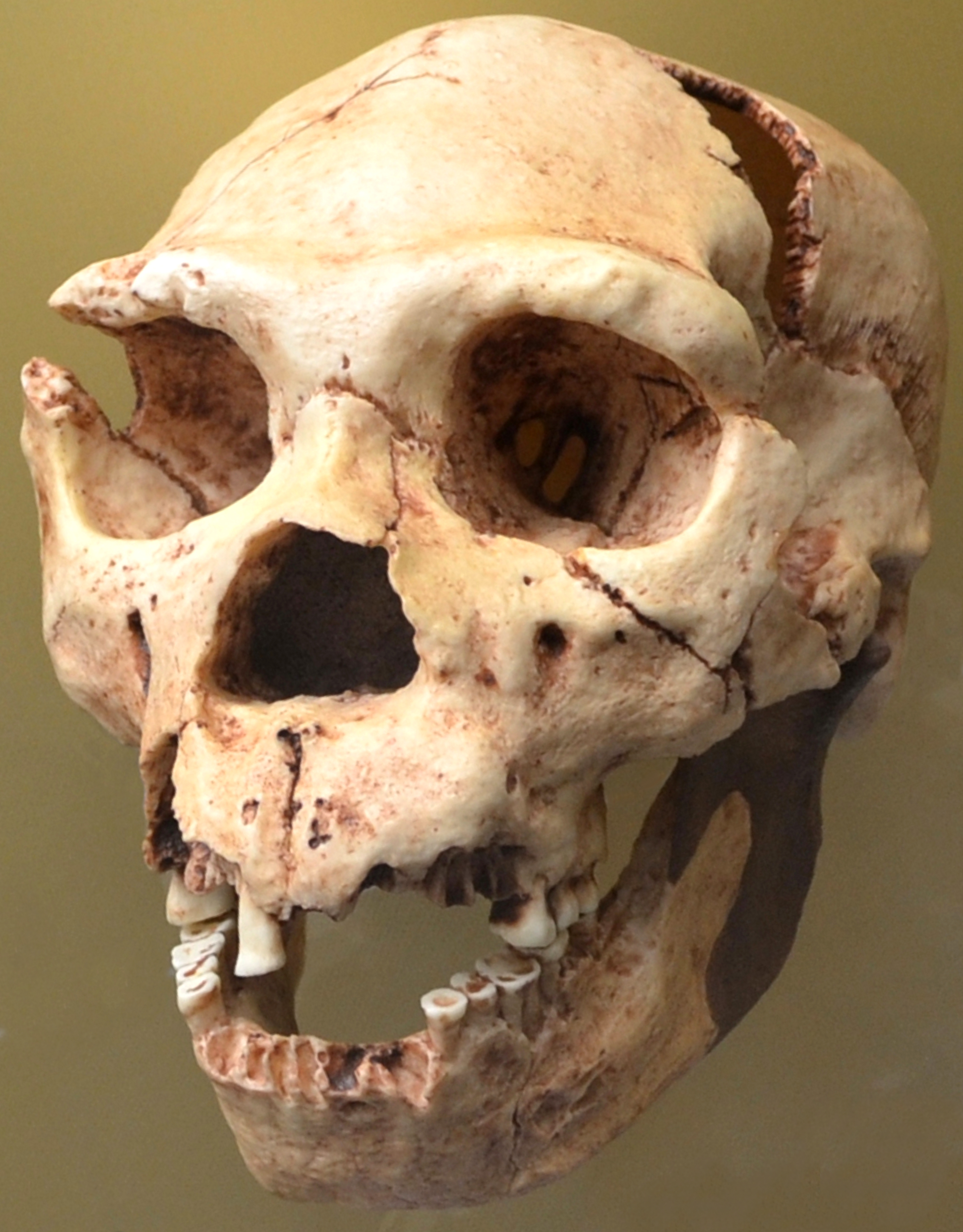
- Cranium 5 (Miguelón)
- Common name: Sima de los Huesos hominins
- Species: Pre-Neanderthal
- Age: 460–410 ka
- Place discovered: Archeological site of Atapuerca, Spain
- Date discovered: 1976
- Discovered by: Trinidad Torres

The Sima de los Huesos hominins are a 430,000-year-old population of pre-Neanderthals from the archeological site of Atapuerca, Spain. They are in the "Neanderthal clade", but fall outside Homo neanderthalensis. When first reported in 1993, these 29 individuals comprised about 80% of the human fossil record of the Middle Pleistocene. Every bone is preserved, and the unprecedented completeness of the remains sheds light on Neanderthal evolution, the classification of contemporary fossils, and variations in a single Middle Pleistocene population. Exhumation of the Sima de los Huesos hominins began in the 1980s under the direction of Emiliano Aguirre and, later, Juan Luis Arsuaga, Eudald Carbonell, and José María Bermúdez de Castro.

They have a mosaic of "classic" Neanderthal traits (apomorphies) and more "archaic" traits (plesiomorphies). Like Neanderthals, the brow ridges are inflated; the skull is not as robust in the rear, however, and has a pointed "house-like" profile instead of a rounded "bomb-like" one. Brain volume averages 1,241 cc (75.7 cu in), on the lower end of the Neanderthal range. The teeth are Neanderthal-like, with shovel-shaped incisors and taurodontism, but differ in cusp morphology. The chest and waist are broad and robust like Neanderthals, but the limbs are longer. They may have been large-bodied overall, like other archaic humans, with a height of about 170 cm (5 ft 7 in) and a weight of 90 kg (200 lb) in both sexes.

The Sima de los Huesos (bone pit) is a chamber in the Cueva Mayor–Cueva Silo cave complex at Atapuerca, and may have been a natural trap for the cave bear Ursus deningeri in particular. The Sima de los Huesos hominins may have been deposited in the pit by other humans, based on the quality of preservation and the predominance of adolescents and young adults over children and the elderly. All were buried at about the same time, and one individual may have been killed with a blunt tool. Some with severe health issues survived for a while, suggesting group care. Many individuals (especially adolescents) exhibited metabolic and nutritional diseases consistent with insufficient fat reserves during hibernation; any hibernation presumably lasted for four months.

This population produced Acheulean stone tools, as well as an industry apparently transitioning to the typically-Neanderthal Mousterian culture. They used these tools in butchering and hide- and woodworking, with the mouth as a third hand. The Sima de los Huesos hominins were buried with a single, large Acheulean handaxe, possibly a grave good with symbolic significance. Symbolic thought could indicate use of an early form of language. They may have been efficient hunters — possibly outcompeting local cave hyenas — who pursued deer, rhinoceros, horses, bison, and (sporadically) cave lions in an open woodland environment. They probably ate roots regularly, habitually squatted, and did not use fire.

== Research history ==
=== Discovery ===
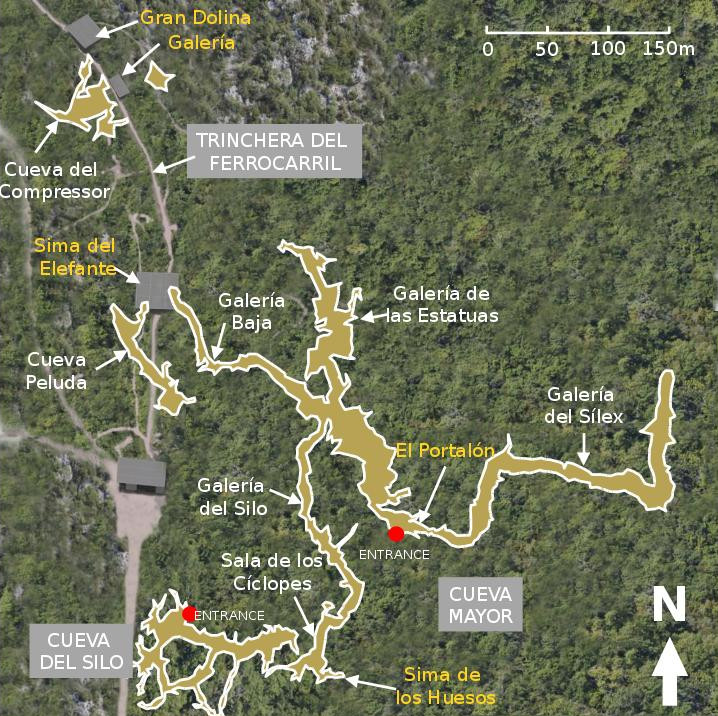
Map of the Cueva Mayor–Cueva Silo complex

Spanish engineers P. Sampayo and M. Zuaznávar published an 1868 monograph documenting the caves in the Atapuerca Mountains, noting reports of human fossils in one (Cueva Ciega). Spanish archeologists Jesús Carballo García and Saturio González discovered a cave painting of a horse in Cueva Mayor in 1910, and the area quickly attracted international interest. The eventually-abandoned construction of a railway supplied by material mined from what became known as the Trinchera del Ferrocarril (railway trench) revealed that the Cueva Mayor was part of a larger cave complex: the Cueva Mayor–Cueva Silo complex. Its archeological significance was first understood in 1962 after exploration by the Edelweiss Speleological Group, which identified several sites with Neolithic, Chalcolithic, and Bronze Age artifacts. Trinidad Torres unsuccessfully searched for bear fossils in the Trinchera del Ferrocarril while working on his doctoral thesis, but was pointed by the Edelweiss Spelaeological Group to the unmapped Sima de los Huesos (bone pit) in the Cueva Mayor–Cueva Silo complex. Sampayo and Zuaznávar had marked this as El Silo (storage pit), a chamber down a 13 m (43 ft) vertical shaft in the corner of the spacious Sala de los Cíclopes.

Torres sent four speleologists who identified a wealth of cave-bear fossils and a nearly-complete human-jaw fossil. He notified his PhD advisor, Emiliano Aguirre, who organized further digs. The Sima de los Huesos was difficult to access, low in oxygen and had been disturbed by many visitors over the decades looking for bear-fossil trophies, requiring much more excavation to remove the disturbed sediment (revuelto). In 1983, Aguirre found three fossil human teeth (and more bear fossils) in his brief visit to the Sima de los Huesos. Removal of sediment began the following year after lights and other necessary infrastructure were installed. In 1987, Aguirre's team installed suspended scaffolding over the floor of the Sima de los Huesos. Large sediment blocks were transported up the vertical shaft (the only entrance), carried from Cueva Mayor with backpacks, driven to the nearby Arlanzón River, dried, sieved, and sorted. The Atapuerca team under Aguirre had reconstructed three crania, one of which was nicknamed "Lazarus" (the first fossil from the site given a nickname).

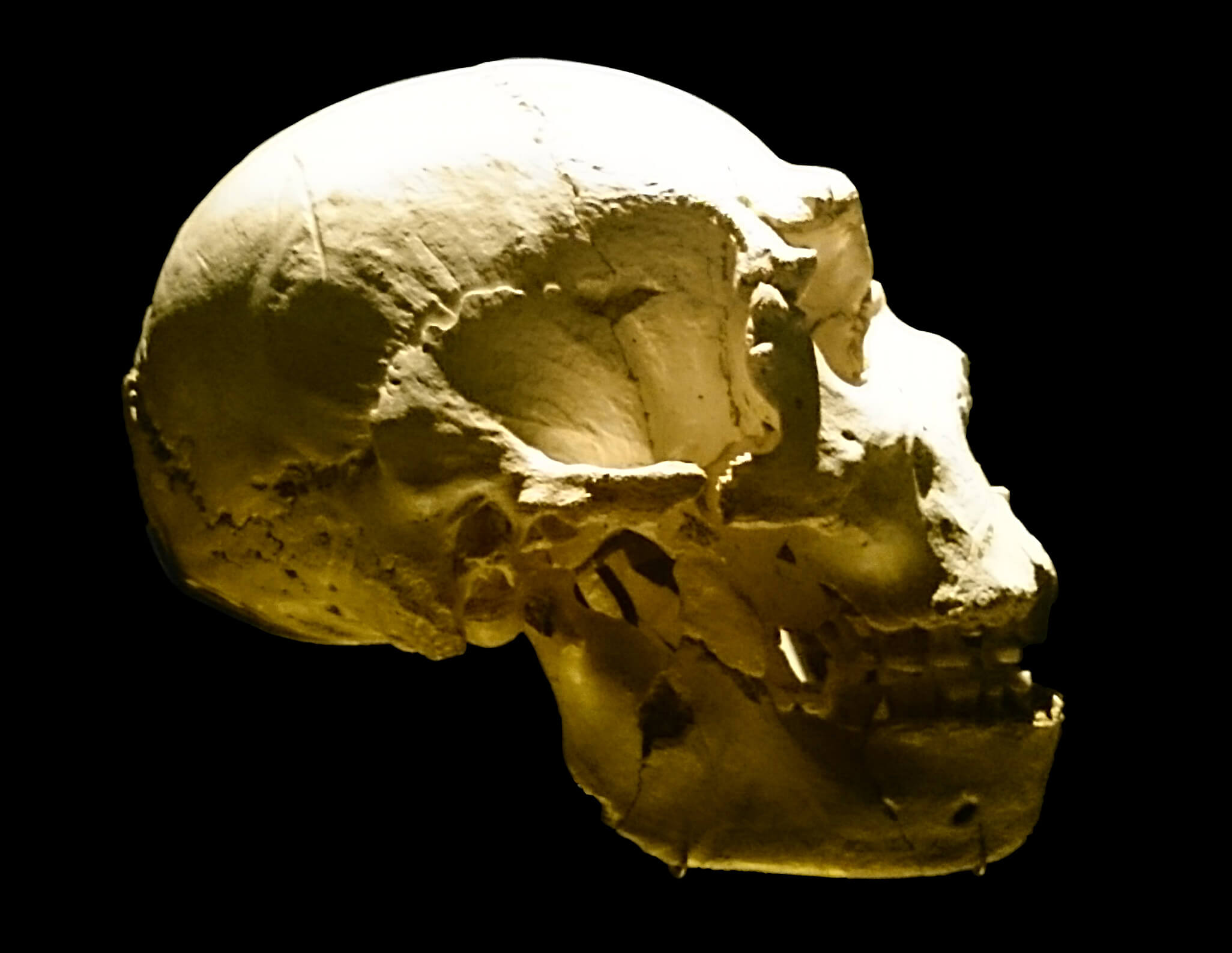
Miguelón is one of the best-preserved skulls in the human fossil record.

Aguirre retired in 1990, and left the excavation to his three team leads: Juan Luis Arsuaga, Eudald Carbonell, and José María Bermúdez de Castro. In 1992, a nearly-complete skull (nicknamed "Agamemnon") was found; at the time, only three other European skulls predating the Late Pleistocene had approached such a level of preservation: Swanscombe, Petralona, and Steinheim. Soon afterwards, another nearly-complete skull was discovered; it was nicknamed "Miguelón", after Spanish cyclist Miguel Indurain. It is one of the best preserved skulls in the human fossil record. In 1994, a nearly-complete pelvis ("Elvis") was discovered; at this time, the only similarly-preserved hominin pelvis predating the Late Pleistocene was the 3.2 million-year-old Lucy.

Over 7,000 human fossils and fragments have been recovered from the Sima de los Huesos since then, representing every bone in the skeleton. The material was first thought to be from 32 individuals, but it is more likely 29. It was the most complete sample of the Middle Pleistocene human fossil record from a single site in 1993, 80 percent of the global Middle Pleistocene human fossil record and 85 percent of Middle Pleistocene postcranial (body) fossils. A similarly-rich Middle Pleistocene human fossil collection was found in 2013 with the discovery of Homo naledi in South Africa. The Sima de los Huesos fossils illustrated the range of anatomical variation that could be present in a given population of Middle Pleistocene Europe across gender and age lines, clarifying the relationships among Middle Pleistocene European fossils and the evolution of Neanderthals. The archeological significance of the Sima de los Huesos and other sites in the cave complex led to the declaration by UNESCO of the archeological site of Atapuerca as a World Heritage Site on 30 November 2000. The city of Burgos, about 12 km (7.5 mi) east, opened the Museum of Human Evolution to commemorate its cultural heritage.

Sima de los Huesos individuals

Dental individual	Cranium (Note: By 2020, seven of the 17 crania could be confidently associated with the dental individuals.)	Sex	Age
I		F	Young adult
II			Immature (age 12.9–13.6 years)
III		F	Immature
IV		F	Middle-aged
V	15		Middle-aged
VI		F	Young adult
VII		M	Young adult
VIII		M	Young adult
IX			Immature
X		F	Immature
XI		F	Immature
XII		M	Young adult
XIII			Middle-aged
XIV			Immature
XV	17	F	Young adult
XVI	9	F	Immature (age 12.6–16.3)
XVII		M	Young adult
XVIII		M	Immature (age 8.7–12.8)
XIX		F	Young adult
XX	6	M	Immature (age 13.3–16.1)
XXI	5	M	Middle-aged
XXII		M	Young adult
XXIII	16	F	Immature (age 16–17)
XXIV		F	Immature (age 12.6–15.4)
XXV		F	Immature (age 9.6–15.4)
XXVI	10	F	Young adult
XXVII		M	Young adult
XXVIII		F	Young adult
XXIX		F	Immature

=== Age and stratigraphy ===
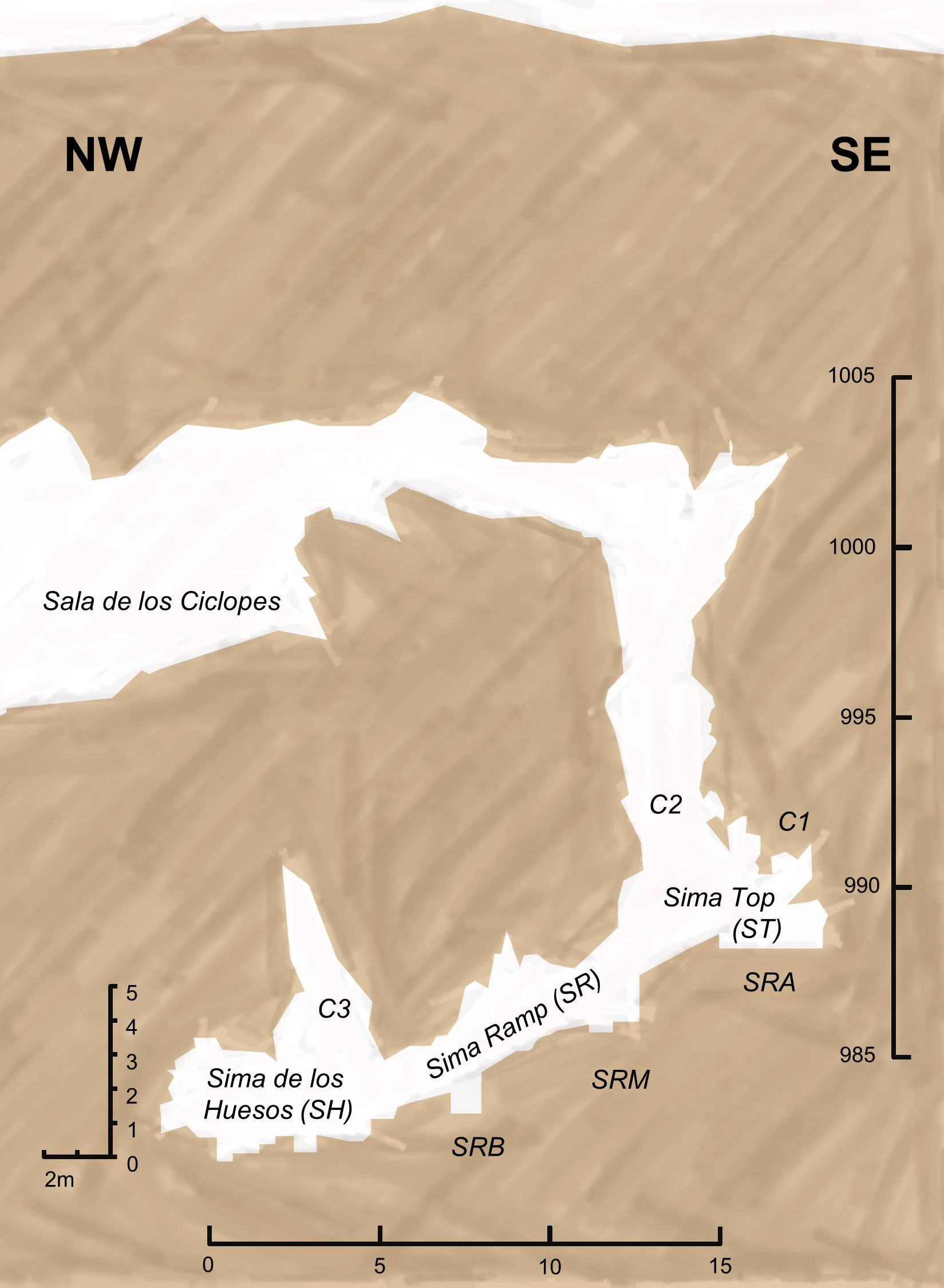
Cross-section of the Sima de los Huesos

The Cueva Mayor–Cueva Silo complex is the main cave system of the Atapuerca Mountains, extending over 3 km (1.9 mi) with three levels; Sima de los Huesos is on the lowest one. There are four entrances: Portalón (the entrance to Cueva Mayor) and Galería de las Estatuas on the first level, Sima del Elefante on the second, and Cueva del Silo on the third. Cueva del Silo is the nearest entrance to Sima de los Huesos, via the large Sala de los Cíclopes.

The Sima de los Huesos is 30 m (98 ft) underground, and 500 m (1,600 ft) from the entrance to Cueva Mayor. It is 18 m (59 ft) long east-to-west, with a mostly horizontal segment (Sima Top), a 30-degree ramp (Sima Ramp) running down 9 m (30 ft), and another horizontal segment (Sima de los Huesos). The cave infill is divided into 12 lithostratigraphic units (LU). The ramp has three pits where fossils were collected: Alta (SRA), Media (SRM), and Baja (SRB). There are three chimneys: Chimney 1 between Alta and Sima Top, Chimney 2 between Media and Alta, and Chimney 3 above Sima de los Huesos. Only Chimney 2 is open, leading into the Sala de los Cíclopes on the west and a low inclined conduit on the east. It is the only entrance. Most of the human and carnivore fossils come from a 4 m × 8 m (13 ft × 26 ft) section on the north side near the base of the ramp, in Sima de los Huesos. Over 100 human fossils were also found along the ramp. A few human fossils were recovered from where an eroded area, which were probably moved.

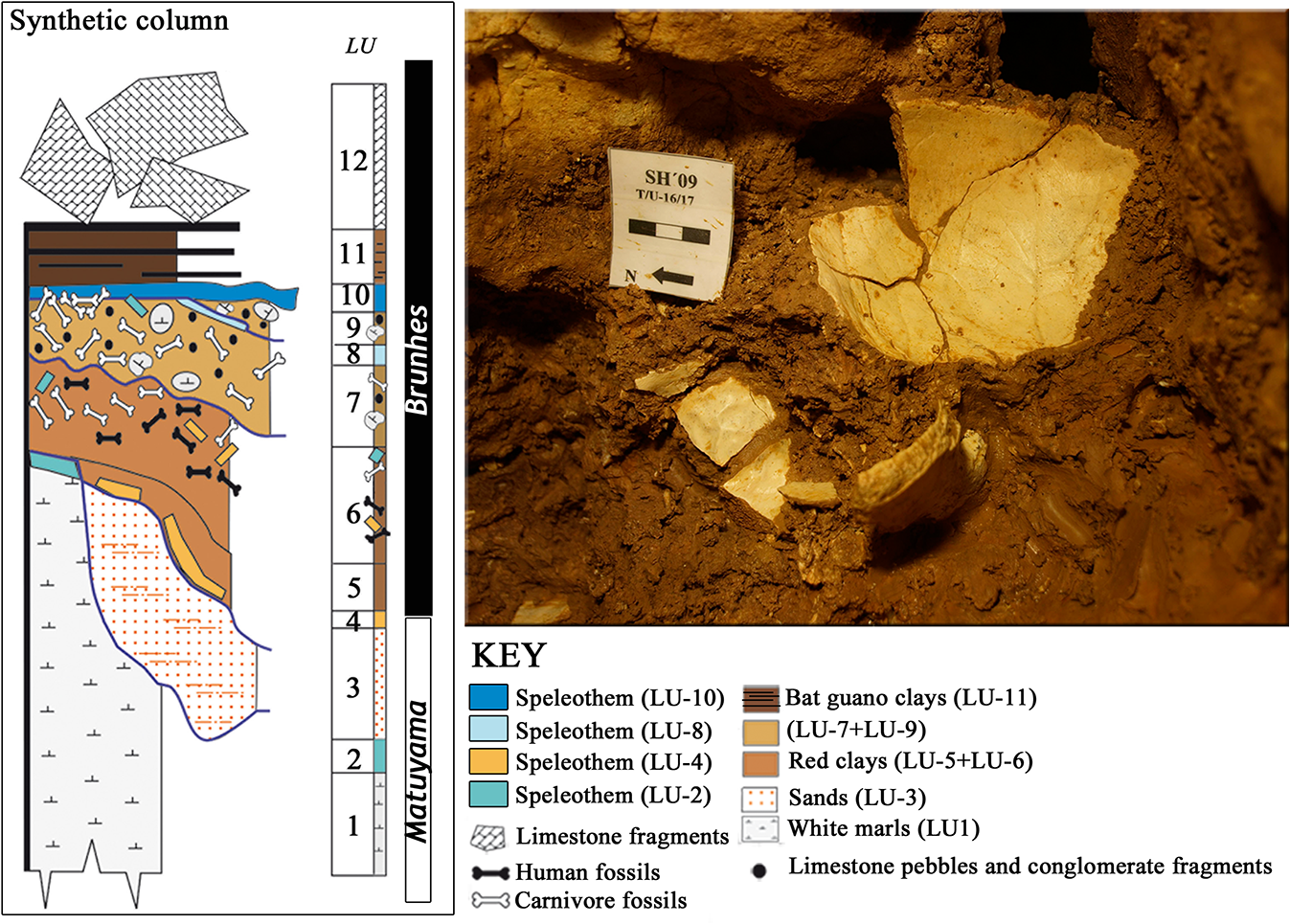
Stratigraphy of the Sima de los Huesos

LU-6 is a red clay layer of variable thickness, up to 50 cm (1 ft 8 in). It is over 80 percent phyllosilicates, of which more than 60 percent is illite which is weakly magnetic. Paleomagnetic dating of the illite indicates that the layer is younger than the Brunhes–Matuyama reversal (when the Earth's magnetic field last experienced a geomagnetic reversal), about 780,000 years ago. The fossils are mixed with pieces of limestone, speleothems (mineral deposits, probably moved from LU-2 and 4), marl clay chips (possibly from LU-1), and sometimes laminated mud rich in manganese dioxide, forming a bone breccia. There are also in situ (not moved) speleothems made of calcite rafts formed from undisturbed, seasonal pools of water; uranium–thorium dating of the rafts suggests a minimum age of 410,000–460,000 years (probably about 430,000 years ago). The overlying LU-7 is dated to 428,000 ± 27,000 to 441,000 ± 25,000, or 396,000 ± 35,000 to 429,000 ± 32,000 years ago, based on luminescence dating of orthoclase and quartz respectively. Luminescence dating of quartz grains from the underlying red clay suggests a maximum age of 448,000 ± 15,000 years ago.

The human material probably represents a single population. Limited carnivore damage suggests that the human fossils were largely inaccessible after burial. Only Chimneys 1 and 2 (via the inclined ramp) may have been open to the surface at the time of deposit, acting as natural traps for cave bears (Ursus deningeri) in particular. The humans may have been intentionally cast down, and the corpses and bones probably slid slowly down the ramp and collected at the bottom.

Similar fossils have also been recovered from the GII and GIII layers of Trinchera Galería (a partial adult mandible with two molars and an adult braincase fragment, respectively) about 2 km (1.2 mi) from the Sima de los Huesos. This sequence extends continuously from 408,000–598,000 to 221,000–269,000 years ago. The roughly 300,000-year-old Trinchera Dolina 10.1 layer in the Gran Dolina, about 50 m (160 ft) north of Galería, has a rich lithic assemblage and were probably occupied by a population similar to the Sima de los Huesos hominins.

=== Classification ===
In a 1993 preliminary report of the human fossil discoveries from Sima de los Huesos (about 700 fossils at the time, representing the entire skeleton), Arsuaga and colleagues noted many Neanderthal traits (apomorphies) and characterized the material as an early stage of Neanderthal evolution. When the Sima de los Huesos fossils were discovered, Middle Pleistocene European and African fossils were usually classified as Homo heidelbergensis: a wide-ranging species which was considered the last common ancestor of modern humans and Neanderthals. Arsuaga and colleagues believed that Europe was more isolated from Africa, identified the one-million-year-old Homo antecessor (from the Gran Dolina) as the last common ancestor, and characterized every Middle Pleistocene European fossil as part of a single population (H. heidelbergensis) ancestral to Neanderthals. British physical anthropologist Chris Stringer suggested classifying the Sima de los Huesos hominins as archaic Neanderthals in 2002, but conceded they could be an extremely-late H. heidelbergensis group. Arsuaga and colleagues failed to identify Neanderthal apomorphies in the holotype specimen of H. heidelbergensis (the jawbone Mauer 1) in 2011, and questioned the applicability of heidelbergensis to specimens with Neanderthal apomorphies. In 2012, Stringer reaffirmed that the Sima de los Huesos hominins should be moved from H. heidelbergensis to H. neanderthalensis. Two years later, Arsuaga and colleagues agreed with Stringer (recognizing two distinct groups in Middle Pleistocene Europe) but were unsure whether species or subspecies distinction from H. neanderthalensis was more appropriate.

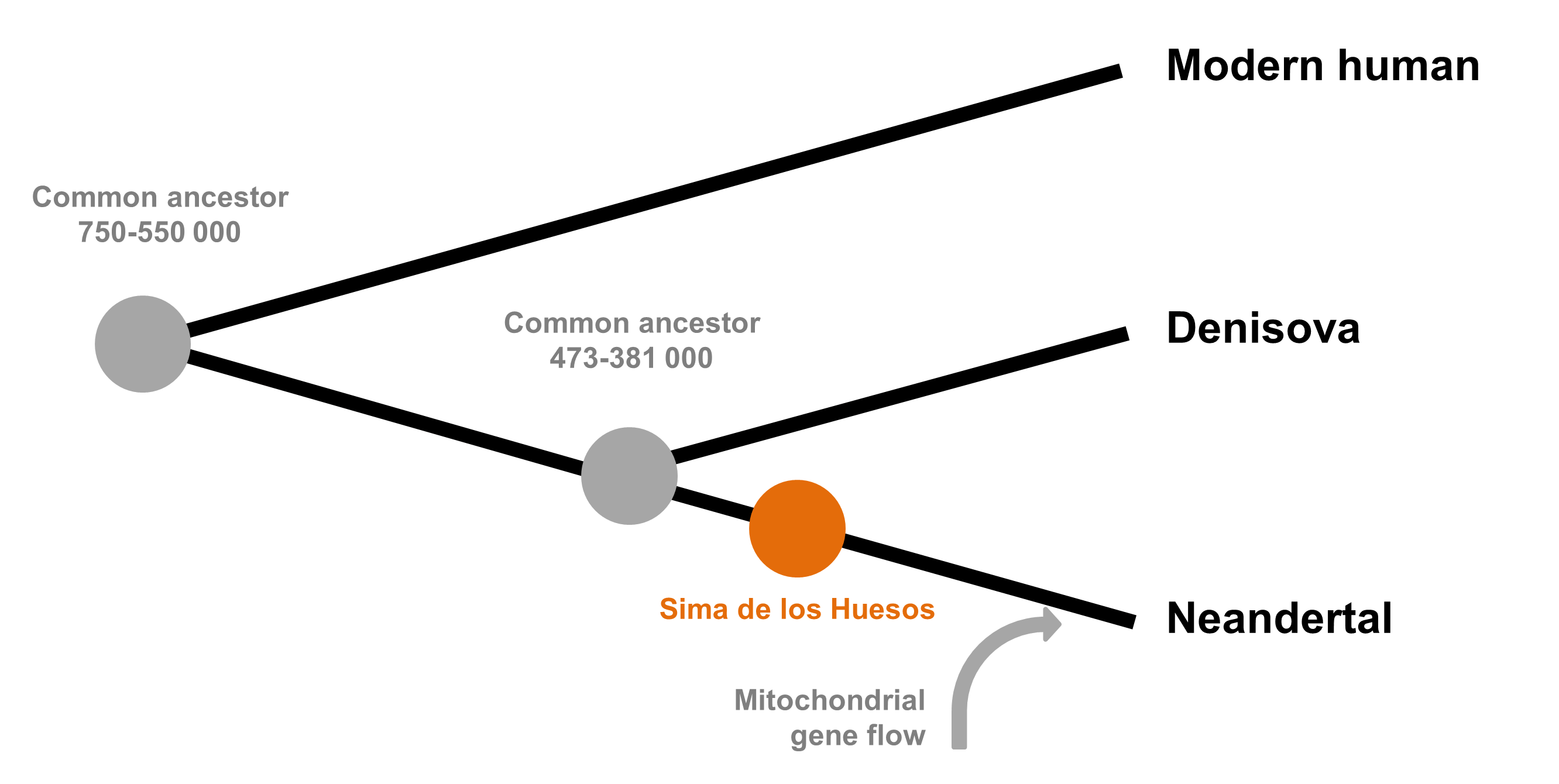
Reconstruction of human lineages with the Sima de los Huesos hominins

Mitochondrial DNA (mtDNA) was extracted from Femur XIII in 2014 which suggested that the individual shares a closer common ancestor with Central Asian Denisovans (the sister group of Neanderthals) than with Neanderthals. In 2016, however, nuclear DNA (nDNA) analysis concluded that the Sima de los Huesos hominins are more closely related to (but are not) Neanderthals. Because mtDNA is passed from mother to child, the Sima de los Huesos hominins may carry the ancestral Neanderthal-Denisovan ("Neandersovan") mtDNA lineage which was later replaced in Neanderthals by interbreeding with African migrants.

Discoveries of complete mandibles at the Sima de los Huesos site indicate a clear distinction from Mauer 1. Although the Sima de los Huesos cranial and mandibular anatomy has developed most of the Neanderthal apomorphies (the earliest appearance for many of them in the fossil record), the rest of the skeleton retains many ancestral features (plesiomorphies); nDNA indicates that they are a distinct group firmly nested in the Neanderthal clade. Their anatomy also suggests that many Neanderthal apomorphies evolved by the mid-Middle Pleistocene; the rest appeared later, near the beginning of the Late Pleistocene, possibly associated with the full speciation of H. neanderthalensis.

The Sima de los Huesos hominins can be grouped as pre-Neanderthals with specimens from Montamaurin-La Niche, Pontnewydd, Steinheim, Swanscombe, and Aroeira. This group may ultimately descend from a Near Eastern source population which dispersed across Europe in the mid-Middle Pleistocene, possibly the one at the contemporaneous Israeli Qesem Cave, (Note: Dental similarities with Neanderthals are also present in contemporaneous North African Middle Pleistocene fossils and the later Israeli Skhul and Qafzeh hominins. Although Qesem could be a sub-population of the Neanderthal clade, it is possible that Qesem represents a separate Southwest Asian population. Qesem is culturally distinct from Europe and Africa, producing the Levantine Acheulo-Yabrudian complex.) which is dentally similar to the Sima de los Huesos hominins. Their timing might coincide with the end of a major glaciation event during Marine Isotope Stage 12 (the Elster-Mindel-Anglian glaciation) about 450,000 years ago, during the warm interglacial period of Marine Isotope Stage 11. These pre-Neanderthals give way to early Neanderthals by the end of Marine Isotope Stage 7 (the Penultimate Glacial Period). Early Neanderthals are differentiated by a combination of derived and original Neanderthal traits, and are succeeded by late or classic Neanderthals by the end of Marine Isotope Stage 5e (the Last Interglacial).

== Skeleton ==
=== Skull ===
==== Cranial vault ====
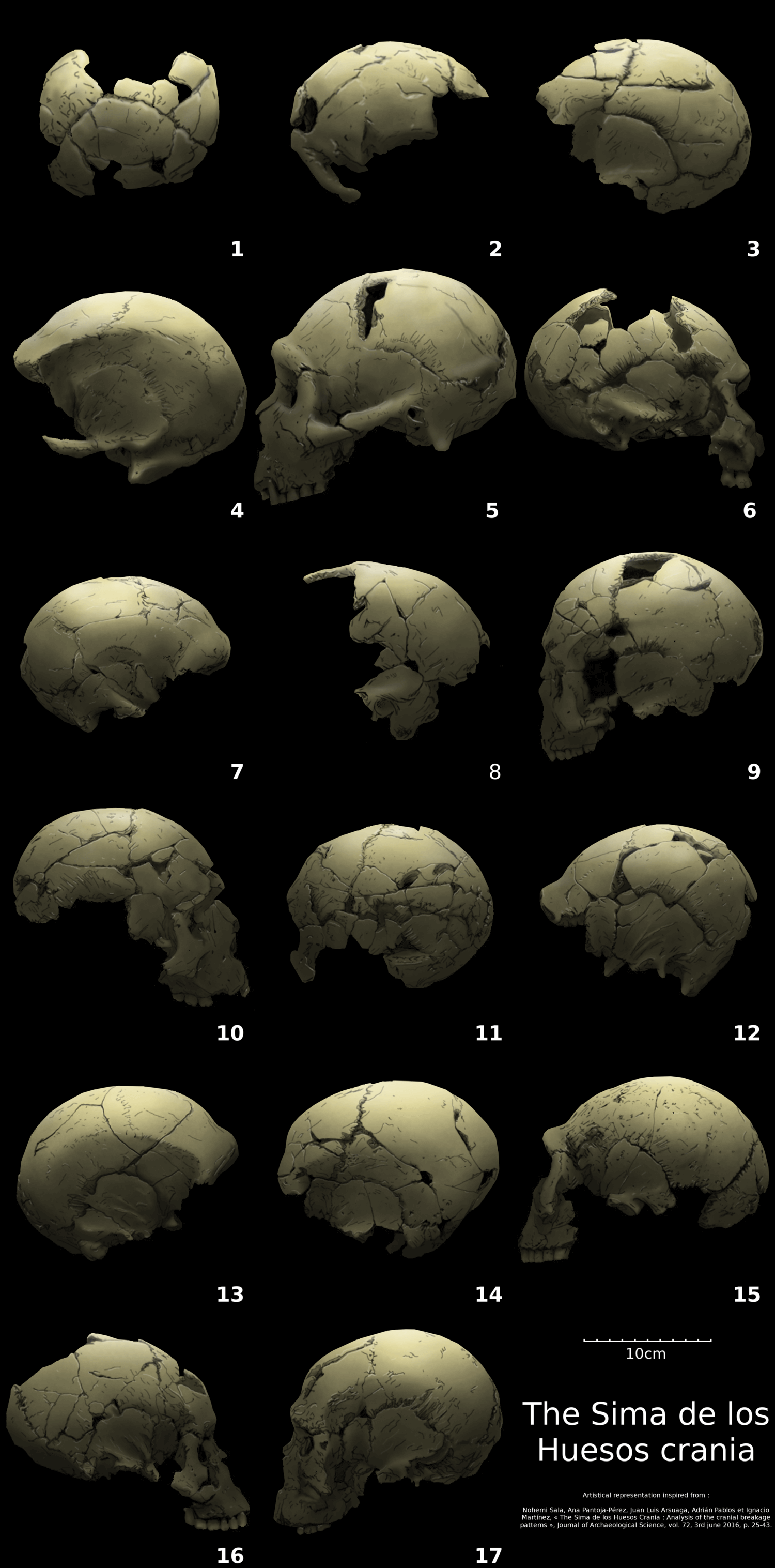
Artist's depiction of the 17 Sima de los Huesos crania

The Sima de los Huesos material includes 17 skulls. Compared to Neanderthals, the occipital bone (back of the skull) is less curved and lacks the characteristic occipital bun. Like modern humans and Neanderthals (and unlike H. erectus), the opisthocranion (the farthest-back point of the skull) is above the superior nuchal line. The opisthocranion is at the peak of a flat, or slightly convex, semicircular area which extends down to the inion; the area is dotted with circular pits (cratered) that became smaller and more dense with age. In Neanderthals, this area is characteristically sunken and smaller; it is a variable trait in Middle Pleistocene specimens. Below this area is an occipital torus (a horizontal bulge of bone projecting from the occipital bone), much weaker than in Neanderthals. The torus is most noticeable near the center of the occipital bone, and terminates before reaching the asterion (where the occipital bone connects with the parietal and temporal bones). The Swanscombe Skull has a similar occipital morphology, but its torus extends farther (like Neanderthals).

When the skull is viewed from the back, its sidewalls are parallel and form a shallow sagittal keel running along the midline of the skull (a house-like contour) like other European Middle Pleistocene specimens. The contour of H. erectus converges more strongly at the top (tent-like), and in Neanderthals it is rounded (bomb-like). Like Neanderthals but unlike many Middle Pleistocene specimens, the brow ridge (supraorbital torus) is double-arched instead of a single, straight bar. The arches are not divided, but some specimens have a depression on the glabella (between the brows). When viewed from the top, the skull projects farthest around the glabella.

==== Brain ====
The average brain volume for the 15 Sima de los Huesos skulls for which a metric is calculable is 1,241 cc (75.7 cu in), ranging from 1,057 to 1,436 cc (64.5 to 87.6 cu in). The average is comparable to other Middle Pleistocene non-erectus specimens, which are known to range from 1,165 to 1,325 cc (71.1 to 80.9 cu in), and on the lower end of the range for Neanderthals, which are known to range from 1,172 to 1,740 cc (71.5 to 106.2 cu in).

Like other archaic humans, the parietal lobe was proportionally smaller than in modern humans. Compared to Neanderthals, the Sima de los Huesos brain was generally broader (especially towards the back, though this probably does not relate to function). The encephalic rostrum (the front of the corpus callosum) was more expanded than in H. erectus, but thinner and narrower than in Neanderthals. The left hemisphere is typically bigger than the right in Neanderthals and modern humans, related to an expanded Broca's area associated with language acquisition; in the Sima de los Huesos hominins, brain asymmetry is variable. Like Neanderthals, the temporal lobe (associated with visual and olfactory memory) is narrow. The occipital lobe (the visual cortex) is larger than in modern humans but much smaller than Neanderthals.

==== Face ====
The mid-face (the nose and above) exhibits prognathism (juts out) to a similar degree as other Middle Pleistocene specimens, but not as much as Neanderthals. The face and nose are much wider than Neanderthals, and the cheeks are higher. Like Neanderthals and most modern humans but unlike H. erectus, the bottom rim of the piriform aperture (nose hole) is raised. As in Neanderthals (though to a lesser degree), the anterior nasal spine and inferior nasal concha at the base of the piriform aperature are fused; the lateral crests are well-defined, extending to (and connecting with) the nasal spine. Unlike Neanderthals, the floor of the nasal cavity is flat instead of sloping.

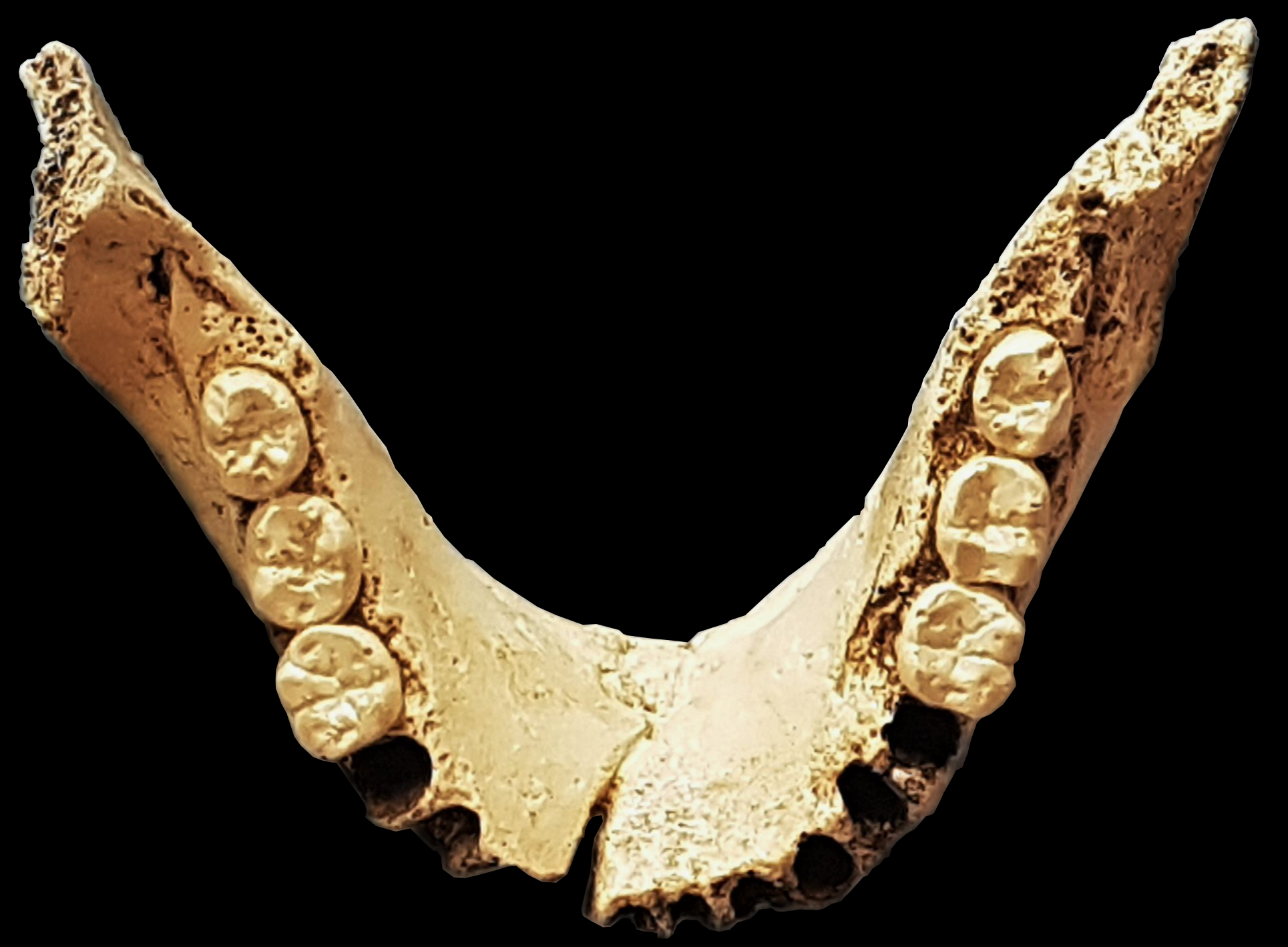
The first human fossil discovered at Sima de los Huesos in 1976 was this jawbone.

Dental and jaw anatomy is generally Neanderthal-like, and the regions of the temporal bone that are functionally relevant to chewing align closely with Neanderthals. The tooth rows are square-shaped, like the Petralona skull and some Neanderthals. The mandible is primarily Neanderthal-like, but has multiple mental foramina, a high mylohyoid line at the level of the third molar, and a more vertical and developed chin. The (presumed) female jaws are much smaller and have smoother muscle attachments, especially at the gonoid and coronoid process of the mandible. This degree of sexual dimorphism is larger than in modern humans.

The upper teeth are Neanderthal-like, with large and strongly shovel-shaped incisors and canines and taurodontism in the molars. Tubercles, far more common on Neanderthal teeth, are infrequently found on the incisors, canines, and molars (the cusp of Carabelli). The back teeth are smaller and less complex than in most other archaic humans, and more similar to recent humans. The lower incisors and canines have somewhat weaker shoveling than in Neanderthals. The morphology of the lower premolars and molars are Neanderthal-like, with greater variation in cusp size and shape.

=== Size ===
Like other archaic populations, the Sima de los Huesos hominins seem to have had much heavier skeletons than modern humans; this supported greater muscle mass and an overall heavier build. The skeletal weight of the Sima de los Huesos hominins may have been about 36 percent greater than that of modern humans.

Based on 19 complete male and 5 complete female long bones (sex assignment based on bone size), average adult height was rather tall for archaic humans: 169.5 and 157.7 cm (5 ft 7 in and 5 ft 2 in), respectively. Sexing the femora by anatomic landmarks reassigns some of the assumed-male femora as female, with one possibly-female femur (FXIII) belonging to someone weighing 88 kg (194 lb). Large female body size may not have been uncommon in archaic humans.

The body mass of the complete male Pelvis 1 ("Elvis") may have belonged to someone 90.3 to 92.5 kg (199 to 204 lb) in weight, possibly up to 100 kg (220 lb). "Elvis" has one of the highest estimated weights of an archaic human.

Based on the tarsus, average height was about 174 cm (5 ft 9 in) for males and 162 cm (5 ft 4 in) for females, with an average weight of 70 kg (150 lb). The highest weight estimate is 89.2–92.2 kg (197–203 lb), similar to "Elvis". Based on metatarsals and phalanges, average size was 175 and 174 cm (5 ft 9 in and 5 ft 9 in) and 80 and 77 kg (176 and 170 lb) for males and females, respectively. Middle Pleistocene height estimates range from 165 to 170 cm (5 ft 5 in to 5 ft 7 in) — with a few taller individuals — and Neanderthals were slightly shorter on average.

=== Postcranium ===
Before the discovery of the Sima de los Huesos hominins, characterization of the Early and Middle Pleistocene human body plan was based almost exclusively on the Kenyan Turkana Boy. This specimen was originally reconstructed to resemble the narrower modern-human body plan rather than the stockier Neanderthal body plan (which has been questioned with more fossil discoveries), implying that the Neanderthal body plan was a presumed adaptation to cold climates. Every bone in the human skeleton is represented by the Sima de los Huesos material, and postcranial remains are about half of the material.

==== Torso ====
The rib material is largely fragmented, with only a complete 1st, 11th, and 12th rib identified. Because the first rib is thicker dorsoventrally (front-to-back) and the pelvis is bigger anteroposteriorly (front-to-back) and mediolaterally (left-to-right) than in modern humans and Neanderthals, the Sima de los Huesos hominins may have had an expanded thorax (chest) like Neanderthals. A wide thorax and pelvis may have been an ancestral condition for humans, but this is difficult to ascertain because few postcranial remains predate the Late Pleistocene.

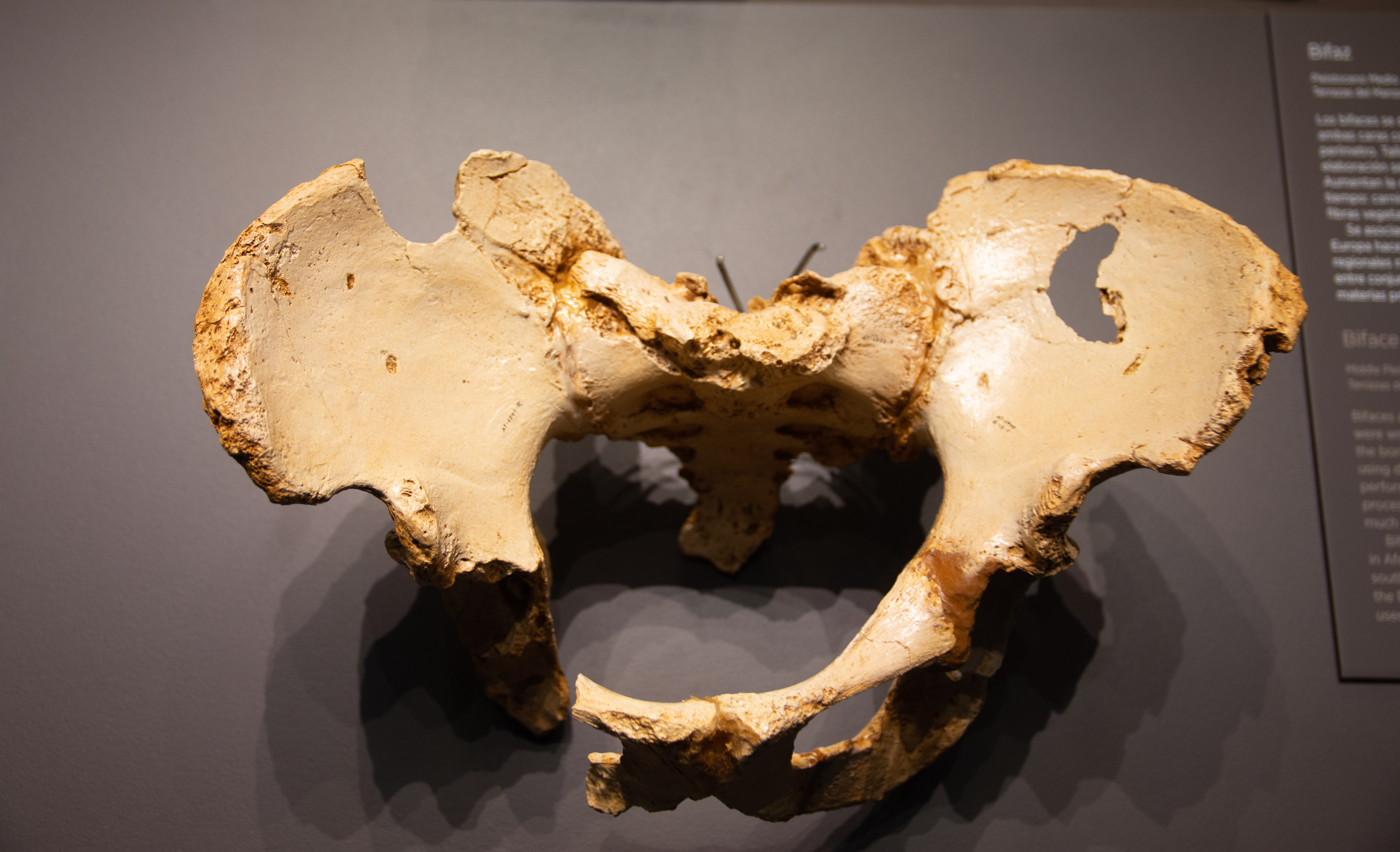
"Elvis", the pelvis

The pelvic cavity of "Elvis" (a male) is so wide that a modern human baby would be able to pass through it; a female's would have been even wider. This could indicate that the Sima de los Huesos hominins were born with a larger head and brain volume. A broad pelvis would impede abduction at the hip joint, and was offset by a flaring iliac crest and a long femoral neck. This would still have made movement more energetically expensive, especially over long distances, than for modern humans.

The atlas (first neck vertebra) is wide dorsoventrally, like in Neanderthals (probably related to the large foramen magnum, where the spine connects to the skull); the axis is shortened top to bottom. The atlanto-axial joint (between the atlas and axis, important in rotating the neck) is mediolaterally expanded. Like other archaic humans, the spinous process (jutting out of the vertebra) of the sixth and seventh neck vertebrae are long and horizontal (although it is shorter and more inclined than in Neanderthals). The shorter, more stable neck of Neanderthals and the Sima de los Huesos hominins could be related to balance with the broad chest and pelvis; the semicircular canals in the inner ear (which affect balance) are similar to those of Neanderthals, but the posterior canal is lower and the anterior canal does not have the same degree of torsion. If functional, the differences could be related to the larger average body size of the Sima de los Huesos hominins.

Like Neanderthals, the lumbar vertebrae (lower spine) exhibit lumbar hypolordosis (a flatter lower back) than modern humans. Like modern humans, Turkana Boy, and the australopithecine Paranthropus robustus, the transverse processes jut out of the vertebra dorsolaterally (from the sides, angled back); dorsal (back) orientation is not seen in Neanderthals.

==== Limbs ====
There is a sulcus (groove) on the dorsal side of the axillary border of almost all the shoulder blades (by the armpit, as in Neanderthals), as opposed to the ventral sulcus of all other hominin specimens. This could have functional implications for the mobility and structure of the shoulder joint. The glenoid fossa (where the shoulder blade joins the humerus) is taller and narrower than modern humans. Like in Neanderthals, the head of the humerus has an oval cross-section, the lesser tubercle is bigger, the deltoid tuberosity is narrower, the bone of the shaft is thicker, and the olecranon fossa (which connects with the ulna) is broader and deeper. The ulna and radius are usually characteristically Neanderthal (providing a mechanical advantage in rotating the forearm), but some instead fall within the range of variation of modern humans, implying Neanderthals lost some variability here. The ulna and radius are longer than in Neanderthals. The hand is well-adapted for mobility and a precision-grip, like Neanderthals and modern humans.

The femur has a flattened neck like other archaic humans; its shaft is mediolaterally expanded near the top, the neck-to-shaft angle is low, the gluteal tuberosity is large, there is not a true pilaster (a vertical ridge unique to modern humans), and the bone is thicker. These differences may be related to supporting the heavier, more robust archaic skeleton, and compensating for the broad pelvis. Like Neanderthals, the patella (kneecap) has deeper articular surfaces which could be related to stability. The articular surfaces of the tibia are flat (like Neanderthals), and the proximal epiphysis (at the knee) has a large retroversion angle (backward rotation) which would have stabilized the knee during intense activity. Habitual squatting is evidenced by hypertrophy (enlargement) of the medial malleolus (ankle bone) and wearing near the ankle on about one-fourth of the tibiae. The tibial pilaster is robust, which is only seen in the 400,000-year-old English Boxgrove Man. Compared to Neanderthals, the tibiae are proportionally longer (more similar to modern humans). Longer legs would mean they were more energetically efficient while walking than Neanderthals, but the quadriceps muscle had less mechanical advantage. Like in Neanderthals, the tibial shaft is ellipsoid as opposed to the triangular shaft of modern humans, Boxgrove Man, and Kabwe 1. The fibula indicates that the gastrocnemius and soleus muscles were shorter than in modern humans, indicating a higher energy cost when moving.

Like other archaic humans, the talus bone is tall, broad, and rectangular (as opposed to the wedge-shaped one of modern humans); the head is narrower than in Neanderthals and modern humans. The shape of the bone may have improved up-and-down motion in the ankle. Still, like in Neanderthals, the smaller malleolar fossa (which connects to the malleolus) on the fibula indicates a narrower range of dorsiflexion than in modern humans but better stabilizes the ankle. The heel bone is long, like Neanderthals, which may have improved shock absorption to compensate for the larger build. The Sima de los Huesos hominins were probably bigger than Neanderthals, and the sustentaculum talus (which supports the spring ligament) projects farther out than in Neanderthals. As in Neanderthals, the phalanges and third to fifth metatarsals have a broad base and the big toe is wider. The metatarsals and phalanges are generally broader and more robust than in Neanderthals, which may be related to their larger size. They probably walked and ran with the forefoot striking the ground first.

== Pathology ==
=== Diseases ===
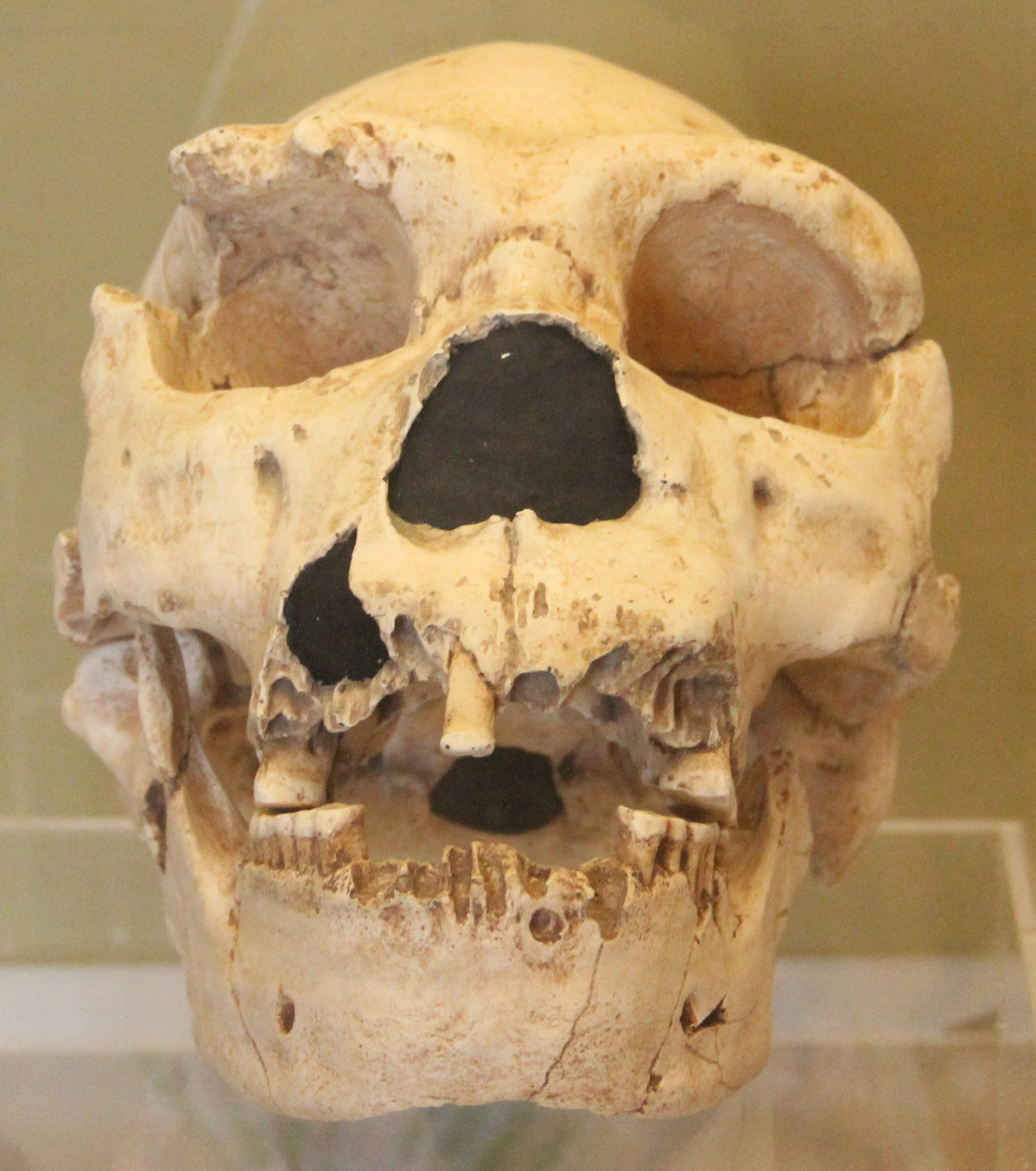
Cranium 5 (Miguelón) had severe tooth decay.

Cranium 5 has severe dental decay, moderate gum disease, and alveolar osteitis on the left side. All of its teeth have excessive wearing. There is extensive alveolar bone loss which caused overeruption of the teeth; at least one-third of the root of every tooth is exposed. This individual seems to have been treating his gum disease with a toothpick, and similar toothpick grooves are found in isolated teeth in the Sima de los Huesos. The lower left third molar (M_{3}) is chipped. The upper left first premolar (P^{3}) was badly chipped in life, exposing the pulp cavity. The wound appears to have become chronically infected, leading to periapical cyst and fistula formation with remodeling of the surrounding bone. The lower left incisors also formed cysts, with pulp cavity exposure probably stemming from excessive loading and wearing in life; the upper incisors are similarly ground down. The infection seems to have progressed to orbital cellulitis in the eye, and may have progressed to terminal sepsis.

About 40 percent of the teeth have enamel hypoplasia, resulting from bouts of nutritional stress peaking at about 3½ years of age. This could indicate the weaning age, which was probably around four years of age in Neanderthals (like recent hunter-gatherers). Neanderthals had higher rates and more intense bouts of hypoplasia because their subsistence strategies were less efficient, or because they lived in harsher environments.

Based on joint degeneration, "Elvis" may have lived for over 45 years. He had lumbar kyphosis (excessive curving of the lumbar vertebrae in the lower back), L5–S1 spondylolisthesis (misalignment of the last lumbar vertebra with the first sacral vertebra), and Baastrup disease (enlargement of the spinous processes) in L4 and 5. These would have caused lower back pain (significantly limiting movement), and may indicate group care.

The adolescent Cranium 14 was diagnosed with lambdoid single-suture craniosynostosis (immature closing of the left lambdoid suture, leading to skull deformities as development continued). This is a rare condition in modern humans, occurring in fewer than six of every 200,000 individuals. The individual died at around age 10, suggesting that it was not abandoned due to deformity (as has been done historically), and received the same quality of care as other children.

=== Hibernation ===
In 2020, Greek paleopathologist Antonis Bartsiokas and Arsuaga argued that the Sima de los Huesos hominins underwent hibernation during the harsh winter months. (Note: There are vague historical references to hibernation in humans, such as a six-month uninterrupted sleep (lotska) by Russian peasants in Pskov during the winter, or Herodotus' report of people north of Scythia (i.e. Russia) sleeping for half the year.) They argued that the adolescents in particular have pathologies consistent with chronic metabolic and malnutritional diseases, which could be consistent with insufficient fat reserves during hibernation. The adults do not seem to have suffered to the same degree. In hibernating mammals, hibernation seems to be commonly induced by hypoxia (low blood-oxygen levels) which—for unclear reasons—reduces core body temperature. Hypoxia can impede:

- Shivering in cold temperatures;
- Norepinephrine production (which correlates with waking and alertness) and consequently the sympathetic nervous system (which maintains homeostasis);
- Blood flow to brown adipose tissue (which stimulates the tissue's heat-generating mechanism).

That is, hypoxia can suppress the fight-or-flight response and permit the body temperature to drop without triggering arousal.

The Sima de los Huesos fossils have several signs of chronic kidney disease–mineral and bone disorder (CKD–MBD), indicated by frequent osteitis fibrosa and renal osteodystrophy (ROD). They also have signs of vitamin D deficiency (which proceeds from CKD), with resultant hypocalcemia and secondary hyperparathyroidism (2HPT). These diseases appear altogether in hibernating animals with insufficient fat stores. Fat deficiency halts lipolysis, preventing the release of vitamin D stored in fat cells. It also boosts cortisol levels to aid fat catabolism at the expense of serum calcium levels, and hypercortisolism ultimately progresses to kidney disease. Fat deficiency is a major source of hibernation mortality.

The relevant pathologies are:

- Regular bouts of extreme, cyclical vitamin D deficiency caused lines of arrested growth in bone consistent with rickets (rachitic osteoplaques). The pubescent Cranium 9 has four such osteoplaques of rachitic hyperostosis: four short adolescent growth spurts separated by arrested growth (dormancy), a pattern characteristic of arousal from torpor. In other words, this individual may have emerged from hibernation four times in a (presumably) four-month hibernation period.
- "Elvis" has several brown tumors (a type of osteitis fibrosa), part of the recovery process from severe CKD–MBD, rickets, and 2HPT.
- Some fossils have calcified soft tissue consistent with calcium pyrophosphate dihydrate crystal deposition disease. In bats, this is caused by increased production of adenosine triphosphate (ATP) during lipolysis of brown adipose tissue to produce heat during periods of arousal from hibernation.
- The population seems to have had subperiosteal new bone growth and consequent bone resorption in many places (especially the phalanges and the lamina dura in the teeth), resulting from severe rickets, 2HPT, and osteomalacia as a consequence of ROD during healing.
- Some ribs have the rachitic rosary (bead-like growths near the sternum) stemming from renal rickets and 2HPT.

Like the cave bears at the site, the Sima de los Huesos hominins may have developed hibernation to cope with the frigid, lean winters; one adolescent cave-bear specimen has subperiosteal new bone growth resulting from rickets. The age of the Sima de los Huesos hominins is skewed towards adolescents, which is also observed in hibernation-related mortality. Hibernation does not seem to have been practiced by Neanderthals, possibly because they were metabolically better at withstanding the cold and were efficient hunters capable of sustaining themselves year-round.

=== Violence ===
Crania 3, 5, 7, 9, 11, 13, 14, and 17 have several perimortem (around the time of death) fractures. These fractures may have occurred while falling down the shaft — not necessarily while they were alive, but near the time of death. Four percent of the long-bone material has perimortem fracturing, without major injuries. American archeologist Erik Trinkaus noticed a similar pattern in Neanderthals, and suggested that individuals who could not walk (or keep up with a group) while moving between cave sites were left behind. If true, only individuals without major trauma to the lower limbs would be found at cave sites (survivor bias). It is unclear if this applies to Sima de los Huesos. The only pathological foot specimen is a fourth metatarsal (AT-534) with a periosteal reaction to a presumed march fracture, a minor injury common in barefoot runners.

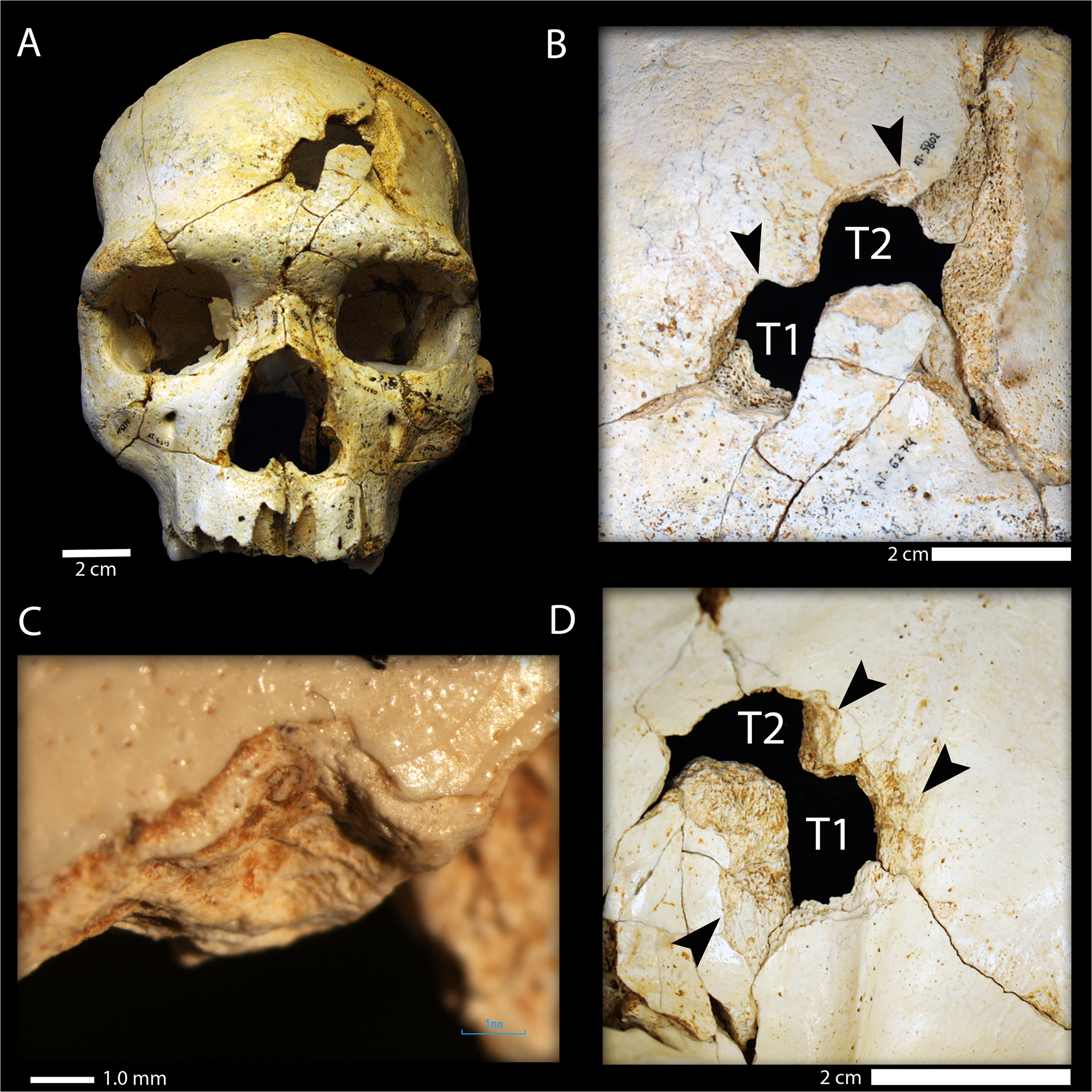
Cranium 17, with two identical forehead fractures

Cranium 17 has two nearly identical, connected, rectangular perimortem depression fractures on the left frontal squama (T1 below and T2 above). They are consistent with powerful blunt-force trauma, passing through the bone into the brain. The injuries are at an acute angle and have different trajectories: 32.5°–44.8° and 49.2°, respectively. This suggests that they were caused by two separate actions. The identical shape (with the same notch in the same position) suggests that they were caused by the same object, making it is improbable that the individual incurred these fractures from falling into the Sima de los Huesos or being struck by randomly-falling limestone blocks. The fractures may be the result of an intentional attack by another human with a tool in their right hand, resulting in death.

These indicate that the individual represented by the Cranium 17 was dead before they were dropped into the Sima de los Huesos, and (without carnivore damage) was probably interred by other humans. Congruently, dental wearing patterns suggest that the Sima de los Huesos hominins were predominantly right-handed, and in forensic medicine multiple blows to the face above the hat brim are normally interpreted as an assault (the hat-brim rule). Perimortem fracturing on the Cranium 5 frontal and left parietal and the Cranium 11 left parietal may have also resulted from interpersonal violence. No defensive injuries on the arms have been discovered.

Interpersonal violence is difficult to identify in the fossil record. By 2015, the only other specimens with strong evidence of this in the human fossil record were the Neanderthal Shanidar 3 and the modern human Sunghir 1.

== Culture ==
=== Paleoenvironment ===
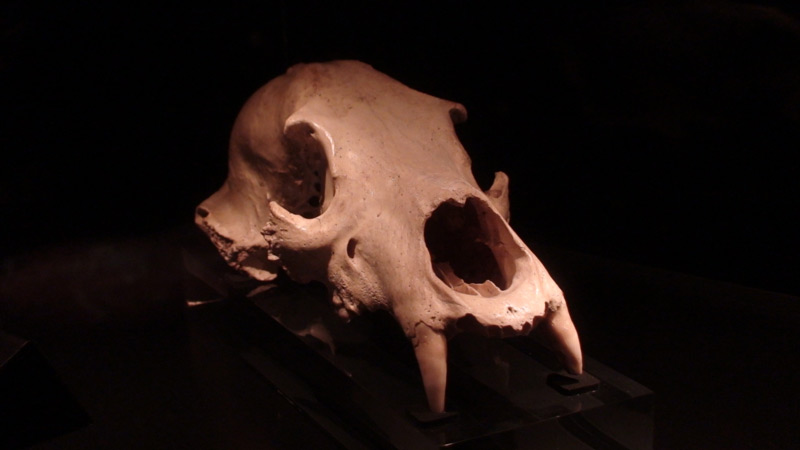
Ursus deningeri skull from the Sima de los Huesos

The Sima de los Huesos hominins were associated with an unusually-diverse carnivore assemblage: the cave bear U. deningeri (this population seems to have been mostly herbivorous), wolf (possibly Canis mosbachensis), red fox, cave lion Panthera fossilis, European jaguar, cave lynx, pine marten, least weasel, European polecat, and European badger. This may indicate a highly-productive ecosystem. Rodents and other small mammals are far less common and large herbivores are absent, consistent with the characterization of the site as a natural pitfall trap. The cave hyena (a common occurrence in contemporaneous sites across Europe) is absent, and the Sima de los Huesos hominins may have been outcompeting them in the region. At TD10.1, there is evidence of cave-lion hunting and butchery; exploitation of carnivores is rare in the Middle Pleistocene, and this may have been a sporadic occurrence. U. deningeri is the most common animal at the site, but is not found anywhere else in the Sierra de Atapuerca. They may have been especially susceptible to falling into the Sima de los Huesos since they needed to seek out caves to hibernate in. Three human ribs are peeled, and may have been fed on by a bear that fell in.

Several well-preserved bat fossils (mostly the greater mouse-eared bat and a few Mehely's horseshoe bats) and significant guano accumulation were also found, probably representing overwintering roosts. Early Pleistocene deposits seem to indicate that bats roosted in the area year-round, but seasonally in the Middle Pleistocene when human activity increased. Although the deteriorating climate may have altered roosting behavior, their inability to recover during warmer periods (as other small mammals did) may indicate that they were disturbed by human activity. The rodent fossils are well-preserved, with no signs of digestion (not deposited by owl pellets), so they probably tunneled in through a small crevice.

The Gran Dolina TD10.1 and Galería GII and GIII sites had fallow deer Dama clactoniana, red deer, roe deer Capreolus priscus, giant deer Praemegaceros solilhacus, narrow-nosed rhinoceros, wild horses, European wild asses, wood bison (Bison schoetensacki), and Bonal tahr. These herbivores could have been prey. Like Neanderthals, the Sima de los Huesos hominins may have had a hyper-carnivorous diet comparable to contemporary lions. Galería seems to have also been a natural trap, and humans may have been making sporadic, planned trips to the site as a complementary settlement area to harvest animals which fell in. TD10.1 was most likely occupied long-term, and the inhabitants seem to have been transporting the most nutritious parts of a prey item back to the cave.

The Sima de los Huesos hominins probably lived during one of the coldest glacial phases of the last million years which aridified Iberia. Present winter temperatures in the Atapuerca Mountains can drop to −10 °C (14 °F), and it could have been colder during glacial periods. The mammal assemblage indicates a savannah-like, open woodland environment. Humans and lions seem to have followed Europe's expanding open-woodland corridors, and the pollen record indicates the spread of grass at this time. Pine was predominant in addition to grasses, followed by mesic plants such as oak, birch, and beech. Extensive vertical scratches on teeth indicate that the Sima de los Huesos hominins commonly chewed abrasive (dirty) foods such as unwashed roots and stems. Females tended to have longer scratches in the lower teeth, suggesting that their diet may differed from males.

=== Stone tools ===
No stone tools were found in the Sima de los Huesos and it was probably never inhabited. The Galería and Gran Dolina sites, on the other hand, have expansive stone assemblages. Knapping techniques evolved over time, but the Galería assemblage generally fits into the Acheulean industry (a Lower Paleolithic technology). TD10.1 could represent a transition to the Mousterian industry, a Middle Paleolithic technology associated with Neanderthals.

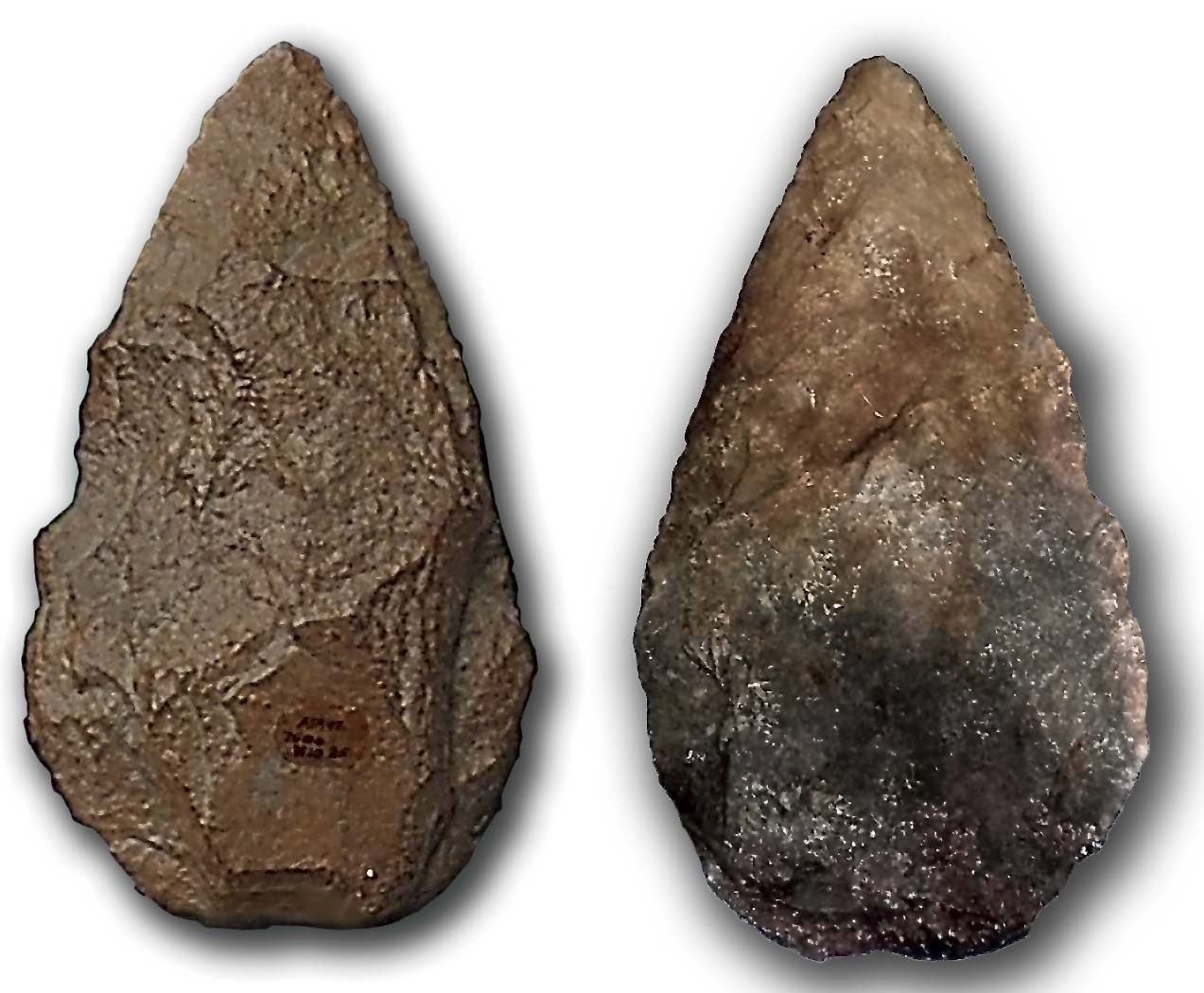
An Acheulean handaxe from Trinchera Galería

There is little debitage (waste) in Galería, suggesting that the tools were primarily made offsite, with only quick, simple retouching onsite. This suggests that the site was a temporary base camp. In GIIa (the older part), the tool assemblage is primarily simple lithic flakes followed by retouched tools and unmodified cobble. Retouched tools were usually made of chert and quartz, and large cutting tools (handaxes and cleavers) were primarily made from quartzite. Unusually, cobble seems to have been used to shape the larger tools. Larger tools (which require more planning) were produced more frequently from pre-prepared flakes instead of cobble in GIIb, and quartzite is often replaced by sandstone, chert, and limestone. It is possible that GIIb is a new group (not descended from the knappers responsible for the GIIa cache), with different tool-making traditions. These trends continue into GIII, but the knappers stopped shaping the base of the tool. Fewer and more efficient strikes were used in GIII, cleaving bigger flakes from a core but making the end product less standardized. The tools are also generally shorter and wider.

TD10.1 preserves over 20,000 stone tools, one of the archeologically-richest sites in the Atapuerca Mountains. This probably represents long- and short-term occupation. Flakes and debitage predominate over large cutting tools and a complete chaîne opératoire (all debitage and products made during the tool-making process are present). TD10.1 is otherwise comparable to GIII. Tools were primarily made of chert, but sandstone and quartzite became more popular. Some chert seems to have been collected from a source 10 km (6.2 mi) away, an unexpectedly-long distance to obtain resources for an early group of humans. These tools were probably used extensively for butchering, hide- and woodworking. Dental wearing suggests that every individual commonly used their mouth as a third hand to bite (probable) animal skin or vegetable fibers with their front teeth, while cutting the material with a tool.

Knapping techniques are generally nonstandardized, but the gradual shift in raw materials caused the longitudinal method (striking a lithic core parallel to its long axis, better suited for harder quartzite) to become less common than the orthogonal method (striking a core perpendicular to its long axis). In Galería, this was gradually replaced by the centripetal method (striking starts at the edge of the core and works inward) in combination with the longitudinal method. In TD10.1, the centripetal and discoidal methods (associated with the Middle Paleolithic Levallois technique, exercising more control over the final shape) became more popular.

=== Fire ===
The Sima de los Huesos hominins were probably not using fire, withstanding the cold climate with their large body size and (presumed) high activity levels and metabolic heat. Quality evidence of fire use in Europe appears after an interglacial during Marine Isotope Stage 9 (about 340,000 years ago). A 400,000-year-old site in Barnham, Suffolk, has evidence of burned tools and iron pyrite which in recent history has been used as a fire striker. This suggests that at least some European populations at this time had the ability to create fire, but fire creation in non-modern humans is still debated.

=== Burial ===
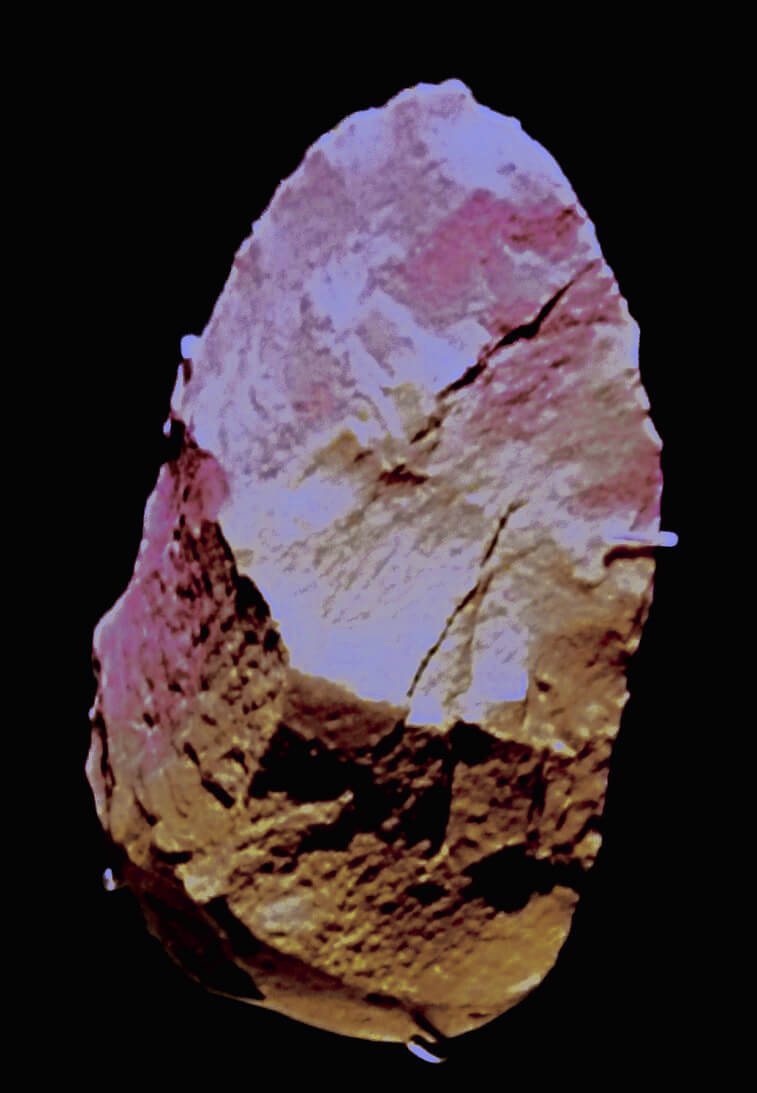
"Excalibur" may have been a grave good.

Peculiarities in the taphonomy of the Sima de los Huesos hominins suggest that they were intentionally buried by other humans instead of, like the many cave bears at the site, falling down a natural pitfall. About half of the Sima de los Huesos material is from adolescents between 15 and 18 years of age. Infants (below 2 years) are absent; children under age 10 are unusually rare given the high infant mortality of recent hunter-gatherer societies (assuming such a high rate was normal). Based on tooth wear, the few individuals who seem to have lived past age 30 may not have survived into their 40s. The over-representation of young adults (a catastrophic mortality profile) instead of children and the elderly (an attritional mortality profile) suggests that the accumulation does not represent multiple generations who lived and died in the cave, but rather a single high-mortality event. A lack of stone tools also suggests that this was not a living space. Because the entire skeleton (including fragile pieces) is well-represented and the deposit comprises so many individuals found in the same narrow layer of sediment, the bodies were probably deposited intact in the Sima de los Huesos at around the same time. For the most part, they lack carnivore damage. Because Cranium 17 has two identical fatal injuries (presumably caused by the same hard object), the individual was probably already dead—possibly at the hands of another human—before being deposited into the Sima de los Huesos.

An Acheulean handaxe (nicknamed "Excalibur") was deposited with the bodies, the only stone artifact found at the site. It is made of high-quality veined quartzite (rarely used in the region), and was large: 155 mm × 97 mm × 58 mm (6.1 in × 3.8 in × 2.3 in) and 685 g (1.5 lb). The axe lacks any indication of wearing or use, unless it was scrubbed away by sand over time. In the context of intentional burial, Carbonell and colleagues suggested that it was left as a grave good — an early example of complex symbolic thinking.

=== Language ===
The Sima de los Huesos hominins may have used an early form of language given the evidence of intentional burial and symbolic thinking. They had a modern-human-like hyoid bone (which supports the tongue), but this trait can exist without language and human speech capacity. Judging by dental striation, they seem to have been primarily right-handed; handedness is related to the lateralization of brain function typically associated with language processing in modern humans.

The middle-ear bones are comparable to Neanderthals and modern humans, suggesting that they could distinguish the higher frequencies necessary to discern speech (2–4 kHz). However, their ear anatomy suggests that the Sima de los Huesos hominins had different hearing capacities than Neanderthals and modern humans. Like chimpanzees, the ear canal is long; the eardrum and oval window are small and at a low angle. Uniquely, the tympanic cavity (which contains the middle-ear bones) and aditus are large. The cochlea (which affects hearing) is more constricted than Neanderthals in the first turn (of about three turns), reminiscent of chimpanzees. Like Neanderthals and modern humans, the third turn is short but more strongly curved.

== See also ==
- Altamura Man
- Ceprano Man
- Jebel Irhoud
