= Agamenón (hominin) =

Hominin fossil

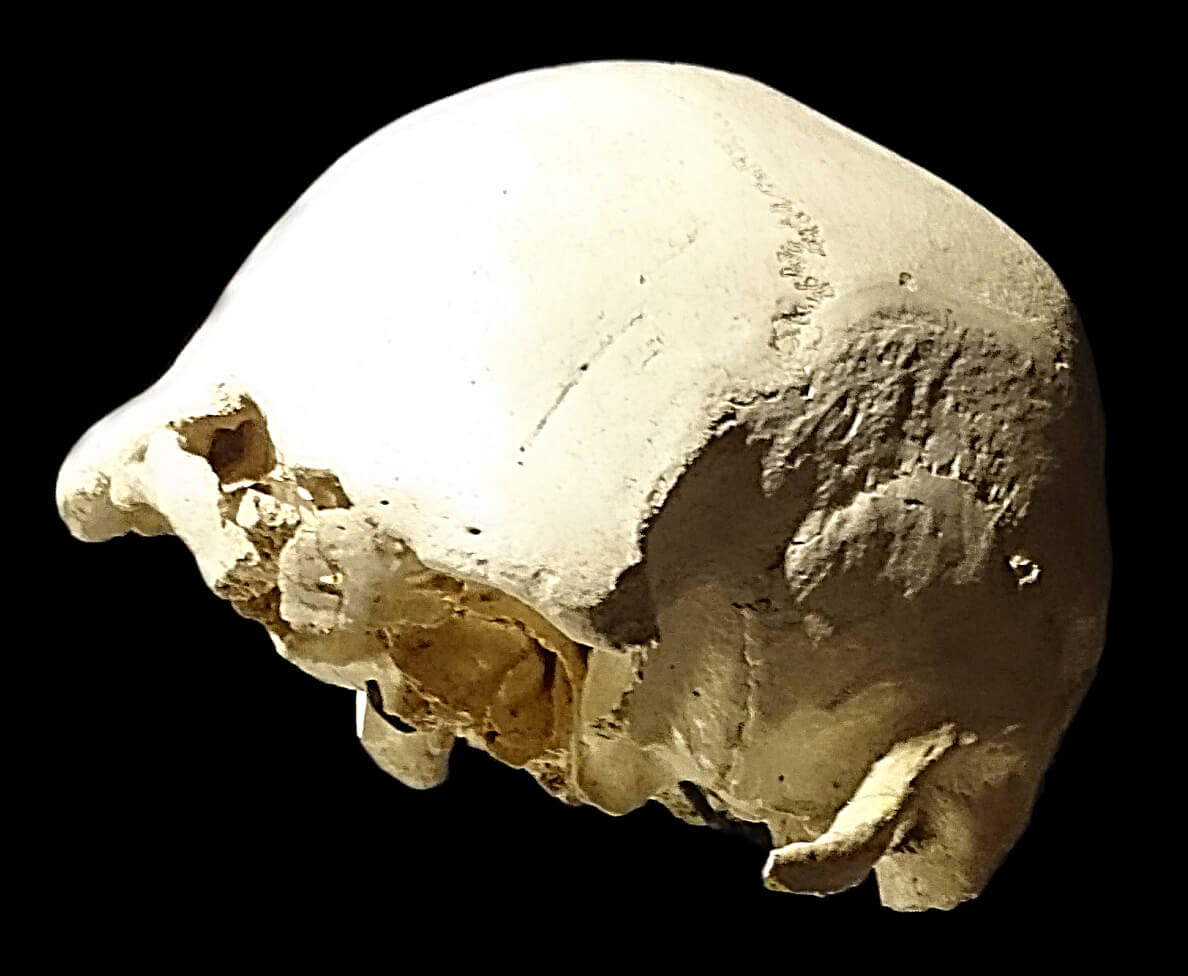
- Catalog no.: SH 4
- Common name: Agamenón
- Species: Homo neanderthalensis
- Age: 430 ka
- Place discovered: Atapuerca, Spain
- Date discovered: 1992
- Discovered by: Paleontological teams

Agamenón, also known as Agamemnon, is a fossil calvarium belonging to an early Neanderthal that lived at the site of Atapuerca around 430,000 years ago. The crania recovered from Sima de los Huesos have multiple specimen catalogues including Sima de los Huesos 4, SH 4, Cranium 4, Cr4, and Skull 4. Original analyses of the specimen concluded that the individual was deaf, although further study has proven that this is not the case. It is now held at the Museum of Human Evolution.

== History ==
The specimen was discovered by paleontologists in 1992 and was catalogued as Skull 4. In 1997, the hearing capacity of the individual was evaluated and determined to be deaf based on a singular tomographic image, contrary to more recent advances. It was discovered alongside Miguelón, SH 5.

== Description ==
Agamenón is one of the most complete skulls for its chronological age of 430,000 years. In life, the Sima de los Huesos hominins had a hearing capacity that was very similar from Homo sapiens, but not identical. They were able to hear the majority of sounds that comprise human language with precision. In this individual, the canals of the ear were quite inhibited by a case of exostosis. However, contrary to previous belief, the individual was fully capable of hearing. Similar cases of exostosis are seen in recent skeletons, but also in European and Middle Eastern Neanderthals as well. The inner orbital edge differences (38 mm) are alike to Bilzingsleben. This skull and Miguelón differ in their vault shape, which is likely caused by allometry. The cranial capacity is 1390 squared centimeters, which is very large for Middle Pleistocene Homo of such antiquity.

=== Pathology ===
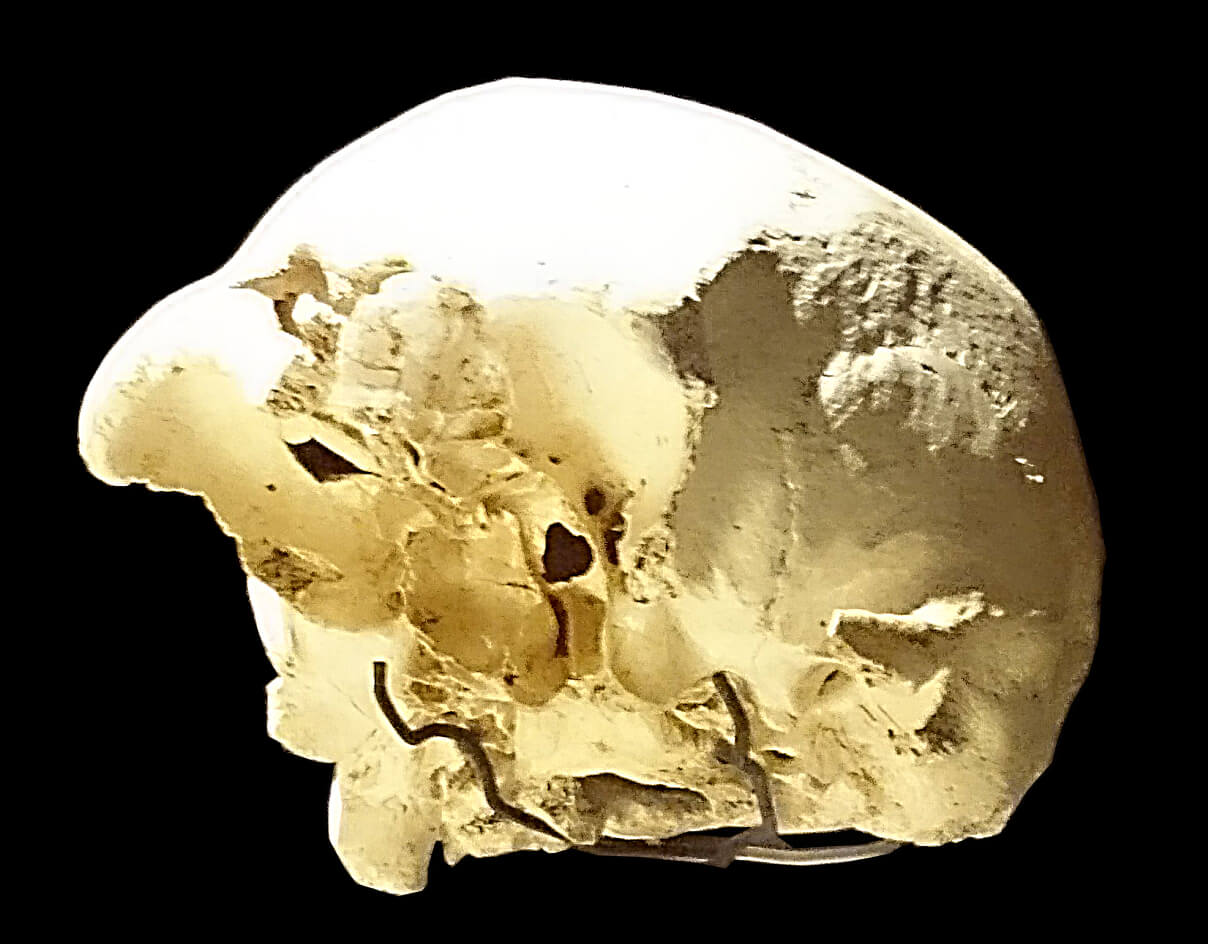
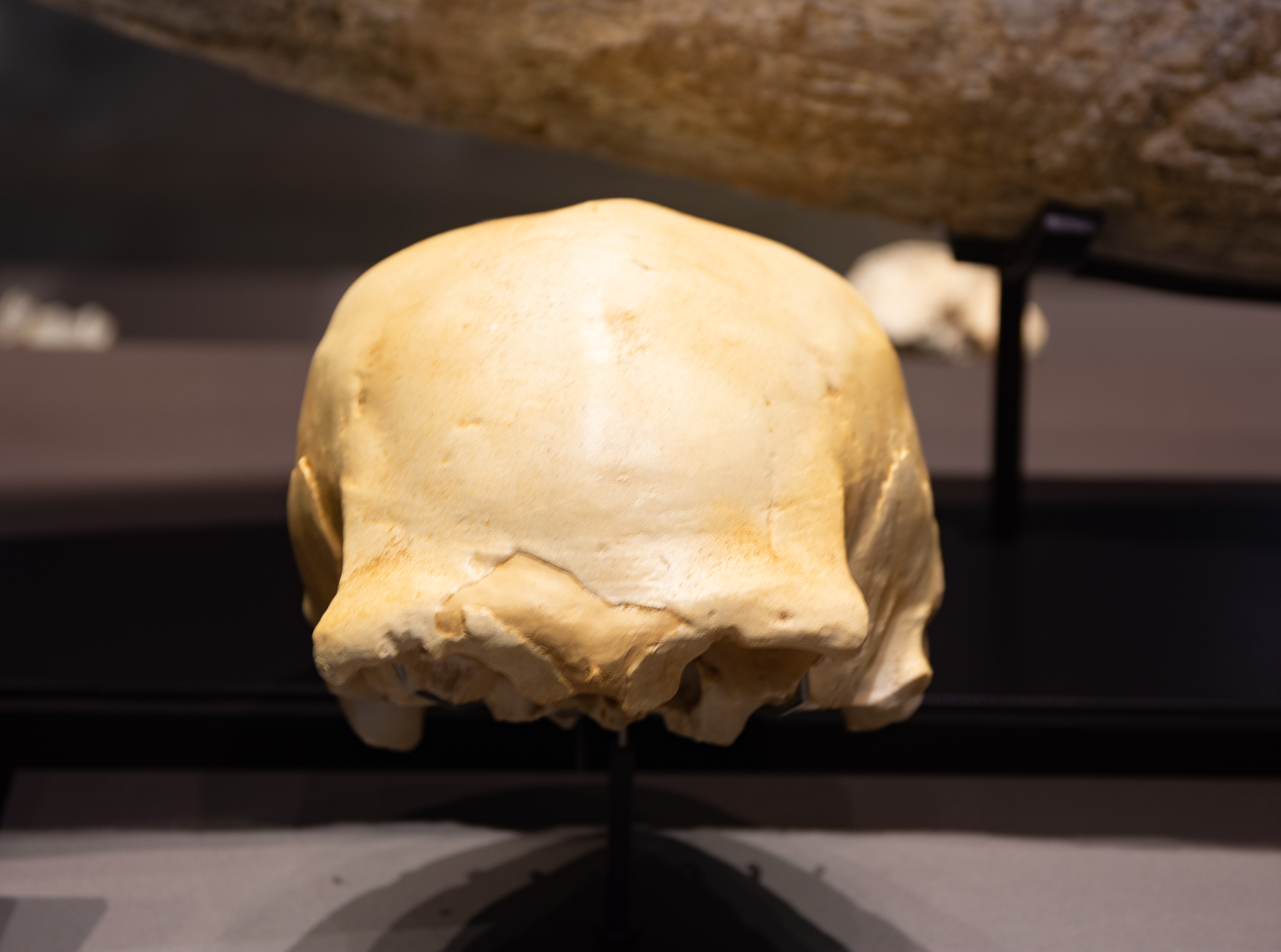

SH 4 was originally suggested to have been deaf in life due to the strange shape of the cochlear bones. Previous research found that the irregularities blocked the canal, and as such classified the pathology as exostosis ('surfer's ear'). People who suffer from this condition may have episodic otitis externa, characterized by sensationalized plugging, pain, and purulent discharge from the ear. Exostosis is common in people who regularly contact with cold water, strong winds, and bacteria, or due to genetic heritability.

Renewed study in 2019 suggests that the conclusions reached in 1997 are untrue, that the auditory canals were not sealed shut. Despite irregularity, three dimensional models of the bone indicates that the individual was able to hear. The 2019 study agrees, however, that the individual had exostosis, but not to a degree that caused deafness, as none of the other crania have the cochlear irregularities. They suggested that because of this, it was not caused by environmental factors that the entire population would have experienced, and infection may be a possible cause.
