= Miguelón =

Hominin fossil

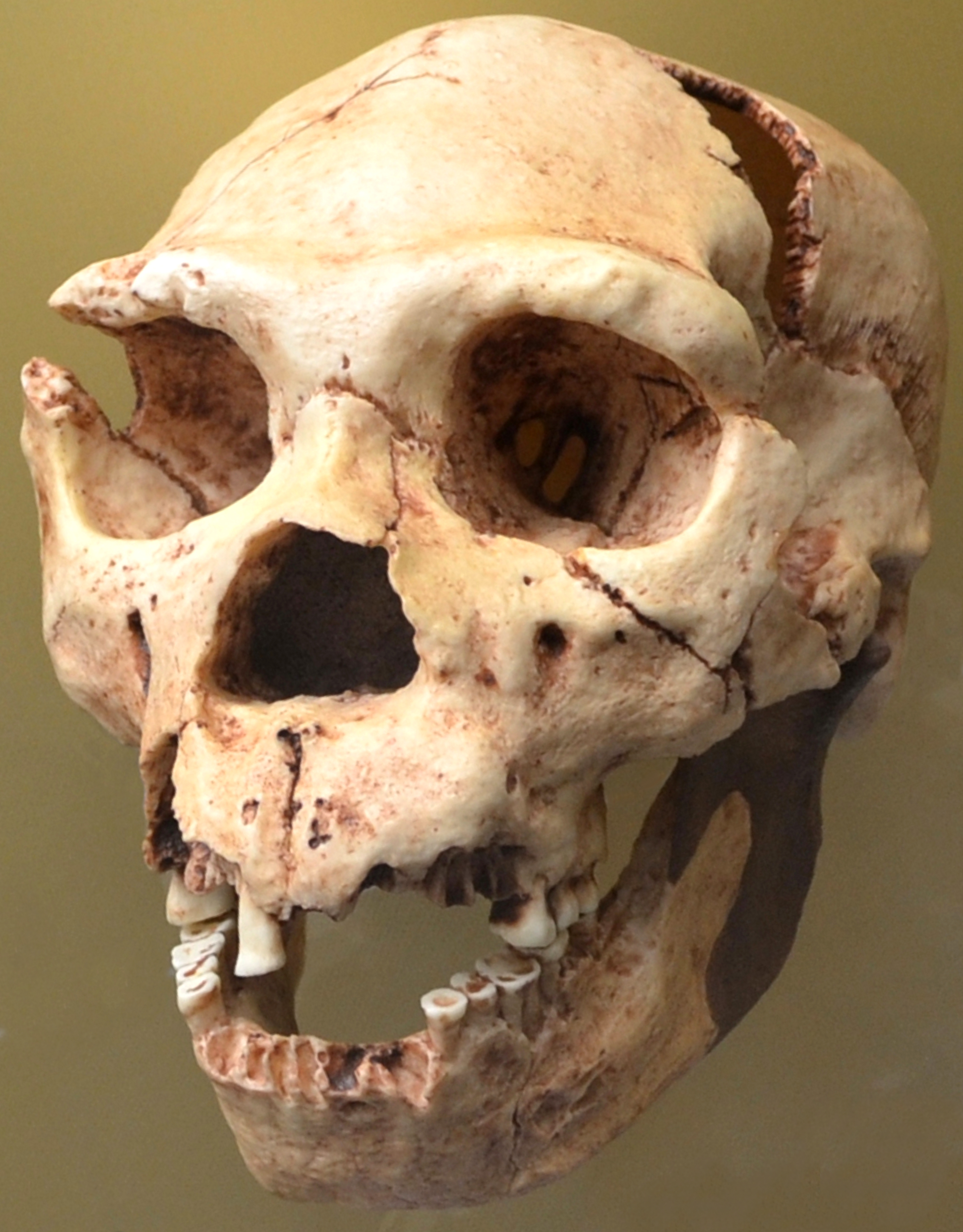
- Cranium 5. The mandible of this cranium was nearly intact.
- Catalog no.: Skull 5
- Common name: Miguelón
- Species: "Neanderthal clade"
- Age: ~430,000 bp
- Place discovered: Atapuerca, Spain
- Date discovered: 1992
- Discovered by: Bermúdez, Arsuaga & Carbonell

Miguelón is the popular nickname for a human skull of the Sima de los Huesos hominins, classified as belonging to the "Neanderthal clade". One of the best preserved skulls in the human fossil record, it has been estimated to date to 430,000 years ago. It is one of more than 5,500 fossils belonging to early human populations which have been found in the Sima de los Huesos ("pit of bones") site in the Sierra de Atapuerca in northern Spain.

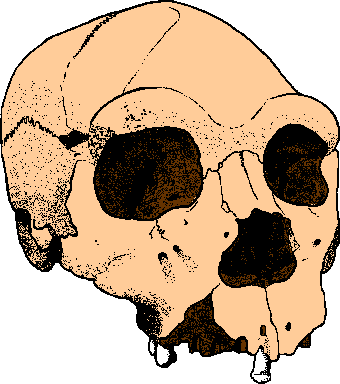
Another view of the cranium 5 of Atapuerca.

The excavators suggest that this concentration of bones in the pit may represent the practice of burial by the inhabitants of the cave. A competing theory cites the lack of small bones in the assemblage and suggests that the remains were washed into the pit by natural agents.

Evidence in the form of genetic analysis suggests that the Sima de los Huesos hominins were ancestral to later Neanderthals. Subsequently, there is debate about whether to include them within Homo heidelbergensis or whether they represent early members of Homo neanderthalensis.

Miguelón, around thirty years old, had suffered 13 impacts in the head and died of sepsis resulting from broken teeth. The frontal squama has a spherical depression on the left side indicative of a blow to the head by a club or rounded flint implement wielded by a right-handed individual. In his upper left jaw there is an important bone alteration, with evidence of alveolar infection. According to Arsuaga, a tooth had been broken in life by a strong blow, so that the flesh had been exposed and led to an infectious process that continued until nearly the orbital bone. The cranial capacity is around 1100cc.

The nickname Miguelón was derived from Miguel Indurain, a retired Spanish road racing cyclist who won the Tour and Giro in 1992, the year in which this skull was discovered.

== See also ==
- List of human fossils
- List of hominina (hominid) fossils (with images)
