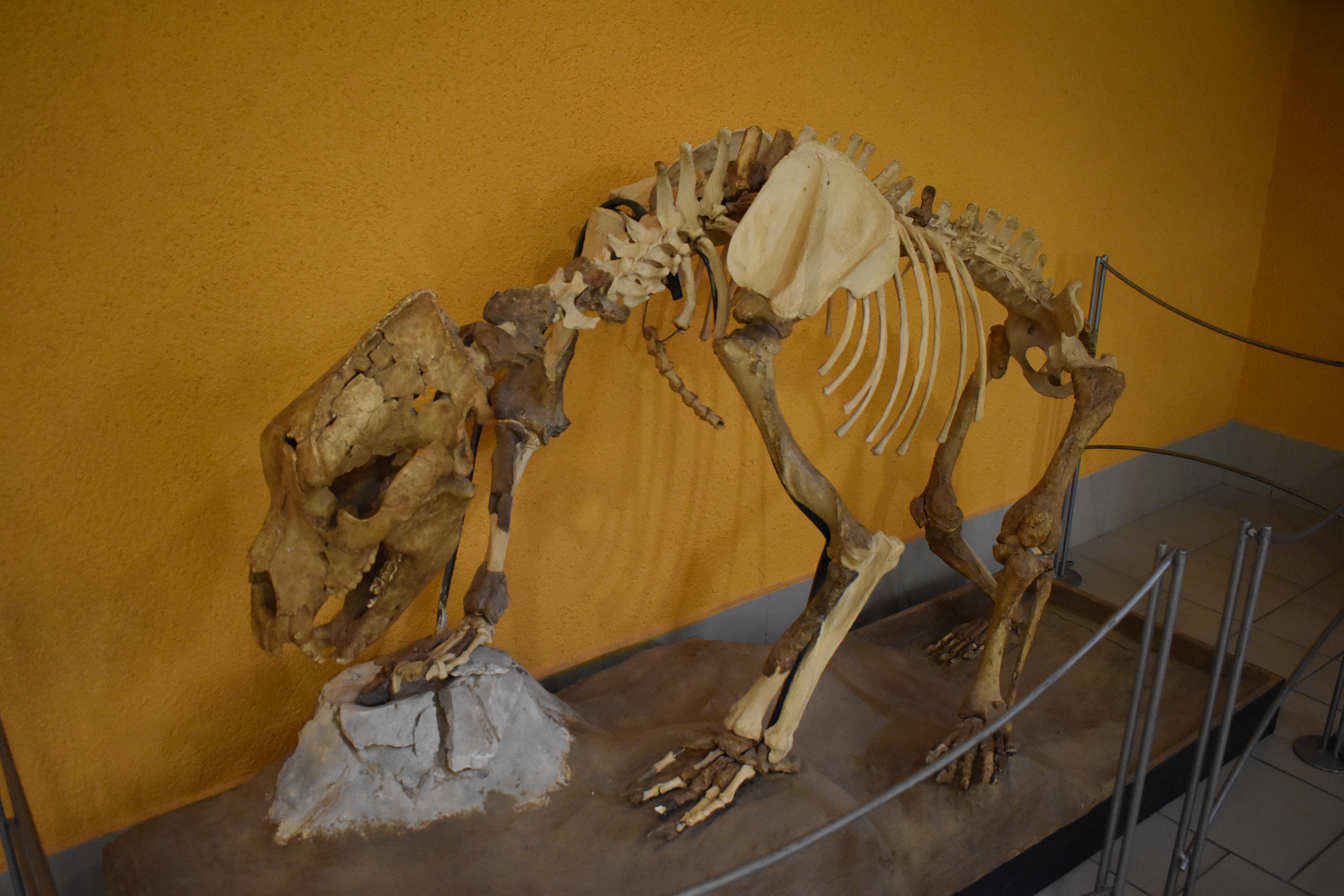
- Skeleton of Ursus deningeri at Musée de Préhistoire de Tautavel

Scientific classification
- Kingdom: Animalia
- Phylum: Chordata
- Class: Mammalia
- Order: Carnivora
- Family: Ursidae
- Genus: Ursus
- Species: †U. deningeri

Binomial name
- †Ursus deningeri von Reichenau, 1904

Subspecies
- Ursus deningeri hundsheimensis Zapfe, 1946; Ursus deningeri suevicus Zapfe, 1946; Ursus deningeri romeviensis Zapfe, 1946

= Ursus deningeri =

Ursus deningeri Temporal range: Early Pleistocene–Middle Pleistocene

Extinct species of carnivore

Ursus deningeri (sometimes called Deninger's bear) is an extinct species of bear native to Eurasia from the late Early Pleistocene to the Middle Pleistocene. It is the earliest member of the cave bear lineage and is widely agreed to be the ancestor of later cave bears.

== Evolution ==
Ursus deningeri is widely thought to have evolved from Ursus etruscus (which is also thought to be the ancestor of the brown bear Ursus arctos), perhaps via the intermediate species Ursus dolinensis, though this is debated. The genetic divergence between the ancestors of cave bears and the lineage which gave rise to brown bears and polar bears was estimated in a 2021 study which sequenced the genome of a 360,000 year old cave bear to be around 1.5 million years ago. The earliest fossils of U. deningeri date to the late Early Pleistocene, around 1.2-0.8 million years ago, though the fossil record of the species is most extensive during the following Middle Pleistocene. By the Late Pleistocene, U. deningeri had split into several genetically divergent lineages of cave bears.

== Description ==
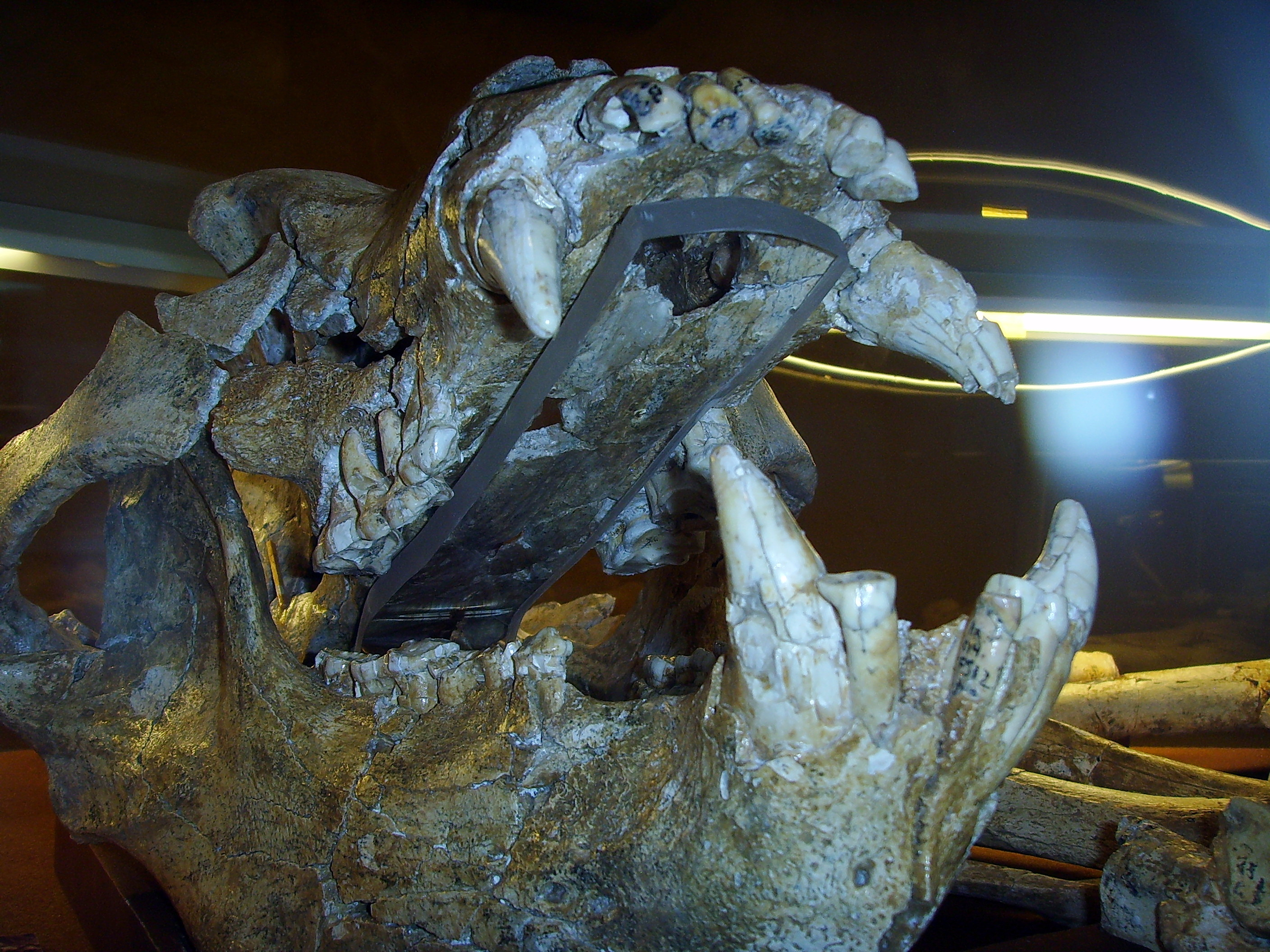
Skull of Ursus deningeri from Arago Cave, France

Ursus deningeri differs from Late Pleistocene cave bears in several aspects, including its generally smaller size, its less stout canine teeth and metapodial bones of the foot. In comparison to later cave bears, it has a greater number of postcanine teeth (though the number of premolar teeth varies between U. deningeri individuals), though the occlusal surfaces of the teeth are smaller. The palate of the skull is more curved than those of later cave bears, and while like later cave bears it has a pronouncedly domed skull, this is less pronounced than in later forms. The species was sexually dimorphic with males being twice the size of females.

== Ecology ==
Dental wear analysis suggests that U. deningeri had a diet heavy in abrasive herbivorous food, such as tubers, nuts and consumed grit surrounding such food items, consistent with its skeletal morphology which suggests an aptitude for digging and prising. However, isotopic analysis suggests that it was not entirely herbivorous and likely engaged in some carnivorous behaviour.

== Distribution ==
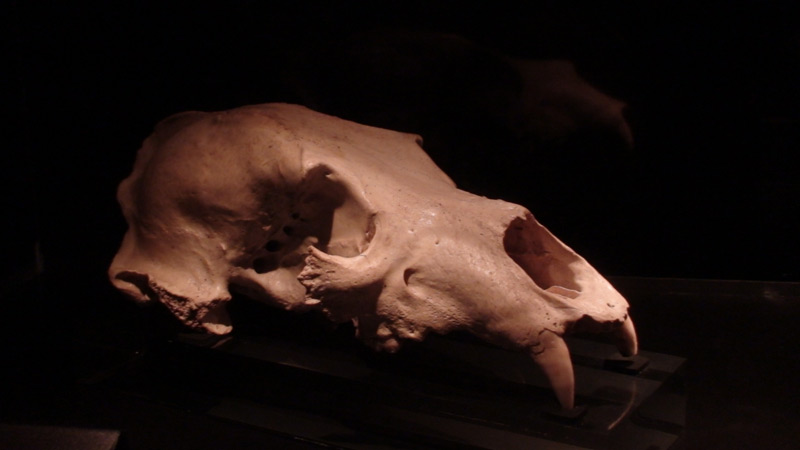
Skull from Atapuerca, Spain

Ursus deningeri is known from fossils spanning across northern Eurasia, primarily from Europe, spanning from the Iberian Peninsula (including Sima de los Huesos in Spain) and Britain (including the Cromer Forest Bed and Kents Cavern) in the west, northwards to Germany, southwards to Italy, Greece (including Petralona Cave), the Caucasus Turkey (including Yarımburgaz Cave), and Israel, and eastwards to Central Asia (including Kyrgyzstan), Buryatia in the southern Russian Far East, northern China (Zhoukoudian cave), and possibly Mongolia, though remains of the species in East Asia are very rare in comparison to Europe. Probable, though not definitively confirmed, remains of U. deningeri are known from the Somssich Hill 2 site of Hungary.

== Relationship with humans ==
Remains at several sites suggest that the remains of U. deningeri were utilized by archaic humans. At the Boxgrove site in England, dating to approximately 480,000 years ago, a fragment of U. deningeri skull (the zygomatic bar) bears a cut mark suggesting that it had been defleshed/skinned, perhaps to utilize its pelt.^{396-403} At the Medzhibozh locality in Ukraine, dating to around 400,000 years ago, a U. deningeri tibia shows fracturing and cut marks consistent with butchery.
