= Juan Luis Arsuaga =

Spanish paleoanthropologist and author

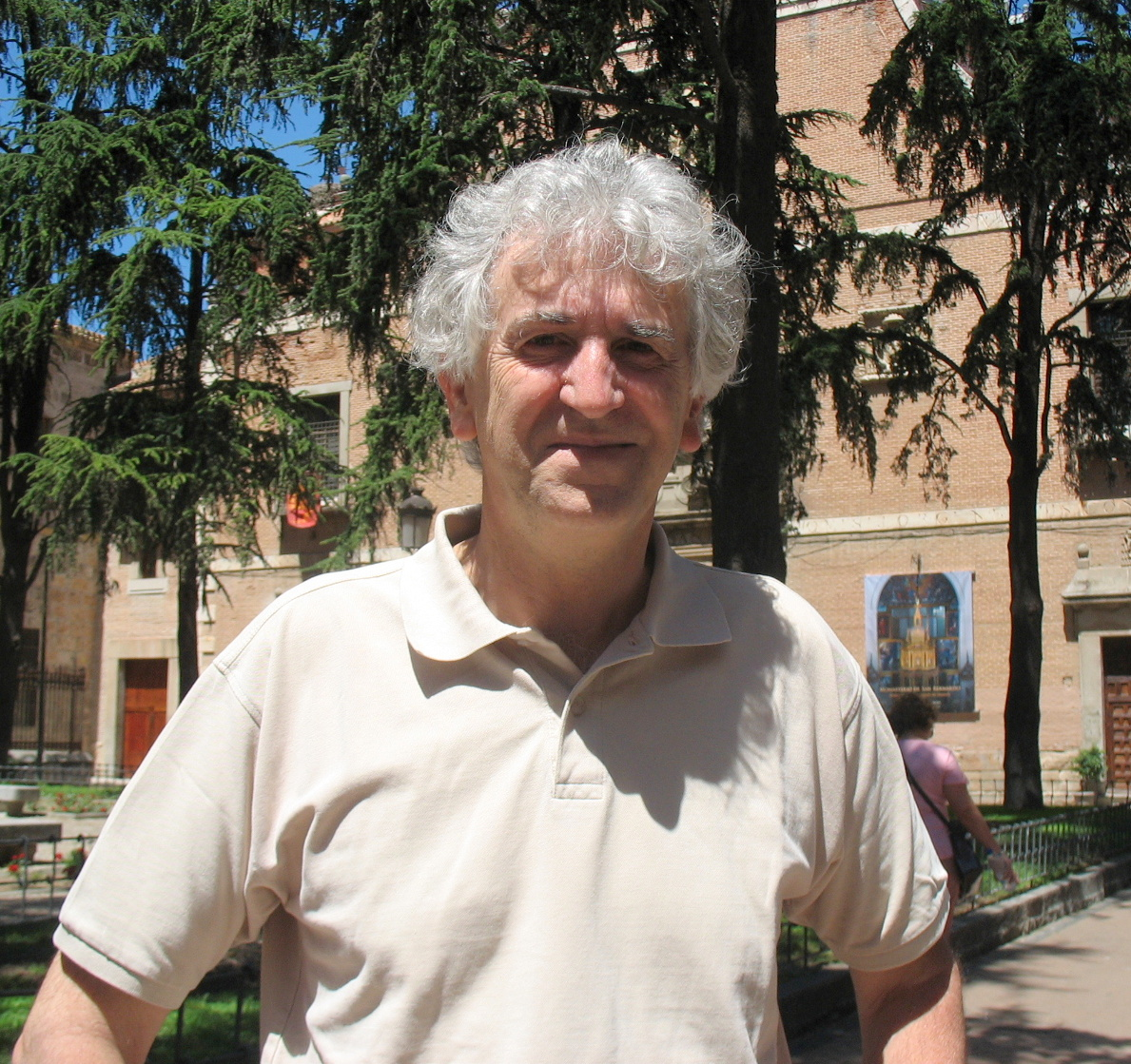
Juan Luis Arsuaga

Juan Luis Arsuaga Ferreras (born 1954 in Madrid) is a Spanish paleoanthropologist and author known for his work in the Atapuerca Archaeological Site.

He is the son of the footballer Pedro María Arsuaga. He obtained a master's degree and a doctorate in Biological Sciences at the Universidad Complutense de Madrid, where he is professor in the Paleontology Department of the Faculty of Geological Sciences.

As a child he already showed a great interest in prehistory after reading The Quest for Fire and visiting a dig near Bilbao.

Arsuaga is a visiting professor of the Department of Anthropology at the University College London and since 1982 he has been a member of the Research Team investigating Pleistocene deposits in the Atapuerca Mountains (Province of Burgos, Spain). He has been a co-director since 1991 with José María Bermúdez de Castro and Eudald Carbonell Roura of the Atapuerca Team, which was awarded the Prince of Asturias Prize in "Scientific and Technical Research" category and the Castilla León Prize in "Social Sciences and Humanities" category, both in 1997.

The finds at Atapuerca have shed new light on the first humans in Europe. The site at Orce, in southern Spain, appears to be older (it has yielded tools indicating human presence that predate the finds at Atapuerca), but Atapuerca is remarkable for its human remains. In 2013, Arsuaga co-authored a paper which reported the finding of the oldest human (H. heidelbergensis) DNA ever, dating back 400,000 years. The mitochondrial DNA that stemmed from a fossil found in a cave in Sima de los Huesos had similarities to mitochondrial genomes previously found in the extinct Denisovans in Siberia.

A member of the Musée de l'Homme from Paris, of the International Association for the Study of Human Paleontology, he is vice-president of the Commission of Human Paleontology and Paleoecology of the International Union for Quaternary Research (INQUA). He has been a lecturer at the universities of London, Cambridge, Zurich, Rome, Arizona, Philadelphia, Berkeley, New York, Tel Aviv, among others.

He authored and/or published several scientific publications in Nature, Science, Journal of Archaeological Science, American Journal of Physical Anthropology, and Journal of Human Evolution.

== Bibliography ==
- Amalur, 2002 (ISBN 84-8460-191-9)
- Atapuerca, un millón de años de historia, 1999 (ISBN 84-7491-629-1)
- El enigma de la esfinge, 2001 (ISBN 84-01-34160-4)
- El collar del neandertal, 1999 (ISBN 8478807934)
  - The Neanderthal's Necklace: In Search of the First Thinkers, 2009 (ISBN 0786740736)
- La especie elegida, 1998 with Ignacio Martínez (ISBN 84-7880-909-0)
- El primer viaje de nuestra vida, 2012 (ISBN 978-84-9998180-2)
