= Archaeological site of Atapuerca =

Archaeological site in northern Spain, rich in human fossils

Archaeological Site of Atapuerca
UNESCO World Heritage Site
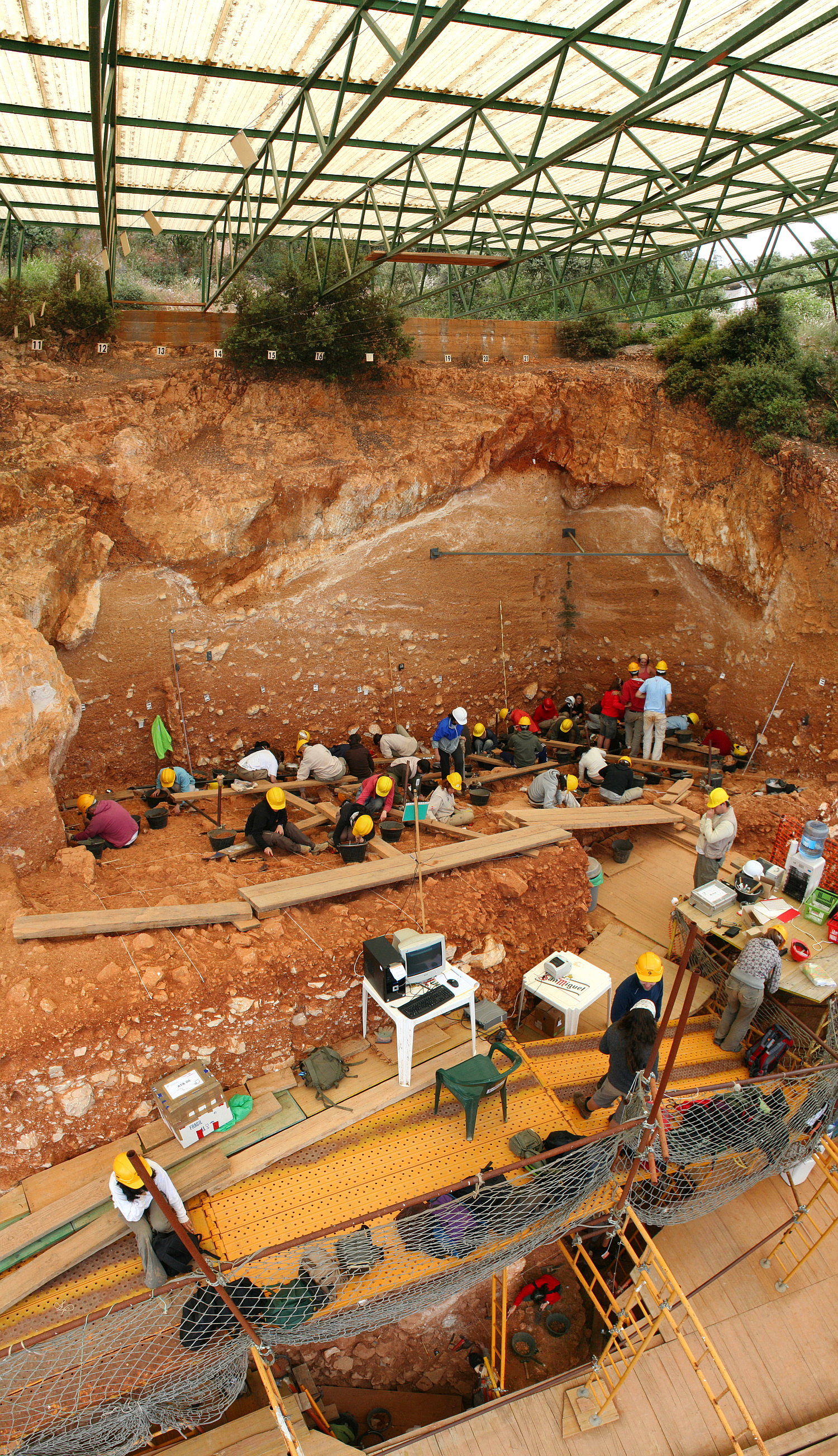
- Karst cave in Atapuerca

- Location within Castile and León Location within Spain Location within Europe
- Official name: Archaeological Site of Atapuerca
- Location: Atapuerca, Province of Burgos
- Part of: Atapuerca Mountains
- Criteria: Cultural
- Reference: 989
- Inscription: 2000 (24th Session)
- Coordinates: 42°21′09″N 3°31′06″W

The archaeological site of Atapuerca is located in the Province of Burgos in the north of Spain and is notable for its evidence of early human occupation. Bone fragments from around 800,000 years ago, found in its Gran Dolina cavern, provide the oldest known evidence of hominid settlement in Western Europe and of hominid cannibalism anywhere in the world.

It was designated a World Heritage Site in 2000.

== Discovery of the site ==
The archaeological significance of this part of the Province of Burgos became increasingly apparent in the 20th century as the result of the construction of a metre-gauge railway (now disused) through the Atapuerca Mountains. The railway, which was mainly intended to supply Basque industry with raw materials, proved to be unprofitable and did not operate for long. However, its construction involved deep cuttings through the karst geology of Atapuerca, exposing rocks and sediments of features known as Gran Dolina, Galería Elefante and Sima de los Huesos.

The subsequent excavation of 1964 under the direction of Francisco Jordá Cerdá succeeded with the discovery of anthropogenic artifacts and human fossils from a broad time range (early humans, hunter-gatherer groups, Bronze Age occupants). Further excavations followed, and interdisciplinary work has been undertaken by several teams, led by Emiliano Aguirre from 1978 to 1990 and later jointly by Eudald Carbonell, José María Bermúdez de Castro and Juan Luis Arsuaga. These have confirmed the continuous human occupation of the site. In July 2020 two quartzite stones were discovered, dating to 600,000 years ago, a find which filled in a gap in the evidence for human occupation of the site over a timeline of 1,200,000 years.

== Protection and access ==
The site was designated a UNESCO World Heritage Site, under the name, Archaeological Site of Atapuerca. The site is also protected at national level (as a Zona Arqueológica, a category of Bien de Interés Cultural on the heritage register) and at regional level (Castile and León has designated the Sierra de Atapuerca an Espacio cultural).

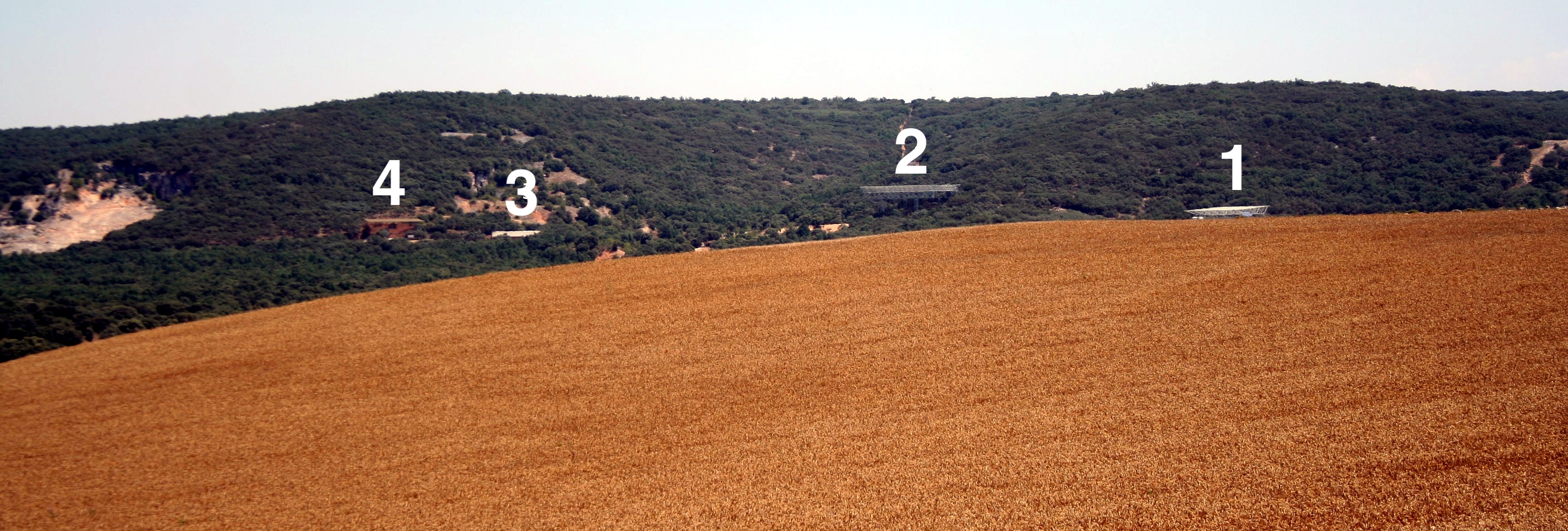
Location of the excavation sites in the railway cutting. Identifiable from the protective roofs are: (1) Entrance to the cutting; (2) Sima del Elefante; (3) Galería; (4) Gran Dolina

The regional designation of Espacio cultural is intended to allow sustainable tourism in the local villages. There is a Site Access Centre (CAYAC) in Ibeas de Juarros. There is also an Experimental Archaeology Centre (CAREX) in the village of Atapuerca. Finds are shown at the Museum of Human Evolution in the city of Burgos.

== Excavation sites ==
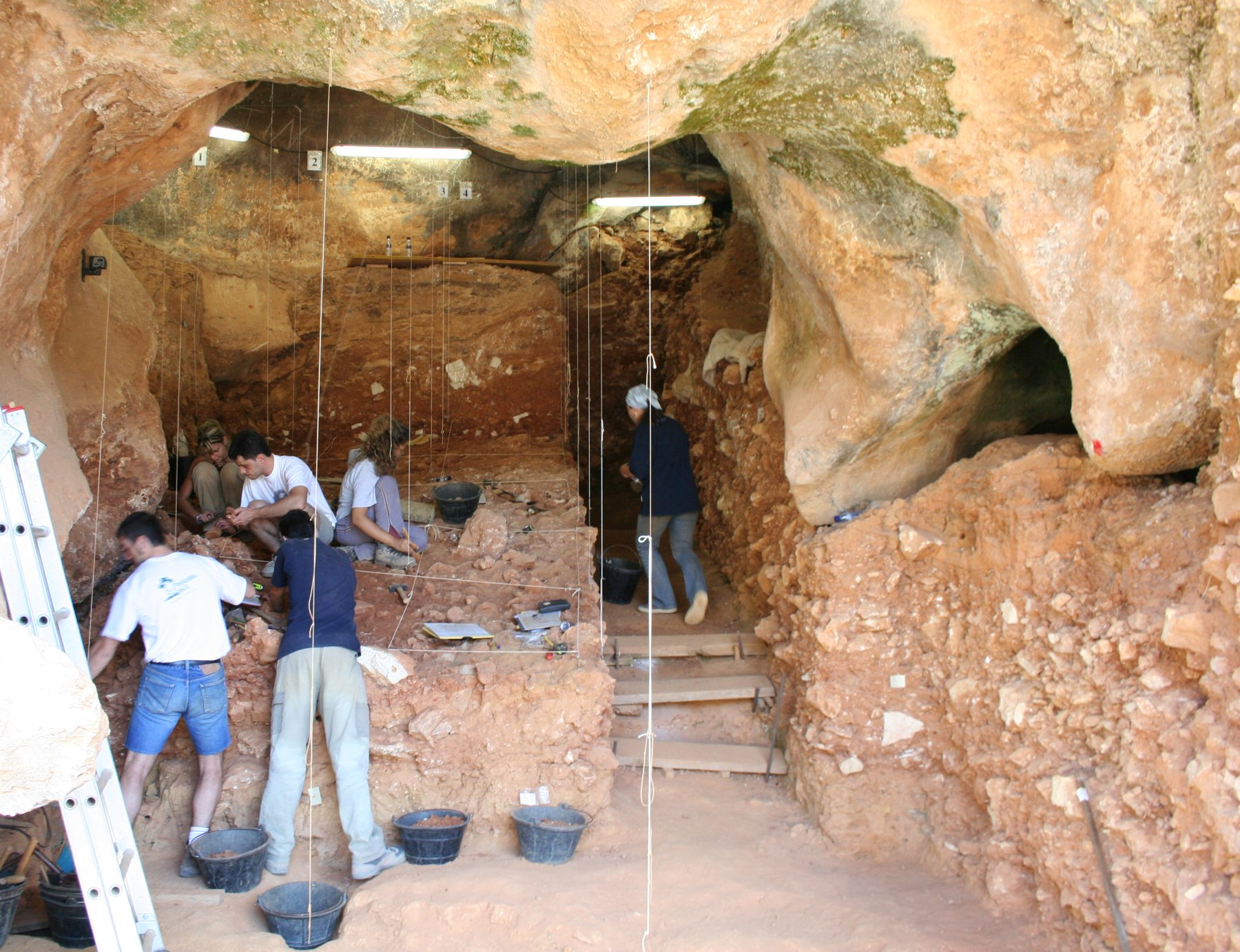
Trinchera Zarpazos, part of the Galería system, in 2006

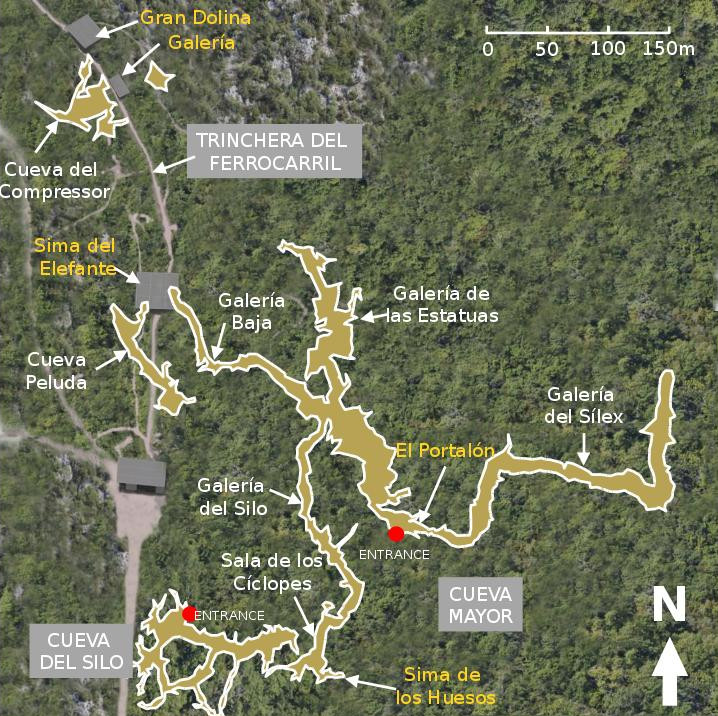
Map of the archaeological site of Atapuerca.

=== Portalón de Cueva Mayor (1910 to present) ===
The combined work of archaeologists Jesús Carballo (1910 to 1911), Geoffrey Clark (1971), José María Apellániz (1973 to 1983) and the current team of Juan Luis Arsuaga accounts for the documentation of the excavation sequence of ceramic objects from all relevant sediment layers since the Neolithic.

=== Trinchera Galería (1978 to present) ===
Among numerous faunal and floral fossils, a jaw fragment was found during the 1970s and a skull fragment in 1995, which both belong to Homo heidelbergensis. They date to between 600,000 and 400,000 years BP.

=== Trinchera Dolina (1981 to present) ===
The Gran Dolina (also Trinchera Dolina, English: Dolina trench) site is a huge cavern, which has been excavated since September 1981. Its sediments were divided into eleven stratae (TD-1 to TD-11)

- TD-11: Mousterian tools found.
- Level TD-10 is presumed to have been a Homo heidelbergensis camp with tools and bison fossils.
- Level TD-8, accessible since 1994, contained remarkable carnivore fossils.
- In level TD-7, a bovine leg in anatomical position was recovered in 1994.
- TD-6 (Aurora stratum): From 1994 on, over 160 bone fragments of at least eleven hominids were found, between 850,000 and 780,000 years old, which makes them at least 250,000 years older than any other hominid yet discovered in Western Europe. More than 30% of the bones have manipulation marks that suggest cannibalism. Classification of these remains is still being debated; suggestions range from Homo erectus to Homo heidelbergensis and Homo antecessor. Some researchers, who are familiar with the stratigraphic material of Gran Dolina, argue that Homo antecessor may be the ancestor of Homo heidelbergensis, who in turn gave rise to Homo neanderthalensis. Retouched flake and core stone tools were also found.

The hominid remains show unmistakable signs of having been butchered and consumed in the same way as animals whose bones were also found in this stratum. All bones belonged to young individuals, ranging from infancy to late teenhood. A study of this case considers it an instance of "nutritional" cannibalism, where individuals belonging to hostile or unrelated groups were hunted, killed, and eaten much like animals. Based on the placement and processing of human and animal remains, the authors conclude that cannibalism was likely a "repetitive behavior over time as part of a culinary tradition", not caused by starvation or other exceptional circumstances. They suggest that young individuals (more than half of which were children under ten) were targeted because they "posed a lower risk for hunters" and because this was an effective means for limiting the growth of competing groups.

- Level TD-5 is assumed to have been a carnivore den.
- In TD-4 (dated to 780,000 BP), four lithic pieces were found during the 1991 excavation and several remnants of Ursus dolinensis, a sparsely described bear species.
- At the lowest levels (TD-1 and TD-2), no fossils were found.

=== Sima de los Huesos (1983 to present) ===
Sima de los Huesos (Pit of Bones) accounts for the greatest number of valuable scientific discoveries and knowledge acquired with far-reaching implications. This site is located at the bottom of a 13 m (43 ft) deep shaft, or "chimney", accessible via the narrow corridors of the Cueva Mayor.

Since 1997, the excavators have located more than 5,500 human skeletal remains deposited during the Middle Pleistocene period, at least 350,000 years old, which represent 28 individuals of Homo heidelbergensis (also classified as early Neanderthals). Associated finds include Ursus deningeri fossils and a hand axe called Excalibur. It has received a surprisingly high degree of attention, and a number of experts support the hypothesis that this particular Acheulean tool made of red quartzite seems to have served as a ritual offering, most likely for a funeral. The idea sparked a renewal of the disputed evolutionary progress and the stages of human cognitive, intellectual and conceptual development. Ninety percent of the known Homo heidelbergensis fossil record have been obtained at the site. The fossil bone pit includes:

- The complete cranium, Skull 5, nicknamed Miguelón, the fragmented cranial remains of Skull 4, nicknamed Agamenón and Skull 6, nicknamed Rui (a reference to the medieval military leader El Cid).
- A complete pelvis (Pelvis 1), humorously nicknamed Elvis
- Mandibles, teeth, a lot of postcranial bones (femora, hand and foot bones, vertebrae, ribs, etc.)
- Remains of a child with craniosynostosis were found and dated to 530,000 BP. The find was considered to provide evidence for caring of individuals with disabilities in early human populations.
- Mitochondrial DNA (mtDNA) from a 400,000 year old femur has been sequenced, the oldest hominin mtDNA recovered as of 2013. The mtDNA was found to be closer to the mtDNA of Denisova hominins than to the mtDNA of Neanderthals.
- In 2016, nuclear DNA analysis results determined the Sima hominins to be Neanderthals and not Denisova hominins, and the divergence between Neanderthals and Denisovans predates 430,000 years.
- In 2019, analysis of Neanderthal teeth found at Sima de los Huesos indicates that modern humans and Neanderthals separated from a common ancestor more than 800,000 years ago.
- In 2020, analysis of tooth enamel of hominids found at the sites of Sima del Elefante, Gran Dolina-TD6 and Sima de los Huesos concluded that Atapuerca hominids grew faster than modern humans.

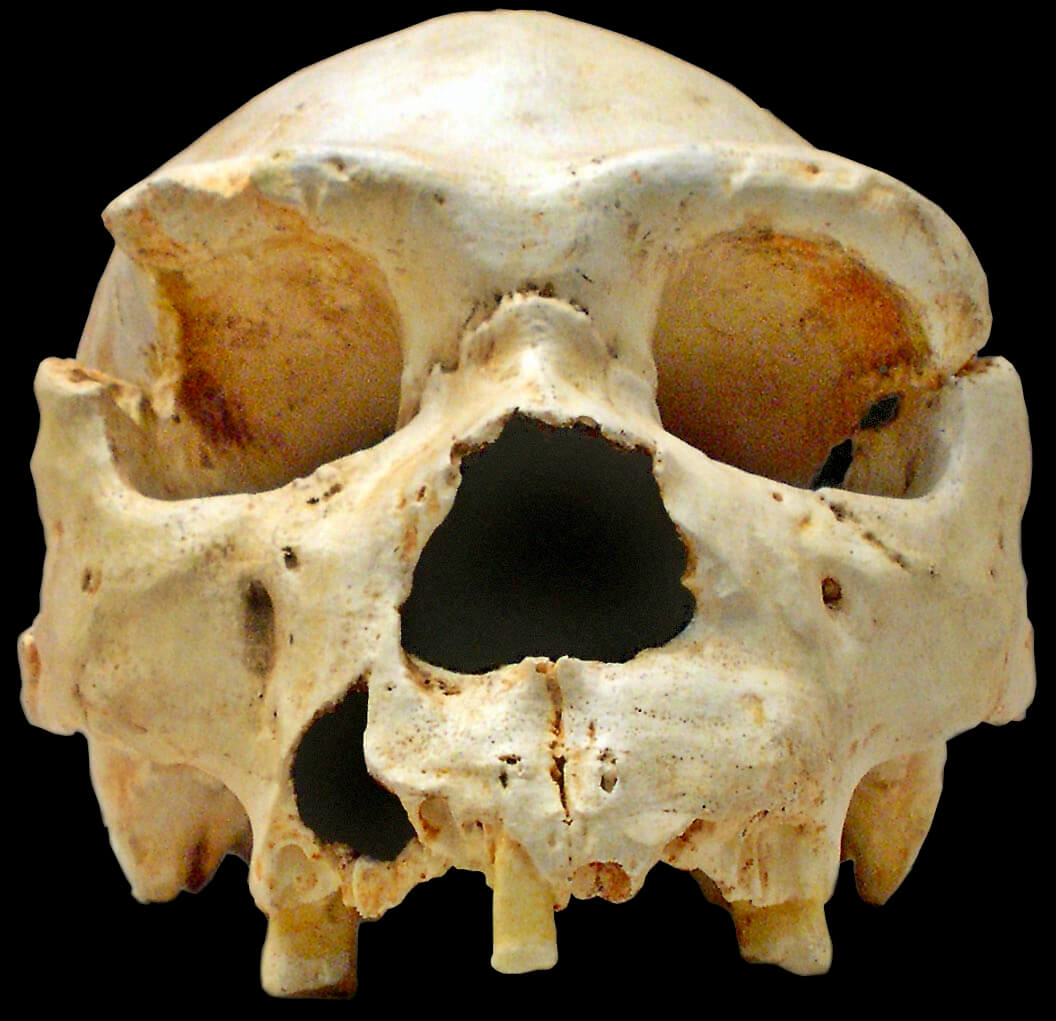
The Homo heidelbergensis Cranium 5, one of the most important discoveries; its nearly complete mandible was only found years later

Some excavators have stated that the concentration of bones in the pit allows the suggestion of a traditional burial culture among the cave's inhabitants. A competing theory cites the lack of small bones in the assemblage and suggests that the fossils were washed into the pit by non-human agents.

=== Sima del Elefante (1996 to present) ===
According to José María Bermúdez de Castro, co-director of research at Atapuerca, the Sima del Elefante findings support "anatomical evidence of the hominids that fabricated tools more than one million years ago", which may have been the earliest among Western European hominids. The first discovery in June 2007 was a tooth, followed by a fragment of a 1.2 million-year-old jawbone (mandible) and a proximal phalanx in 2008. In July 2022, archaeologists announced the discovery of a 1.4 million-year-old jawbone (maxilla) included a tooth of a hominid. The paleoanthropoligist Eudald Carbonell, who serves as co-director of the excavations at the Archaeological Site of Atapuerca, hypothesizes that the aforementioned jawbone belongs to a specimen of Homo erectus. Other researchers suggest it may have come from Homo antecessor, an early species of human. It located about two meters deeper in the soil than the fossils found in 2008. Over the next two years, an interdisciplinary team worked on studying and restoring the fossil. The fossil has been dated to between 1.4 and 1.1 million years ago. Based on the available evidence, it has been proposed to assign the new human remains to Homo aff. erectus, that is, a species that is provisionally proposed as new, although closely related to Homo Erectus. This fossil represents the oldest human face from Western Europe identified to date.

=== Cueva del Mirador (1999 to present) ===
This site provides information on the earliest local farmers and herders of the late Neolithic and Bronze Age.

=== Orchids Valley (2000 to 2001) and Hundidero (2004 to 2005) ===
Stone tools of the Upper Paleolithic have been extracted from this locality.

=== Cueva fantasma (2017 to present) ===
Homo neanderthalensis craneal fossil (no context) and lithic tools at located here.

=== Galería de las estatuas (2017 to present) ===
Mousterian tools with Homo neanderthalensis bones and DNA remains.

== See also ==
- Museum of Human Evolution
