= José María Bermúdez de Castro =

Spanish paleoanthropologist

The Most Excellent José María Bermúdez de Castro
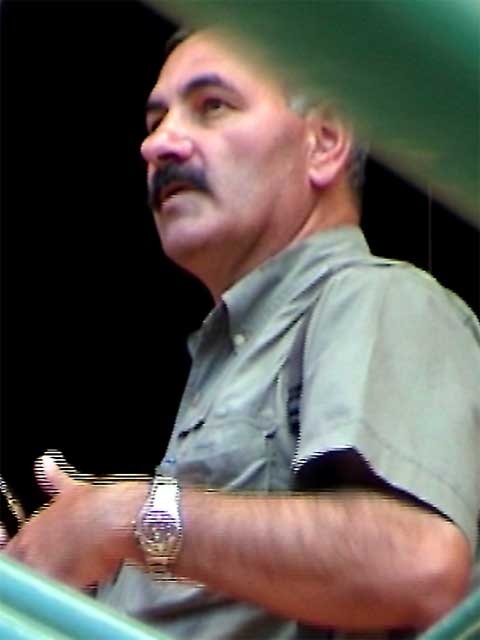
- Born: José María Bermúdez de Castro Risueño; 18 June 1952 (age 73); Madrid, Spain

Seat K of the Real Academia Española
- Incumbent
- Assumed office 9 October 2022
- Preceded by: Federico Corriente

José María Bermúdez de Castro Risueño (born 18 June 1952) is a Spanish paleoanthropologist. He is known as the first author of the species description of Homo antecessor from the Gran Dolina at the Archaeological site of Atapuerca. On 16 December 2021 he was elected as member of the Real Academia Española, taking the seat K on 9 October 2022.
