= Emiliano Aguirre =

Spanish paleontologist (1925–2021)

The Most Excellent Emiliano Aguirre
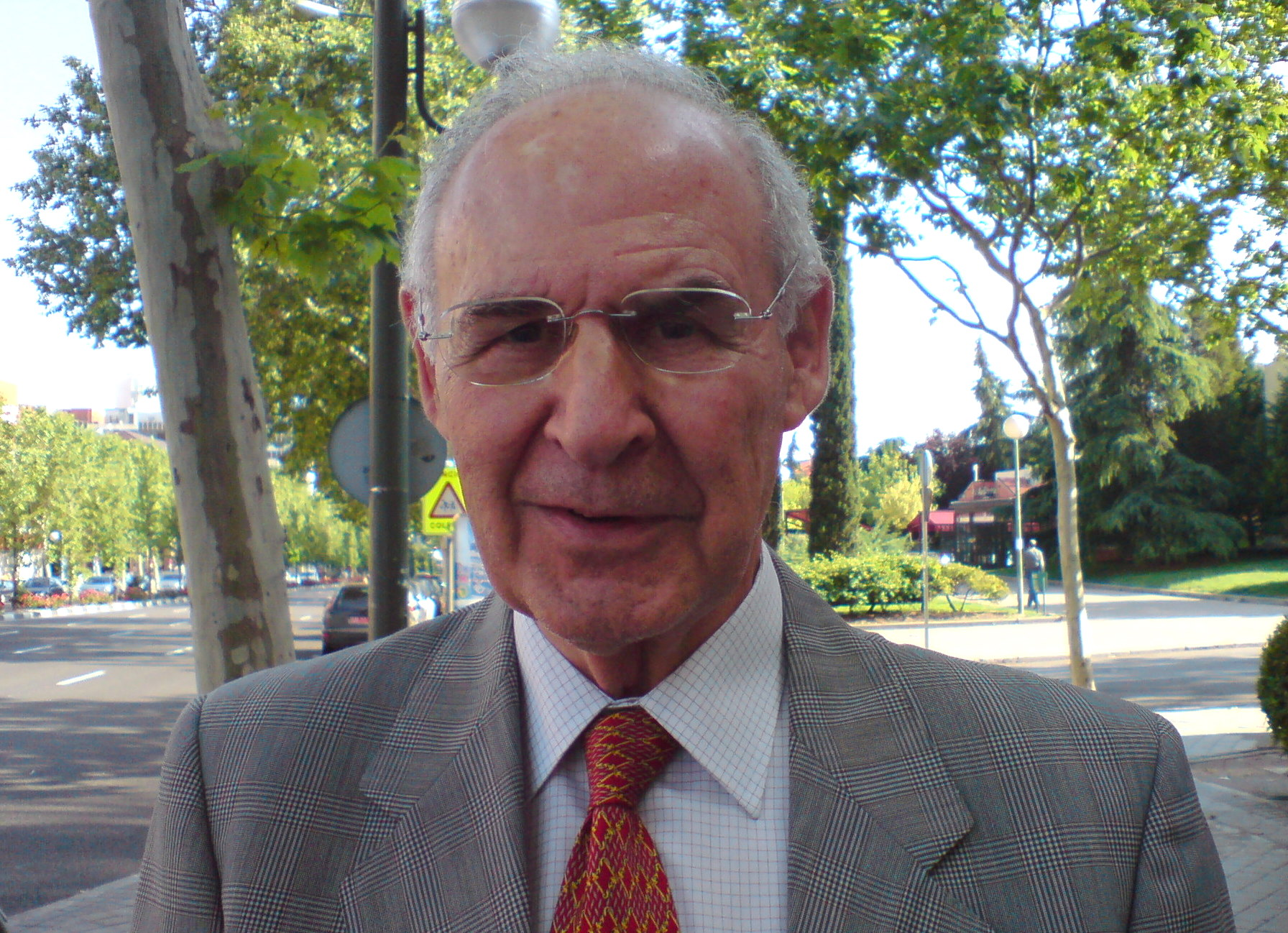
- Aguirre in 2007
- Born: Emiliano Aguirre Enríquez; 5 October 1925; Ferrol, A Coruña, Spain
- Died: 11 October 2021 (aged 96); Madrid, Spain
- Known for: Beginning the study of Atapuerca sites
- Scientific career
- Fields: Paleontologist

Emiliano Aguirre Enríquez (5 October 1925 – 11 October 2021) was a Spanish paleontologist, known for his works at archaeological site of Atapuerca, whose excavations he directed from 1978 until his retirement in 1990. He received the Prince of Asturias Award in 1997.

== Biography ==
Aguirre was born in Ferrol, Galicia, on 5 October 1925. He studied humanities and philosophy at the Facultad Eclesiástica de Alcalá, natural sciences at the University of Madrid in 1955, and theology at the University of Granada. He was a former Jesuit with a PhD in biological sciences with a thesis on extinct elephants, supervised by Miquel Crusafont i Pairó.

Between 1955 and 1956, Aguirre was a prospector of dinosaur sites in the Tremp Basin, where he helped excavating the remains of Abditosaurus, and a prospector and discoverer of thirty new marine and continental Cenozoic sites in Granada between 1956 and 1961.

Aguirre's first excavations were carried out in the 1960s. Between 1961 and 1963, he excavated, together with Francis Clark Howell, the paleontological site of Torralba and Ambrona, using new multidisciplinary methodologies. In 1963, he designed the Arbona Museum, the first museum with in situ exhibition of fossil remains in Europe. In 1963, he was part of the Spanish Mission of Archaeological Salvage in Nubia, in which he studied the human remains at the necropolis of Argin (Sudan). In 1968, thanks to a postdoctoral fellowship from the Wenner-Gren Foundation, he traveled to South Africa to study early hominid fossils and to Kenya to excavate in the Tugen Hills with the archaeologist Louis Leakey.

Aguirre joined the Spanish National Research Council as a researcher in 1974, and left the Society of Jesus.

Between 1978 and 1982, Aguirre was a professor of paleontology at the University of Zaragoza and at the Complutense University of Madrid between 1982 and 1984. On 24 May 2000, he was sworn in as an honorary academic of the Spanish Royal Academy of Sciences, a position he held until his death. He supervised 26 doctoral theses.

Aguirre was a member of the Academy of Fine Arts and History 'Institución Fernán González'.

=== Dissemination of evolutionary theory in Franco's Spain ===
In the early years of his professional career in the 1950s, Aguirre promoted conferences, meetings, and scientific publications at a time when the national Catholicism of Francisco Franco's regime hindered the dissemination of Charles Darwin's theory.

In 1962, Aguirre published his lecture "Paleontological problems and natural selection", in which he stated his defense of the modern synthetic theory of evolution, as opposed to the theistic dirigiste approaches commonly adopted at the time.

In 1966, the book La Evolución was published by Editorial Católica, in its collection Biblioteca de Autores Cristianos ("B. A. C."), which was a real milestone for the social diffusion of evolutionary ideas in Spain. The work was co-directed by the paleontologists Miguel Crusafont, Bermudo Meléndez, and Aguirre, and included articles that covered biological evolution from very different approaches, including Crusafont's orthogenetic dirigiste ideas, but above all, it exposed the synthetic theory, assumed by most of the authors, among whom, besides Aguirre, were Ramón Margalef, Antonio Prevosti, Salustio and Rafael Alvarado, Francisco Bernis or José Antonio Valverde. According to the paleontologist José Luis Sanz, referring in 2006 to this work: "It took Spanish evolutionary paleontology a little longer than the rest of the evolutionary disciplines to enter modernity. It finally did, thanks to Emiliano Aguirre".

=== Director of the Atapuerca archaeological site ===
Aguirre started working in Atapuerca in 1976. Being the first paleontologist to decipher the importance of the archaeological site, Aguirre became its first director in 1978 and remained in this post until 1990, when he resigned and José María Bermúdez de Castro, Juan Luis Arsuaga and Eudald Carbonell took over the role. At that time, science was not much promoted, so he was in charge of training all those who studied Atapuerca.

== Personal life and death ==
Aguirre married Carmen Bule in 1975. He died in Burgos, Spain on 11 October 2021, six days after his 96th birthday.

== Honors and awards ==
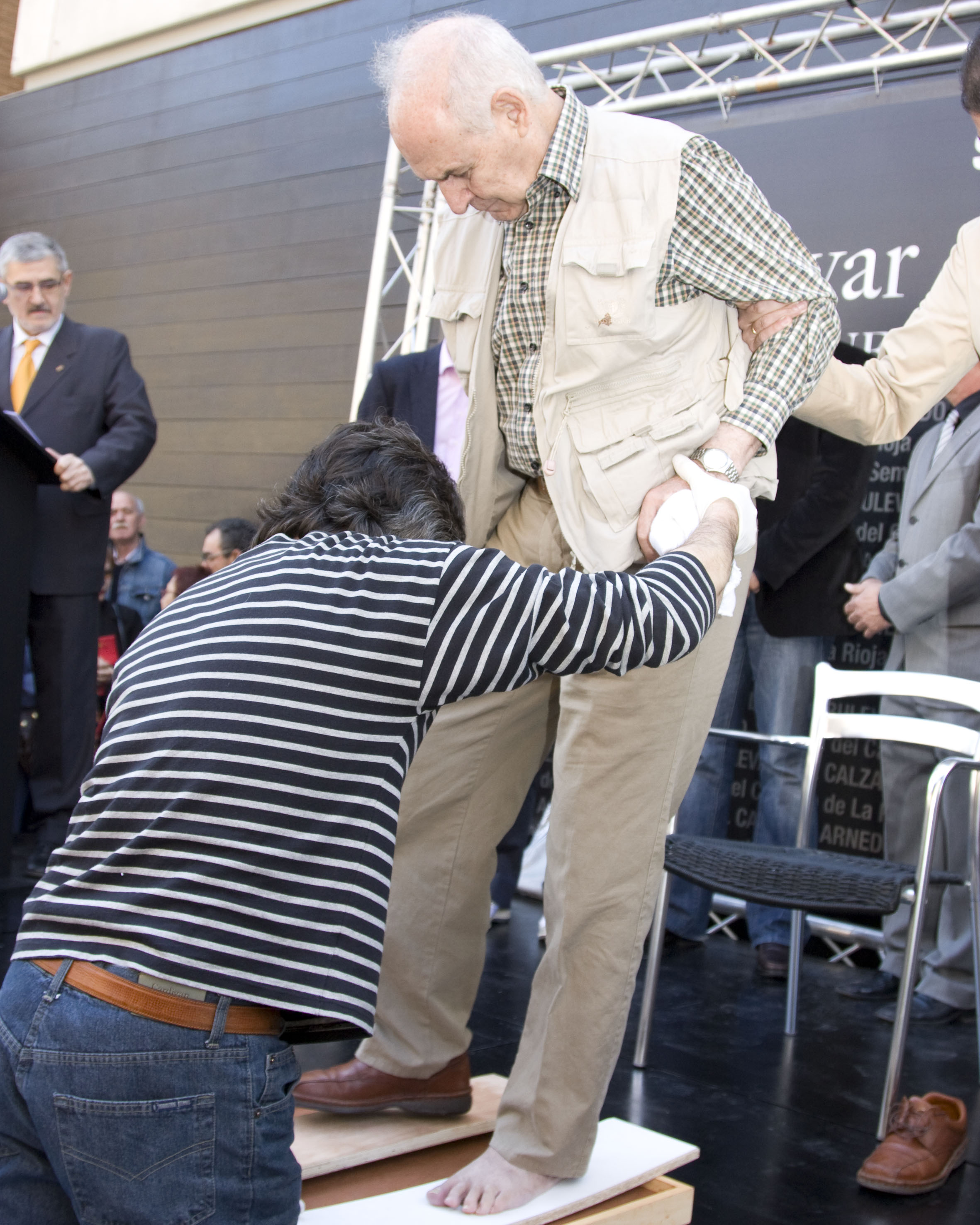
Aguirre leaving his footprint in the "Bulevar del Calzado" in Arnedo, in 2008.

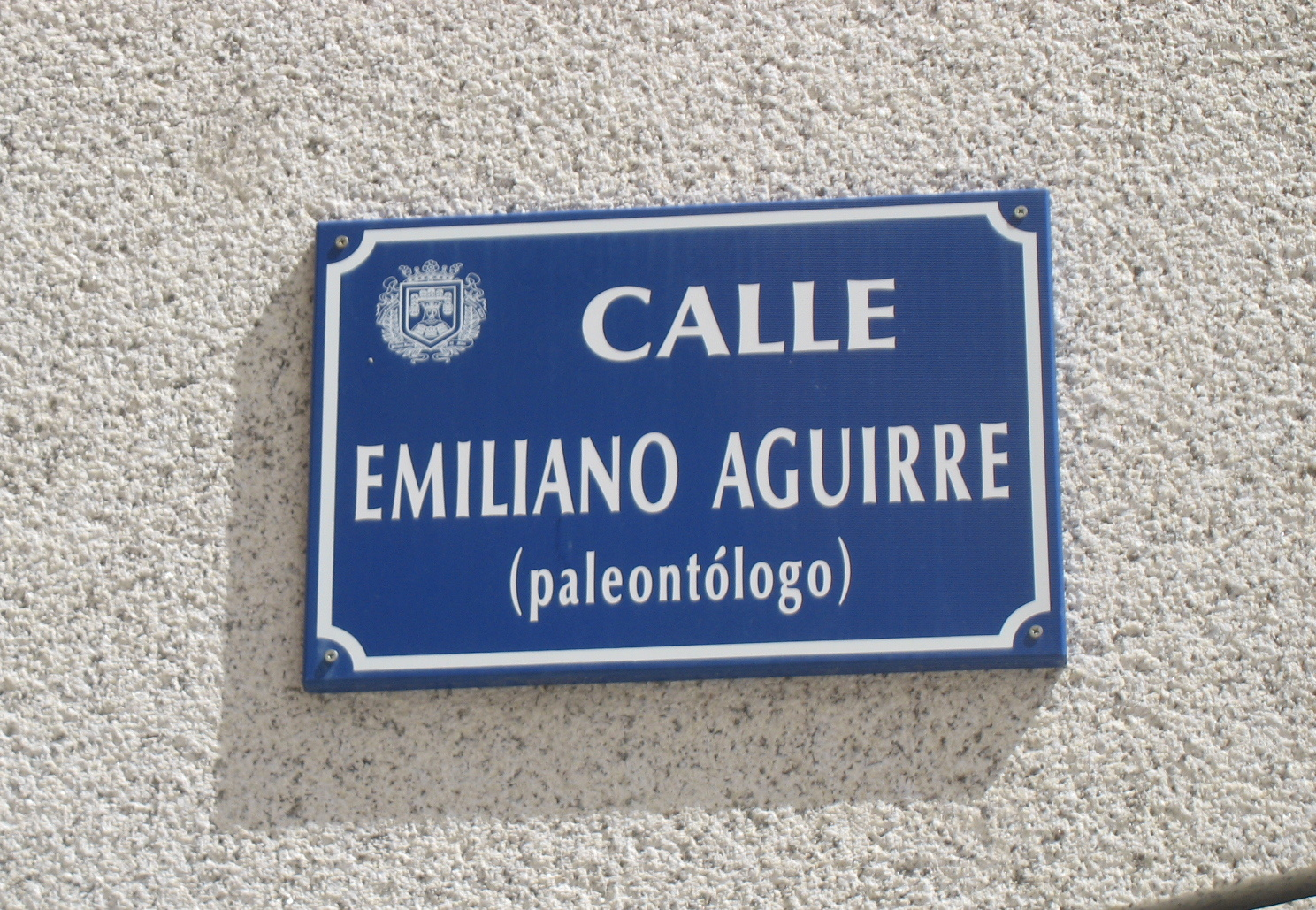
"Emiliano Street" sign in Burgos, Spain.

- Prince of Asturias Award (1997)
- Medal of Honor for the Invention of the García-Cabrerizo Foundation (1997)
- Medal of Merit in Labour (1999)
- Four volumes of festschrift edited by Regional Archaeological Museum of the Community of Madrid (2004)
- His footprint and shoe print at Bulevar del Calzado of Arnedo (2008)
- "Arquero de Oro" of the Asociación Española para el Estudio del Cuaternario (2009)
- "Premio Evolución" of the Atapuerca Foundation (2011)
- "Emiliano Aguirre street" by Burgos' city council (2011)

=== Taxa named after him ===
- Hipparion concudense aguirrei (1961).
- Cricetodon (Hispanomys) aguirrei (1977).
- Pseudodryomys aguirrei (1978).
- Paracamelus aguirrei (1984).

=== Honoris causa ===
- Honoris causa for the University of A Coruña (2000)
- Honoris causa for the University of Burgos (2007)

== Selected works ==
- Meléndez, B. y Aguirre, E. (1958): «Hallazgo de Elephas en la terraza media del río Manzanares (Villaverde, Madrid)». Las Ciencias, 23(4): 597-605
- Howell, FC; Butzer, KW y Aguirre, E. (1961): «Noticia preliminar sobre el emplazamiento acheulense de Torralba (Soria)». Excavaciones arqueológicas en España, 10: 3-38
- Aguirre, E. (1968): «Une interprétation biomécanique de l’evolution de la région glabellaire dans l’anthropogenèse». En: Guinzberg, V.V. (Ed.) Seventh International Congress of Anthropological and Ethnological Sciences. Nauka. Moscú
- Aguirre, E. (1969): «Evolutionary History of the Elephant». Science, 164(3886): 1366-1376
- Aguirre, E. y Fuentes, C. (1969): «Los vertebrados fósiles de Torralba y Ambrona». En: Études sur le Quaternaire dans le monde. VIII Congrés INQUA: 433-437
- Aguirre, E. y Leakey, P. (1974): «Nakali: nueva fauna de Hipparion del Rift Valley de Kenya». Estudios Geológicos, 30: 219–227
- Aguirre, E. y Soto, E. (1974): «Nuevo fósil de Cercopitécido en el Pleistoceno inferior de La Puebla de Valverde (Teruel)». Estudios Geológicos, 30: 213-217
- Aguirre, E.; Basabe, J.M. y Torres, T. de (1976): «Los fósiles humanos de Atapuerca (Burgos): nota preliminar». Zephyrus, 26-27: 489-511
- Aguirre, E. y Lumley, M.A. de (1977): «Fossil men from Atapuerca, Spain: their bearing on human evolution in the Middle Pleistocene». Journal of Human Evolution, 6: 681
- Aguirre, E. (1979): «Situación estratigráfica y geocronológica de los primitivos Homínidos fósiles de Africa». Boletín de la Real Sociedad Española de Historia Natural. (Sección Geológica), 77: 17-22
- Aguirre, E.; Alberdi, M.T.; Jiménez, E.; Martín, C.; Morales, J.; Sesé, C. y Soria, D. (1982): «Torrijos: nueva fauna con Hispanotherium de la cuenca media del Tajo». Acta Geológica Hispanica, 17(1–2): 39-61
- Aguirre, E. (1988): «Crónica y desarrollo de la Paleontología Humana». En: VV.AA. Historia de la Paleontología. Madrid: Real Academia de Ciencias Exactas, Físicas y Naturales. Historia de la Ciencia: 89-119
- Rosas, A., Aguirre, E. y Bermúdez de Castro, J.M. (1991): «Mandibules et dents d'Ibeas (Espagne) dans le contexte de l'évolution humaine en Europe». L’Anthropologie, 95: 89–102
- Rosas, A. y Aguirre, E. (1999): «Restos humanos neandertales de la cueva del Sidrón, Piloña, Asturias. Nota preliminar». Estudios Geológicos, 55(3–4): 181-190
- Aguirre, E. y Carbonell, E. (2001): «Early human expansions into Eurasia: The Atapuerca evidence». Quaternary International, 75: 11-18
