= Torralba and Ambrona =

Paleontological and archaeological sites in Soria province, Spain

Coordinates: 41°09′36″N 2°29′54.622″W

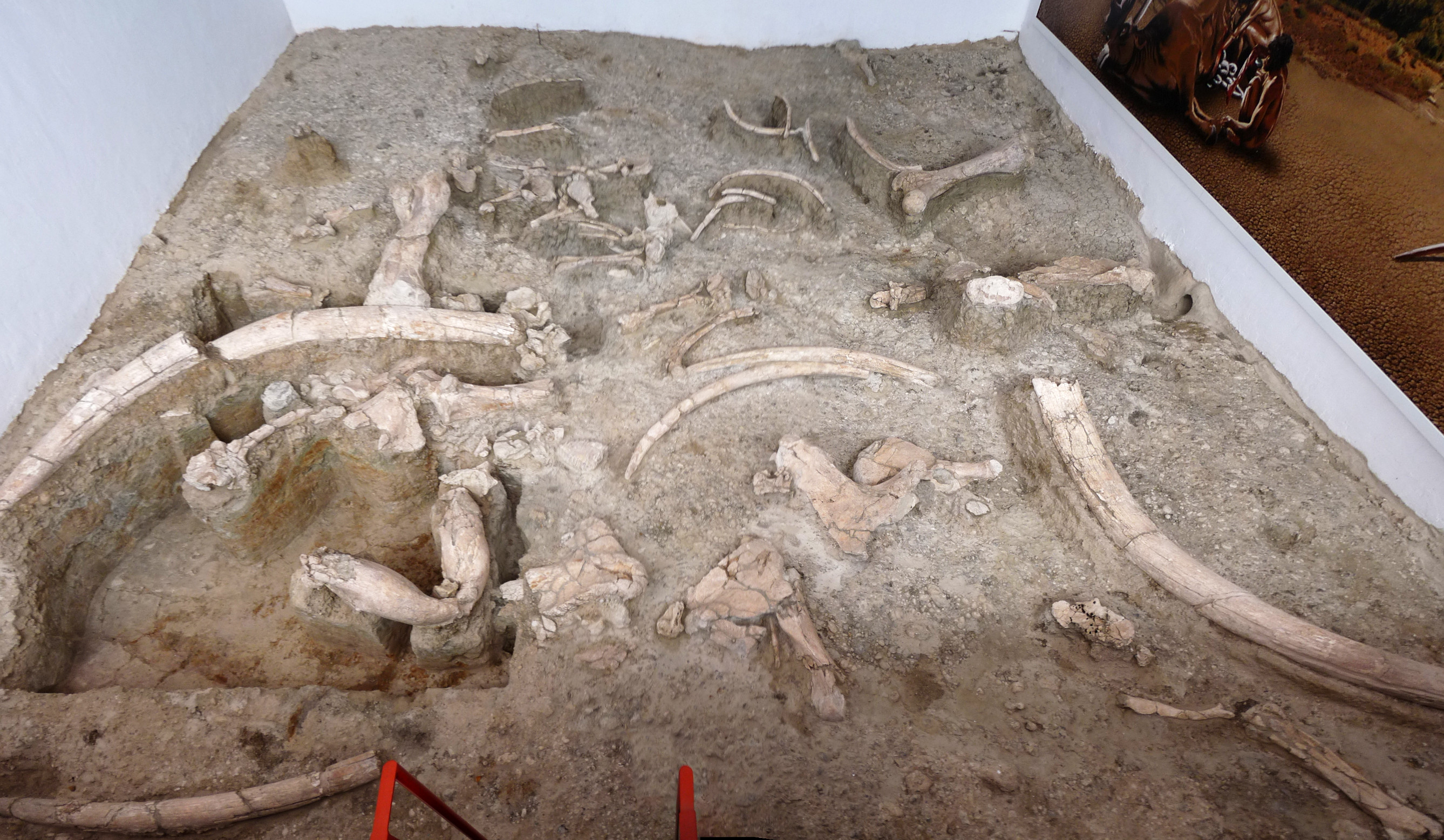
Museum of Ambrona: in situ exhibition of remains of ancient elephant, Straight-tusked elephant.

Torralba and Ambrona (Province of Soria, Castile and León, Spain) are two paleontological and archaeological sites that correspond to various fossiliferous levels with Acheulean lithic industry (Lower Paleolithic) associated, at least about 350,000 years old (Ionian, Middle Pleistocene). The sites, traditionally studied together, are about 3 km distant, and belong to the settlements of Ambrona (municipality of Miño de Medinaceli) and Torralba del Moral (municipality of Medinaceli).

From these sites have been obtained fossils of large mammals, mainly elephants (Straight-tusked elephant), with remains of nearly fifty individuals from each site, in addition to large bovines and horses. The sites can be seen as an elephants' graveyard, although the use of the term for a concentration of bones raises a problem of definition. The sites show evidence of successive occupations by human beings, who had a hunting station or, more likely, scavenged carrion and carried out quartering.

Known since the end of the 19th century, they were excavated first by the Marquis of Cerralbo between 1909 and 1914, later, in the early '60s and early '80s, by the American Francis Clark Howell with the collaboration of the paleontologist Emiliano Aguirre and later, in the '90s, new campaigns were carried out by Manuel Santonja and Alfredo Pérez-González. The remains from the different excavations are scattered, mainly, between the Museo Nacional de Ciencias Naturales, the Museo Arqueológico Nacional, the Museo Numantino de Soria and the museum in situ of Ambrona.

They were declared Bien de Interés Cultural in the category of "archaeological zone" on September 7, 1995. They are also declared as "a place of international geological interest of international relevance" ("Geosite") by the Geological and Mining Institute of Spain, with the designations "VP -07: Loma del Saúco, Torralba" and "VP-07b: Loma de los Huesos, Ambrona", within the category "vertebrate sites of the Pliocene-Spanish Pleistocene".

== History ==
=== 1888: discovery ===
In the late 19th century it was decided that a new railway line should link Torralba and Soria. The contract was awarded to a Belgian company. The first remains appeared in 1888, with the works of canalization of the water that the company was carrying out for the first railway station of Torralba (moved later twice, before 1926 and in 1959). Part of that material was acquired by the Escuela Superior de Minas de Madrid and the rest distributed among individuals.

=== 1909–1916: the Marquis of Cerralbo ===
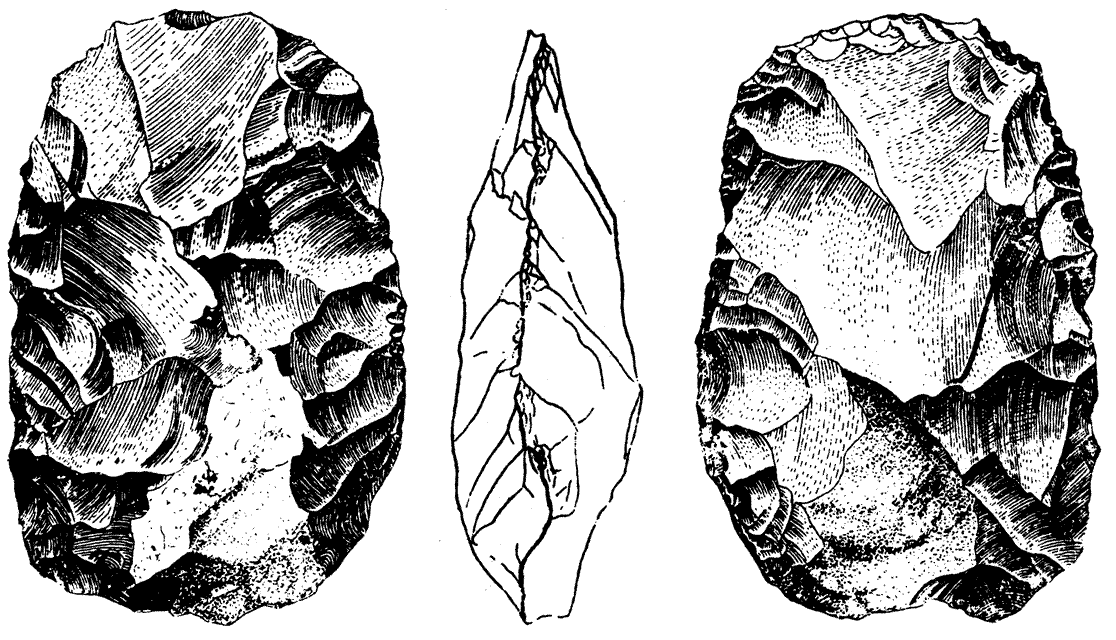
Hand axe of chalcedony of Torralba. Illustration by Obermaier (1925, page 194).

The Torralba site is infinitely precious for Spanish prehistory and it is a joy that is in the hands of someone so enlightened and with such powerful means of action as the Marquis of Cerralbo. His study, scientific and methodical, will continue without rest. He could discover the skeletons of some elephant hunters!

— Henri Breuil, 1910

The first excavations were carried out by Enrique de Aguilera y Gamboa, Marquis of Cerralbo, first in Torralba from 1909 to 1913 and later in Ambrona from 1914 to 1916, and have been considered as the best performed of the first half of the 20th century.

In 1907, when the Marquis of Cerralbo vacationed in the area, he had news of the appearance of "colossal" elephant carcasses; after visiting the place and aware, from the beginning, of the antiquity of the remains, he decided to undertake and pay for the excavations himself, hoping to find evidence of its synchrony with the "most primitive" man. He initiated them in 1909 – a year after taking office as Permanent Academician of the Real Academia de la Historia – and established his paleontological workshop in Santa María de Huerta, a relatively close location where he owned an estate.

Cerralbo excavated between 1000 and 2000 m^{2} of the Torralba site and an unknown, but much smaller, area of Ambrona. Paleontological elements recovered accounted for 525 elephant remains (Straight-tusked elephant), 86 horse (Equus caballus torralbae), 37 of a great bovid (Aurochs), 25 deer (Cervus elaphus) and 3 rhinoceros (Stephanorhinus hemitoechus), and the lithic industry accounted for a total of 557 specimens, including hand axes, cleavers, flakes, cores and Chopping tools.

Cerralbo was accompanied in his excavations by the archaeologist Juan Cabré, the geologist Pedro Palacios and the French paleontologist Édouard Harlé.

The international diffusion of the works in Torralba was due, on the one hand, to the communication that Marquis of Cerralbo himself presented at the International Congress of Prehistory that was held in Geneva in 1912, which he accompanied with a sample of his discoveries, and, on the other hand, to the book by the German paleontologist Hugo Obermaier, The fossil man -reference work during the first third of the 20th century-, in which he describe the findings of Torralba, originally published in Spanish in 1916, with a second edition expanded in 1925 that was translated into English.

=== 1961–1983: Howell and Aguirre ===
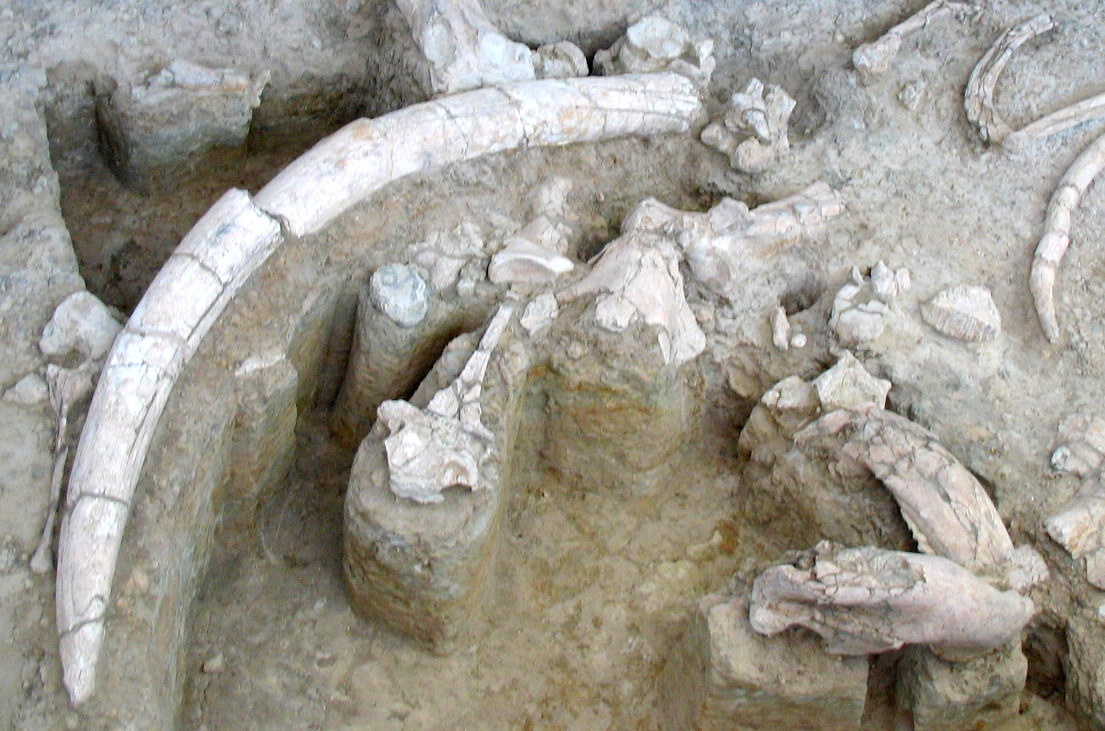
Detail of Howell's 1963 excavation conserved in situ, with Straight-tusked elephant remains (the most important taxon in the site): a defense, a vertebra, a jaw (upside down) and some ribs, among others.

The American anthropologist Francis Clark Howell conducted six excavation campaigns in Torralba and Ambrona, between 1961 and 1963 and in 1980, 1981 and 1983. The results of his studies seemed to have demonstrated the practice of active hunting by the human groups of the time-hypothesis discussed later, in favor of occasional scavenging. Also carbonaceous remains to indicate the presence of homes: the intentional and controlled use of fire.

In 1959, during the Pan-African Congress of Prehistory and Quaternary Studies, in which John Desmond Clark was presenting the concept of "occupation sites", the Spanish archaeologist Lluís Pericot (University of Barcelona) interested the anthropologists F. Clark Howell (University of Chicago) and Pierre Biberson (Museum of the Man of Paris), in the works that the Marquis of Cerralbo had done in Torralba and his concept of "station", very similar to the one they were discussing.

Howell visited Ambrona and Torralba in 1960. He obtained funding and permits to excavate, helped by Biberson, who was also able to provide some funding for the work. An international multidisciplinary team and a modern work methodology were proposed.

In the different campaigns from 1961 to 1963 they were part of Howell's teams: Pierre Biberson (Museum of the Man of Paris, deputy director of the excavations and head of the Ambrona area), Emiliano Aguirre (Museo Nacional de Ciencias Naturales, paleontology of vertebrates), Dolores Echaide (University of Zaragoza, representative in 1961 of the Dirección General de Bellas Artes), Francisco Jordá Cerdá (professor at the University of Salamanca, delegate of Fine Arts in 1962–63), Desmond Collins (University of Cambridge, United Kingdom), Peter Taylor, Richard G. Klein, Blanca Izquierdo, José Viloria (MNCN, preparation and restoration of fossils), Karl W. Butzer (University of Wisconsin, edaphology and geology), Josefina Menéndez Amor (MNCN) and F. Florschutz (palynology and paleobotany, Leslie Gordon Freeman (University of Chicago, record), Thomas Lynch (University of Chicago), Susan Tax (cartoonist), several Spanish and American students denses and more than twenty workers in the area.

Grids were drawn, stratigraphic profiles were raised and each extracted remainder was labeled. As an example of thoroughness, samples of pollen were taken from the clay adhered between the teeth of the elephants, to get as close as possible to the existing environment during the accumulation of the remains.

In 1973 Aguirre directed the systematic excavation of more than 200 m^{2} around the Museum of Ambrona, built ten years earlier, necessary to correct the humidity that endangered it, recovering more fossils and lithic industry.

The last campaigns of Howel were realized in 1980, 1981 and 1983. The possibility of finding some human fossil facilitated new economic supports, even of the National Geographic Society. For the excavations and analysis of samples of these campaigns, he had the following team: co-directors: Leslie Gordon Freeman (lithic industry) and Martín Almagro Basch (director of the Museo Arqueológico Nacional de España); researchers: Emiliano Aguirre, Karl W. Butzer, Richard G. Klein, M. Teresa Alberdi, A. Azzaroli, J. Bischoff, T. E. Cerling, Katherine Cruz-Uribe, Ignacio Doadrio, Frank Harrold, Manuel Hoyos, P. Preece, Antonio Sánchez-Marco (birds), F. Borja Sanchiz (amphibians), H. P. Schwarcz, Carmen Sesé (micromammals), Kathy Schick, N. P. Toth and Charles Turner.

In all its campaigns, Howell excavated more than 1000 m^{2} in Torralba, recovering about 700 lithic instruments and more than 2100 fossils, and about 2700 m^{2} in Ambrona, with more than 4400 lithic instruments and several thousand fossils (of them more of 2000 elephants).

The investigations of these years gave rise to a large number of scientific publications on all related aspects, paleontology, archeology, geology, paleoclimatology, etc., but highlighting, due to its social impact, those related to the presumed hunting activities of primitive man.

=== 1990–2002: Santonja and Pérez-González ===
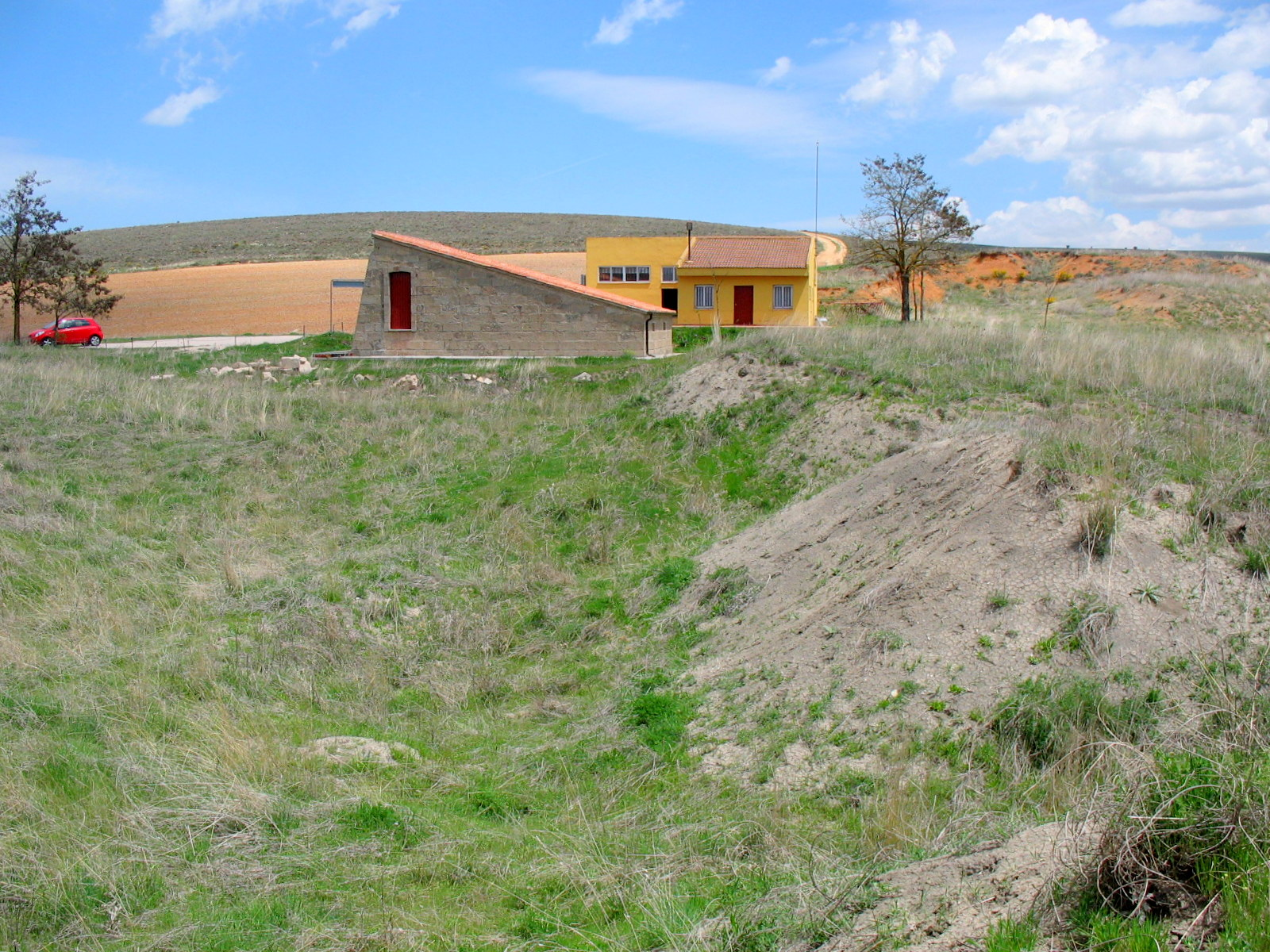
Aspect of the Ambrona site in 2012. The trenches of the excavations can be seen in the foreground and behind the Museum buildings.

As a result of the results of Howell and collaborators, in the following years, extensive discussions took place on some conclusions related to human behavior, mainly those related to active hunting or the use of bone instruments. In order to establish a precise formation model of the deposits, the archaeologist Manuel Santonja and the geologist Alfredo Pérez-González proposed and co-directed a new stage of excavations, focused mainly to establish with precision the geology and the detailed stratigraphy of the same. The approach was based on the realization, prior to the systematic excavation, of trial pits and sections for detailed stratigraphic analysis, since simultaneous excavation in large areas could lead to confusion among very similar facies, mixing levels that should be differentiated with this other method. The works began in the years 1990 and 1991, with the elaboration of surface geological studies complemented with some soundings, and the main excavation campaigns were carried out, this time only in Ambrona, the summers from 1993 to 2000, without interruption, taking place some complementary sampling and other trials between 2001 and 2002.

The team had numerous specialists: Carmen Sesé and Enrique Soto (mammals), Paola Villa (taphonomy), Blanca Ruiz Zapata (palynology), Rafael Mora (area of Torralba, registry and cartography), Josep María Parés (paleomagnetism), Ángel Baltanás (ostracods), Ignacio Doadrio (fishes), Ascensión Pinilla (phytoliths), Borja Sanchiz (amphibians and reptiles), Antonio Sánchez Marco (birds), Juan M. Rodríguez de Tembleque, Joaquín Panera and Susana Rubio (archeology), Christophe Falguères (dating), Alfonso Benito Calvo (geology), C. Álvaro Chirveches, M. Vilà Margalef and Alexandra Vicent (consolidation and restoration). The excavations were carried out by a large number of archeology students, reaching over fifty in one of the campaigns.

In Ambrona a total of 688 m^{2} were excavated and some surveys and control tastings were carried out in Torralba. Some 975 lithic industry specimens were obtained, however, most paleontological remains were left unexploded, consolidated, covered again and protected to prevent spoilage and looting, in anticipation of a possible future extension of the museum exhibition in situ to a much larger extension of the site.

The works were followed by numerous publications, highlighting an extensive monographic volume of the magazine Zona Arqueológica (vol.5, 2005).

== Geology ==
The sediments in which the deposits are integrated correspond to ancient fluvium-Lake, Discordant deposits, by a soft local pale-relief, on the Triassic materials of the area (locally constituted by lutites and gypsums facies of type Keuper). They were located in the flat and impermeable bottom of an elongated valley from an ancient polje, then open and in the process of erosion.

=== Stratigraphy ===
The Ambrona site is located in the "Ambrona formation", whose sediment thickness, as a whole, would not exceed eight meters. Seven levels or litic facies have been identified, grouped into three members: one lower (AS1 to AS5 levels) – gravels, gray silts and clays, another medium (AS6) – sands and gray limes, and the upper one (AS7) – graves and red sands. The AS3 level (silt and clays) is locally eroded, supporting AS4 directly on AS2 at some points. The base, discordant, corresponds to facies of alluvial fans channel (AS1 and AS2). The AS3 level has been interpreted as lacustrine environment. The rest of the lower and middle members (AS4 to AS6) are interpreted as deposited in low-energy shallow fluvial-lacustrine environments, with some sediments of channel and overflow. The upper member (AS7), with a granulometry higher than the previous ones, corresponds again to alluvial fan facies, in which neither fossils nor lithic industry have been found.

The Torralba site, in turn, is integrated into the Torralba Formation. It would be more recent than Ambrona, formed at a later time, not determinable, of the encasement of the fluvial network in the valley, although Aguirre it supposes a probable temporary overlap between the superior members of Ambrona and the inferior ones of Torralba. The maximum recognized thickness of this formation is about 15 meters. In 1965, Butzer differentiated thirteen units in the stratigraphic column, grouped into two "complexes", both with fossils and lithic industry:

- Lower complex, of gray tones, characterized by gravels, sands and marls (IIa to IId, IIIa, IIIb, IVa and IVb units).
- Superior complex, of reddish colors, composed of sands, marls and gravels (Va to Vd units).

Above the Torralba Formation, the Sahuco Formation, of the Upper Pleistocene, absent in Ambrona, is superimposed.

=== Dating ===
Combining the methods of electron paramagnetic resonance (EPR) and uranium-thorium (U-Th), on the enamel and dentin of horse teeth, a dating has been obtained absolute not inferior to 350,000 years, contemporary of OSI 9 or final of OSI 11.

The studies of paleomagnetism have given in all Ambrona samples a normal polarity value, consistent with the cron Brunhes, the current one, which started 779 000 years ago .

== Paleontology ==
=== Systematics ===
The lists of taxa identified in the deposits have been changing over time, depending on the discovery of better diagnostic elements or the vagaries of the systematic; we try to present the most up-to-date relation.

==== Microorganisms ====
- Algae: diatoms (Amphora, Hantzschia, Surriella, Cyclotella, Anomoeoensis, Epithemia, Rhopalodia, Cocconeis, Pinnularia, Nitzschia), chrysophytes.

==== Vegetation ====
- Herbaceous: Poaceae, Asteraceae, Cichoriaceae, Fabaceae, Rumex, Plantago.
- Aquatic: Cyperaceae, Nymphaeaceae, Polygonum , Ranunculaceae, Typha.
- Shrubs: juniper (Juniperus), Rosaceae, Cistaceae, Ericaceae.
- Trees: pine (Pinus), alder (Alnus), willow (Salix), elm (Ulmus), oak (Quercus), birch (Betula), chestnut (Castanea), hazel (Corylus), walnut (Juglans).

==== Arthropods ====
- Ostracodes (Candona, Cypris, Cypridopsis, Eucypris, Herpetocypris, Heterocypris, Ilyocypris, Leucocythere, Plesiocyrpdopsis, Potamocypris).

==== Fishes, amphibians and reptiles ====
- Bermejuela (Chondrostoma arcasii)
- Common toad (Bufo bufo)
- Runner toad (Bufo calamita)
- Spanish painted frog (Discoglosus cf. jeanneae)
- European tree frog (Hyla arborea)
- Spanish spadefoot toad (Pelobates cultripes)
- Common parsley frog (Pelodytes punctatus)
- Perez's frog (Rana perezi)
- Lizard (Lacertidae indeterm.)
- Ladder snake (cf. Elaphe scalaris)
- Water snake (Natrix sp.)

==== Birds ====
- Greylag goose (Anser anser)
- Ruddy shelduck (Tadorna ferruginea)
- Northern pintail (Anas acuta)
- Gadwall (Anas strepera)
- Common merganser (Mergus merganser)
- Red-breasted merganser (Mergus serrator)
- Western swamphen (Porphyrio porphyrio)
- Eurasian coot (Fulica cf. atra)
- Northern lapwing (Vanellus vanellus)
- Great bustard (Otis tarda)

==== Soricomorphs, rodents and lagomorphs ====
- Musk shrews (Crocidura sp.)
- Topillo de las brechas (Microtus (Iberomys) brecciensis)
- Southwestern water vole (Arvicola aff. Sapidus)
- Wood mouse ( Apodemus aff. Sylvaticus )
- Rabbit (Oryctolagus sp.)

==== Carnivores ====
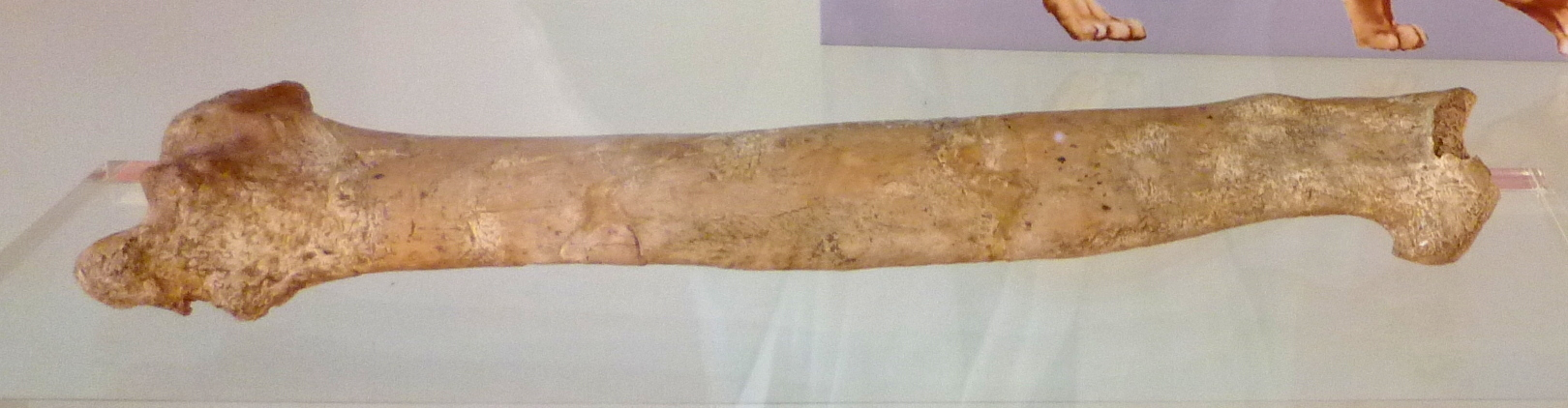
Radius of Panthera leo cf. fossilis of Ambrona.

- Early Middle Pleistocene European cave hyena (Crocuta crocuta aff. praespelaea)
- Early Middle Pleistocene European cave lion (Panthera leo cf. fossilis)
- Fox (Vulpes sp.)
- Mosbach's wolf (Canis lupus cf. mosbachensis)

==== Proboscides, perissodactyla and artiodactyla ====
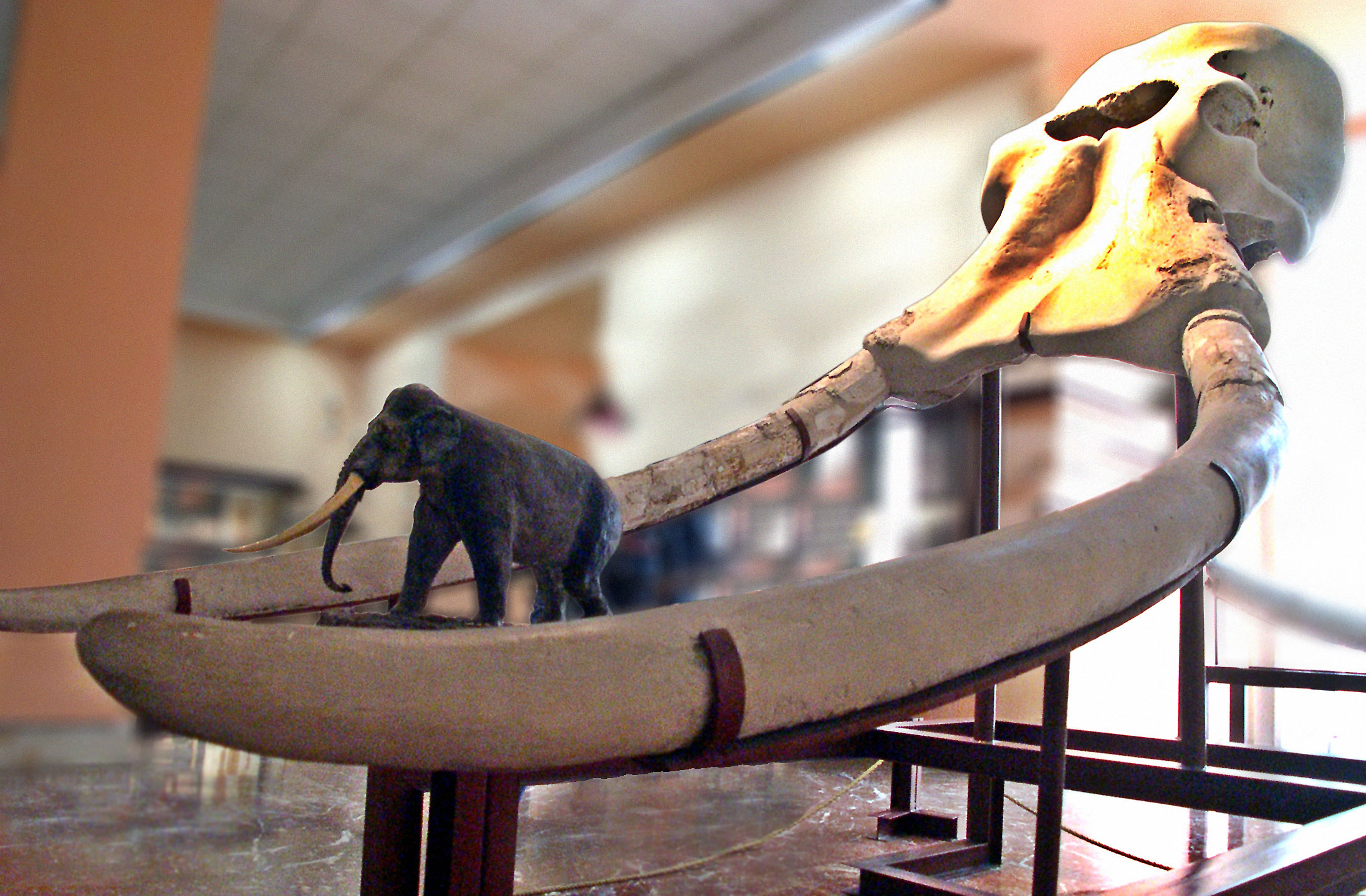
Skull and tusks of Palaeoloxodon antiquus of Ambrona.

- Ancient elephant with a septated nose (Palaeoloxodon antiquus platyrhynchus)
- Rhinoceros with a septated nose (Stephanorhinus hemitoechus)
- Torralba's horse (Equus caballus torralbae)
- European red deer (Cervus elaphus)
- Fallow deer (Dama cf. dama)
- Roe Deer (Capreolus sp.)
- Great-horned deer (Megaloceros aff. Savini)
- Ancient bull (Bos antiquus) or primitive bull (Bos primigenius)

==== Primates ====
- Heidelberg's man? (? Homo heidelbergensis). Without skeletal remains in the sites, human presence is identified by the lithic industry and the activity marks on elephant bones. The species is inferred only by correlation with the Sima de los Huesos site of Atapuerca, of similar age.

=== Paleoecology ===
The vegetation, identified by the pollen at different levels, shows the evolution of the paleoenvironment during the sedimentation of the same, which in general corresponds to fluvio-lacustrine media under a temperate climate, softer and more humid than the current one. For the lower sections of the sequence (AS1 to AS5) an initial environment is inferred with grasses, riparian trees (alder, willow and elm) and few pines, after which an environment of moorland with junipers, alternating, with an increase towards the end, with pine forests. The AS6 level is characterized by the almost exclusive domain of the pine forests, but on the roof, the return of the moorlands is finally reflected with junipers and grasses (Poaceae).

The diatoms indicate that during the sedimentation of the AS4 and AS5 units the salinity increased in the lagoon and that the water layer was somewhat higher with respect to the previous units -the salts would be contributed by the sediments of the underwater Keuper facies that surround all area-. For the AS6 unit they show that a medium-high salinity is maintained, but with a lower water layer, decreasing until disappearing towards the roof of the unit.

The ostracod Leucocythere mirabilis, present throughout the sequence (AS1 to AS6), indicates oligotrophic water conditions. On the other hand, the salinity of the waters could not be very high, as indicated by the presence of certain ostracods.

The set of frogs indicates a more benign environment than the current one, with less dry summers and less cold winters. The age (stage of ontogenetic development) of some specimens indicates that death occurred between March and summer, most likely in the spring.

The bermejuela, the only fish found in these sites, indicates a small fluvial course or lagoon not very extensive.

Some of the birds found are typical of lacustrine areas with thick marginal vegetation, but no remains of any diving species have appeared, indicating that the lagoon would be shallow, of shallow depth.

Mammals indicate forest environments (Cervus, Dama, Capreolus) and open areas with meadows (Microtus brecciensis, Palaeoloxodon, Stephanorhinus, Bos, Dama, Capreolus), with areas of abundant water (Arvicola, Palaeoloxodon) and more temperate and humid climate than the current one.

=== Biochronology ===
Some Pleistocene mammals may provide some biochronologic resolution, and those represented in Torralba and Ambrona have the association and characteristics typical of mid-Middle Pleistocene, between 400 000 and 300 of Ionian age, which lasted from 781 000 to 126 000 years before the present). The most characteristic temporal marker is the Arvicolinae Microtus (I.) brecciensis, which in Ambrona presents some primitive characters, as does Palaeoloxodon antiquus and Bos primigenius, prior to populations recorded in late-Middle Pleistocene sites. On the other hand, Arvicola aff. sapidus, from Ambrona, presents traits that indicate an age after the beginning of the Middle Pleistocene, coinciding with what is indicated by the presence of Palaeoloxodon.

Other sites, with a similar faunal association of mammals or the evolutionary status of the significant species, are those of Áridos (Arganda del Rey) and some terraces of the Manzanares River (Madrid), Pinedo (Toledo), El Higuerón (Rincón de la Victoria, Province of Málaga) or Solana del Zamborino (Fonelas, Province of Granada).

=== Taphonomy ===
The bone remains of large mammals are, in general, dispersed, eroded and fragmented, evidencing trawling by fluvial transport, although in clay or silty sediments there are usually elements in anatomical connection, with little or no transport (primary accumulation), and without predators or scavengers, even the skeleton of an elephant specimen (in the so-called "α" concentration) is practically complete. On the other hand, there is evidence of human manipulation in some elephant bones: certain fractures and cut marks by lytic instruments for dying.

The abundant accumulations of elephant remains in Ambrona are similar to the modern sites popularly known as "Elephants' graveyards". In these places, close to water sources, corpses tend to accumulate, mainly elephants, but also other mammals, and have been well studied in African parks. In this environment trampling and fragmentation of exposed or semi-buried remains by elephants or other mammals occurs, which continue to go to the water sources. In Ambrona, the elephant mortality curve also fits into this model, seems to indicate deaths due to natural causes and does not present the typical bias due to selective hunting.

From the excavations of Howell in Ambrona, the alignment of a defense and five long elephant bones of difficult interpretation have been described and in which it has been wanted to see, without any justification, some type of ritual.

Elephants are the most represented mammals in all the fossiliferous levels, except in the AS6 levels of Ambrona (middle member), in which only horse remains appear, and Va de Torralba (upper complex), in which the horse is clearly predominant over the rest.

== Archeology ==
=== Lithic industry ===
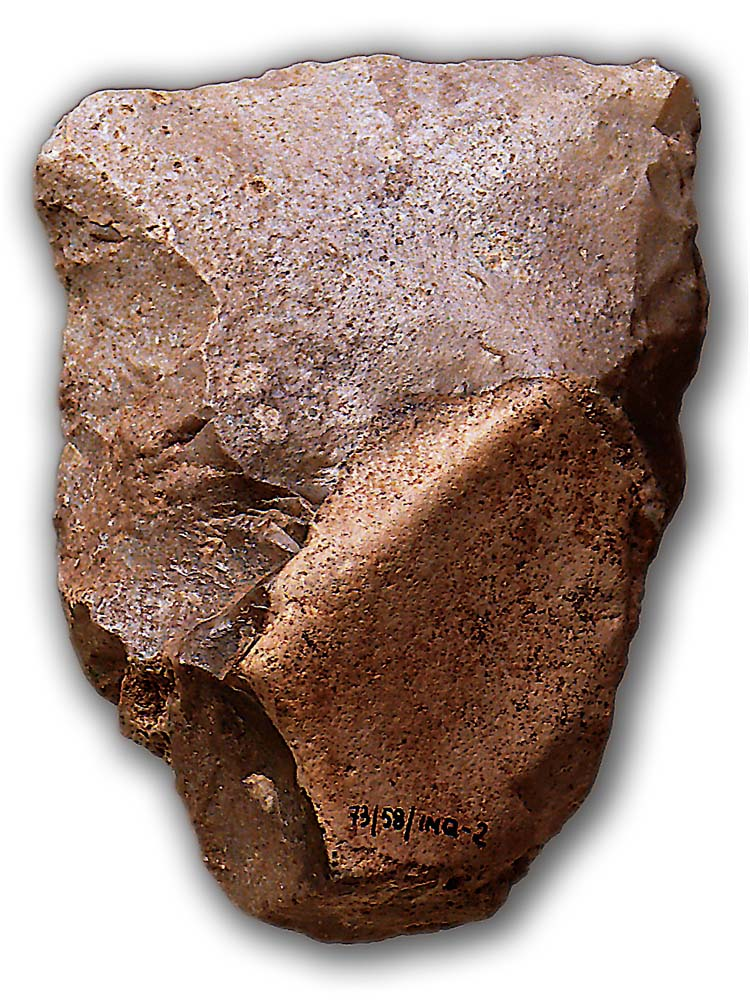
Cleaver of Torralba.

The lithic industry recovered from these sites has been very numerous, although in relation to the excavated volumes it can be considered scarce. It corresponds to the late Acheulean primitive or middle-ancient Acheulian, dated in the «full» Middle Pleistocene.

The typology is diverse: hand axes, cleavers, racloirs, denticulates, perforators, back knife or burins, among others. The materials are very varied: flint, quartzite, limestone and quartz, from different origins, some transported from long distances (flint and quartzite) and others taking advantage of those available in the area (limestone and quartz).

Between 20% and 65% of the pieces, according to the levels, they seem not to be eroded, while the rest show signs of light bearing, secondary accumulation, with few elements very rolled. There is no evidence of in situ manufacture, only of secondary retouching, and mainly on quartzite elements.

=== Bone industry ===
The existence or not of bone industry from bones and elephant defenses in these sites is very controversial.

On the one hand, Villa and collaborators, based on the taphonomic analysis of the types of breaks and superficial alterations of the bones deny the existence of bone industry, at least for the Ambrona site, leaving Torralba with indetermination. In the deposits, more than fifty tips of young elephant tusks have been collected, after almost a century of excavations, which these authors interpret as a result of the natural break during the activity of the animals in the barking of trees or the digging of the ground looking for water, as is the case with today's elephants.

On the other hand, Aguirre, among others, maintains that it is very probable a certain rudimentary industry of trihedral and other bone elements endowed with points and edges. Likewise, Aguirre interprets the tips of ivory of defenses as possible soft hammerstones, selected and purposely prepared by man for use in lithic carving. These affirmations are based on direct experimentation with current elephant bones and comparing the results with the breaking and polishing marks of some bone elements of the sites, with sharpness and with the percussion polishing marks at the tips of the defenses, as well as in the relative abundance of these last ones against complete defenses.

== Paleontological Museum ==
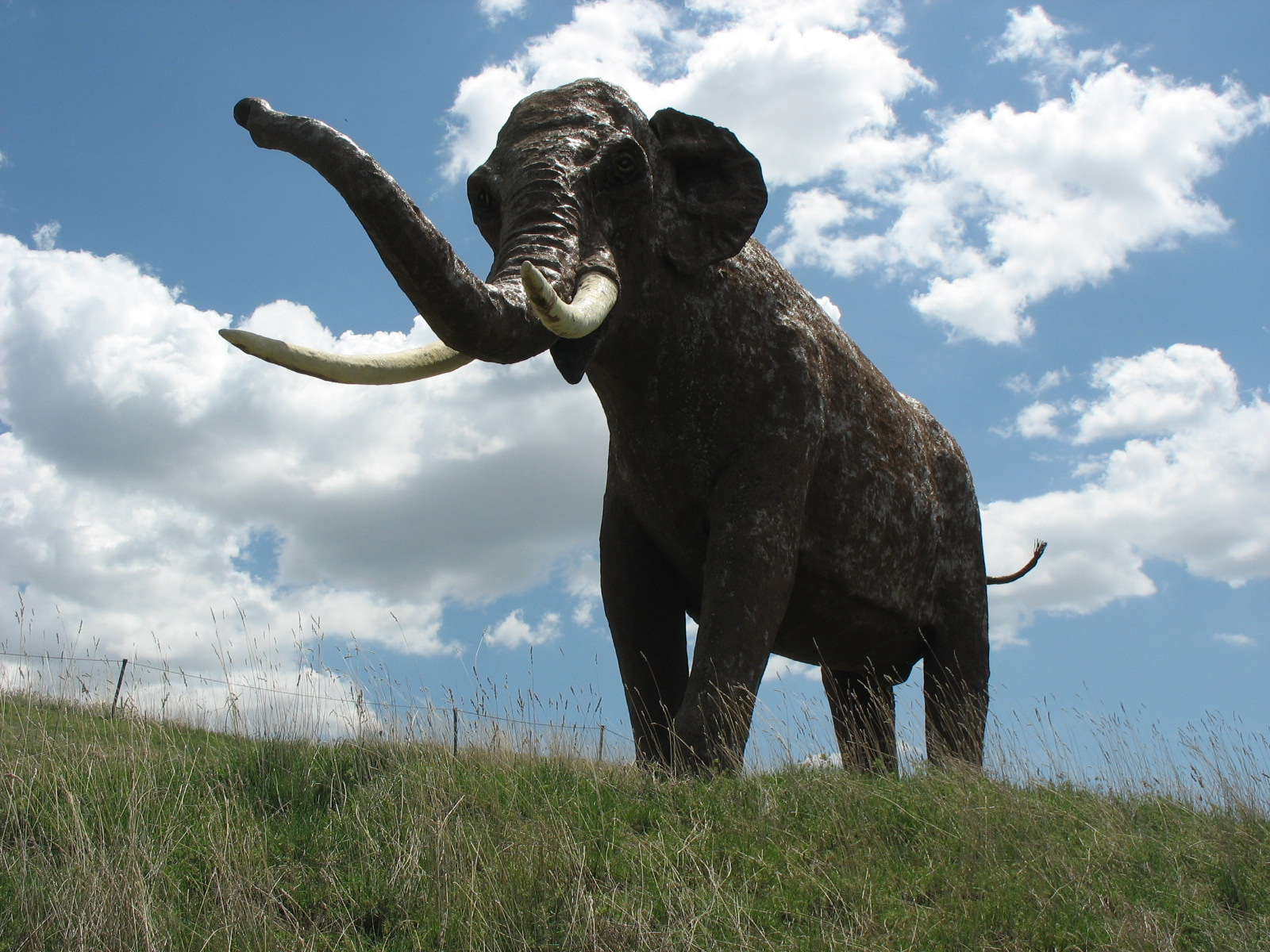
Life-size recreation of Straight-tusked elephant next to the museum.

There is a small museum in Ambrona, the Museo de Ambrona. It is currently managed as an off-shoot of the Numantine Museum of Soria. Built directly on the site, it shows, in situ, part of the material as it was found.

It was devised by Aguirre in 1963, for which Howell reserved an area of the excavations from which the fossils found were not extracted. Aguirre and Echaide designed the project, which was completed in November of the same year. It was the first museum of its kind to be opened in Spain. Ten years later Aguirre obtained, in addition, that a road was made that facilitated a route of cultural tourism between the Nacional II, the museum and Sigüenza. In 1985, laboratories and a public exhibition room were built, showing material that was deposited in other museums.

Subsequently, the unrealistic figure of a straight-tusked elephant at its natural size was incorporated into the exterior of the museum.

== Other exhibitions ==
- In addition to the aforementioned Museo aqueológico de Ambrona, material from these sites are housed and exhibited in
- the Museo Nacional de Ciencias Naturales
- the National Archaeological Museum of Spain
- the Regional Archaeological Museum of the Community of Madrid
