= Uxama Argaela =

Coordinates: 41.575°N 3.094°W

Uxama Argaela was a Celtiberian, and subsequently Roman, city located on El Castro hill, overlooking the present town of El Burgo de Osma in Soria, Spain.

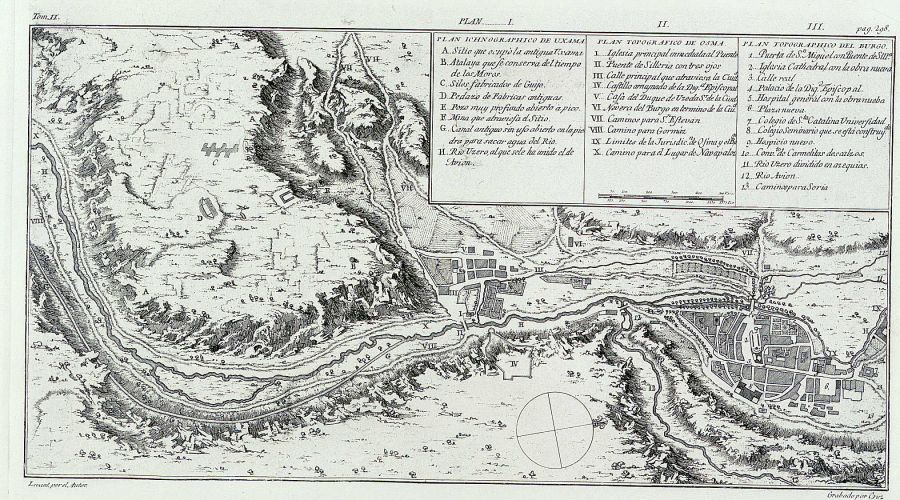
Topography of Uxama

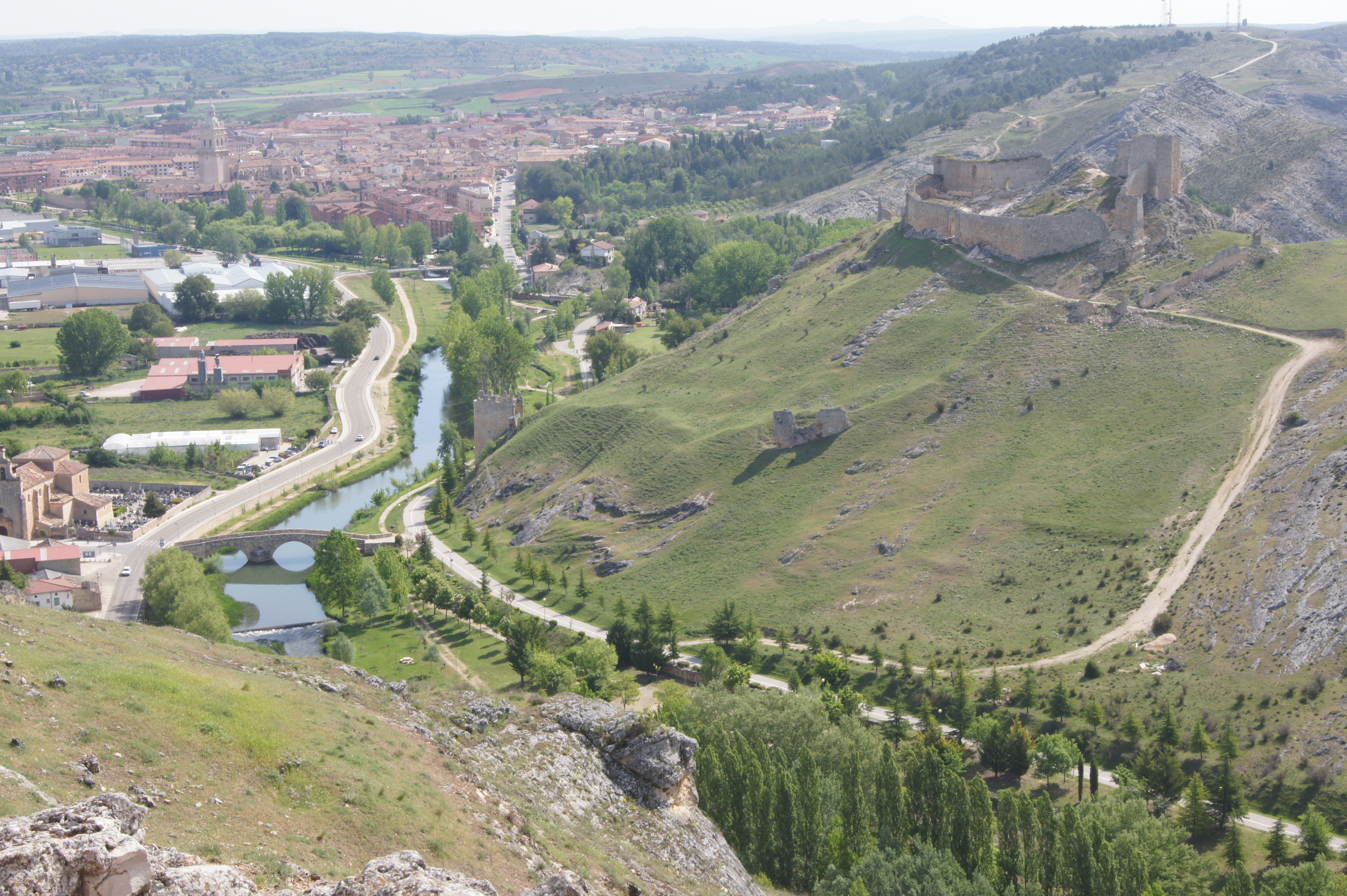
Uxama view

== History ==
As one of the cities of the Arevaci, it actively participated in the Celtiberian Wars (153–133 BC) and was conquered by Rome in 99 BC. Later, it supported the cause of the Roman rebel Quintus Sertorius against Rome, and was destroyed by Pompey the Great in 72 BC, although it was rebuilt shortly afterwards.

According to Pliny and Ptolemy, it was one of the communities of the Conventus Iuridicus Cluniensis province in Hispania Tarraconensis and became a Municipium under Tiberius, after which began an important monumentalisation process that involved the construction of a small forum, a series of large urban villas, city walls, and an industrial district on the banks of the river Ucero.

In time of the Visigoths in the 6th century, the bishops attended the Councils of Toledo.

== Present site ==
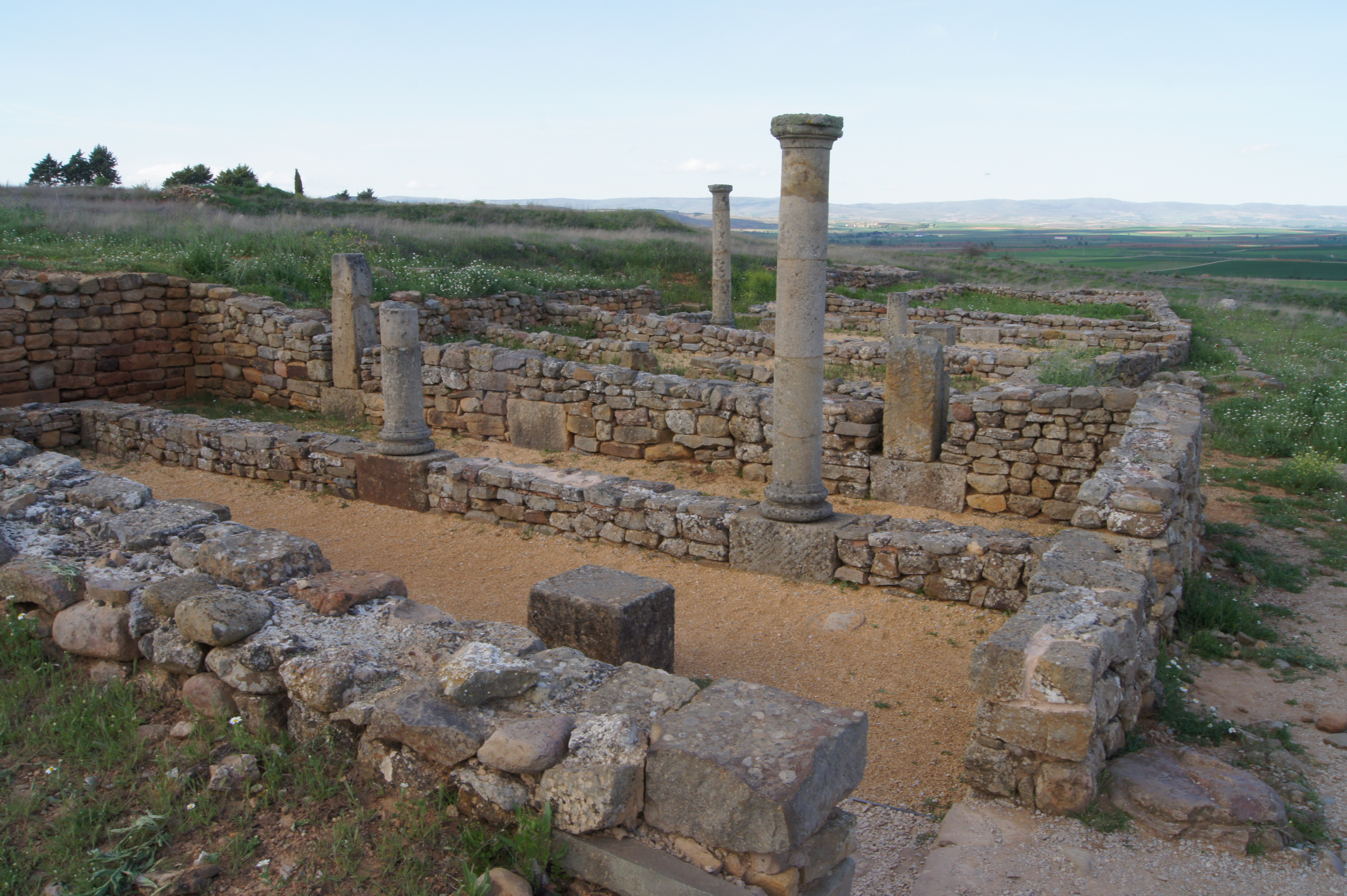
Uxama villa

The city covers two plateaus with an area of 28 ha. The walls, protected by rectangular towers, can be seen to the north east and south of the city. The most important monuments are the Mina (section of a drain), cisterns, baths, and a basilica with mosaics. In the Portugui vineyards part of an extensive Celtiberian cemetery has been excavated, with incineration graves of the 3rd-2nd century BC.

Sections of the aqueduct can be seen cut into tunnels in the solid rock on the edge of the ancient city.

=== Finds ===
Every year a season of summer excavations is done in conjunction with the site of Tiermes.

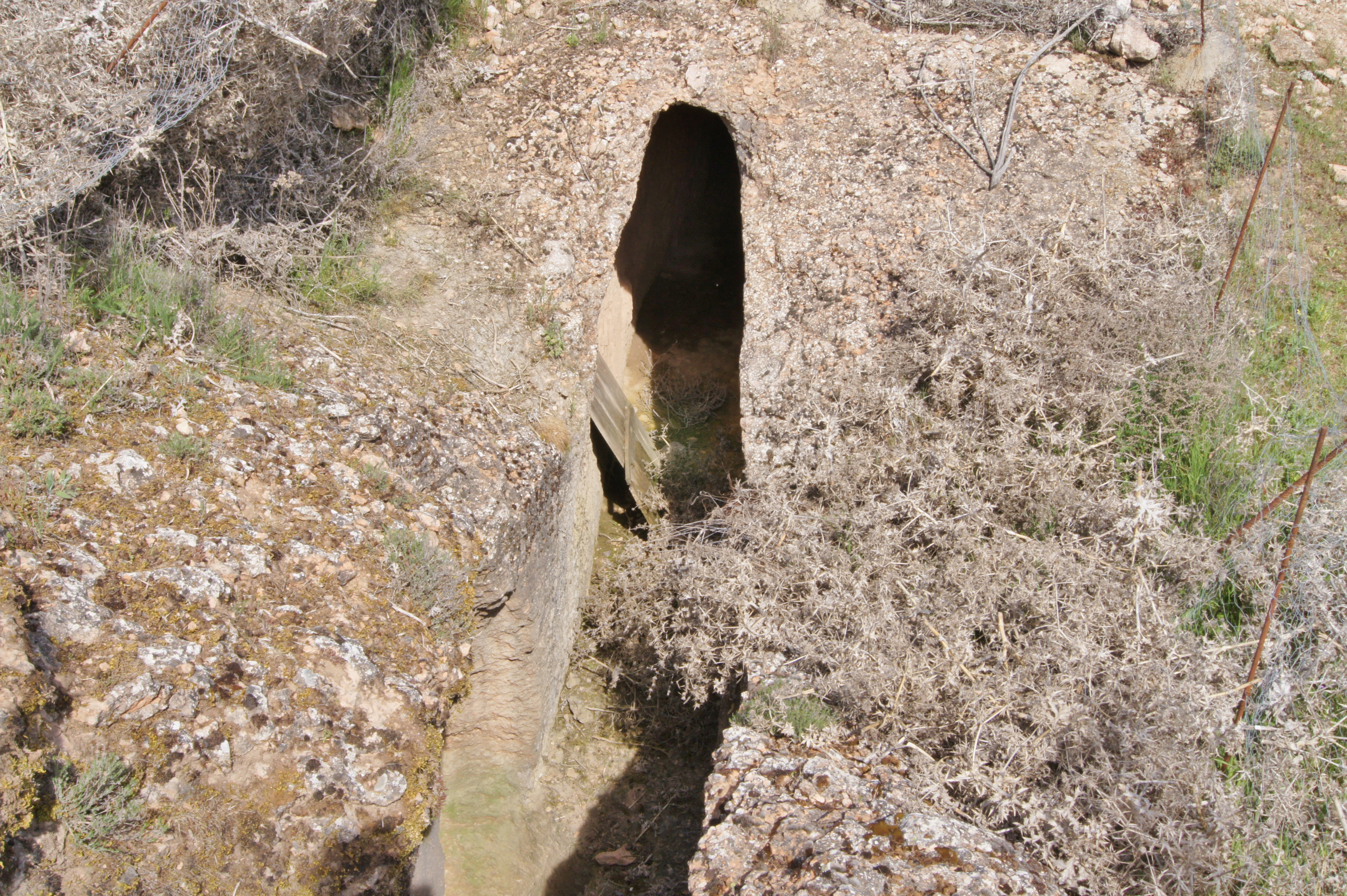
Uxama aqueduct

There is also a modest museum, open only in the summer months, about 2 kilometers from the old fort along the N-122.

Finds are numerous and significant, and are displayed in the National Archaeological Museum in Madrid, the Numantine Museum in Soria and the National Army Museum in Toledo. They include sculptures, Roman capitals, iron weapons, including inscriptions, republican and imperial coins, ceramics, glass objects, and a set of horse bronzes.
