= Tiermes =

Tiermes may refer to:

- Tiermes, the present-day Termantia archaeological site, on the edge of the Duero valley in Spain
- Horagalles, often equated with Tiermes, the thunder god in Sami shamanism
