= Numantine Museum of Soria =

Coordinates: 41°45′51.72″N 2°28′13.92″W

The Numantine Museum of Soria
- Museo Numantino de Soria
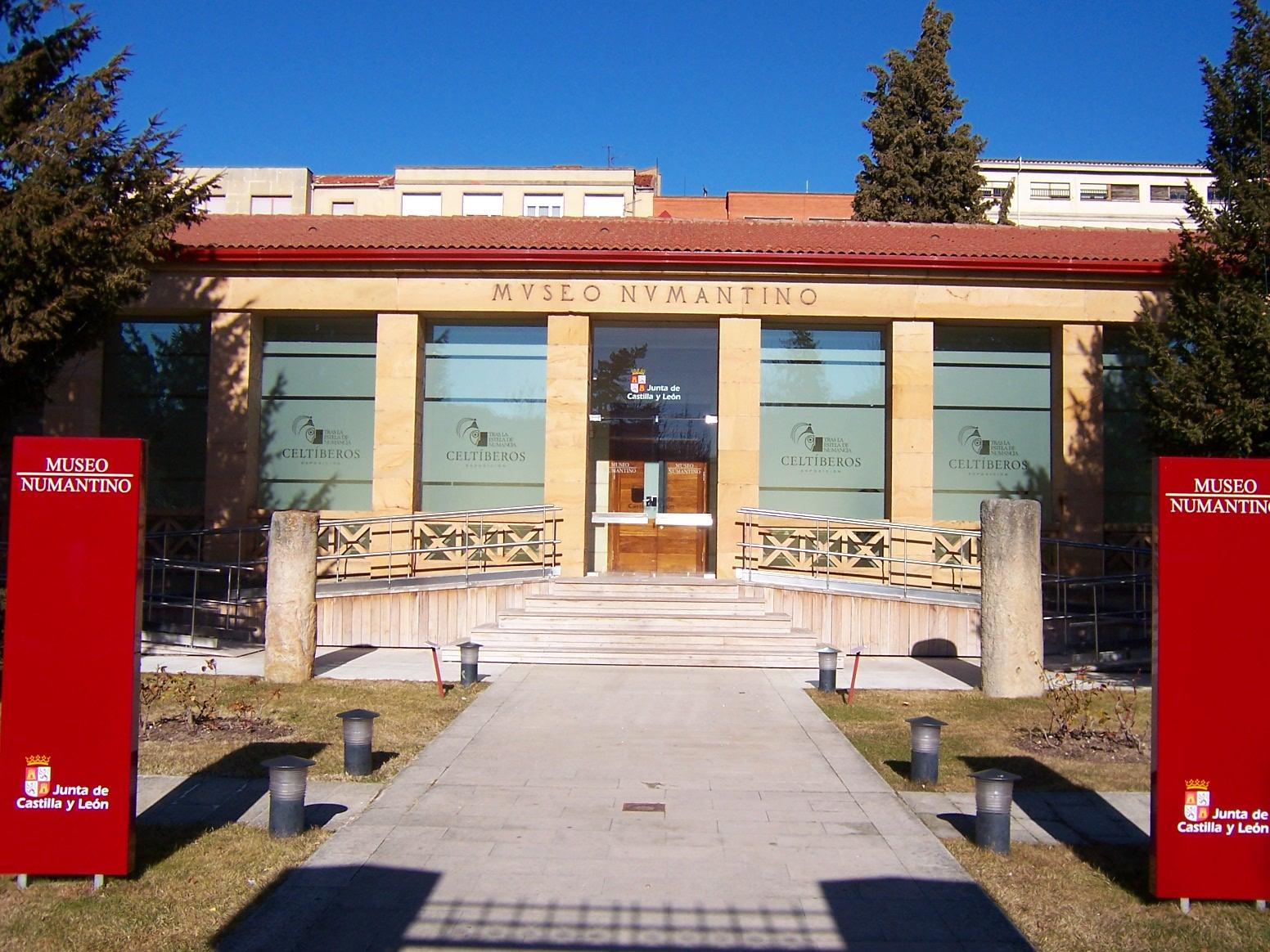
- Established: 1919
- Location: Soria, Spain
- Visitors: 330.030 (2009)
- Director: Elías Terés Navarro

The Numantine Museum of Soria, located in Soria, Spain, focuses on the prehistory and history of the province of Soria through art and archaeology. The name of the museum, which means "pertaining to Numantia," reflects the historical importance of Spain's most famous hill fort, located just a few kilometers from Soria.

The museum is the center of a network of smaller museums in the province, such as the Museo Paleontológico de Ambrona.

The museum's displays feature a significant amount of material from Numantia, but they say relatively little about its siege by the Romans, which was a significant event in Spanish history. The siege is commemorated at the site itself. The museum also showcases material related to other Iron Age settlements in the province, notably Tiermes and Uxama, complementing smaller on-site museums.

== History ==
The museum was the result of a 1919 merger of two museums in Soria: the Provincial Museum, founded in the 19th century and inaugurated in 1913, and the Museo Numantino, which developed from the study of the archaeological site of Numantia. The study of Numantia began in the 19th century and gained importance from 1906 to 1923.

The museum building was designed by Manuel Aníbal Álvarez and funded by Ramón Benito Aceña. It was constructed on land donated by the local council and inaugurated on 18 September 1919 by King Alfonso XIII.

In 1932, the Museo Provincial changed its name to Museo Celtibérico. In 1941, the two museums united but maintained their independence until 1968. The integrated museums were initially called Museo Provincial de Soria, then Museo de Soria, and finally Museo Numantino. In 1989, the museum underwent a complete renovation, expanding its exhibition space to 7.000 m^{2}.

== Building ==
The original building was a single storey with three wings dividing two courtyards. The wings remain, but in the 1980s, the main block was expanded to three floors.

Conceived in chronological order, the visitor's route begins in the Lower Paleolithic. From the Bronze Age, notable items include weapons and tombstones, while from the Iron Age, there are ceramic vessels from the castros, or hill forts. From the Celtiberian period, the collection includes pottery, brooches, pectorals, weapons, and tools from the fields of Numancia, Uxama, Tiermes, and other sites in the province. From the Roman period, objects found in villages and cemeteries are displayed. The route concludes with the Middle Ages, represented by preserved architectural ruins, pottery, and coins.

=== Adaptations for people with disabilities ===
The route is accessible to blind and partially sighted individuals. With this in mind, a number of pieces and reproductions are available for tactile interaction.

== Collections ==
=== Stone Age ===
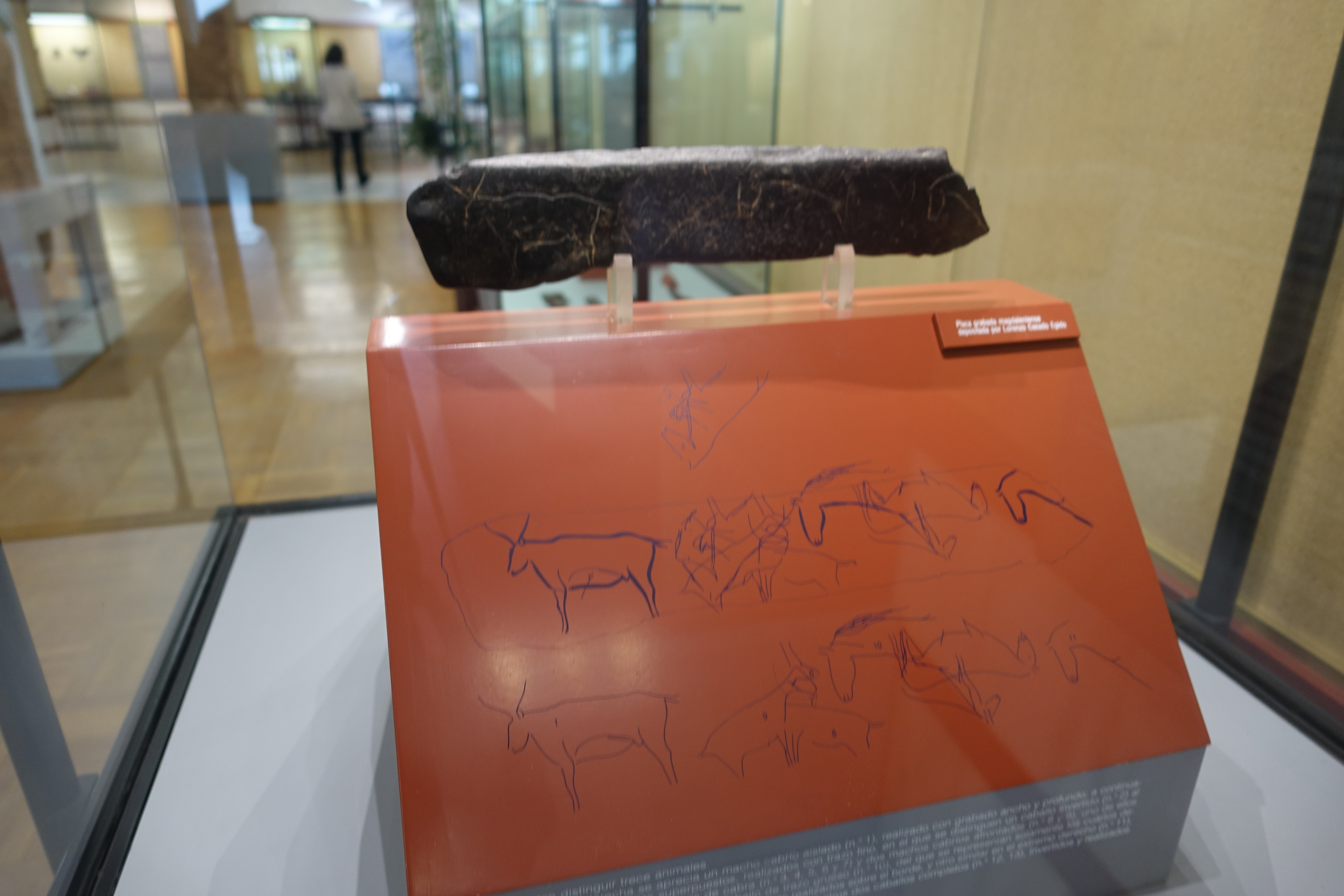
Fauna on the slate plaque known as the Placa de Villalba

Human remains from Palaeolithic Soria are scarce, but there are impressive remains of a prey species, Palaeoloxodon antiquus, from the Torralba and Ambrona sites, where the animals were butchered about 400,000 years ago. The displays also highlight the Solutrean piece known as the Placa de Villalba. Discovered in the 1980s, this piece represents Palaeolithic fauna. The deposits in the southwest of the province yield numerous Neolithic objects.

=== Copper and Bronze Ages ===
The Bell Beaker culture from the Chalcolithic and the Bronze Age are also represented by pieces from the Covelda deposit and the Villar del Alba menhir.

=== Iron Age ===
The Iron Age is represented through finds from several sites, notably Numantia, Tiermes, and Uxama. This period occupies the exhibition halls on the upper floors, which make up the Celtiberian Section. The Celtibérica exhibition is also organized chronologically and divided into three periods: early, middle, and late, with numerous pieces from each. Notable items include a remarkable funerary pediment with swords and antennas, brooches, pectorals, spiral plates, and funerary urns. The ceramic collection is also particularly significant.

=== Roman period and later ===
The Roman occupation was significant due to its social and political changes. The museum displays findings from the sites of Cuevas de Soria, Santervás del Burgo, and Quintanares de Rioseco, with particular emphasis on those found at Numantia.

There is a Visigothic collection from sites that were consolidated as the towns of Numancia, Osma, and Tiermes.

There are important Muslim pieces reflecting the strong Muslim presence in the province, where they established the Marca Media, with its capital in Medinaceli. After the Muslim departure, the Christian repopulation introduced Romanesque and Gothic art.
