= Francis Clark Howell =

American anthropologist (1925–2007)

- Born: November 27, 1925; Kansas City, Missouri
- Died: March 10, 2007 (aged 81); Berkeley, California
- Other name: F. Clark Howell
- Citizenship: United States
- Education: University of Chicago
- Known for: Human evolutionary development in Africa (Ethiopia, Tanzania), Asia (Turkey), Europe (Spain)
- Awards: Leakey Prize (LSB Leakey Foundation); Darwin Award; Fellows' Medal; Member of National Academy of Science (USA); French and British science academies
- Scientific career
- Fields: Physical Anthropology, Archeology, Paleontology
- Workplaces: University of Chicago; University of California at Berkeley

Francis Clark Howell (November 27, 1925 – March 10, 2007), generally known as F. Clark Howell, was an American anthropologist.

Born in Kansas City, Missouri, F. Clark Howell grew up in Kansas, where he became interested in natural history. He served in the U.S. Navy during World War II, from 1944 to 1946 in the Pacific Theater. Howell was educated at the University of Chicago, where he received his Ph.B., A.M. and Ph.D. degrees under the tutelage of Sherwood L. Washburn.

Howell died of metastatic lung cancer on March 10, 2007, at age 81 at his home in Berkeley, California.

== Academic career ==
Howell began his career in the Anatomy Department of Washington University in St. Louis in 1953, and stayed there for only two years before moving back to his alma mater, the University of Chicago. He went on to spend the next 25 years of his career there in the Department of Anthropology. He achieved a professorship in 1962 and became chairman of the department in 1966. In 1970, Howell moved to the University of California, Berkeley following his mentor Washburn. This time he stayed for good, remaining a professor and then an emeritus until his death.

Howell's early work focused on Homo neanderthalensis for which he made trips to Europe beginning in 1953. His later work brought him to Africa, the cradle of mankind. From 1957 to 1958 he worked at Isimila, Tanzania, where he recovered enormous hand-axes dating from the Acheulean (260,000 years old). Continuing his study of the Acheulean period he excavated in Spain (1961 to 1963) at the sites of Torralba and Ambrona which are 300,000 to 400,000 years old. At none of these sites did he find skeletal material however. That had to wait until he worked on lower Pleistocene deposits dating from 2.1 - 0.1 Mya in the Omo River region of southern Ethiopia. There he found vertebrate fossils of monkeys as well as hominids. It was here that he also pioneered new dating methods based on potassium-argon radioisotope techniques.

== Other interests ==
Howell was a proponent for scientific research of all kinds and strongly believed in popularizing science. He demonstrated this through many of his non-academic interests and efforts.

Howell was instrumental in the creation of the L.S.B. Leakey Foundation. Subsequently, he served the Foundation as Science Advisor, Chairman of the Science and Grants committee, and then trustee until his death. Howell also played significant roles in several other evolution and natural sciences organizations including the Stone Age Institute in Bloomington IN, the Berkeley Geochronology Center (BGC), the Institute for Human Origins ('IHO'), the Wenner-Gren Foundation, the National Center for Science Education ('NCSE') and the Human Evolution Research Center ('HERC') at the University of California at Berkeley, which he co-managed for over thirty years with his colleague Tim D. White. Howell was also a science advisor and later president, trustee and fellow of the California Academy of Sciences.

Since 2013, Howell has been listed on the Advisory Council of the National Center for Science Education.

At various times, Howell served on the editorial boards of Encyclopædia Britannica, World Book/Childcraft and Science Year, National Geographic and Time-Life Books (now part of Time Warner).

Finally, Howell wrote a popular mainstream book on human evolution, Early Man, which was published in 1965 as part of the Time-Life's LIFE Nature Library series (see March of Progress (illustration)).

In February 2007 one month before his death he sat down for interviews totaling 8 hours with Samuel Redman of the Bancroft Library's Oral History Center.

== Honors ==
Howell was a member of the United States' National Academy of Sciences, the American Academy of Arts and Sciences, and the American Philosophical Society. He was also a member or fellow of the science institutes and academies of France, Britain and South Africa. He received the Charles Darwin Award for lifetime achievement from the American Association of Physical Anthropologists and the Leakey Prize in 1998 from the L.S.B. Leakey Foundation. The California Academy of Sciences awarded him its Fellows Medal in 1990.

At least seven extinct species are named for him. The species name howelli designates two mollusks, two ancestral species of civet cats, one hyena, an ancestral antelope and a primate of the loris family.

== Writings ==
In addition to Early Man, a volume of the Life Nature Library, Howell wrote more than 200 scientific papers and reviews.

- Chapter on Hominidae in Evolution of African Mammals, edited by Vincent Maglio and Basil Cooke (1978).
