= Termantia =

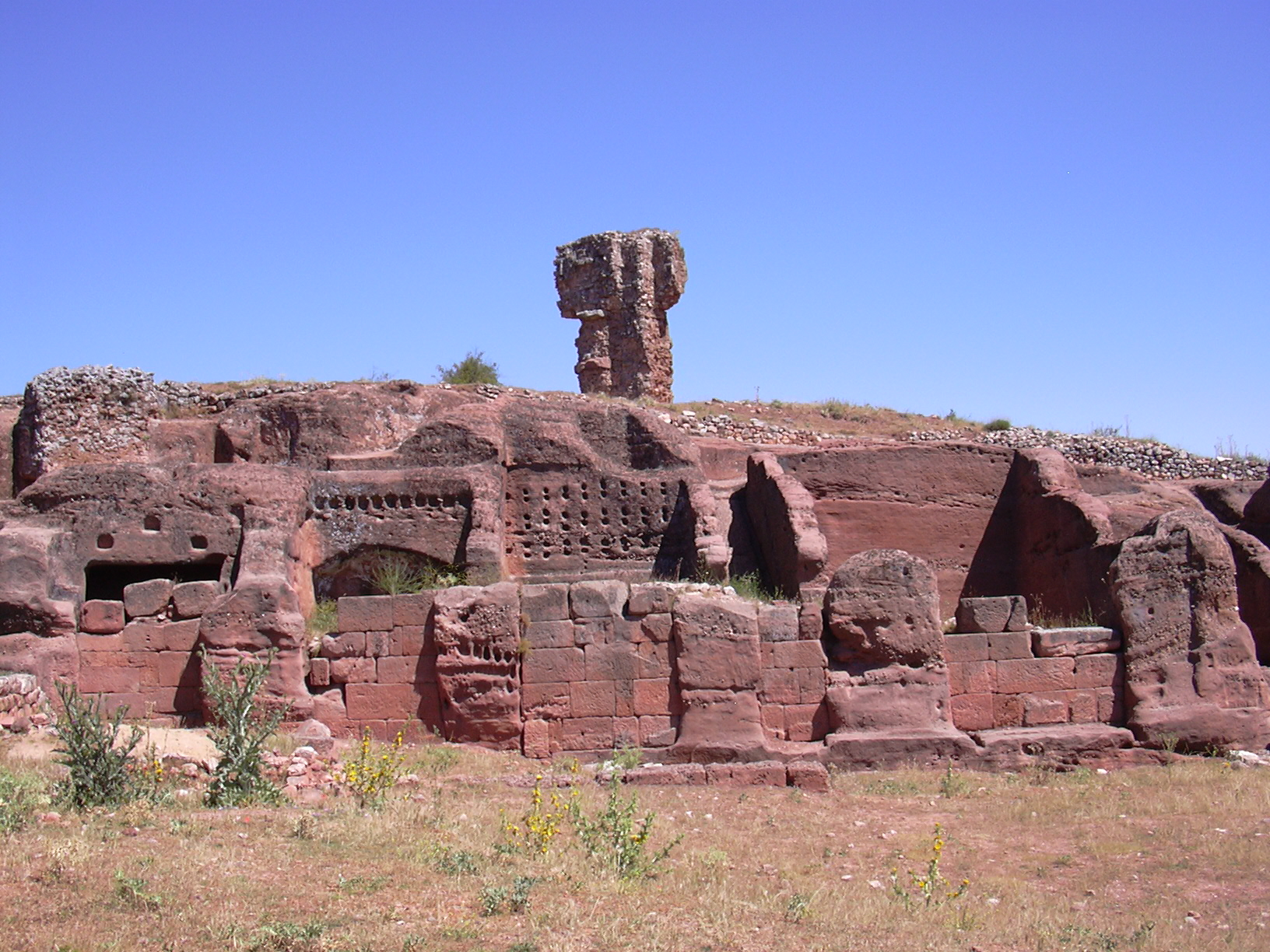
- Ancient rock-cut houses
- Interactive map of Termantia
- 41°19′51″N 3°08′56″W
- Type: Municipium
- Associated with: Celtiberians, Romans
- Location: Montejo de Tiermes, Soria
- Region: Iberian Peninsula

History
- Built: Bronze Age
- Abandoned: 16th century

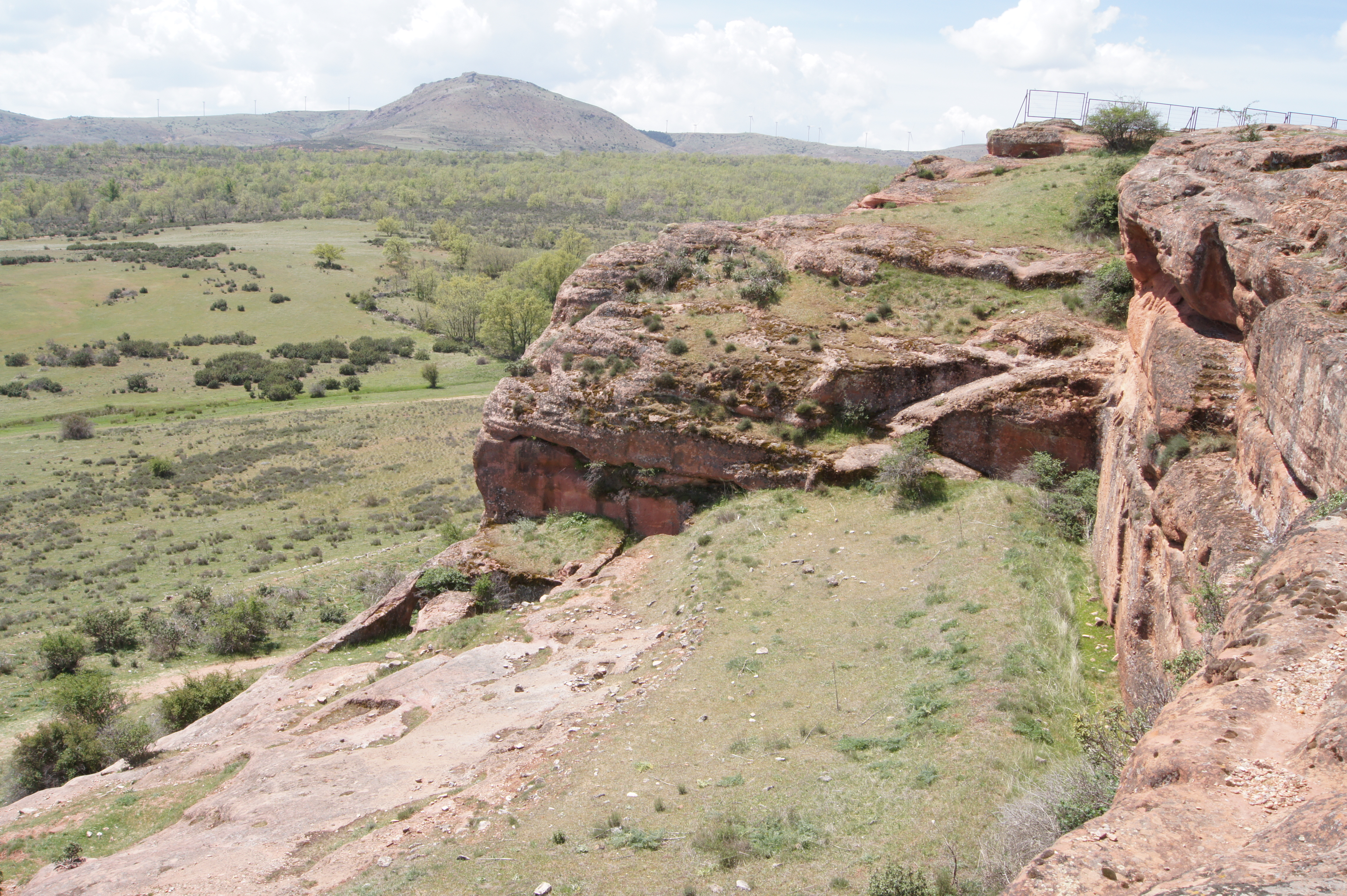
View of rock-cut houses and surroundings

Termantia, the present-day locality of Tiermes, is an archaeological site on the edge of the Duero valley in Spain. It is located in the sparsely populated municipio of Montejo de Tiermes (Soria, Castile and León).

During the Iron Age it was a Celtiberian hill fort. It resisted the Romans, and was allied to Numantia during the Celtiberian Wars. It is believed that the Romans gave it the status of municipium. The original name was Romanised as Termes or Termantia. It is remarkable for its impressive site on an arid red sandstone hill and for the way buildings have been carved in the solid rock.

== Roman history ==
The wealth of Termes in Celtiberian and Roman times came possibly from sheep farming (there are indications of an annual transfer of flocks between the northern plateau and Extremadura) and from deposits of iron ore and other metals in their area of influence.

The conquest of the Iberian Peninsula by Rome was a long process that lasted two centuries. One of the highlights was the Celtiberian Wars that led to the incorporation of much of Celtiberia up to the middle of the upper Duero after the fall of Numantia in 133 BC. During this phase Termes was attacked by the Roman consul Q. Pompey in 141 BC, who signed a treaty with Termes in 139 BC, along with Numantia. The treaty was overruled by the Roman Senate, though continued hostilities did not directly affect Termes. Finally, at the end of the 2nd century BC, Rome restarted the conquest beyond Numantia; Termes fell in 98 BC, after the assault of the consul Titus Didius, who forced the inhabitants to move down to the plain, which according to archaeological data lasted only one or two decades. Afterwards Termes paid tribute (civitas stipendaria), beginning a slow process of Romanisation.

From 70 BC the city began major urban renewal, using the three terraces of the hill, especially the middle, where the most important buildings would be located in the future.

The city was probably given the title Municipium during the reign of Emperor Tiberius. Termes was assigned to the Conventus Cluniensis and thereafter the Hispanic-Roman city began to take shape, whose period of greatest splendour was between the first and second centuries AD. It was endowed with large public buildings, two fora (first Julio-Claudian and later a Flavian forum), thermal baths, a possible theatre, an aqueduct and urban development suited to the location of the city on a sandstone bluff surrounded by river gorges and forests.

A particular characteristic of Termes, and most spectacular today, is the technique of carving buildings into the solid rock, later perfected with the introduction of Roman construction techniques. The city has numerous remains of buildings with this type of architecture, both private buildings (House of the Niches, Aqueduct House ...) and public (rock bleachers, Theatre, ...) and infrastructure (urban channels aqueduct, drainage, pathways, ...).

The construction of the wall in the late third century AD indicates that the city maintained its character which lasted at least until the middle of IVth c. AD. Termes faded during late antiquity.

== Post-Roman history ==
Very little of what happened in the city during the Visigoth and Islamic periods is known. There is a Romanesque church, which as the area is now depopulated has the status of eremita (hermitage).

== Archaeology ==
The archaeological remains are located on several terraces and in the southern plain:

Flight of steps carved into the rock: monumental public space of uncertain date and function, with steps divided into sectors and access stairways, near the door of the Sun, one of the ancient entrances. Southern rock complex: the remains of homes probably originating Celtiberian era, carved into the rocks on two floors, in the back, and with masonry facade of the Roman era. There are 11 houses divided into two zones, separated by a staircase. The "house of the Niches", among them, also shows an upper floor. Canal aqueduct: carved into the rock, it brought water from the hill to the Roman city, partly underground West Gate: pedestrian access to the city "House of the aqueduct", residence of 1800 sqm with 35 rooms on different levels connected by stairs. The foundation was cut into the hill, while the walls were plastered and decorated with murals. Forum with a temple dedicated to the imperial cult, arcaded square and a macellum with taverns.

In 2018 geophysical surveying (Magnetometry) allowed the identification of new housing-areas within the city walls as well as previously unknown structures outside the (supposed) boundaries of the city, specifically in the extreme west and extreme east of the hill. In the case of the western structures these are thought to be earlier than the Roman city of Termantia/Termes, i.e. part of the Iron Age hilltop settlement. The eastern structures are without fixed chronology and could be part of a previously unknown extension of the Roman settlement.

=== Gallery ===
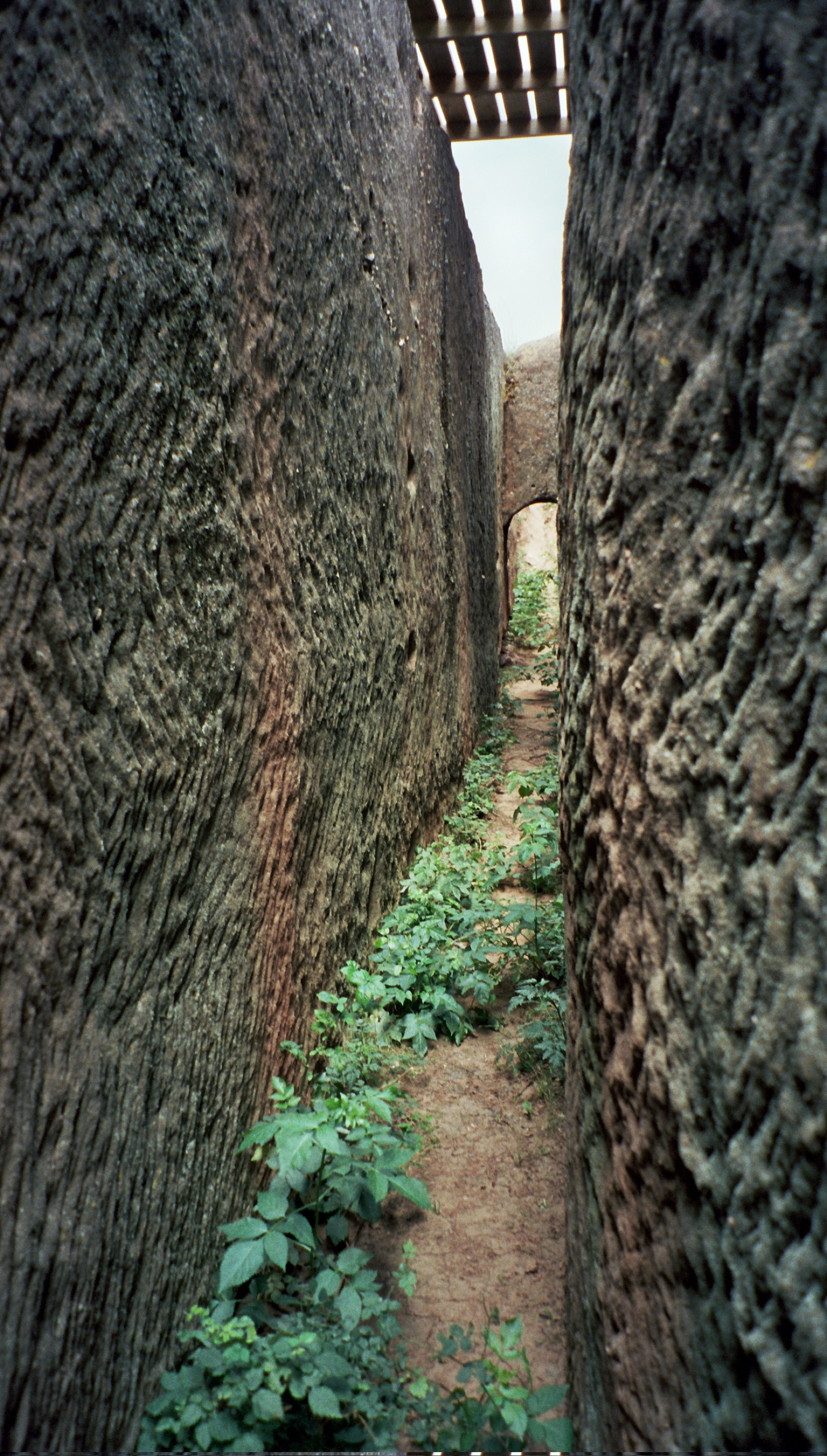
Rock-cut Aqueduct

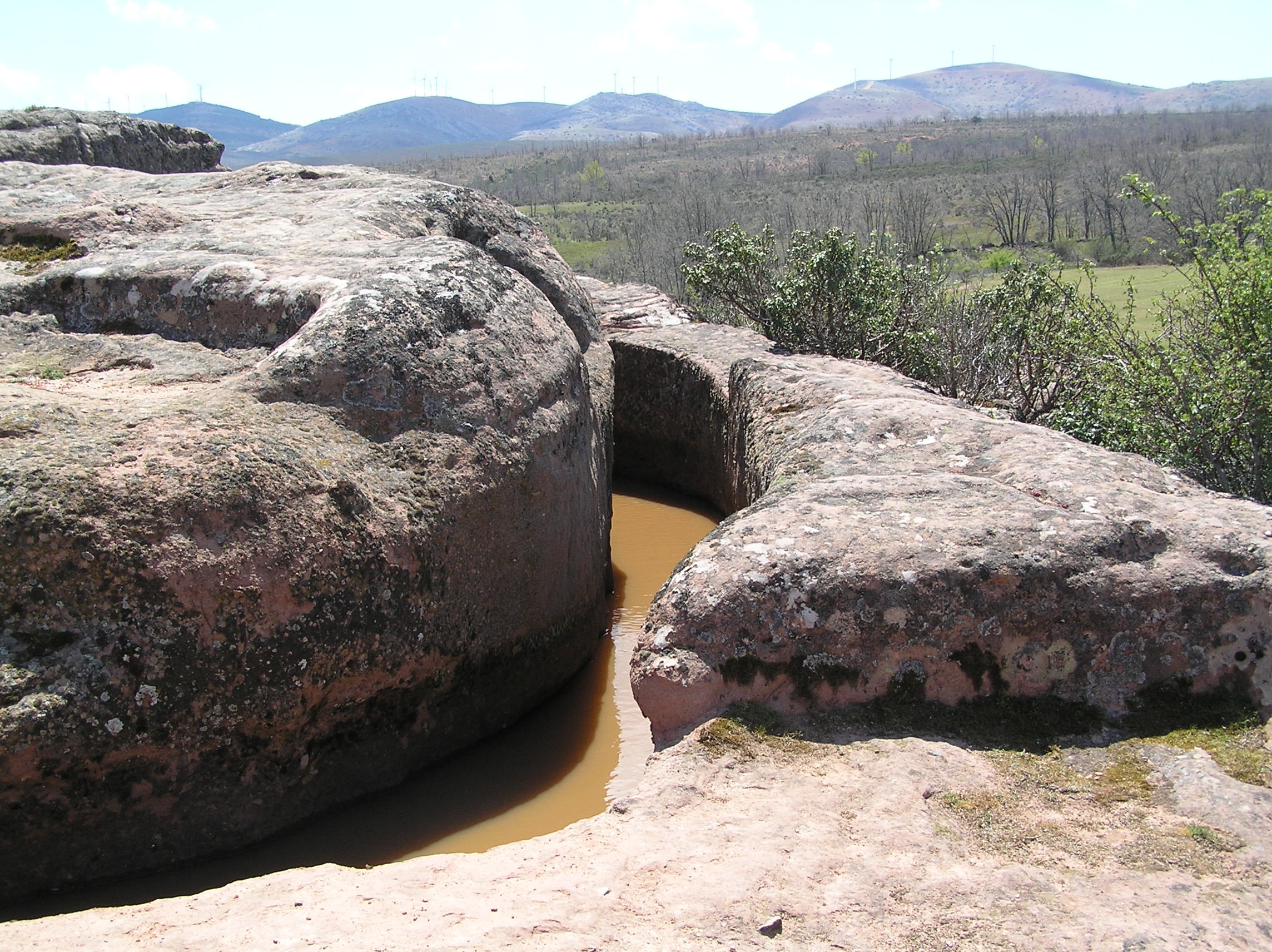
Rock-cut Aqueduct

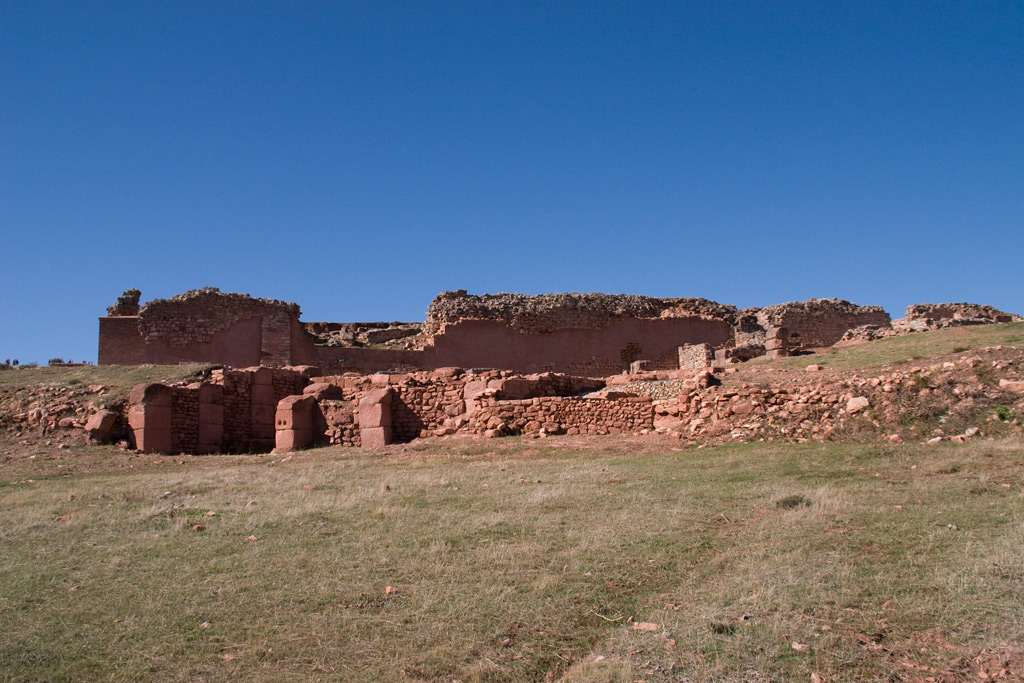
Flavian Forum

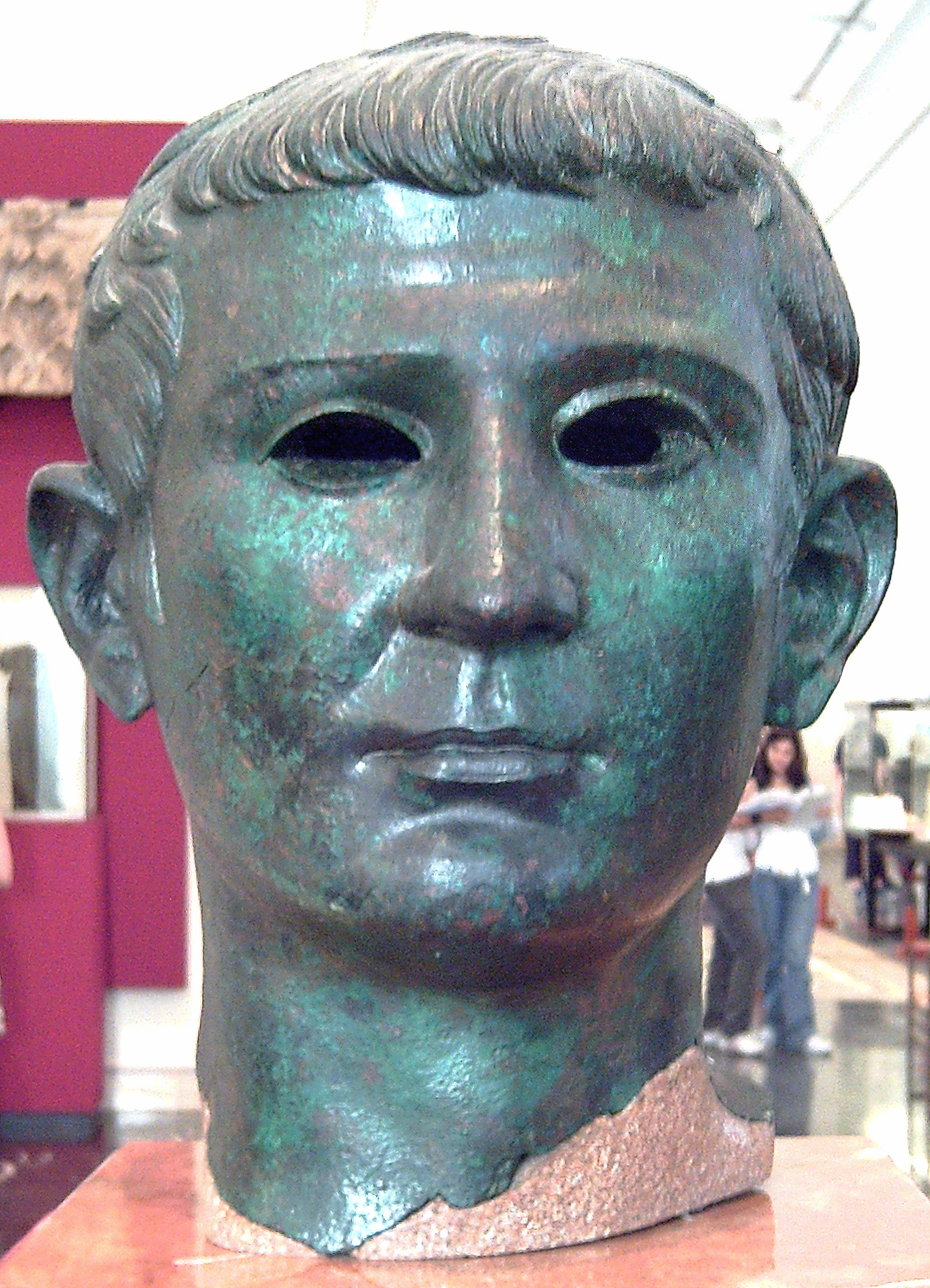
Sculpture now in the National Archaeology Museum

== Conservation and Museum ==
The site is protected by Spanish law, being listed as a Zona Arqueológica. There is a museum at the site, an outpost of the Numantine Museum of Soria. The Friends of the Tiermes Museum (Asociación de Amigos del Museo de Tiermes - AAMT) is an NGO, which was set up in 1988. AAMT is concerned with environmental protection and the promotion of sustainable tourism.

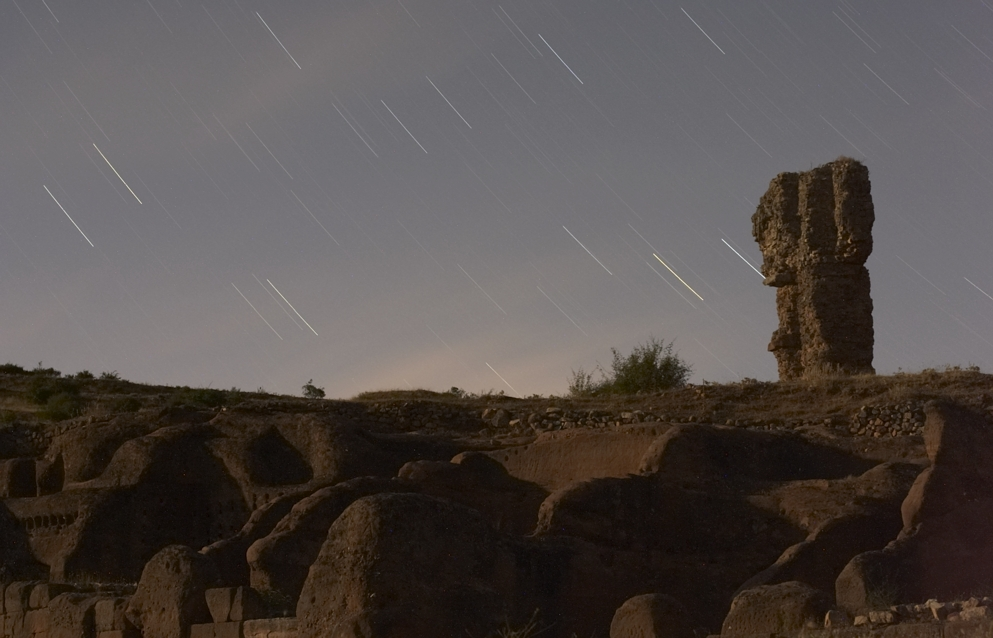

The European LIFE Programme provided funding in the period 2003-2006 to develop eco-cultural tourism in what is an economically marginalised area. Actions for the conservation and enhancement of archaeological and natural heritage have been implemented. The project identified potential for the declaration of a Special Protection Area for birds. Wildlife also includes wolves. Encinares de Tiermes, a Site of Community Importance, was designated a Special Area of Conservation for the species in 2015.

Activities available at Tiermes include guided tours and dark sky astronomy: the latter activity is also promoted at Borobia, another sparsely populated locality in the province of Soria.
