= Regional Archaeological Museum of the Community of Madrid =

Archaeological museum in Alcalá de Henares, Spain

Regional Archaeological Museum
- Museo Arqueológico y Paleontológico de la Comunidad de Madrid
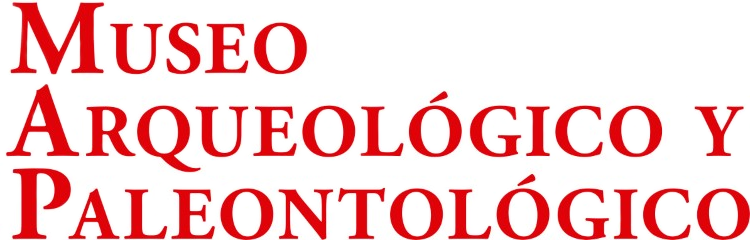

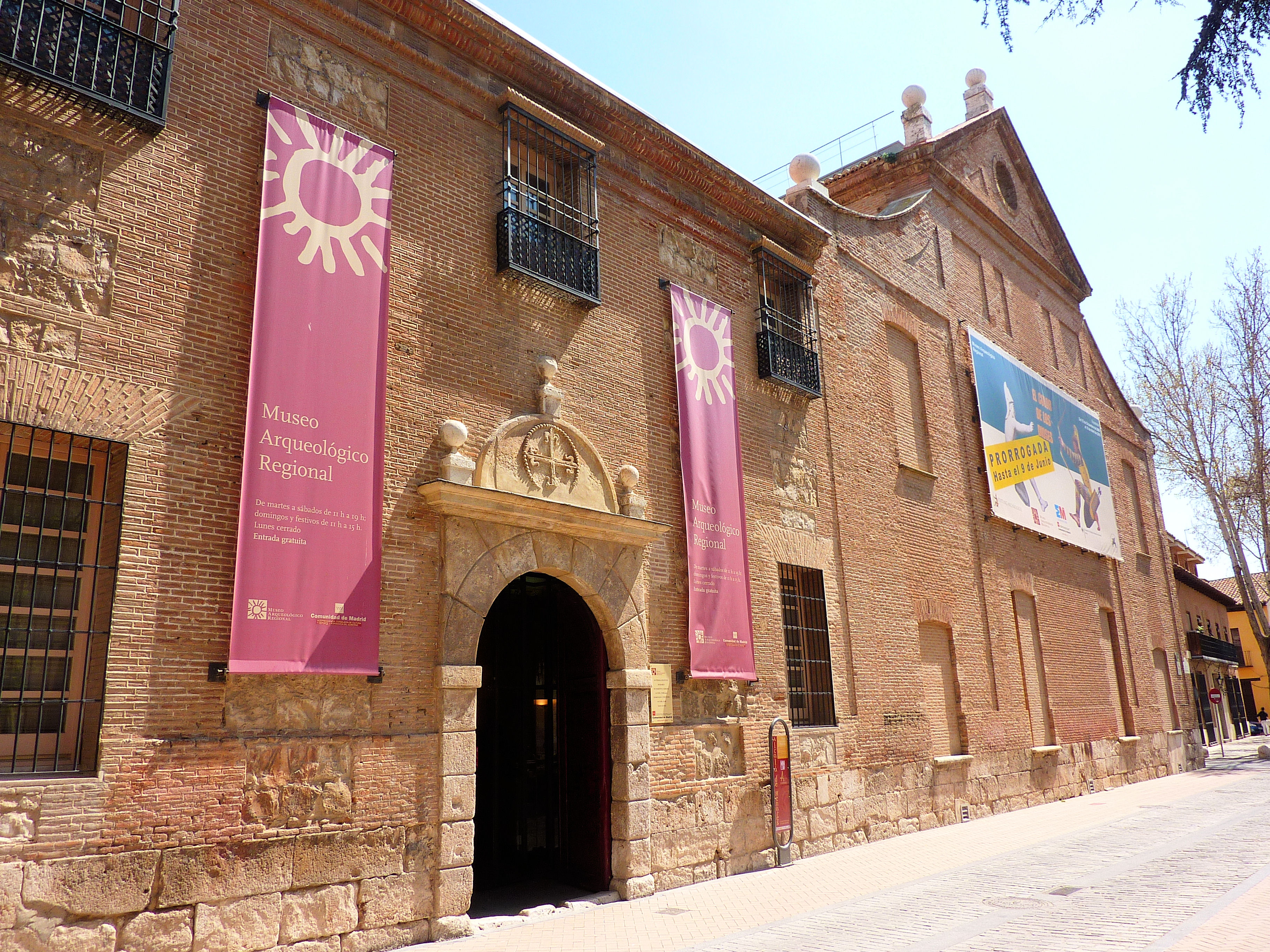
- Established: 25 May 1999
- Location: Alcalá de Henares, Spain
- Coordinates: 40°28′58″N 3°22′08″W
- Type: Archaeological

The Regional Archaeological Museum (Spanish: Museo Arqueológico y Paleontológico de la Comunidad de Madrid; MARPA) is an archaeological museum in Alcalá de Henares, Spain, dependent on the regional administration of the Community of Madrid.

== History ==
Following the creation of the Community of Madrid in 1983 and the transfer to the former of the powers in cultural policies in 1985, a project to create a new regional museum was lined up, as the province of Madrid (already enjoying the National Archaeological Museum) had lacked until that point a provincial museum. The old convent of La Madre de Dios in Alcalá de Henares was chosen as location of the future museum in 1985 and, following works started in 1987, the museum was eventually opened on 25 May 1999.

== Collection ==
The museum exhibits some paleontological findings such as a skull of cave bear found in Patones in 1971, the biggest ever found in the Iberian Peninsula.

The part of the museum devoted to the Roman period includes a number of epigraphic pieces and an important collection of Roman mosaics from Complutum, the Roman-era Alcalá de Henares.

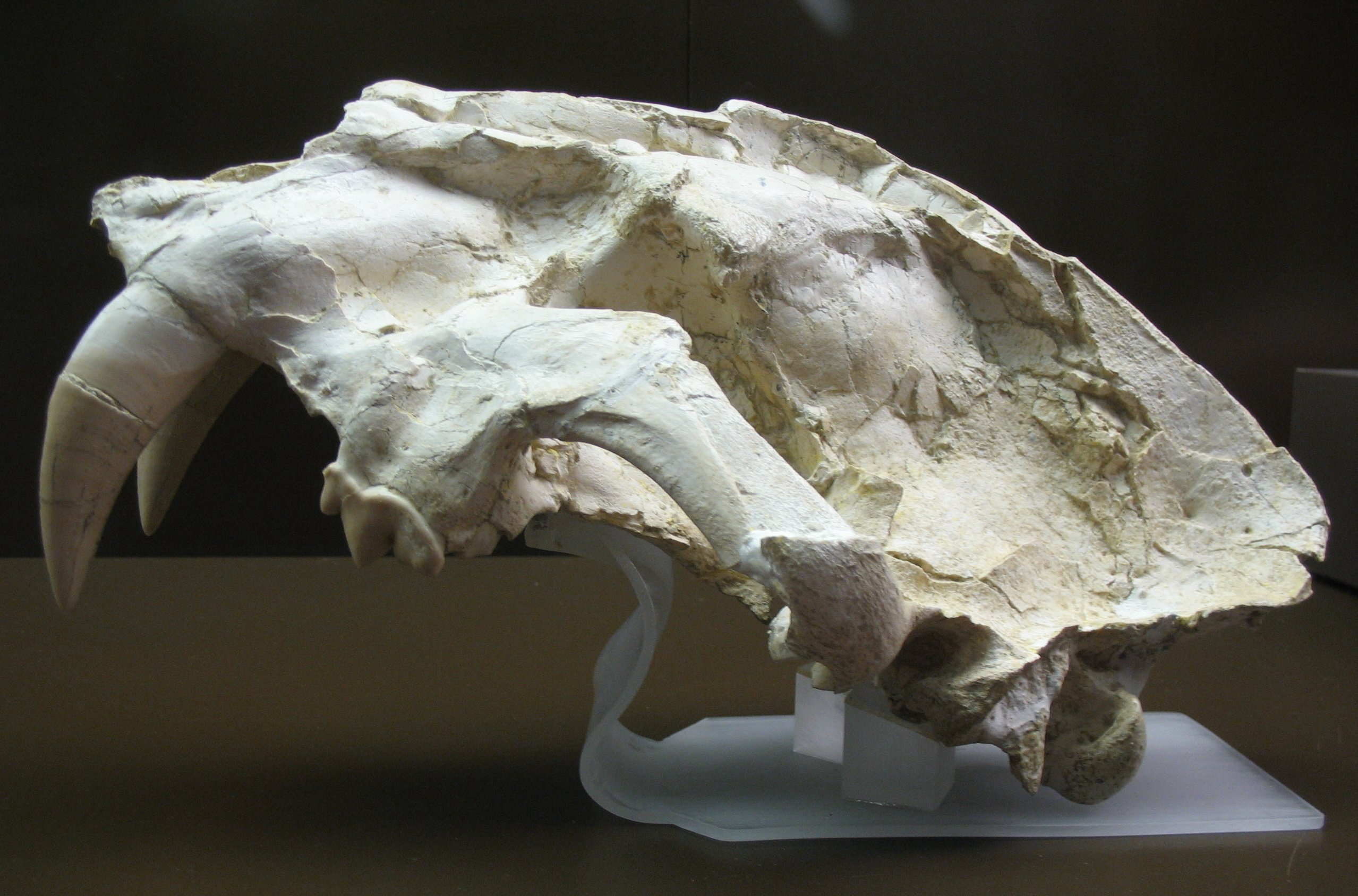
Skull of a Machairodus saber-toothed cat from the Cerro de los Batallones in Torrejón de Velasco

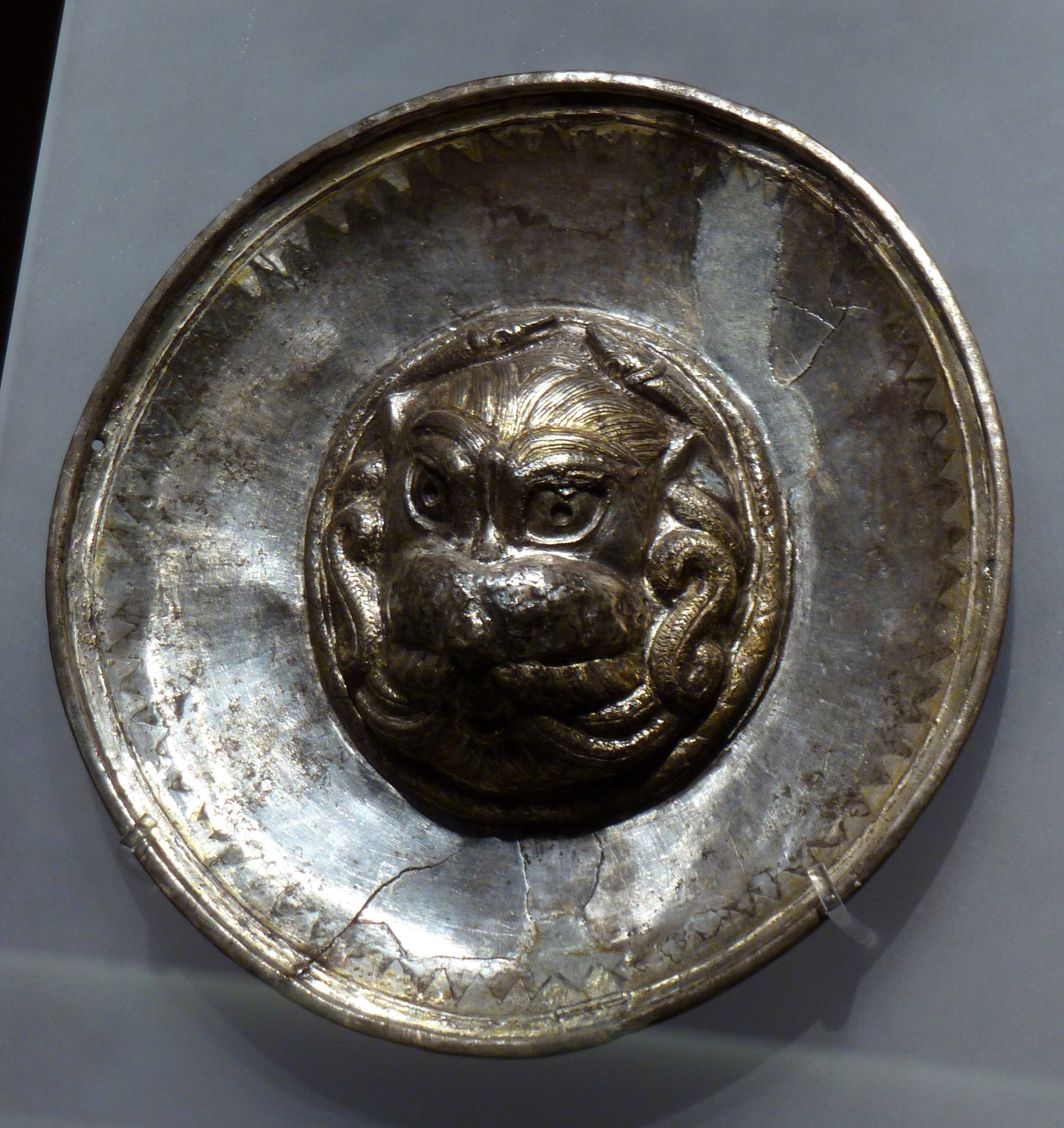
Carpetan Patera of Titulcia

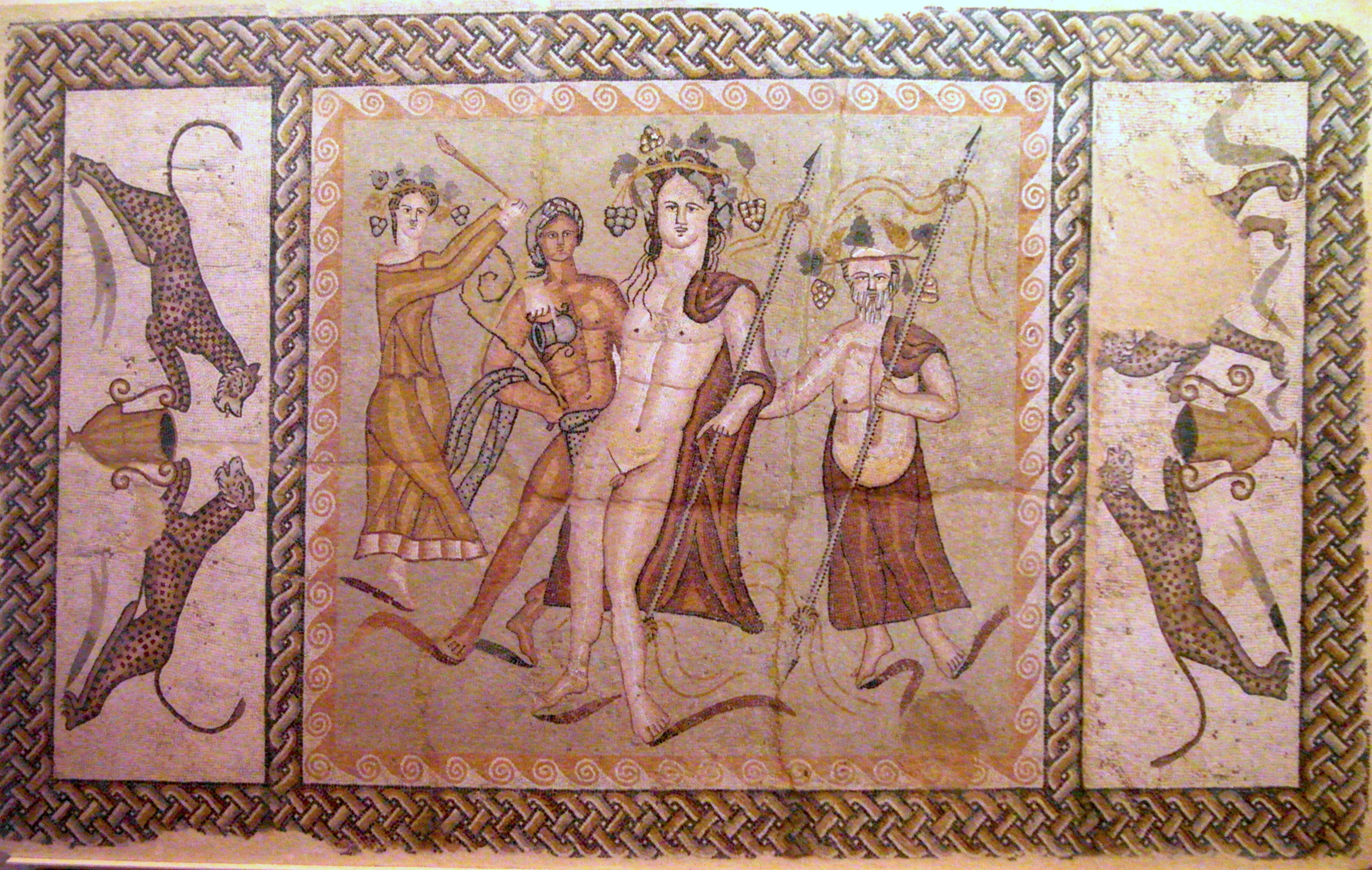
Roman mosaic of Bacchus from Complutum

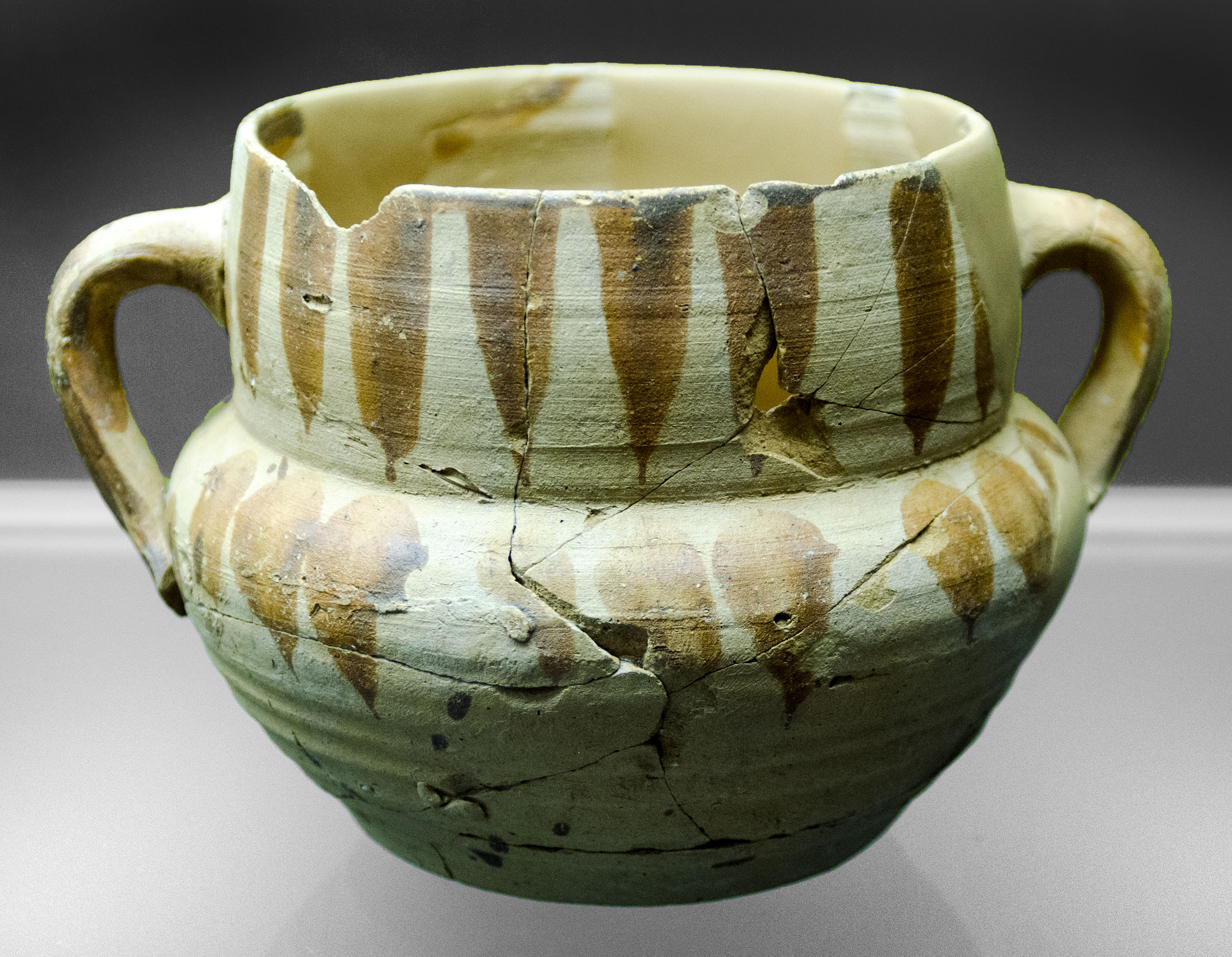
11th-century pot from the Cava Baja in Madrid
