= Orce Man =

Equine fossil mistaken as an early human

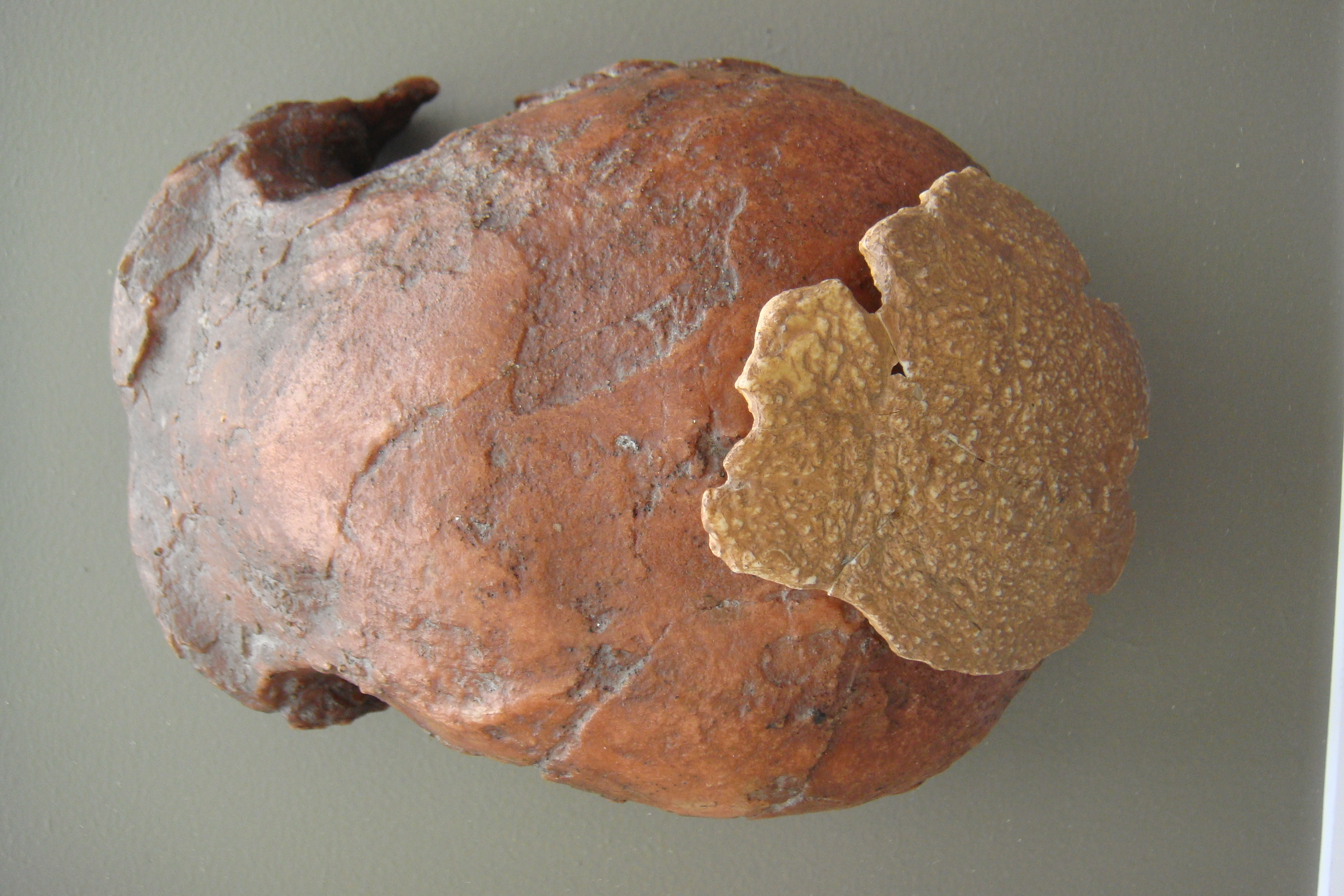
- VM-0 placed over KNM ER 3883.
- Catalog no.: VM-0
- Common name: Orce Man
- Species: Equus altidens
- Age: 1.6 ma
- Place discovered: Venta Micena, Orce, Spain
- Date discovered: 1982–1983
- Discovered by: Josep Gibert

The Orce Man, Orce Donkey, or Venta Micena fossil is a fossil cranium fragment that was historically considered an infantile early European member of Homo. However, later research suggested that the remains actually belonged to the equine species Equus altidens.

== History ==
The specimen was discovered by Josep Gibert in 1982-1983 at Venta Micena, one of several paleo-archaeological sites in the municipality of Orce, Granada, Spain. It was labelled hominid 2 or VM-0 after being freed from sediment by Gibert, Jordi Agustí, and Salvador Moyà-Solà. This team was young and established experts in various fields except paleoanthropology, and took the fragment to Barcelona, which funded the Sabadell Institute of Paleontology and thus their research. They enlisted the paleontologists Rafael Adrover, Pierre Mein, and Peter Andrews for taxonomic identification, and they agreed that the specimen was human.

At this time, the endocast of the vault remained attached to rock, but Gibert's team insisted that the portion cleaned was enough to publish it in May 1983 as the oldest human in Europe, sending it to the Granada press. This sparked scientific interest in Gibraltar as the entrance point into Europe. During another excavation of the same year, they invited Marie-Antoinette and Henry de Lumley to study it, suggesting a hominin identity. The team became very prestigious, planning several lectures and a book on the find, as well as writing articles. Marie-Antoinette de Lumley's conclusions influenced Agustí and Moyà-Solà, but not Gibert.

=== Criticism and media frenzy ===
From October 1983 through April 1984, further preparations revealed a ridge in the endocast of the upper squame on the occipital, which when presented to M.-A. de Lumley again, she became convinced that it was a juvenile Equus. The new opinion racked up eleven articles published in El País in the four days following the controversy, as well as opinion pieces and even cartoons. Gibert's refusal soon became a matter of politics, between "expert" French paleontologists and overcoming colonialism in Spain. Among those who criticized Gibert were Miquel de Renzi, Jaume de Porta, and Jaume Truyols, three professors who thought Gibert's work was reckless and not properly tested. Allegedly, these comments were very damaging to his reputation, possibly leading to demotions and inability to excavate.

Gibert formed a team to prove their classification as Homo, including Agustí, Moyà-Solà and faunal expert Bienvenido Martínez (who had earned a PhD from Gibert) among many others. In total, they wrote 138 publications, including 12 in impact journals in an attempt to circulate his ideas and credibility. He also attended a conference and was met with little backlash, but M.-A. de Lumley attended a separate conference and criticized his work without his presence. Agustí and Moyà-Solà published an article accepting Equus as the identification. In 1995, a conference hosted by Gibert agreed with his findings, leading to a brief period of acceptance followed by statements by José María Bermúdez de Castro and Eudald Carbonell of Atapuerca suggesting that he is not scientifically rigorous.

Baruzzi (2013) note that during this controversy, Gibert maintained an eccentric and unorthodox attitude heading a paradigm shift in human evolution as a sort of revolutionary. Gibert's team broke again, with former members affirming taxonomic allocation to Equus and excavating the site. However, a directorial resignation from the Institute and newfound discussion over the specimen led to excavations being halted.

=== Aftermath ===
Baruzzi suggests that politicians involved in such a media scandal were influenced by the media and were given the power to influence scientific research. As well, Gibert held considerable power in Orce as 'adoptive son of the town' and namesake of the local museum, formerly called the Orce Museum. Since he was considered prestigious locally, Baruzzi suggests that the Orce Man scandal was an attempt to sully his image, and that the media frenzy lessened in 1999. Gibert spent the remainder of his life defending his taxonomic classification of the fragment until his death in 2007 due to lymphatic cancer. Campillo (2006) discovered the skull of a Roman girl and Gibert noted Homo erectus sporting a similar crest. Discussion through media was also newfound, making science easier to engage with and quicker for scientists and the public. Sanchez (2012/2013) used the informal name "Homo orcensis" for VM-0 in a photo caption.

== Description ==
Baruzzi identifies multiple causes for concern in identification of the skull. First is the crest along the occiput, which is expected in Equus and the exception in Homo. Though it is rarely within variation for Homo, the occipital variability is exceedingly large. As well, the coronal suture is seen in the interior but not on the exterior, as it was abraded. This is equine in nature, but Gibert and colleagues suggest that it is not a natural anatomical feature, but rather a posthumous fracture. Digital impressions, like the ridge, are typical of equines but not adult humans, which VM-0 is suggested not to be. A transverse and longitudinal curvature is typical of infant humans, horses and rhinos, or as Agustí proposes, taphonomic deformation. These features, as well as a minute data pool, caused for great controversy.

Gibert et al. (1989) note that comparison with carnivores is impossible due to a prominent sagittal and occipito-transverse crest and defined differences from bears (i.e. suture straightness, closure, impression pronouncement, thickness). They suggested affiliation with Homo erectus KNM ER 3733 and 3883, with dissimilarities to Homo habilis, Arago, Swanscombe, Broken Hill, and Petralona. They found similarity with human children and some likeness to the Sangiran hominins, but not those at Zhoukoudian.

Moyà-Solà and Köhler (1997) suggest that many of Gibert and team's observations are challengeable, most prominently the interpretation of the sutures. They suggest that it is Equus altidens based on how common fossils of this species are at Venta Micena. Additionally, they call for scientists to consider that it is more likely that it is an ordinary equine than a hominin exhibiting rare morphological combinations and pathologies, and that it is flawed "wishful thinking" otherwise.

== Subsequent discoveries ==
Hominin occupation at Orce is generally uncontested because genuine evidence has come to light since the discovery of cranial fragment VM-0.

=== BL02-J54-100 ===
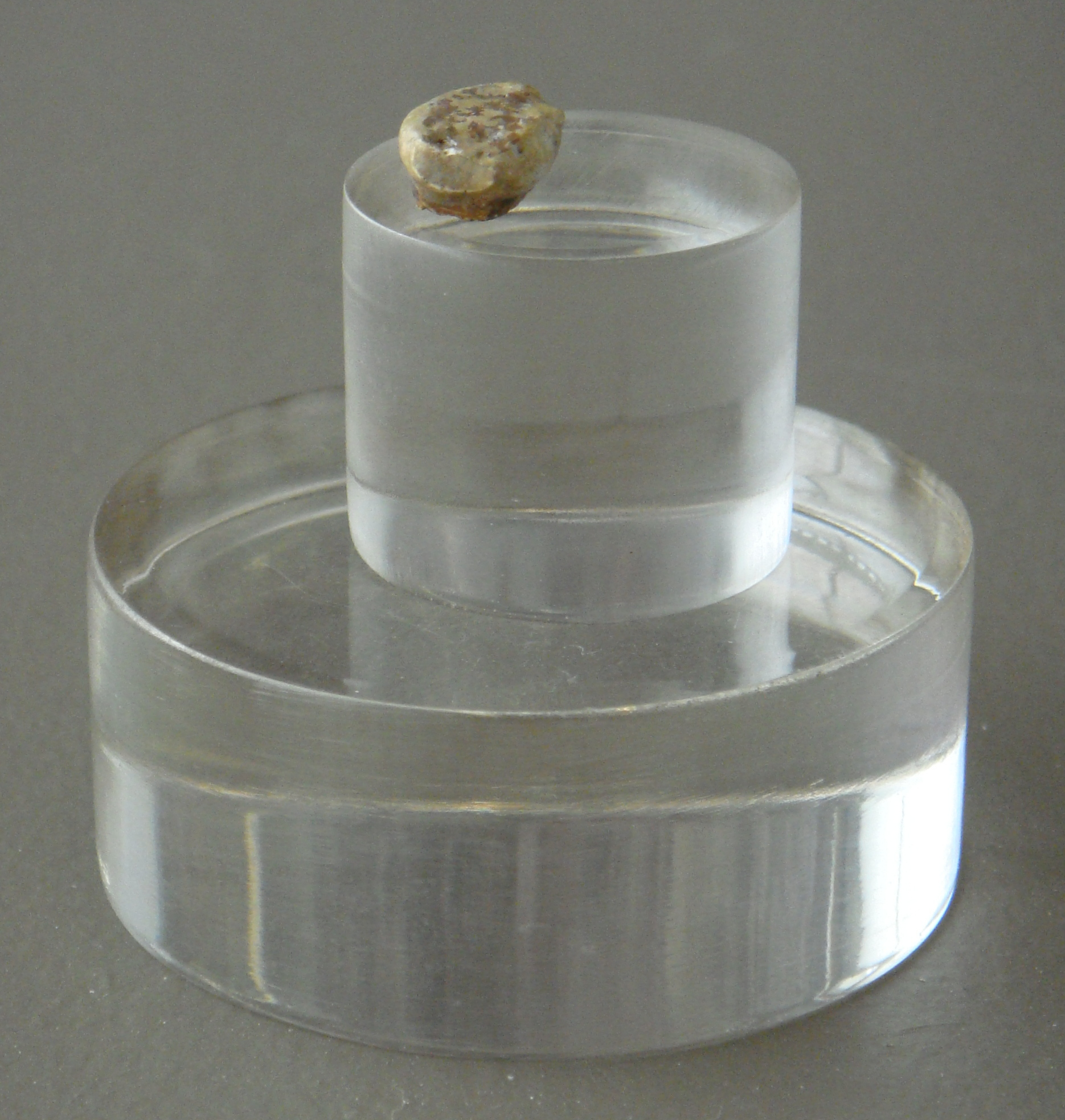
BL02-J54-100, a genuine hominin from Orce.

A lower left first deciduous molar with a worn occlusal surface and resorption in the roots suggesting antemortem shedding, catalogued as BL02-J54-100, was described by Toro-Moyano et al. (2013) and found to be 1.4 million years old. A defined mesial marginal ridge is elongated by a vestigial paraconid and separates from the metaconid by a deep, V-shaped groove, opening in the direction of the lingual face. This is seen in Australopithecus and Homo, especially human specimens KNM-ER 820, KNM-ER 1507, and Zhoukoudian, but absent in Paranthropus. It is a confirmed specimen of Homo due to a tuberculum molare, relative expansion of the mesial cusps and mesial marginal ridge, and the larger and misplaced protoconid. Some similarity with Gran Dolina, Arago, Barranco León and certain Neanderthals is observed, so no taxonomic identification is given.

=== Barranco León artifacts ===
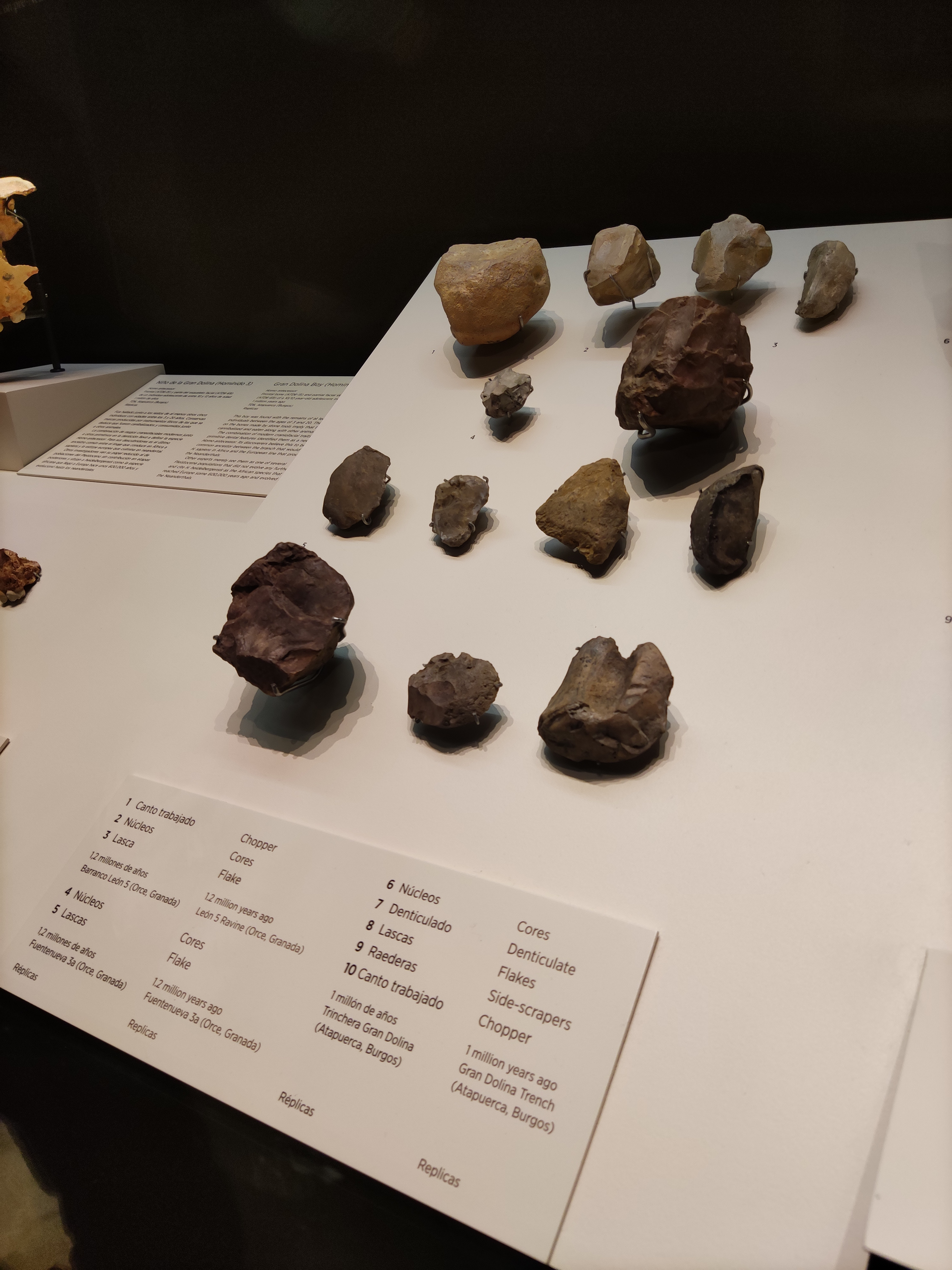
Tools from Barranco León, Orce

Oldowan tools, 1244 (26 cores, 185 whole flakes, 78 flake fragments, 759 debris, 17 retouched, 92 angular fragments, 12 various modified cobbles, and 75 unmodified cobbles), were reported from the 1.4 mya-old Barranco León site in 2013. these tools were produced with flint, quartzite, and limestone, and most raw material was probably originated from Jurassic deposited 3 kilometers south of the site or secondary alluvial/colluvial deposits near the site. They knapped using hard-hammer percussion and direct unipolar and bipolar techniques, coordinated with the texture and quality of the rock. They seem to have prioritized small flakes for immediate use in cutting large carcasses. Striations and polishes are similar to Olduvai, Koobi Fora, and Monte Poggiolo, which indicates use on a variety of materials. Spiral or helical fractures, impact points, flake scars, and bone flakes were discovered on megafaunal remains and are associated with the tools.

== See also ==
- Barranco León (hominins from Orce)
- Dmanisi (early European Homo)
- Shangchen (first European Homo)
- Human evolution
