= Granada Geopark =

Geopark in Andalusia, Spain

Coordinates: 37.60864°N 2.80556°W

The Granada Geopark (Spanish: Geoparque de Granada) is a geopark in Andalusia, Spain which was designated in 2020. As at 2024 Spain has 17 geoparks.

The Granada Geopark is in the sparsely populated north of the province of Granada. It is spread over 47 municipalities. The three principal towns are Huéscar, Baza and Guadix. It includes 72 Lugares de Interés Geológico or LIGs, the Spanish term for geosites.

== Geology ==
The Geopark is notable as a geological record of the Quaternary period. Most of the territory was shaped by an extensive river system that had no outlet to the sea and drained its waters into a large lake.

A number of the geosites, such as Venta Micena, are of paleontological interest.

== Tourism ==
The Geopark aims to promote tourism with a responsible attitude to the environment. The Geopark has promoted a 143 km trekking route, the "First Settlers Great Path", starting and finishing in Huéscar. The name refers to the settlement of Early humans in the area, as evidenced by the geosites of Orce in particular.

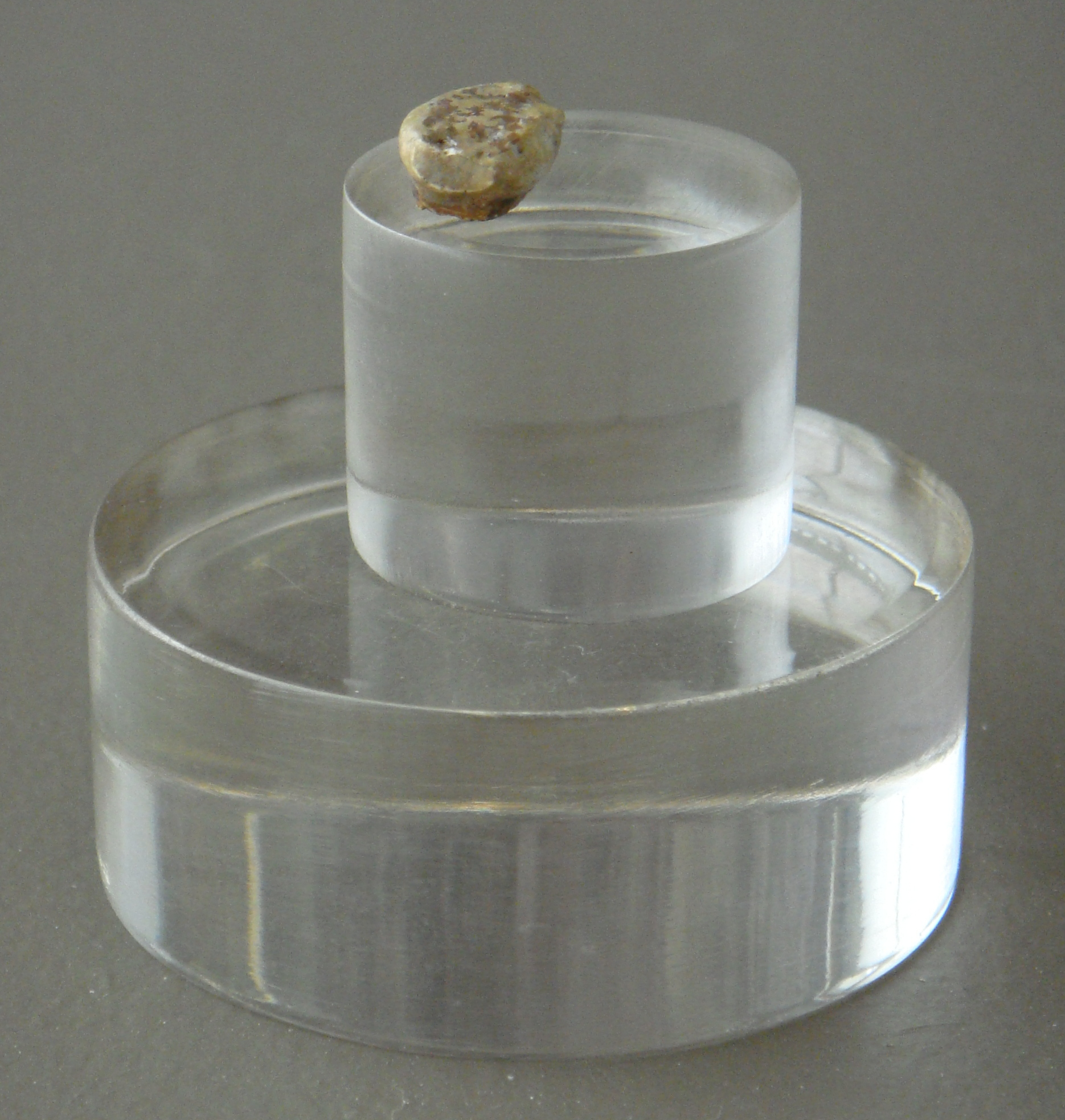
Replica of a milk tooth more than a million years old from Barranco León, Orce

Cave houses are typical of the district and some are let to tourists as a casa rural. Guadix is claimed to have the largest number of cave homes in Europe.

Astronomy is another activity which can be enjoyed in the geopark, thanks to the dark skies.
