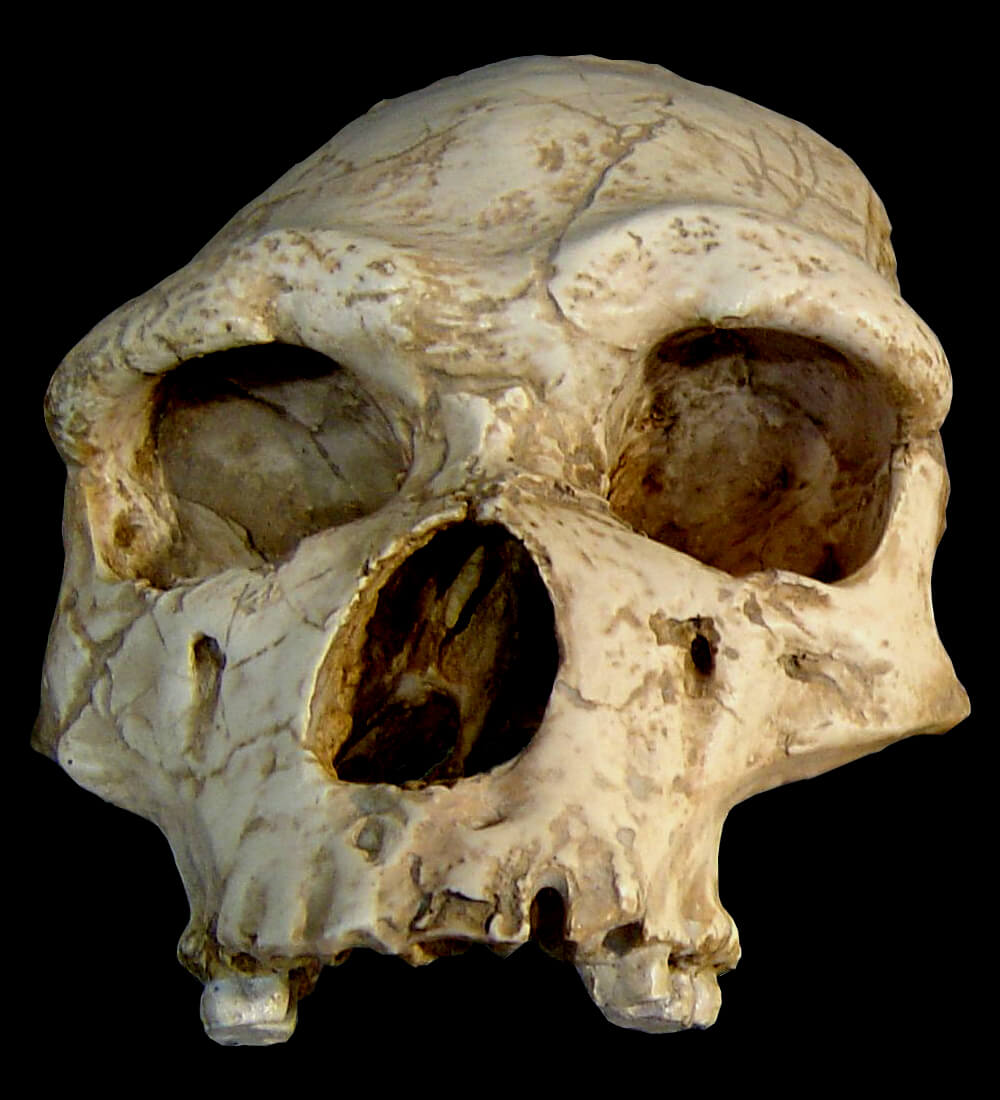
- Reconstructed face of Arago 21

Scientific classification
- Kingdom: Animalia
- Phylum: Chordata
- Class: Mammalia
- Order: Primates
- Superfamily: Hominoidea
- Family: Hominidae
- Genus: Homo
- Species: †H. erectus
- Subspecies: †H. e. tautavelensis

Trinomial name
- †Homo erectus tautavelensis de Lumley and de Lumley, 1979
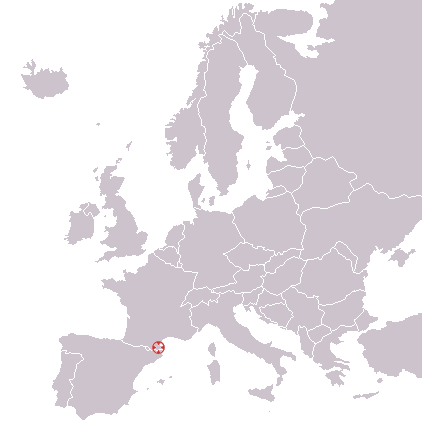
- Site of discovery in Tautavel, France

= Tautavel Man =

Tautavel Man Temporal range: 0.55–0.4 Ma

Homo erectus fossil

Tautavel Man refers to the archaic humans which—from approximately 550,000 to 400,000 years ago—inhabited the Caune de l’Arago, a limestone cave in Tautavel, France. They are generally grouped as part of a long and highly variable lineage of transitional morphs which inhabited the Middle Pleistocene of Europe, and would eventually evolve into the Neanderthals (Homo neanderthalensis or H. sapiens neanderthalensis). They have been variably assigned to either H. (s.?) heidelbergensis, or as a European subspecies of H. erectus as H. e. tautavelensis. The skull is reconstructed based on the specimens Arago 21 and 47 (probably male), and it is, to a degree, more characteristic of what might be considered a typical H. erectus (sensu stricto) morphology than a typical H. heidelbergensis morphology. The brain capacity is 1,166 cc. They seem to have had an overall robust skeleton. Average height may have been 166 cm (5 ft 5 in).

The Caune de l'Arago opens on a cliffside 80 m (260 ft) above a river, overlooking the Tautavel plain, with a plateau above, and mountainous terrain to the sides. During and after human occupation, the area swung from temperate and humid forestland, to cold and dry steppeland. Stratigraphically, humans are present from beds Q–C. Bed G, dating to roughly 455,000 years old during a forested event, has yielded the most remains. They seem to have hunted a variety of animals, including red deer, fallow deer, argali, tahr, horse, reindeer, beaver, and the extinct narrow-nosed rhinoceros, among others. They made Acheulean stone tools, but mainly produced smaller retouched tools such as scrapers, rather than more iconic macro-tools such as bifaces (hand axes). In beds G and F, they may have been practicing ritual cannibalism. Evidence of fire is absent until bed C (400,000 years ago).

== Research history ==
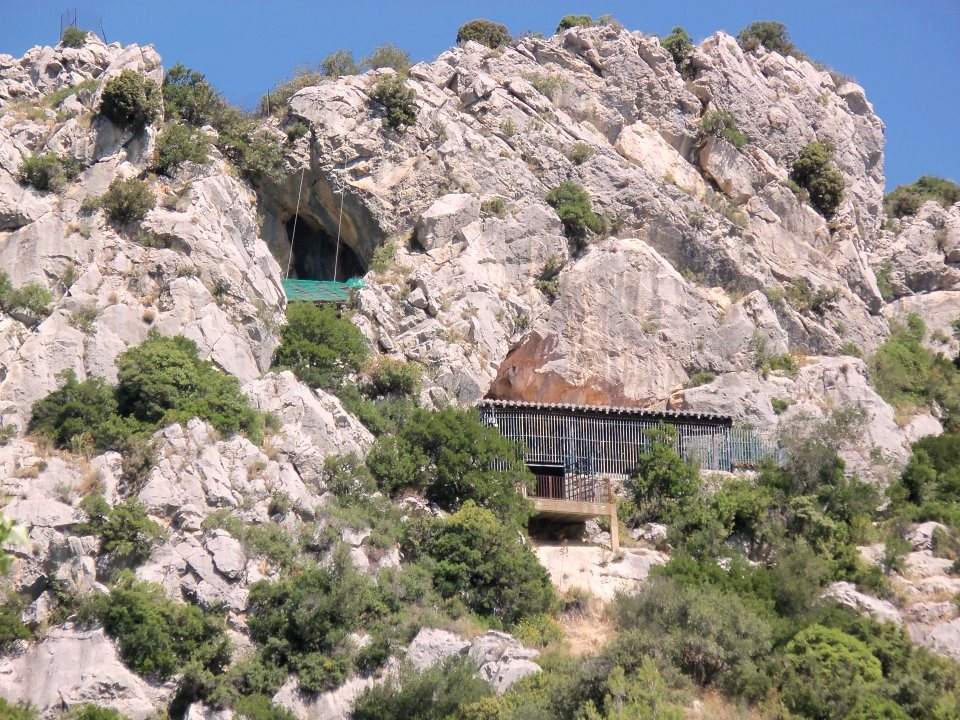
Opening to the Caune de l’Arago along a cliff-face, 80 m (260 ft) above the Verdouble river

Animal fossils were first reported from the Caune de l’Arago in 1828 by French geologist Marcel de Serres, who considered them antediluvian remains (before the Great Flood in the biblical chronology). In 1963, French archaeologist Jean Abélanet recovered stone tools, which inspired French archaeologist Henry de Lumley to continue excavation for human remains. He found such remains in 1964, and recovered the first face (Arago 21) in 1971. He and fellow archaeologist Marie-Antoinette de Lumley (his wife) formally described the remains that same year. They dated them to the Riss glaciation—that is, predating the European Neanderthals (H. neanderthalensis or H. sapiens neanderthalensis).

They and subsequent researchers made several parallels between the Arago material and Homo erectus (both sensu stricto Asian specimens and sensu lato specimens beyond Asia) as well as to Neanderthals. Similarly, these fossils were initially postulated to represent an intermediate form between H. erectus and Neanderthals, and were commonly referred to as "Pre-Neanderthals" to avoid assigning them to a specific species. Nonetheless, in 1979, the de Lumley's suggested the name "H. e. tautavelensis", but subsequent authors preferred to classify the remains into the then strictly Middle Pleistocene European H. heidelbergensis, described from the German Mauer 1 mandible in 1908. H. heidelbergensis is typically defined as the direct ancestor of Neanderthals.

The skull of the Tautavel inhabitants can only be reconstructed using the crushed (and thus distorted) partial face Arago 21 and the partial parietal bone Arago 47. The actual shape of the skull before crushing was speculated using the skulls of contemporaneous European humans (that is, H. heidelbergensis). It is possible Arago 21 and 47 represent the same individual. Several such reconstructions were done in the 1980s, with the conclusion of strong affinities to H. heidelbergensis. The first reconstruction was done by French moulder René David, with the oversight of Mrs. de Lumley, and was completed in 1982. Other reconstructions were made in 1982 and again in 1986 by Italian palaeontologist Antonio Ascenzi; in 1982 and again in 1984 by French anthropologist Éliane Spitery; in 1986 by Czech palaeoanthropologist Emanuel Vlček; in 1982 and again in 1991 by French palaeoanthropologist Dominique Grimaud-Hervé; in 2005 by French anthropologist Gaspard Guipert (digitally uncrushing and reconstructing the skull); and most recently by Mrs. de Lumley in 2015. Like his predecessors, Guipert decided to relegate the material to H. heidelbergensis, and defined H. heidelbergensis as a highly polymorphic (variable) species. In 2015, Mrs. de Lumley redescribed the Arago material, and decided to consider H. e. tautavelensis as a completely distinct and valid subspecies (diverging from H. heidelbergensis and the Neanderthal line) by using a much stricter definition of H. heidelbergensis and focusing on the parallels between the Tautavel remains and H. erectus s. s. The Tautavel remains are quite similar to other archaic human remains from Europe which have variously been classified as H. erectus or H. heidelbergensis depending on the definition of these species: Ceprano, Italy; Galería, Spain; Swanscombe, England; Vértesszőlős, Hungary; and Petralona, Greece.

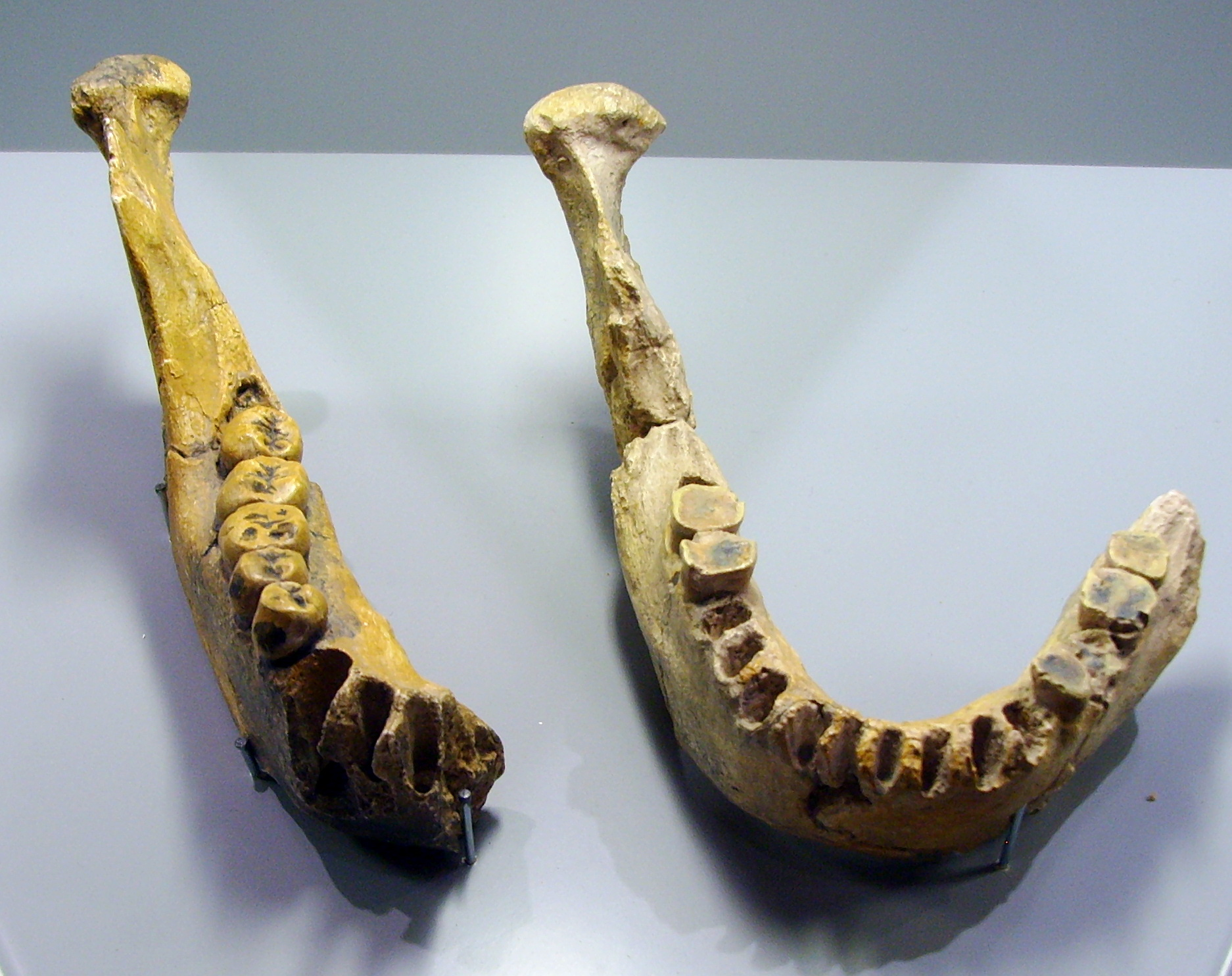
Replicas of Arago 13 (left) and 2 (right)

By 2014, a total of 148 human bones had been recovered from the Caune de l'Arago, including 123 teeth, 5 jawbones, 9 upper limb elements, and 19 lower limb elements. These represent 18 adults and 12 juveniles, 30 individuals in total. Based on dental development, about 30% of the specimens died between the ages of 7 and 12, 37% between 18 and 30, 30% between 30 and 40, and 3% over 40. This would give an average life expectancy (assuming the individual survived infancy) of 20–25 years. The perceived infant mortality rate (from ages 1–6) is 11%, which is conspicuously low. If especially robust bones are assumed to be males, then females slightly outnumber males, but the proportion is roughly equally. All the non-tooth skull specimens (Arago 21, 47, and 45) are assumed to be male. For the jawbone specimens, only Arago 13 is assumed to be male, and the others (Arago 2, 89, 119, 130, and 131) are assumed to be female. The iliac specimens (a hip bone), Arago 44 and 121, are female.

Phylogenetic analyses have placed the Arago population within a Homo heidelbergensis clade, potentially as the lineage most closely related to the Mauer population.

== Anatomy ==
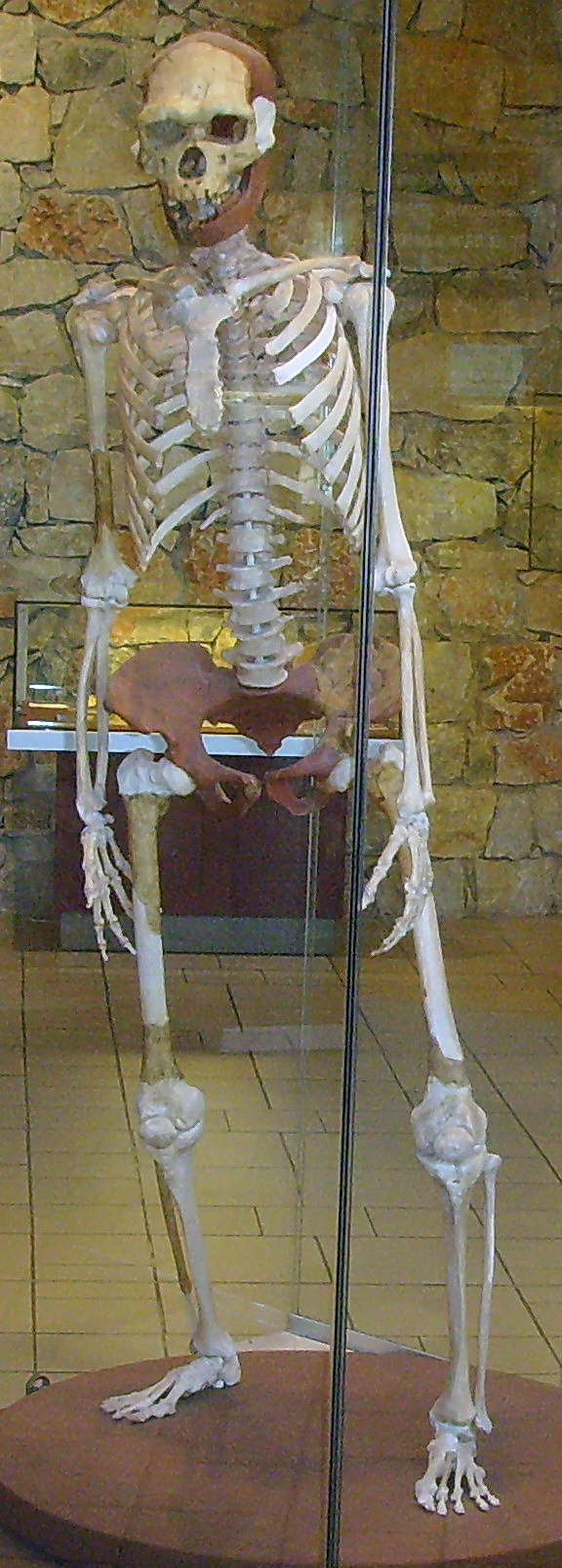
Reconstructed skeleton of Tautavel Man

The reconstructed skull of Tautavel Man (based on Arago 21 and 47) shares many similarities with that of H. erectus s. s. These include: strongly defined brows, a receding forehead, a relatively low face, a depression between the eyebrows, post-orbital constriction, strongly defined ridges below the eye sockets, a weak chin (with developed prognathism), strong and thick jaws, U-shaped tooth rows, and marked sexual dimorphism (with males notably more robust than females). However, it differs in having a wider base, more forwardly oriented cheek bones, more massive supraorbital trigons (the triangles on the frontal bone formed by the brows and the two temporal lines), and a more defined post-orbital constriction. According to Mrs. de Lumley, they differ from the roughly contemporaneous H. heidelbergensis by retaining basal (archaic) characteristics, including a longer skull, more defined brow ridge, more receding forehead, less defined post-orbital constriction, less developed prognathism, and smaller brain capacity—that is, by being somewhat more H. erectus grade than H. neanderthalensis grade. The Arago 21 face probably belonged to a 20-year-old, as indicated by the state of the fronto-pariental suture; based on its robustness, it is assumed to be male.

The reconstructed Tautavel skull measures 199 mm (7.8 in) along its long axis. This maximum measurement is similar to that of H. erectus from Sangiran and longer than the Sima de los Huesos (SH) hominins (which are typically assigned to H. heidelbergensis), but shorter than that of Neanderthals, whose braincase was further developed. The length of the short axis is 144 mm (5.7 in), which is typical of contemporaneous and more ancient H. erectus s. s. and within the exceptionally wide range reported for the SH hominins, but is narrower than more recent hominins, including more recent H. erectus s. s. For comparison, the dimensions of a modern human skull average 176 mm × 145 mm (6.9 in × 5.7 in) for men and 171 mm × 140 mm (6.7 in × 5.5 in) for women. Like H. erectus s. s., the Tautavel face strongly projects from back to front, with the face-to-skull-base length ratio (ratio between the distance from the face to the base of the skull, versus the length of the base of the skull itself) being 48.1%. In comparison, this ratio is 44% in Neanderthals, and 38% in modern humans. As for the mandibles, the robust male jawbones align more closely to H. erectus s. s., whereas the more gracile female ones cluster closer to the Mauer mandible, the SH hominins, and Neanderthals. This demonstrates rather strong jaw musculature in the Tautavel inhabitants, as well as pronounced sexual dimorphism. The Tautavel mandibles all have strongly developed mandibular tori (ridges bordering the tongue in the cheek), subhorizontal mylohyoid lines (ridges running on the exterior of the body of the mandible), deep and narrow submandibular fovea (below the mylohyoid lines), and a narrow and convex plane which merges into the tori. The teeth are proportionally quite large for a Middle Pleistocene European human, notably the P4 (2nd premolar) and M2 (2nd molar). The cusps of the molars retain an anterior fovea, a mesial and distal trigonid crest, a cusp of Carabelli, and one or two accessory cusps, which are basal traits.

In 1983, American anthropologist Ralph Holloway estimated the brain volume as 1,166 cc (71.2 cu in) using the Arago 21 face, Arago 47 parietal, and Swanscombe occipital bone. This volume is comparable to that of Peking Man from Zhoukoudian, China, and is on the lower end of the range of variation for modern humans. Originally, Holloway theorized that Tautavel Man was a "very garrulous [talkative] individual" based on the expanded Broca's area (which is associated with speech production in modern humans), but in 2004 he admitted "this was pure speculation." Evidence regarding the speech capability of Middle Pleistocene European hominins is mixed. A 400,000-year-old hyoid bone (which supports the tongue and thus humanlike speech production) from Castel di Guido, Italy, assigned to a terminal population of H. erectus is quite apelike, but a hyoid bone from the SH hominins (on the Neanderthal line) appears quite humanlike.

As for the rest of the skeleton, the only elements of the spine and torso identified are a single atlas and axis bones (the first two neck vertebrae), and two clavicles. For the arms, four humeri and an ulna, which are notably massive, were discovered. For the pelvis, four pelvic bones and a sacrum were identified; the two identified iliac wings are quite robust. The acetabulum (where the leg connects to the hip) is oval-shaped much like in H. erectus, as opposed to circular, as in modern humans and Neanderthals. For the legs, seven femora, two tibiae, and seven fibulae have been identified, and, as in H. erectus, they are quite thick; this would have constricted the medullary cavity, where bone marrow is stored. This thickening is generally explained as being due to fast bone growth in adolescence. As in Neanderthals, the leg bones are quite robust, which may be a response to the cold climate, greater physical activity, or both. Using the femora and fibulae, Tautavel Man's average height has been estimated as roughly 166 cm (5 ft 5 in).

== Culture ==
=== Palaeoenvironment ===
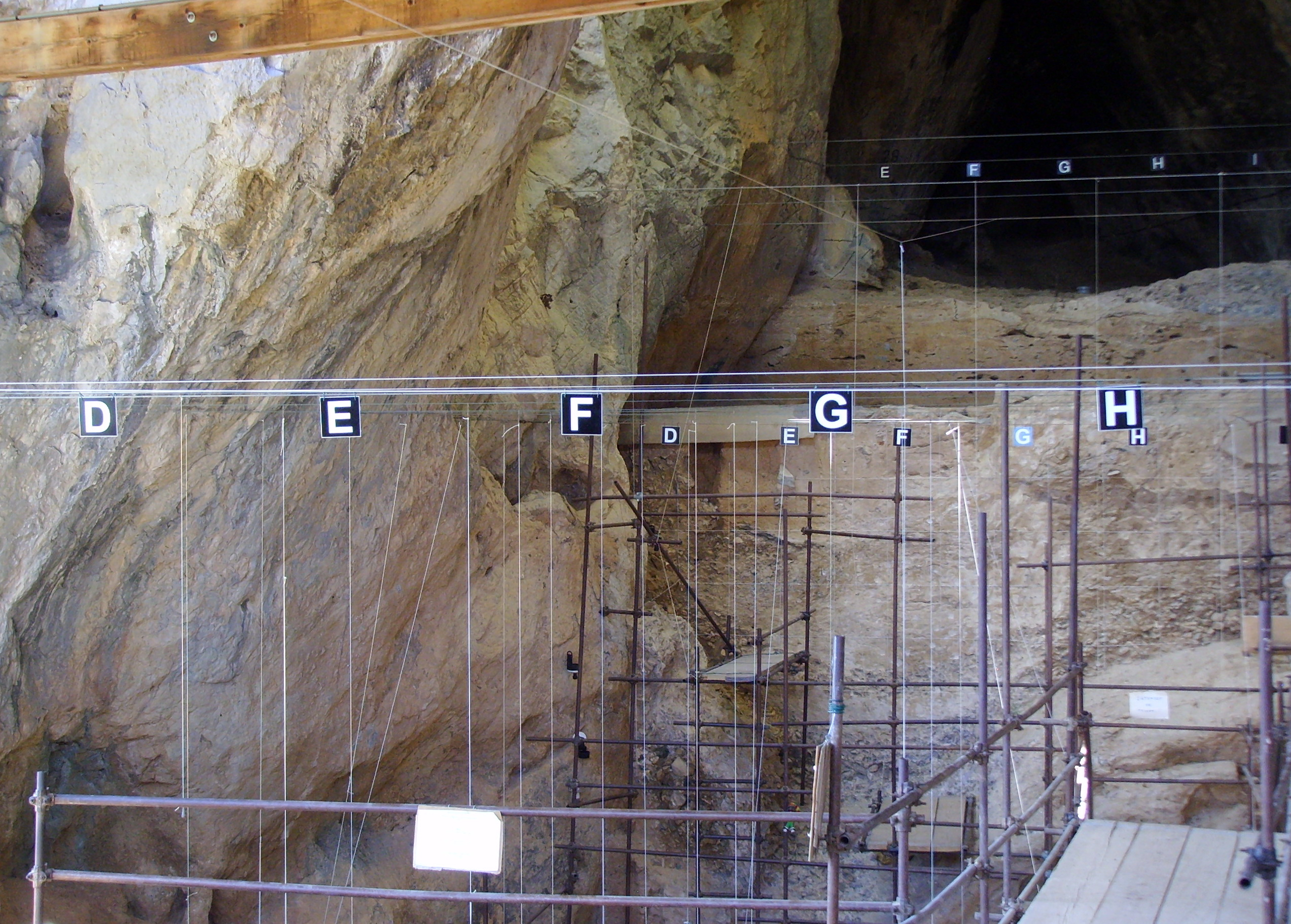
Beds D–H during 2008 excavation

The Caune de l’Arago is currently 35 m (115 ft) long and varies 5 to 9 m (16 to 30 ft) in width, but the walls and roof have likely caved in significantly over the last hundreds of thousands of years. Excavation of the site is overseen by the IPH (Institut de Paléontologie Humaine) and the CERPT (Centre Européen de Recherche Préhistorique de Tautavel). This limestone cave opens along a cliff wall 80 m (260 ft) above the Verdouble river, overlooking the Tautavel plain. The fossil-bearing deposits go down 11 m (36 ft). The deposits are stratified into Lower Stratigraphic, Middle Stratigraphic, Upper Stratigraphic, and Upper Stalagmitic Complexes, and human remains come from the Middle and the very beginning of the Upper Stratigraphic Complexes. These deposits are further subdivided into 4 units and 17 beds (from bottom to surface): Unit 1 (beds Q, P, O, N, M, L, and K), Unit 2 (J, I, and H), Unit 3 (G, F, E, and D), and Unit 4 (C, B, and A). Beds Q–C bear human remains, and span oxygen isotope stages 14–10 (roughly 550–400 thousand years ago). They are made of sand and aeolian sandy loam, overlain by a thick stalagmite layer, overlain by a breccia. Almost all human remains came from bed G, which has been dated to 455,000 years ago using uranium–thorium dating. The cave is one of the earliest known inhabited caves in the Pyrenees.

Throughout human occupation, the Caune de l'Arago provided access to a mountainous and riverine habitat, a plateau above, and a plain below. The plain and plateau repeatedly swung between a temperate and humid forested region dominated by pine, deciduous, and cypress trees and mediterranean plants, to a cold and dry grassy steppe (switching from forest to steppe about 550,000 years ago; reverting 480,000 years ago; switching again 420,000 years ago; and continuing this pattern after occupation). During the forested periods, the mammal assemblage of the cave can predominantly feature red deer (Cervus elaphus), fallow deer (Dama clactoniana), argali (Ovis ammon antiqua), narrow-nosed rhinoceros (Stephanorhinus hemitoechus), and tahrs (Hemitragus bosali). Predators in the temperate intervals include the cave lynx (Lynx spelaeus), cave lion (Panthera spelaea), dhole (Cuon priscus), red fox (Vulpes vulpes), the wolf Canis mosbachensis, and the bear Ursus deningeri. Bears and humans possibly occupied the cave during different seasons of the year when human occupation was intermittent. In the cold events, horse (Equus mosbachensis), reindeer (Rangifer tarandus), steppe bison (Bos priscus), giant musk ox (Praeovibos priscus), and rhinoceros could be abundant. This cave also has the earliest evidence of beaver (Castor fiber) hunting in beds G and J. Like many other human sites, the inhabitants in different beds preferentially targeted a certain prey item over others, such as reindeer in bed L, red and fallow deer in bed J, and musk ox at the top of bed G. Argali is commonly found in all beds, and may have been brought in not only by humans but also non-human carnivores, particularly in beds O, N, and M.

Looking at the dental development of animals under two years old, it is possible to tell what time of year the animal was hunted, and thus, when the inhabitants occupied the cave. Based on this, long-term occupation was featured in bed G; intermittent occupation of a few months in beds P, J, I, F, E, and D; and short occupation with little hunting at all in bed L. Similarly, human baby teeth are present in the long term and seasonally inhabited beds, indicating entire families with children inhabited the cave; these are absent in bed L, which could mean only brief habitation by a small hunting party.

=== Technology ===
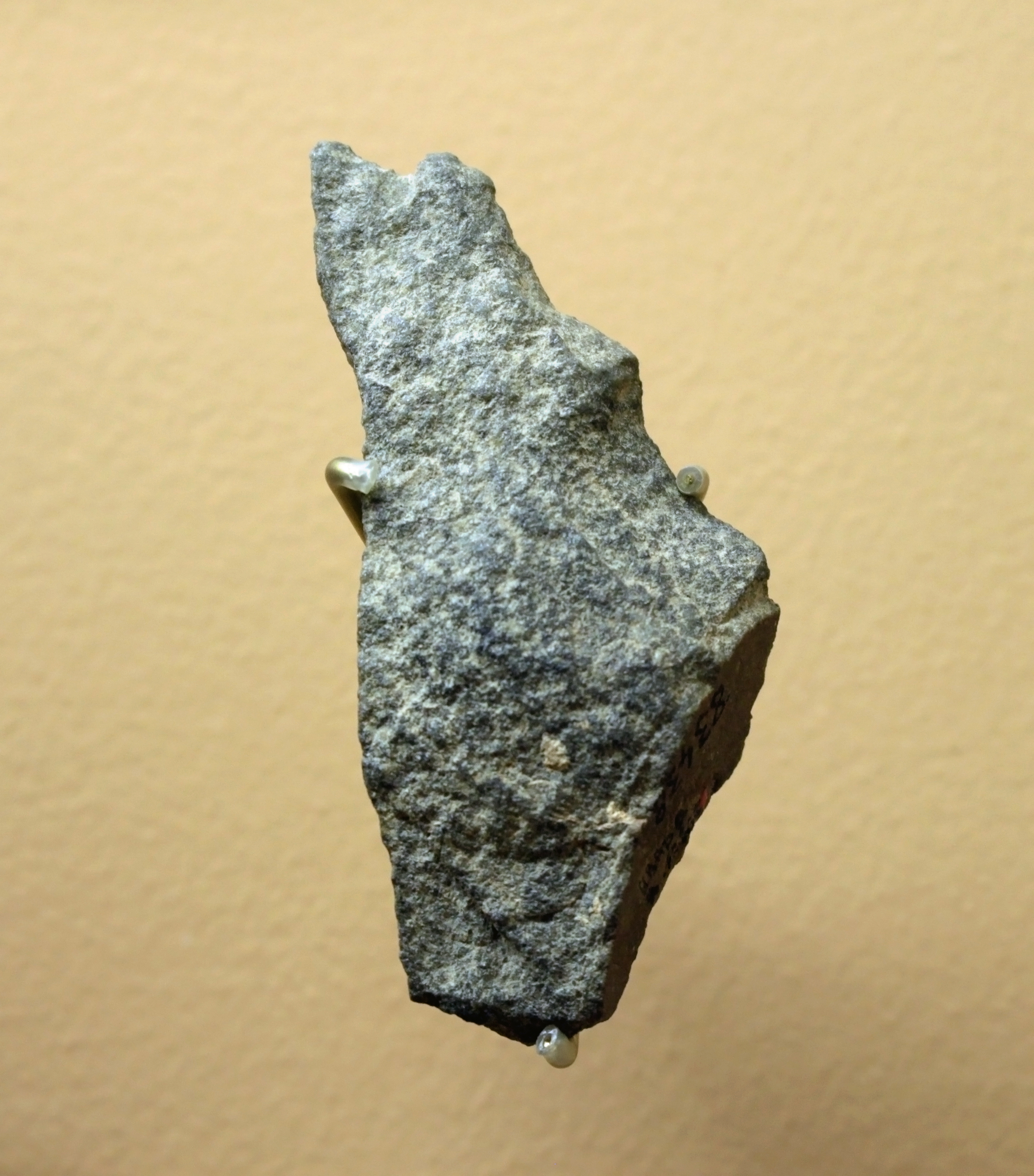
Denticulate tool from the Caune de l'Arago

To describe the stone tool industry present in the Caune de l'Arago, the de Lumley's had coined the term "Proto-Cherantian" (the Cherantian is a possible subtype of the Neanderthal Mousterian industry), defined as a tradition which produces few bifaces (hand axes). They changed this to "Mediterranean Acheulean" in 2004, and the label "Proto-Cherantian" is no longer widely used.

About 63% of the tools are large stone shards, 32% retouched tools, 3% lithic cores, and 2% macro-tools. Excluding debris and simple chipping, smaller retouched tools make up 90% of the tool assemblage, and macro-tools are 10%. Among these retouched tools, 36% are simple scrapers, 16% retouched notches, 11% Clactonian notches, 12% denticulate tools, 3% denticulated scrapers (with a notched edge), and 2% convergent scrapers (which have a point at the end). Among the macro-tools, 64% are elaborate choppers (pebbles with multiple flakes cleaved out to make it sharp), 13% primary choppers (with a single flake cleaved out), 9% chopping tools, 7% rabots (a chopper made out of a lithic flake rather than a core), 4% bifaces (hand axes), 3% unifaces, and 0.8% polyhedron- and spheroid-shaped tools. Of the elaborate choppers, about 60% have a single edge, 26% have multiple points, and 9% are converging points with two edges and a single point. Bifaces are tools which feature perfect symmetry on both sides, and are sometimes interpreted as having been produced this way for purely aesthetic purposes.

Low quality quartz, sandstone, quartzose sandstone, and limestone (raw materials for tools) could have been collected from the river cobble. Higher quality jasper, flint, quartzite, and blue translucent quartz rocks (more suitable for knapping tools) could have been collected within 15–30 km (9.3–18.6 mi). The most common material used was vein quartz, probably because it was a common river cobble, and because it produced the most reliable cutting edge among local minerals and the inhabitants were predominantly manufacturing various types of simple scrapers. About 90% of the bed G tool assemblage is made of vein quartz sourced from the river below. Macro-tools and hammerstones were commonly made with more durable limestone, more complex retouched tools with higher quality flint or quartzite, and bifaces with hornfel.

Evidence of fire is present in only the upper part of bed C, dating to roughly 400,000 years ago. Similarly, the archaeological record reports sparse and infrequent fire usage until around 400,000 years ago, which may correlate with the true domestication of fire and the invention of fire-starting technology, or simply better fire maintenance strategies.

=== Cannibalism ===
Some humans bones in beds G and F appear to have been cracked open while still fresh, or have striations consistent with skinning and butchering, which may attest to the practice of cannibalism. This could explain the conspicuous absence of chest and (by-and-large) hand and foot bones, which should have been left behind if these individuals had been eaten by animals. If this is correct, then the Tautavel inhabitants of bed G specifically consumed brains, tongues, and the flesh and bone marrow of the limbs of the recently deceased or killed. This would indicate ritual cannibalism as opposed to survival cannibalism; otherwise the butcherers would presumably have utilised the entire body rather than only certain sections.

== See also ==
- Ceprano Man
- Clactonian
- Dmanisi hominins
- European early modern humans
- Happisburgh footprints
- Homo antecessor
