= Arago Cave =

Cave and archaeological site in southern France

Coordinates: 42.839444°N 2.755000°E

- Caune de l'Arago
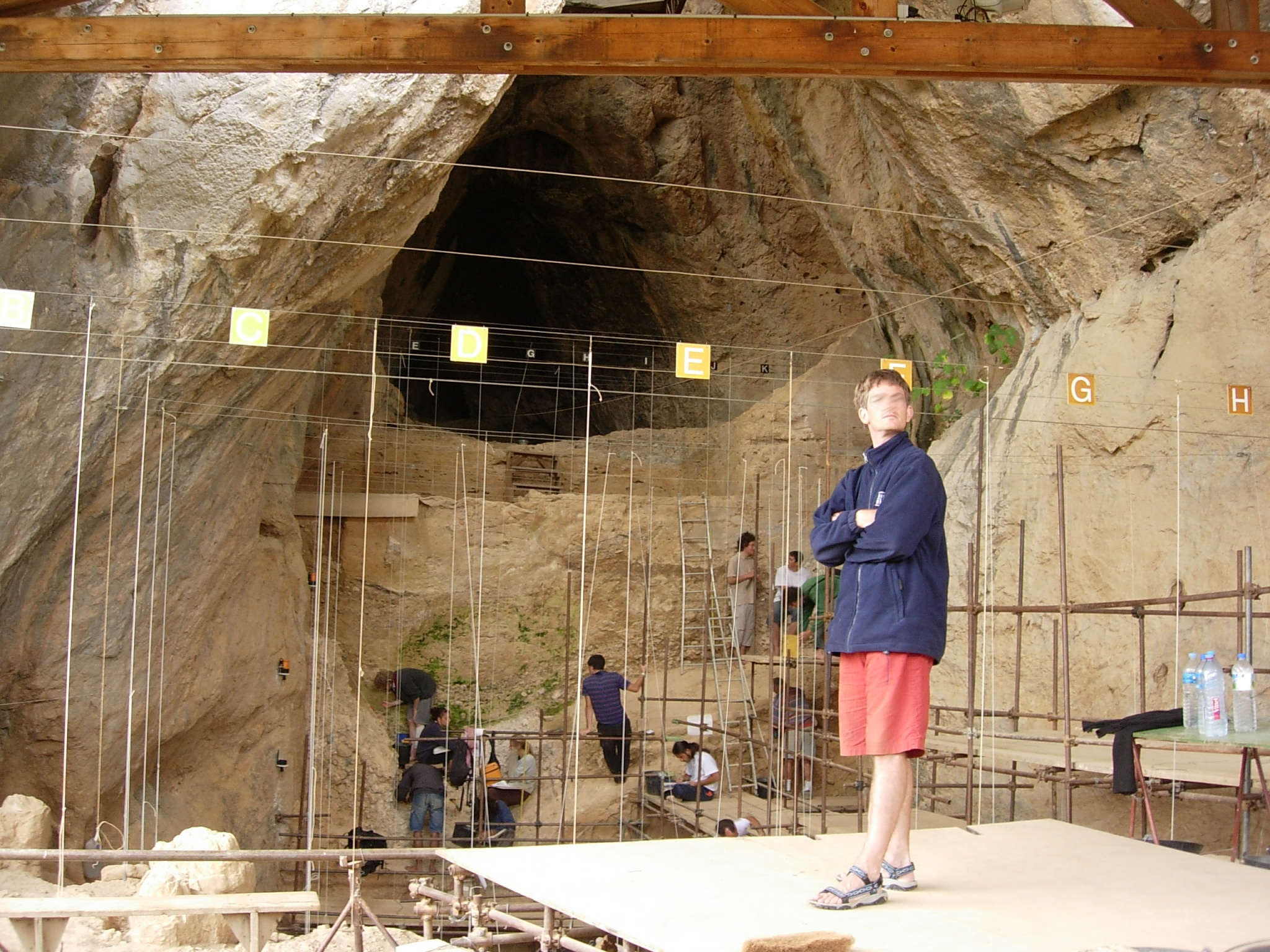
- Excavation at the cave

- Location within Occitanie Location within France
- Location: Occitanie (région administrative); Département des Pyrénées-Orientales; Massif des Corbières dans les pré-Pyrénées

Arago Cave is a prehistoric site in the community of Tautavel, in the department of Pyrénées-Orientales. It is a large cavity overlooking a perennial stream called the Verdouble. Human remains attributed to the Tautavel Man and the lithic remnants of the Lower Paleolithic were discovered in the cave.

== Location and description ==
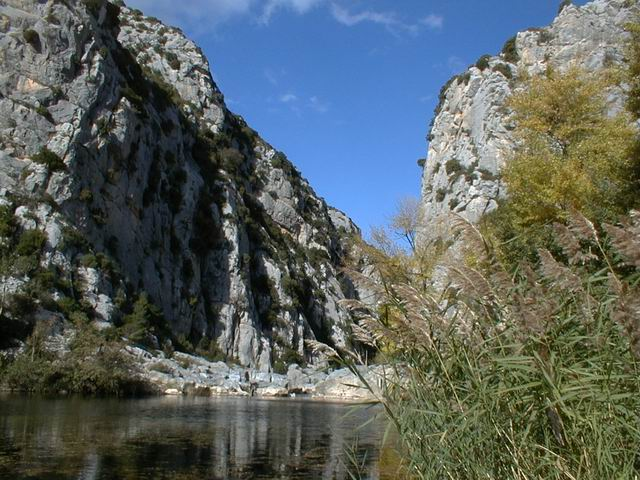
Arago Cave

Arago Cave is located in the southern part of France, at the eastern end of the Pyrénées, in the French department of Pyrénées-Orientales, in the town of Tautavel. Included in a limestone cliff of the Corbières Massif, it overlooks from a height of several tens of metres (80 m today, less than 60 at the time of Tautavel Man) a wide valley where the Verdouble stream leaves a canyon to meander onto the plain.

The cavern is thirty metres long, but could have measured up to a hundred and twenty metres during the prehistoric period. Its maximum width is 10 metres. It is currently open to the south but the opening faced east before the collapse.

This advantageous position made it a perfect shelter for prehistoric Hunter-gatherers. The eastern opening on a south facing cliff allowed relatively high temperatures during winter. The highly contrasted relief of this environment produced several ecological niches that provided many types of prey: animals adapted to the river (beavers). Others adapted to the plain, which was, according to successive periods and climates, covered with forest (deer) or steppe (horses, bison, rhinos, elephants), living herbivores on craggy grounds (mouflons, ibex, tahrs, chamois), and still others on uplands with more harsh climates (musk oxen, reindeer). In addition, under the cave, there was a ford where herds of large herbivores passed, facilitating hunting. The elevated position of the cave made it an excellent observatory for spotting herds on the plain. The nearby river (which never ran dry) provided water as well as pebbles to cover the soil of the cave or serve as tools. The distant environment, less than a half-day walk (about 30 km), could provide other stones to make tools: flint (in Roquefort-des-Corbières), red jasper (in Corneilla-de-Conflent), cherts (in Rivesaltes), quartzites (in Soulatgé), volcanic rocks (Col de Couisse).

== Scientific interest ==
Arago Cave has more than fifteen meters of sediment, rocks, and debris accumulated over a period of about 100,000 to 700,000 years. By their quantity (the period of excavations from 1967 to 1994 yielded about 260,000 objects including bones and lithic remains) and their diversity, these vestiges give much information on prehistoric human groups that lived there, but also on animals, plants, and climates that followed in the region during these 600,000 years.

On July 27, 2015, the Museum of Prehistory of Tautavel announced the discovery by young volunteer excavators of a tooth dating back 550,000 years on the site. This fossil tooth is 100,000 years older than the skull of the Man of Tautavel.

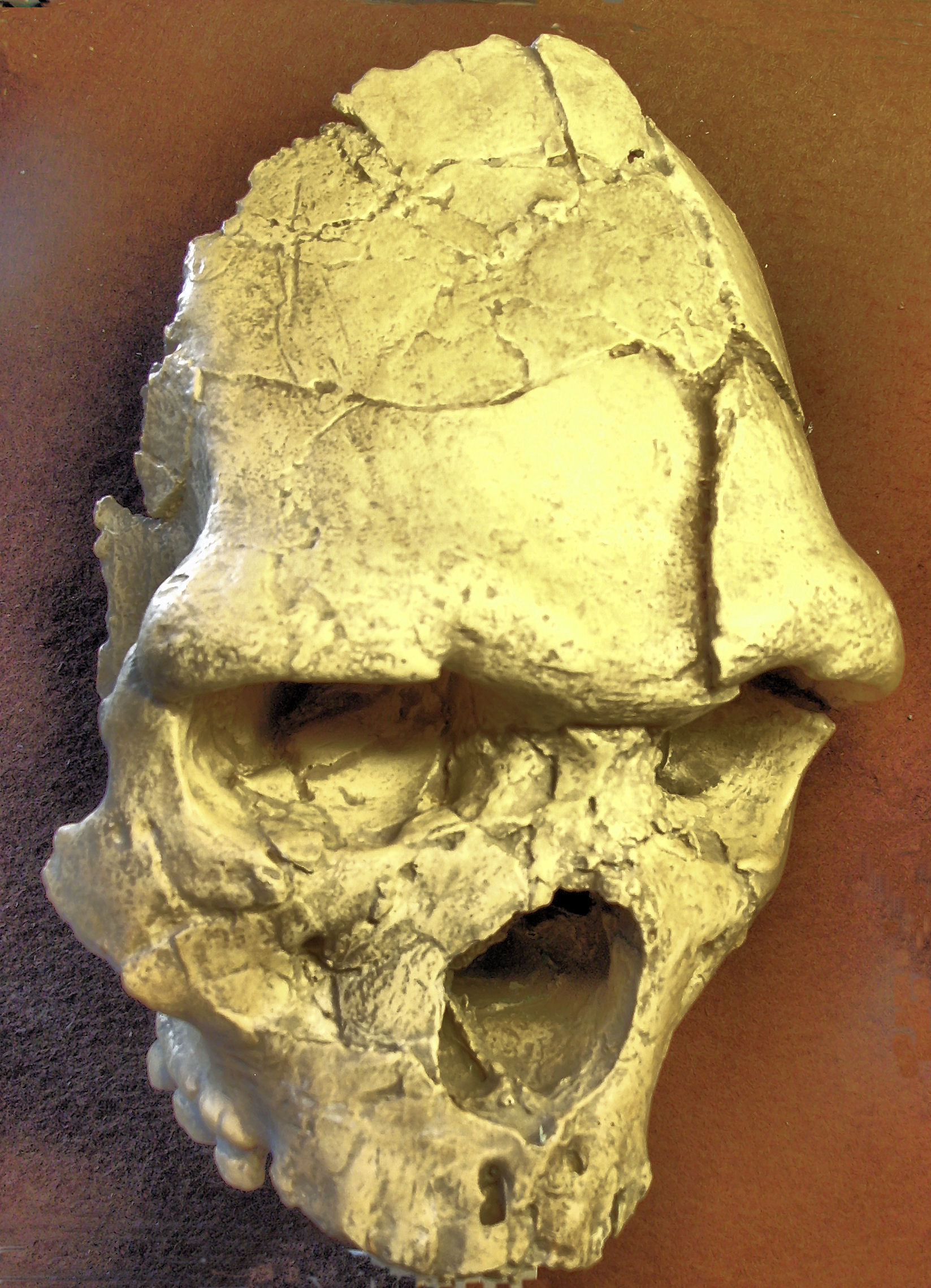
Arago 21

=== Tautavel Man ===
Tautavel Man (Homo erectus tautavelensis) is a proposed subspecies of Homo erectus, the type specimen being 450,000-year-old fossil remains discovered in the Arago Cave.

=== Fauna and flora ===
The remains of a large and varied fauna have been found in the Arago Cave, with 122 different species represented. Many remains of mammal species testify to the feeding of humans at different times. A slender horse (Equus mosbachensis tautavelensis) seems to have been the main prey during the Tautavel man's days (level G), with bison (Bison priscus) also found in large numbers at the same time. The excavations also revealed numerous remains of reindeer (Rangifer tarandus), deer (Cervus elaphus), fallow deer (Dama sp.), Musk oxen (Praeovibos priscus), moufflons (Ovis ammon), tahrs (Hemitragus bonali). ) and rhino (Dicerorhinus hemitoechus) and remains of Deninger bears (Ursus deningeri).

== Excavation history ==
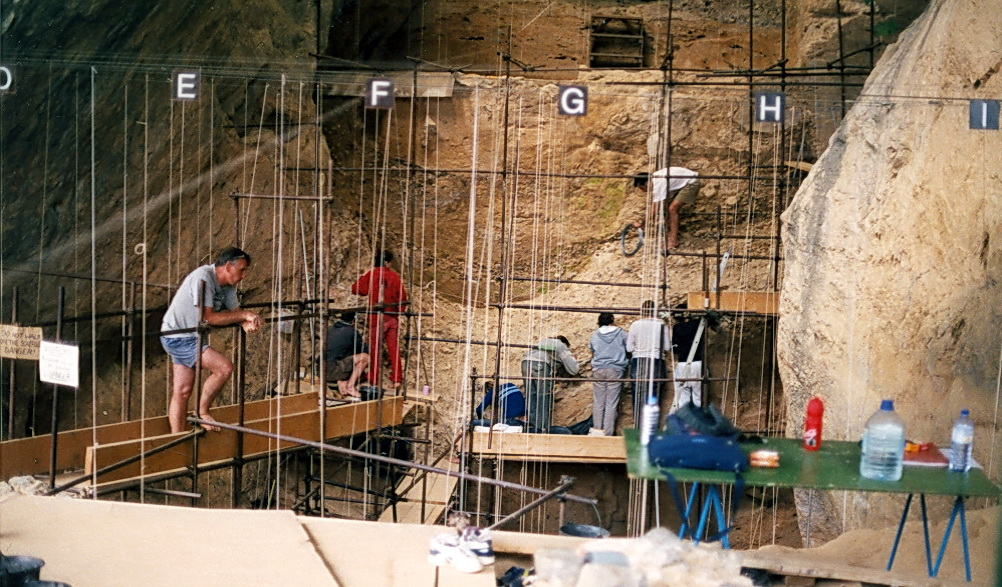
Excavation session

Known since the middle of the nineteenth century for the remains of animals, Arago Cave began to yield evidence of prehistoric industry to J. Abelanet in 1948. In the 1950s, the brothers Ribes de Maury and Raymond Gabas of Saint-Paul-de-Fenouillet were among the first to perform excavations, as amateur archaeologists. They collaborated with J. Abelanet and their findings helped realize the importance and richness of the site.

Systematic excavation campaigns, led by Henry de Lumley, have been conducted every year since April 1964. The first annual campaigns (in 1964, 1965 and 1966) lasted two weeks. The following ones, from 1967 to 1978, one month, then three months (from 1979 to 1991) and, since 1992, five months. The Arago cave was listed as a historic monument in April 1965.

== Stratigraphy and chronology ==
Its powerful filling, about ten meters thick, covers most of the Middle Pleistocene and has been the subject of numerous attempts at radiometric dating that are sometimes contradictory. Limit ages of about 700 and 350 000 years were obtained by uranium-thorium dating for stalagmitic floors at the base (floor 0) and at the top (floor α) of the stratigraphic sequence, respectively.

== Set 3 ==
The main archaeological levels are found in the third set (soils levels D to G) and would be between 300 and 450 000 years old. This ensemble also delivered a number of human fossils, including an incomplete skull (face, frontal and parietal right) (Arago XXI, G soil) and two mandibles (Arago II, G soil and Arago XIII, soil F) attributed to the man of Tautavel. Discoveries from the oldest layers of set III have been described as ancient Tayacian or "Tautavélien". They are made mainly of quartz, more rarely flint and quartzite, and include scrapers, many notched tools (denticulate, notches, Tayac spikes, beaks, etc.), pebbles cut and rare bifaces (less than 1 for 1000 tools). At the top of the set III (layer E), the bifaces are proportionally more, which led Henry de Lumley to link the industry to the average Acheulean.

However, these differences should be tempered because the numbers of bifaces are very small in levels G to D, and where the proportions between major technological classes slightly vary, whether we consider the whole industry or only the tooling. The materials used are mostly local (80%) and were taken from the alluvial deposits of Verdouble, but some came from areas 30 km far north-east and southwest of the site, reflecting a good knowledge of the regional resources and an anticipation of needs.
