= Barranco León =

Archaeological site in Andalusia, Spain

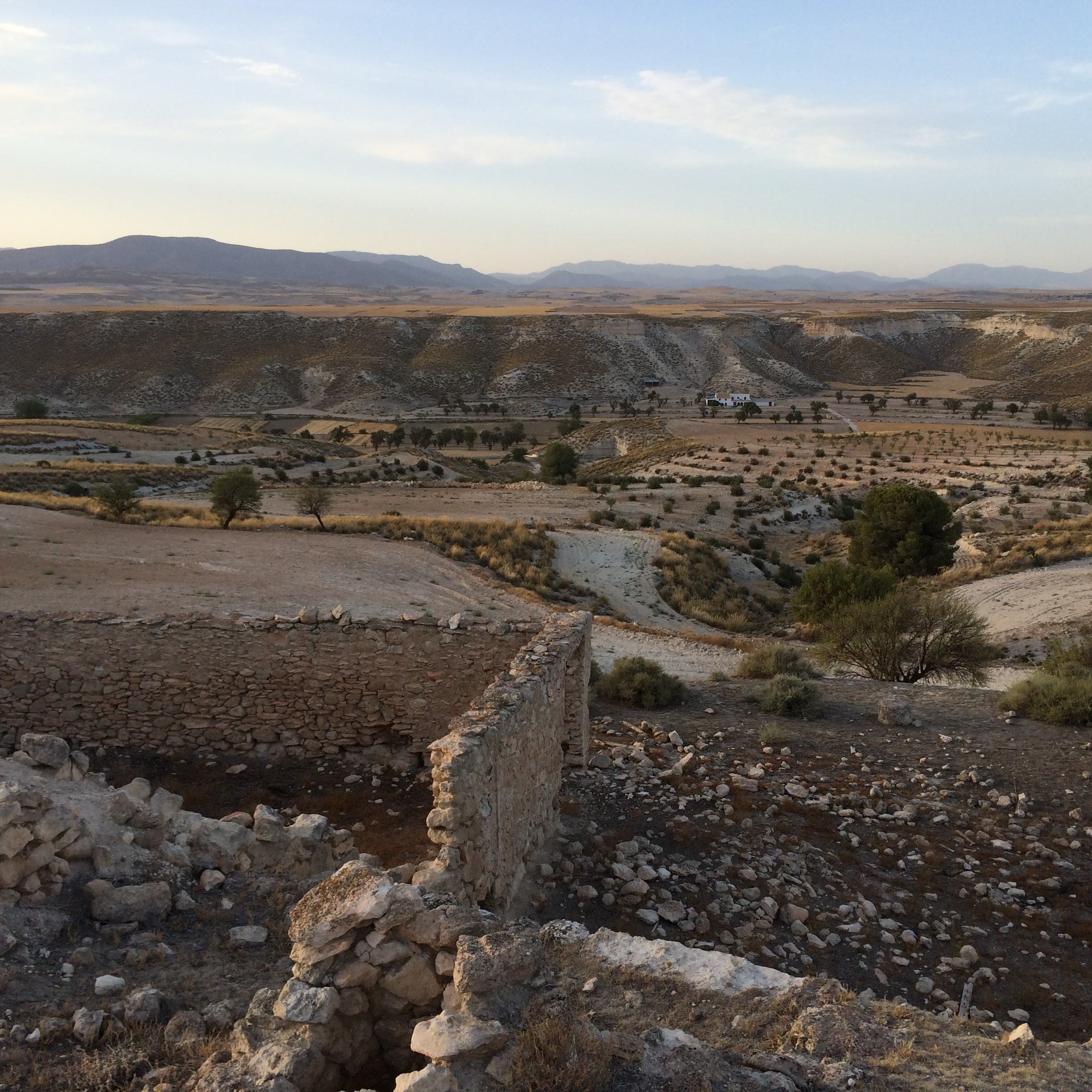
- Interactive map of Barranco León
- 37°43′26.5620″N 02°27′02.8230″W
- Type: Archaeological site
- Periods: Pleistocene
- Cultures: Oldowan
- Location: Orce
- Region: Province of Granada

History
- Archaeologists: Josep Gibert i Clols; Martínez Fernández y Toro
- Excavation dates: 1995; 1999-2000

Barranco León is an archaeological site in Orce, Andalusia, Spain with an age range between 1.2 and 1.4 million of years. It is noted for having yielded evidence of hominin occupation, including the milk tooth of a boy or girl of 10 years. After the tooth had been dated, its original owner (the "child of Orce") was hailed as having left the earliest anatomical evidence for humans in Western Europe.

The site was excavated in 1995 by Josep Gibert i Clols and between 1999 and 2000 by Martínez Fernández y Toro.

== Animals ==
Now situated in an arid area of Spain, the site was once at the edge of a lake. Among the large mammals were found Hippopotamus antiquus, Equus altidens, Felidae cf. Homotherium sp., Megaloceros sp. and Bovini gen. et indet.

== Humans ==
Apart from the tooth, other finds from Orce have been posited as early human remains, but their status has not been confirmed.

=== Stone Tools ===
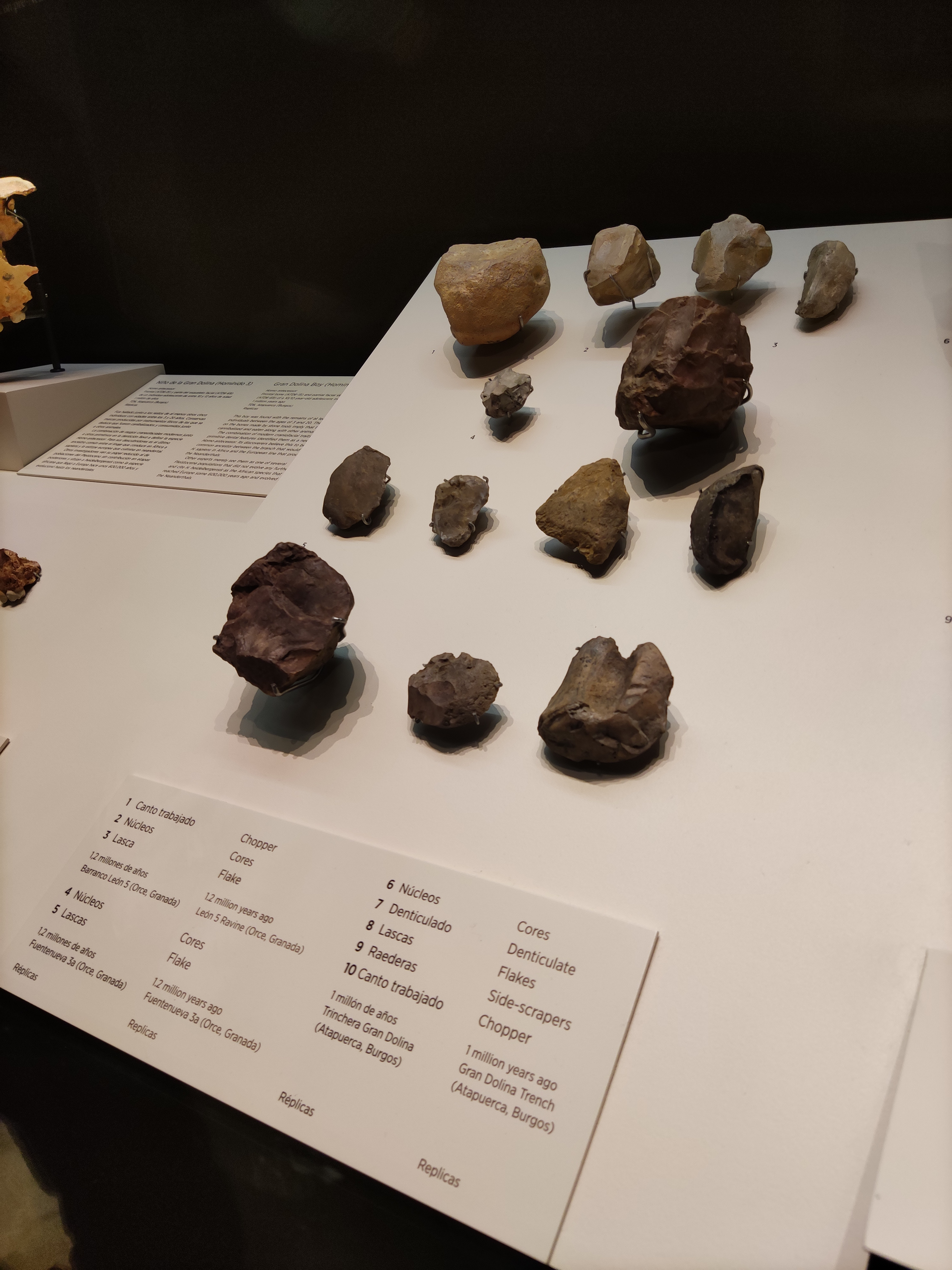
Stone tools on display

The lithic industry assemblage found at the site is from the Oldowan, and consists of more than 1000 artefacts (including waste flakes). Spiral or helical fractures, impact points, flake scars, and bone flakes were discovered on megafaunal remains and are associated with the tools.

== Conservation ==
The Instituto Geológico y Minero de España in collaboration with the Spanish Geological Society (Sociedad Geológica de España) has drawn up a list of internationally important geosites in Spain. These geosites are known in Spain as LIGs. Barranco Leon is listed as AND331, a separate reference from the global geosite one, VP016. Barranco Leon is listed primarily for its paleontological interest with regard to vertebrates ("Yacimientos de vertebrados del Plioceno y Pleistoceno españoles"), although the stratigraphy is also of interest.

=== Access ===
The exact location of the geosite is confidential. However, tourism is encouraged at Orce. Material from Barranco Leon is on display at the local museum. Also, the Granada Geopark has promoted Orce in the context of geotourism. It is on a trekking route, the "First Settlers Great Path", which starts and finishes at Huéscar.
