= Henry de Lumley =

French archeologist, geologist and prehistorian

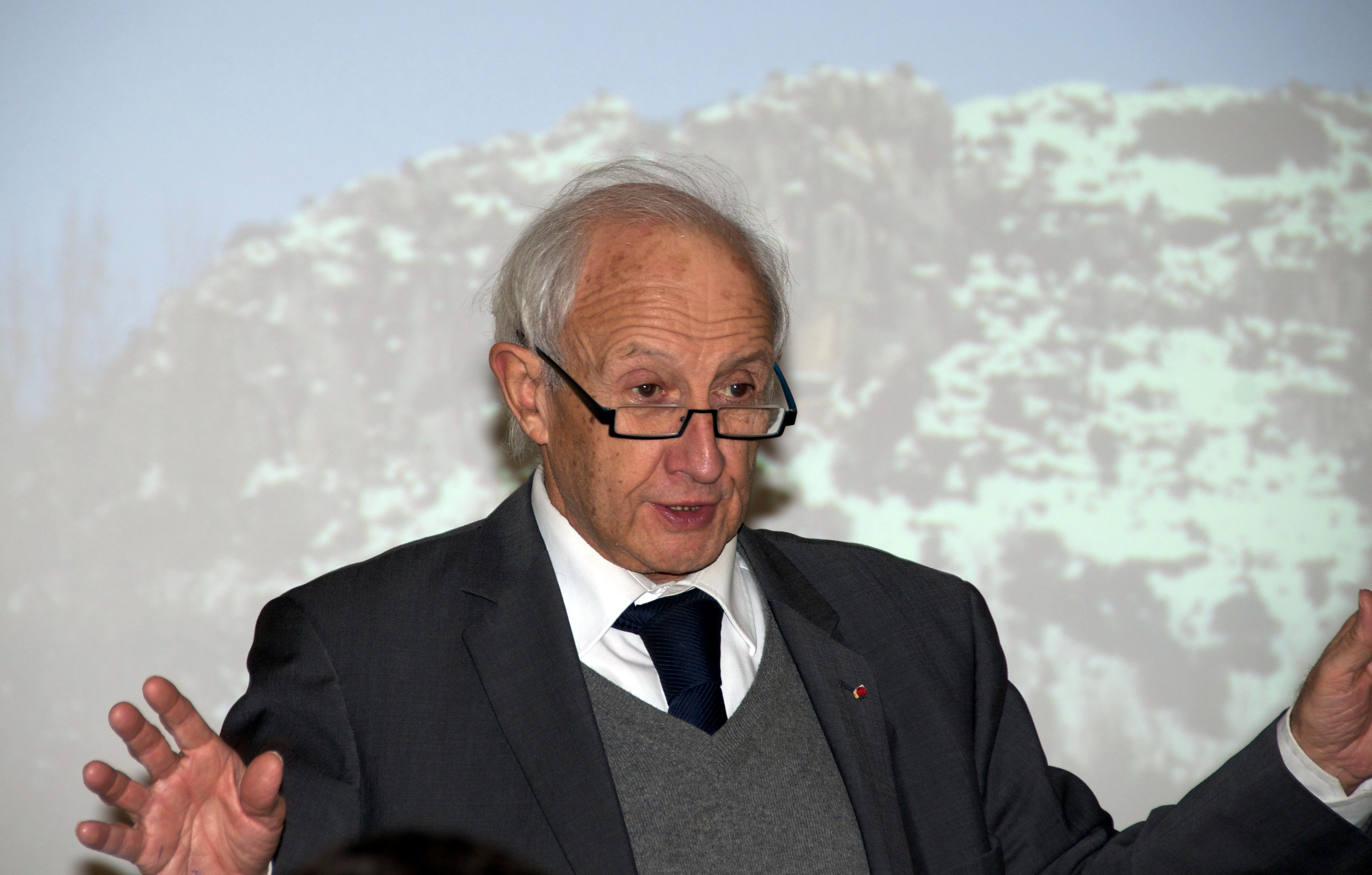
- de Lumley in February 2012
- Born: Henry de Lumley-Woodyear; August 14, 1934 (age 92); Marseille, France
- Known for: Discoveries at Terra Amata, Grotte du Lazaret, and Caune de l'Arago
- Spouse: Marie-Antoinette de Lumley
- Awards: Grand Officer of the Légion d'honneur, Grand Officer of the Ordre national du Mérite, Commander of the Order of Cultural Merit (Monaco)

Academic background
- Education: University of Provence
- Thesis: (1965)

Henry de Lumley (born 14 August 1934 in Marseille, France) is a French archeologist, geologist and prehistorian. He is director of the Institute of Human Paleontology in Paris, and Professor Emeritus at the National Museum of Natural History in Paris. He is also a corresponding member of the Academy of Humanities of the Institute of France and former director of the French National Museum of Natural History. He is best known for his work on archeological sites in France and Spain, notably Arago cave in Tautavel, Southern France, Terra Amata in Nice and Grotte du Lazaret near Nice, and Baume Bonne at Quinson, where some of the earliest evidence of man in Europe were found.

== Publications (in French) ==
- 1957 - "Les industrie à micro-lithes géométriques" with Max Escalon de Fonton, in: Bull S.P.F.LIV n°3-4.
- 1969 - "Le Paléolithique inférieur et moyen du Midi méditerranéen dans son cadre géologique", V^{e} supplément à Gallia préhistoire.
- 1969 - "Une cabane acheuléenne dans la Grotte du Lazaret", Mémoires de la Société préhistorique française, volume 7.
- 1972 - "La grotte moustérienne de l'Hortus (Valflaunès, Hérault)", Université de Provence, Études quaternaires, mémoire n° 1.
- 1976 - "La Préhistoire française. [Les] Civilisations paléolithiques et mésolithiques de la France ", Éditions du C.N.R.S.
- 1992 - "Le Mont Bégo", Imprimerie nationale.
- 1995 - "Le grandiose et le sacré", Edisud.
- 1998 - " L'Homme premier", Éditions Odile Jacob, rééd. 2009.
- 1999 - "Trésors méconnus du Musée de l'homme. Dans le secret des objets et des mondes", Éd. Le Cherche-midi, Paris.
- 2004 - "La Géorgie, berceau des Européens", éd. Musée de la préhistoire des Gorges du Verdon.
- 2004 - "Le sol d'occupation acheuléen de l'unité archéostratigraphique UA 25 de la grotte du Lazaret, Nice, Alpes-Maritimes, Edisud.
- 2005 - "La Grotte du Lazaret, un campement de chasseurs il y a 160 000 ans", Edisud.
- 2006 - "Il y a 400 000 ans : le feu, un formidable facteur d’hominisation", Comptes rendus Palevol.
- 2009 - "La grande histoire des premiers hommes européens", Odile Jacob. (ISBN 978 2 7381 2386 2)
- 2010 - "Terra Amata", CNRS Editions.

== Honours ==
- France: Grand officer of the National Order of Merit (2006)
- Monaco: Commander of the Order of Cultural Merit (2011)
- France: Grand officer of the Légion d'honneur (2010)
