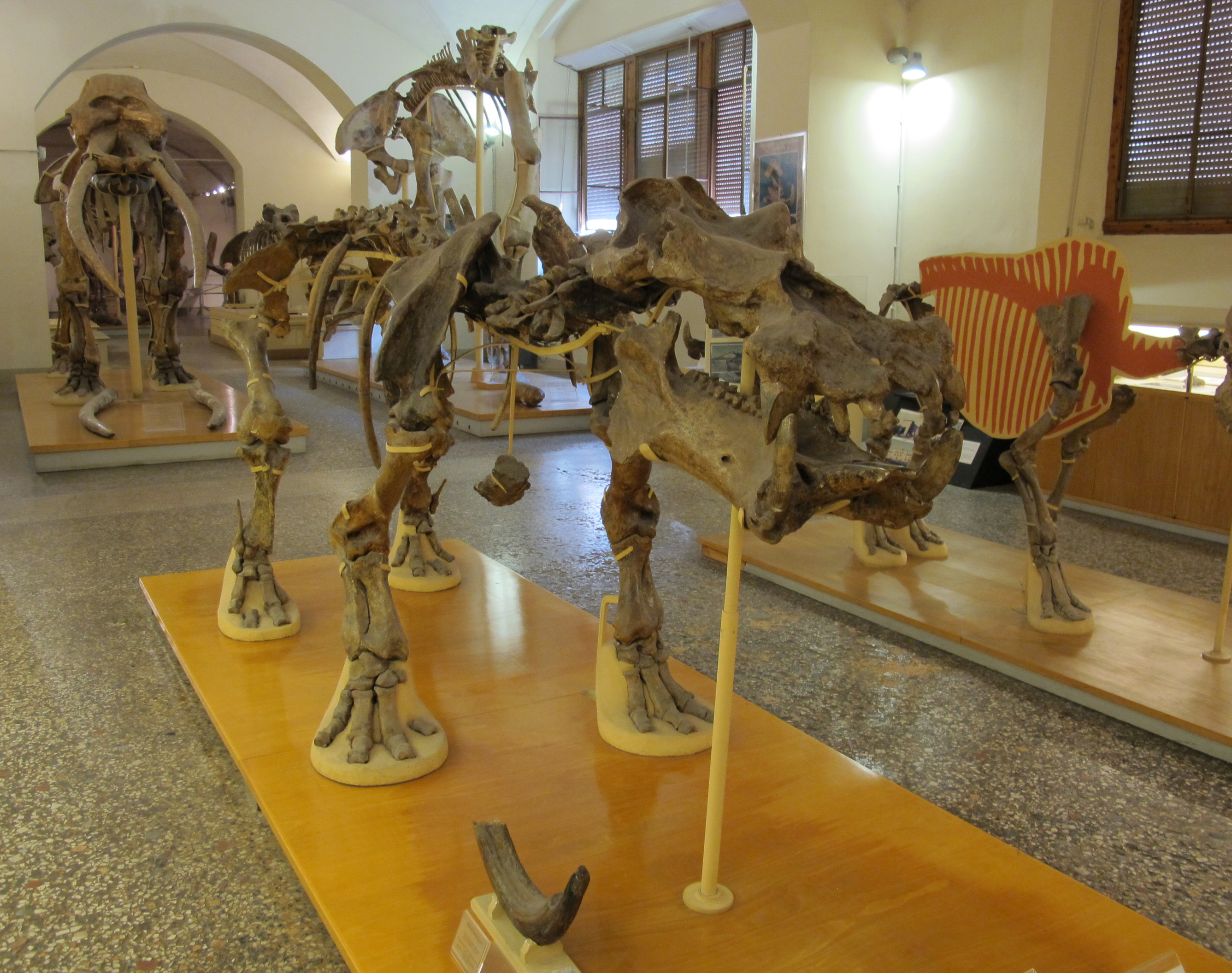
- Hippopotamus antiquus in Florence Palaeontology museum

Scientific classification
- Kingdom: Animalia
- Phylum: Chordata
- Class: Mammalia
- Order: Artiodactyla
- Family: Hippopotamidae
- Genus: Hippopotamus
- Species: †H. antiquus

Binomial name
- †Hippopotamus antiquus Desmarest 1822

Synonyms
- Hippopotamus amphibius antiquus; Hippopotamus georgicus; Hippopotamus major Cuvier, 1824; Hippopotamus tiberinus Mazza, 1991; ? Hippopotamus gorgops Dietrich, 1929; ?Hippopotamus behemoth Faure, 1986

= Hippopotamus antiquus =

Hippopotamus antiquus Temporal range: Early Pleistocene-Middle Pleistocene 2.1–0.4 Ma

Extinct species of Hippopotamus from the Pleistocene of Europe

Hippopotamus antiquus is an extinct species of the genus Hippopotamus that ranged across Europe and parts of West Asia during the Early and Middle Pleistocene (from around 2.1 million to 400,000 years ago). It was considerably larger than the living hippopotamus (Hippopotamus amphibius), which replaced H. antiquus in Europe following its extinction.

== Taxonomy ==
Hippopotamus antiquus was erected in 1822 by French paleontologist Anselme Gaëtan Desmarest, based on remains collected from the Upper Valdarno region of Tuscany in northern Italy. The lectotype specimen is IGF 1043, a largely complete skeleton collected from the Upper Valdarno, which is on display at the Natural History Museum of the University of Florence and first described in 1820 by Italian paleontologist Filippo Nesti, who served as the museum's curator and had collected the specimen some time prior, though it is unclear whether the skeleton is of a single animal or a composite of multiple individuals. The taxonomy of European Pleistocene hippopotamuses was historically confused, with several named species now being generally recognised as synonyms of H. antiquus, including H. major, erected by Georges Cuvier in 1824 for relatively large Early-Middle Pleistocene hippopotamuses, and Hippopotamus tibernius, named by P. Mazza in 1991 for relatively small Middle Pleistocene specimens.

== Evolution ==
H. antiquus is suggested to be closely related to the African species Hippopotamus gorgops, and may be a descendant of that species. The oldest records of H. antiquus date to the Early Pleistocene, around 2.1-2 million years ago, which are found in Italy and Greece. The earliest specimens in the Iberian Peninsula date to around 1.7 million years ago. H. antiquus first became widespread north of the Alps around 1.1 to 1 million years ago, as evidenced from specimens found dating to this time in France, Germany, the Netherlands and southern Britain. The youngest remains of the species are from Condeixa in Portugal, suggested to date to approximately 400,000 years ago, and Malagrotta in central Italy, dating to 450-380,000 years ago. Later records of the genus Hippopotamus in Europe are believed to belong to the modern hippopotamus (Hippopotamus amphibius). The earliest generally accepted record of H. amphibius in Europe is around 500,000 years old, and it is therefore possible that H. antiquus and H. amphibius coexisted in Europe from 500-400,000 years ago, though this is uncertain.

The Cretan dwarf hippopotamus (H. creutzburgi) is believed to have evolved from H. antiquus through the process of insular dwarfism on the island of Crete. The extinct Cyprus dwarf hippopotamus (H. minor) may also derive from H. antiquus, but this is uncertain.

== Description ==
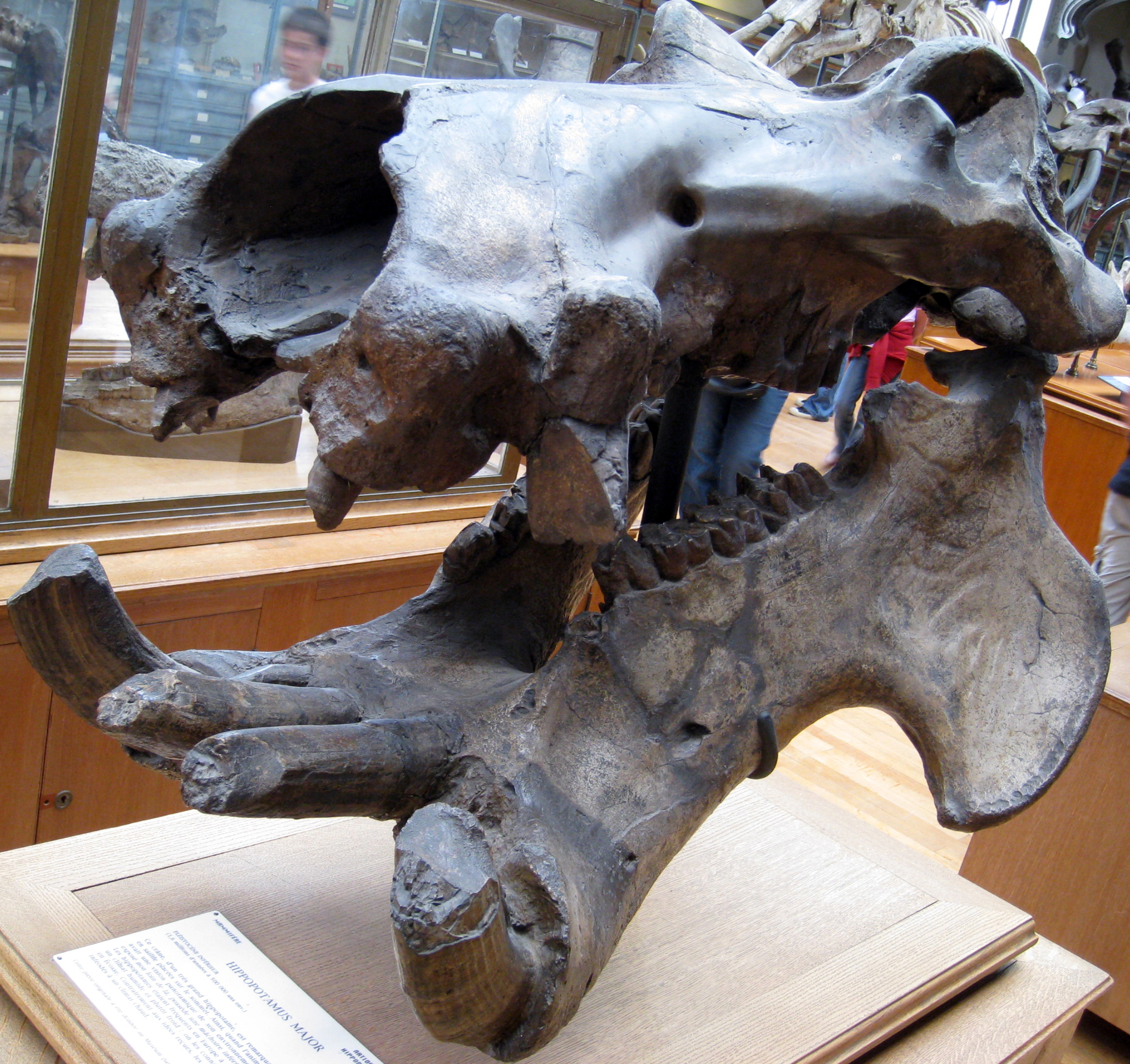
Skull in Muséum national d'histoire naturelle, Paris

H. antiquus was the largest species within the genus Hippopotamus. Regression analyses based on bone dimensions have variously suggested body mass ranges for H. antiquus individuals spanning from around 1,600 to 4,700 kilograms (3,500 to 10,400 lb), however, the accuracy of these estimates have been questioned, with it possible for regression estimates to seriously both under and overestimate body mass. Volumetric estimates based on creating 3D models from mounted skeletons, which are thought to be more accurate, suggests a body mass of around 3,174 kilograms (6,997 lb) for the lectotype IGF 1043 skeleton of H. antiquus on display at the Natural History Museum of the University of Florence, around double the weight of the average specimen of the living common hippopotamus (H. amphibius). The species exhibited size variability, with individuals from the late Early Pleistocene and Middle Pleistocene (from around 1.2-1 million years ago onwards) being smaller on average than those from earlier in the Early Pleistocene, and more comparable in size with H. amphibius. The size of H. antiquus likely varied to due factors such as climate (including temperature and precipitation) and food availability. There is also variation due to sexual dimorphism, including in the shape of the lower jaw and the size of the canines.

In comparison to modern Hippopotamus amphibius, the skull is more slender and elongate, but with a shorter neurocranium. The zygomatic arches also expand less laterally outwards to the side of the skull than in H. amphibius, and there is a natural gap (diastema) between the second and third premolars. The skull also has more elevated eyesockets and the feet have shorter metapodial bones than H. amphibius.

== Distribution and habitat ==
H. antiquus ranged across Western Europe and parts of central Europe, from the Iberian Peninsula and Italian Peninsula in the south, as far north as France, England, the Netherlands, Germany and Hungary. In southeastern Europe, the record of H. antiquus is primarily confined to Greece. Some records are also known from West Asia, including several from western Anatolia in modern Turkey, and at the Akhalkalaki site in Georgia in the southern Caucasus, the latter representing the easternmost record of the species, which were originally assigned to the separate species H. georgicus. Remains possibly attributable to the species are also known from the Ubeidiya site in Israel, though other authors assign these remains to the species H. behemoth. Their distribution was strongly controlled by temperature, with the species only extending to the northern parts of Europe during warmer interglacial intervals.

== Palaeoecology ==
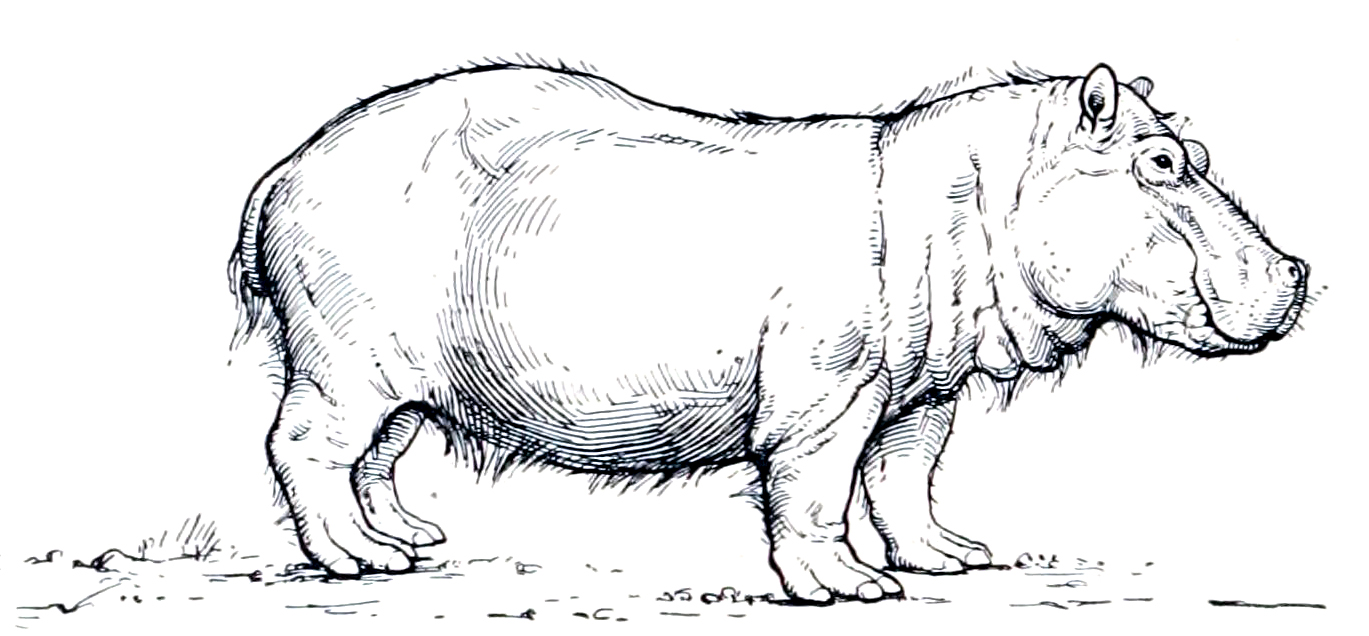
Life restoration by Erwin S. Christman, 1916

The morphology of Hippopotamus antiquus suggests that it spent even more time in the water and it may have been less suited to terrestrial locomotion than the living H. amphibius. An analysis of nitrogen isotopes suggests that H. antiquus preferred aquatic plants, in contrast to modern H. amphibius, which prefers terrestrial grasses. Late H. antiquus may have consumed a greater proportion of herbaceous plants than earlier H. antiquus populations. Due to its large body size and amphibious ecology, adults were largely immune from predation, though juveniles may have occasionally been targeted by predators, such as the sabertooth cat Homotherium. Other large animals that lived alongside Hippopotamus antiquus Early-Middle Pleistocene Europe include rhinoceroses belonging to the genus Stephanorhinus, as well as the mammoth Mammuthus meridionalis, which was replaced at the beginning of the Middle Pleistocene by the straight-tusked elephant (Palaeoloxodon antiquus).

== Relationship with humans ==
Remains of the species with cut marks suggestive of butchery by archaic humans have been reported from several sites in Spain, dating to the late Early Pleistocene, including Barranco León (~1.4 Ma), Fuente Nueva 3 (~1.3 Ma), and Vallparadís (~1.0 Ma). At the Marathousa 2 site in Greece, thought to date to the Middle Pleistocene around 500-400,000 years ago, remains of a juvenile Hippopotamus antiquus individual with cut marks were found associated with a lithic artefact. It is unclear whether the remains at these sites were hunted or scavenged. It is unlikely that archaic humans regularly hunted healthy adult hippopotamuses due to their dangerousness.
