= Terra Amata (archaeological site) =

Archaeological site in France

Coordinates: 43°41′52″N 7°17′22″E

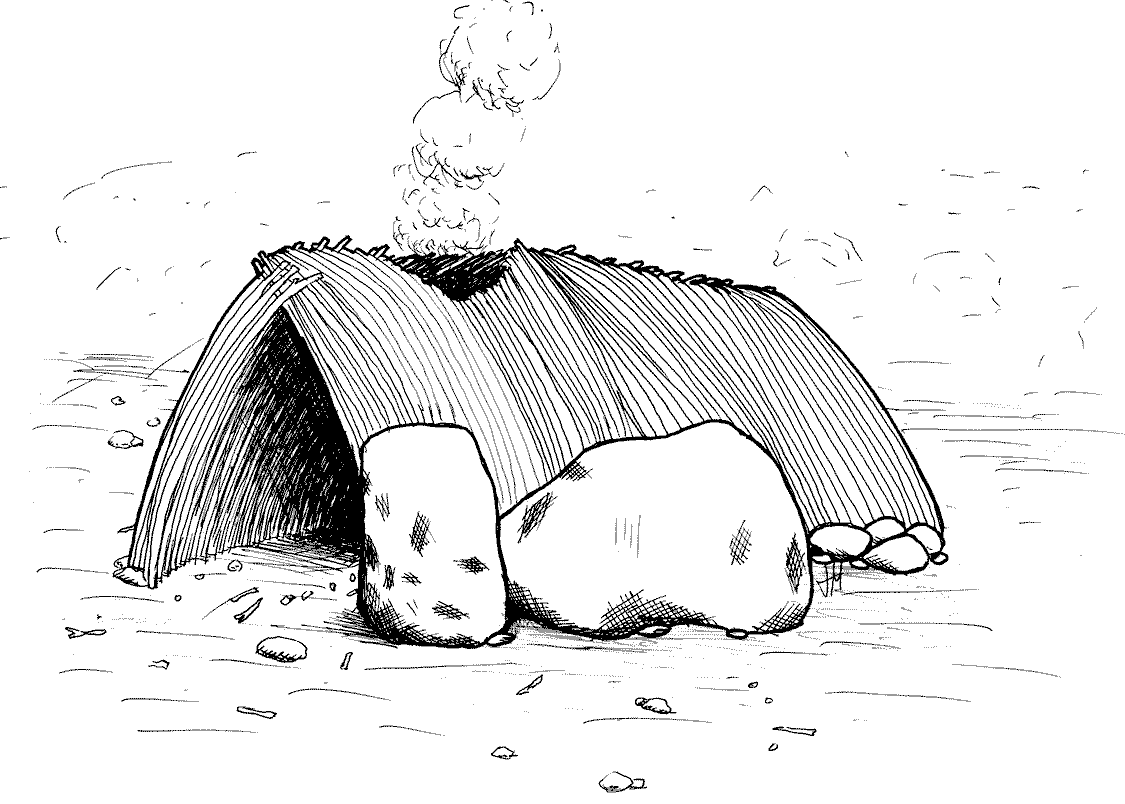
Depiction of a Terra Amata hut as postulated by H. de Lumley (see text)

Terra Amata (Italian for "Beloved Land") is an archaeological site in open air located on the slopes of Mount Boron in Nice, France at a level 26 meters (85 ft) above the current sea level of the Mediterranean. It was discovered and excavated in 1966 by Henry de Lumley. The site, originally on a prehistoric beach, contained tools of the Lower Paleolithic period, dated to about 400,000 BCE, as well as traces of some of the earliest domestication of fire in Europe. The site now lies beneath an apartment building and a museum of prehistoric Nice, where some of the objects discovered are on display.

== Principal discoveries ==
The site was discovered during the construction of a terrace near the port of Nice in 1966. After negotiating with the owner of the site, DeLumley was given permission to work on the site from January 28 until July 5, 1966. He and his team worked seven days a week, and, at the end, twenty-four hours a day, to complete their work.

According to de Lumley, the site contained a settlement with several layers of habitation located on a fossil beach. The habitations dated to 380,000 BC, and included vestiges which suggested that the inhabitants lived in huts on the beach. In the center of each hut was a fireplace, with ashes showing that the inhabitants had domesticated fire. These signs of fire, along with those at Menez Dregan in the Finistère in France, at Beeches Pit in Suffolk, England, and at Vertesszollos in Hungary, are the earliest evidence of the domestication of fire known in Europe. These vestiges included low walls of stones and beach pebbles, placed to the northwest of the fireplaces, which would have sheltered the fire from the strong Mistral wind. De Lumley believed the inhabitants built the huts of animal skins supported by poles, with a hole in the center for the smoke to escape. Twenty to forty people could gather in such a shelter. If his theory is correct, Terra Amata is one of the first discoveries of man-made human habitations in Europe.

The site also included evidence that the inhabitants had manufactured tools out of the beach stones, including tools with two cutting faces and a particular kind of stone pick which was given the name '"Pics de Terra Amata." They also discovered a large number of stone tools and scrapers in the dunes above the beach.

== Controversy ==
A very different interpretation of the site was given later by another archeologist, Paola Villa, who dedicated part of her doctoral thesis to the same site. She argued that the conclusions reached by De Lumley were more conjectural than compelling. She said it was equally likely that the stones were naturally deposited through stream flow, soil creep or some other natural process.

Villa also argued that stone artifacts from the different proposed living floors can be fitted together, showing that artifacts have moved up and down through the sediment column. Thus, the supposed living floor assemblages are most likely mixtures of artifacts from different time periods that have come to rest at particular levels. There was, she said, therefore compelling evidence that the site was subjected to relatively invasive post-depositional processes, which may also be responsible for the stone 'arrangements'.

Villa argued that de Lumley had greatly overestimated the state of preservation of the original site, and that it was impossible to accurately date the objects because the layers could not be considered independent of each other. She also said, that the site should be dated later than 380,000 BCE to approximately 230,000 BCE.
