= Venta Micena =

Coordinates: 37°43′54″N 2°23′21″W

Venta Micena is a locality in the municipio of Orce in the Province of Granada, Spain.

It is known for a paleontological site (one of a number in the Granada Geopark) which has yielded animal remains dated to between 1.5 and 1.6 million years ago. The animals lived in a habitat where there was a large lake in an endorheic basin, although the area is now arid.
