= Marie-Antoinette de Lumley =

French anthropologist (born 1934)

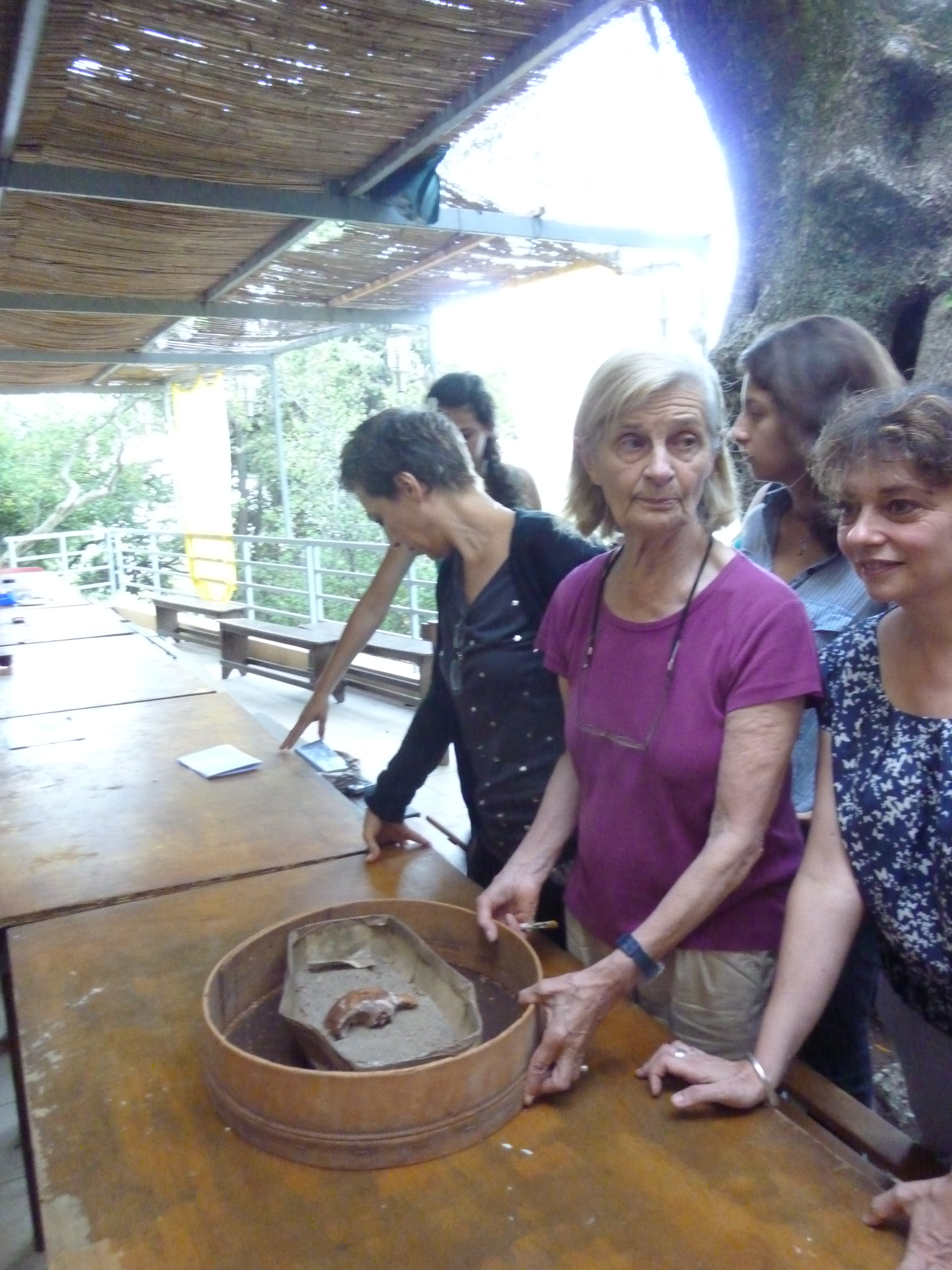
- de Lumley in 2011
- Born: September 11, 1934 (age 92)
- Spouse: Henry de Lumley
- Awards: Legion of Honour

Academic background
- Education: Pierre and Marie Curie University (PhD)

Marie-Antoinette de Lumley (née de Reyher; born September 11, 1934), is a French prehistorian, paleoanthropologist, and Emeritus CNRS Research Director, known her research on the first inhabitants of Europe with her husband Henry de Lumley.

She was the discoverer of the Tautavel Man in 1971 accompanied by her husband and their team.

She is a member of the Institut de paléontologie humaine (IPH). On July 6, 1996, she was awarded the Legion of Honour.
