= Grotte du Lazaret =

Cave and archaeological site in southern France

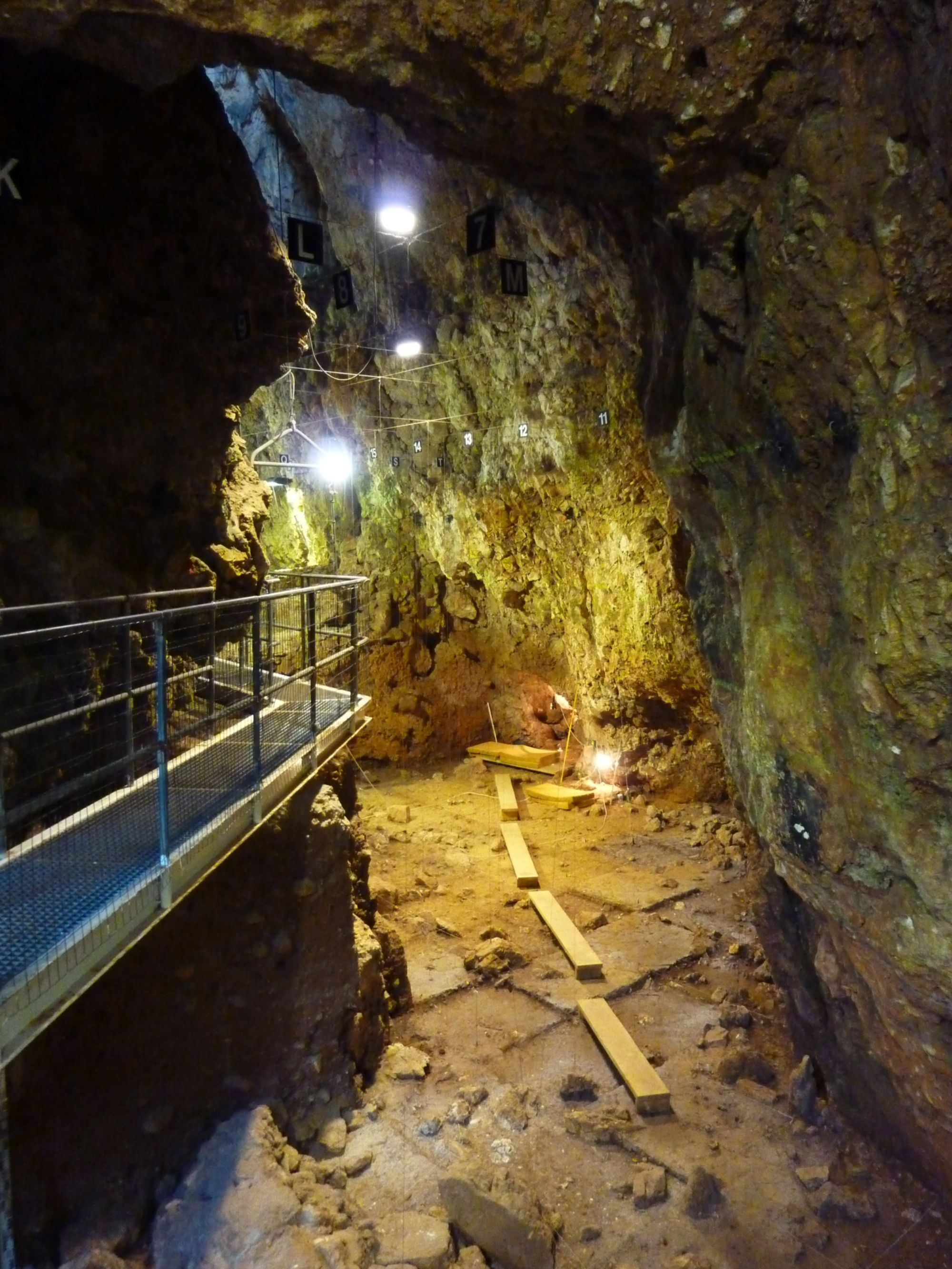

- location in France Grotte du Lazaret (France)
- 43°41′24″N 7°17′24″E
- Location: Nice town
- Region: Alpes-Maritimes Department, France

Site notes
- Excavation dates: 1962

The Grotte du Lazaret (English: Cave of Le Lazaret) is an archaeological cave site of prehistoric human occupation study, situated in the eastern suburbs of the French town of Nice, overlooking the Mediterranean Sea. Results of excavations have been interpreted as to account for the construction of shelters by humans during the Lower Paleolithic period. Research teams have unearthed more than 20,000 fossilized faunal bone fragments.

Two hundred thousand year old cranial fragments of a nine year old juvenile found in the cave suggest the presence of either Homo heidelbergensis or a proto-Neanderthal human.

== The possible shelter ==
Occupation layers of the cave in use during marine isotopic stage 6 (186,000 to 127,000 years ago) were excavated during the 1970s and may demonstrate construction abilities and other organisational skills by the inhabitants at the time.

Close to the mouth of the cave and along one wall were found Acheulean stone tools along with fragments of animal bone surrounding two circular charcoal concentrations which likely served as hearths. This occupation area measures 11 by 3.5 m (36 by 11 ft) and was delimited by the cave wall on three sides and on the fourth by a sinuous line of large stones. It is these which have been interpreted as having served as packing stones that could have been used to support the poles of an animal skin tent pitched against the cave wall. No evidence of the organic tent poles or tent itself would have survived but stone tool flakes and animal bone appear to spill outwards from between the stones at two points which may represent entrances to the conjectured shelter.

Finds of tiny sea shells surrounding the hearths may represent seaweed brought into the cave to serve as bedding. This may indicate specialised activity areas within the settlement with an inner domestic area and an outer one which would have been covered by the tent but presumably used for another purpose.

It is by no means certain that the stones were brought into the cave and placed by people however and natural processes or a reason for their placement not involving a structure may explain their presence. The limited evidence from nearby sites where similar stone tools and other cultural material have been found close to concentrations of natural rocks is less compelling than at Le Lazaret. Examples of these similar sites include La Baume Bonne (in Quinson, Alpes-de-Haute-Provence) and Orgnac. The evidence for housing in the archaeological record prior to the arrival of modern humans 50,000 years ago is slim, although any flimsy structure built prior to this time is unlikely to leave unmistakable archaeological traces after so long.

== Bibliography ==
- Scarre, C (ed.) (2005). The Human Past, London: Thames and Hudson. ISBN 0-500-28531-4.

== Footnotes ==
1. De Lumley, 1975, Cultural evolution in France in its palaeoecological setting during the middle Pleistocene, in After the Australopithecines, Butzer, KW and Isaac, G Ll. (eds) 745—808. The Hague:Mouton, qtd in Scarre, 2005
