= Tautavel =

Tautavel Talteüll
- Commune
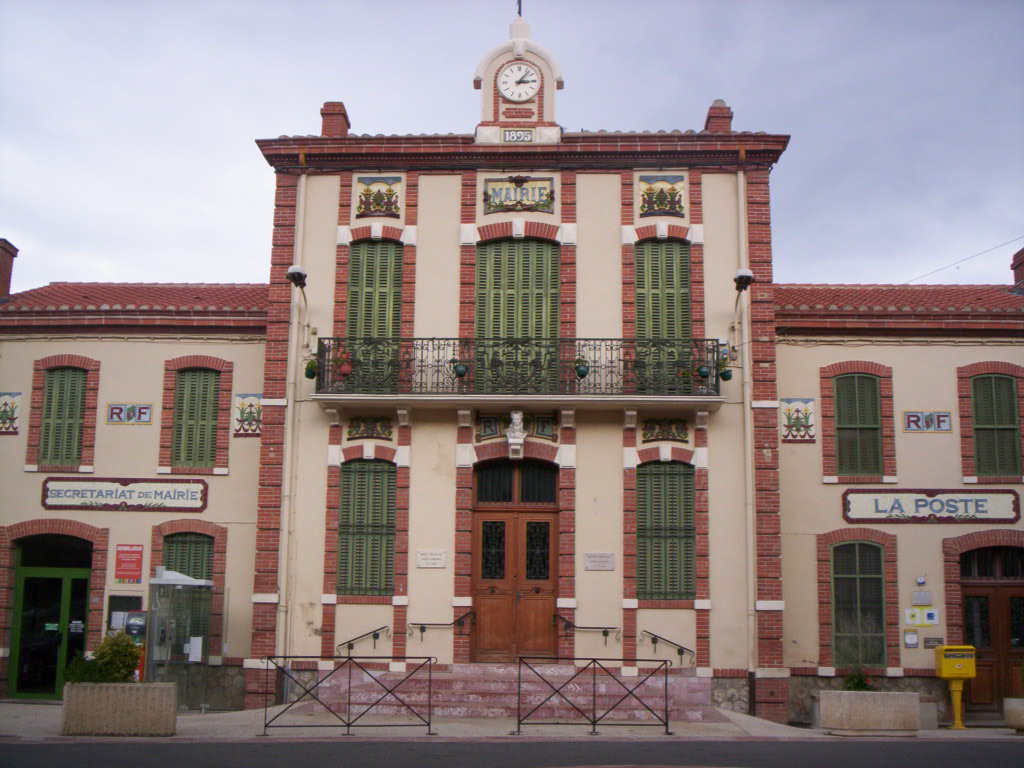
- The town hall of Tautavel

- Coat of arms
- Location of Tautavel
- Location within France Location within Occitanie
- Coordinates: 42°48′55″N 2°44′50″E
- Country: France
- Region: Occitania
- Department: Pyrénées-Orientales
- Arrondissement: Perpignan
- Canton: La Vallée de l'Agly
- Intercommunality: Perpignan Méditerranée Métropole

Government
  - Mayor (2020–2026): Francis Alis
- Area^{1}: 53.47 km^{2} (20.64 sq mi)
- Elevation: 105 m (344 ft)
- Highest elevation: 566 m (1,857 ft)
- Lowest elevation: 65 m (213 ft)
- Population (2023): 945
  - Density: 17.7/km^{2} (45.8/sq mi)
- Time zone: UTC+01:00 (CET)
  - Summer (DST): UTC+02:00 (CEST)
- INSEE/Postal code: 66205 /66720
- ^{1} French Land Register data, which excludes lakes, ponds, glaciers > 1 km^{2} (0.386 sq mi or 247 acres) and river estuaries.

Tautavel (French pronunciation: [totavɛl]; Catalan: Talteüll) is a commune in the Pyrénées-Orientales department in southern France.

It is home to The European Centre for Prehistoric Research (CERP). Tautavel Man, an early human and some of the oldest human remains in Europe, was found in Caune de l'Arago, a cave in the commune.

== Geography ==
Tautavel is located in the canton of La Vallée de l'Agly and in the arrondissement of Perpignan.

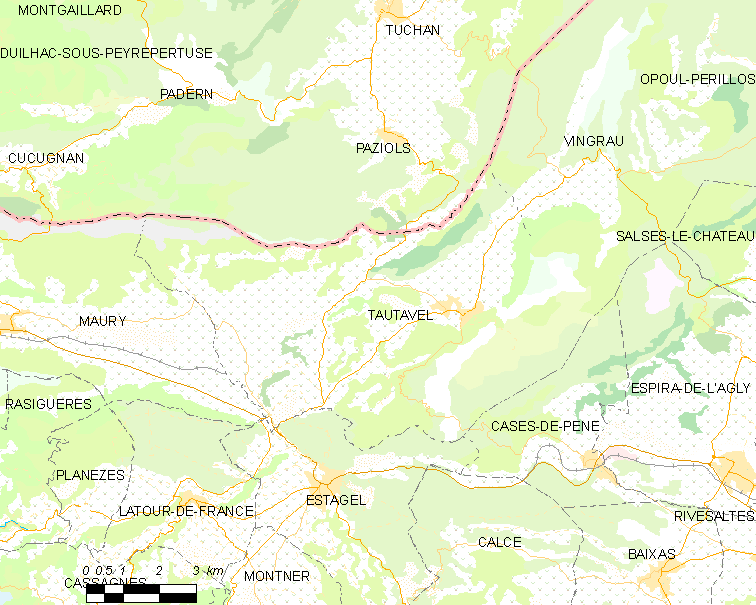
Map of Tautavel and its surrounding communes

== Population ==
Historical population
| Year | Pop. | ±% p.a. |
|---|---|---|
| 1968 | 947 | — |
| 1975 | 776 | −2.80% |
| 1982 | 654 | −2.41% |
| 1990 | 738 | +1.52% |
| 1999 | 851 | +1.60% |
| 2007 | 903 | +0.74% |
| 2012 | 869 | −0.76% |
| 2017 | 866 | −0.07% |
| 2023 | 945 | +1.47% |
Source: INSEE

== Places of interest ==
- The prehistoric Museum of Tautavel with a replica of the Cave of Arago (Caune d'Arago), site of the discovery of the ‘Homme de Tautavel’. Copies of the fossils of Homo heidelbergensis, stone tools and original animal fossils are also on display. In several dioramas, living environments from the era of the ‘’Hommes de Tautavel‘’ and the later Neanderthals are brought to life.
- Only ruins remain of the castle of the ‘’Château de Tautavel‘’
- The ‘’Église Saint-Génis‘’ dates from the 16th/17th century.

== Environment ==
- The Arago cave, located approx. 3 km north of the village, is not open to visitors
- The Chapelle de Saintes-Puelles, located about 2 km south of the village near the road to Estagel, is a simple building from the early 19th century that is well worth seeing.
- The watchtower "Tour del Far" high above the village (498 m) dates from the time of the Kingdom of Mallorca.

== See also ==
- Communes of the Pyrénées-Orientales department
