= Submandibular fovea =

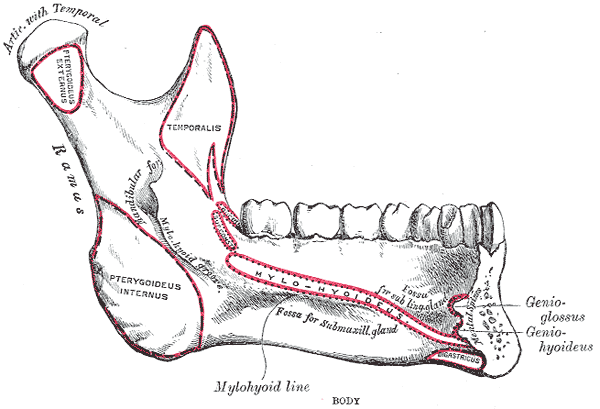
- Mandible. Inner surface. Side view

Details

Identifiers
- Latin: fovea submandibularis, fossa submandibularis
- TA98: A02.1.15.015
- TA2: 851
- FMA: 59435

The submandibular fovea (or submandibular fossa or submaxillary fovea) is an impression on the medial side of the body of the mandible below the mylohyoid line. It is the location for the submandibular gland.
