= Orce =

Orce, Spain
- Village
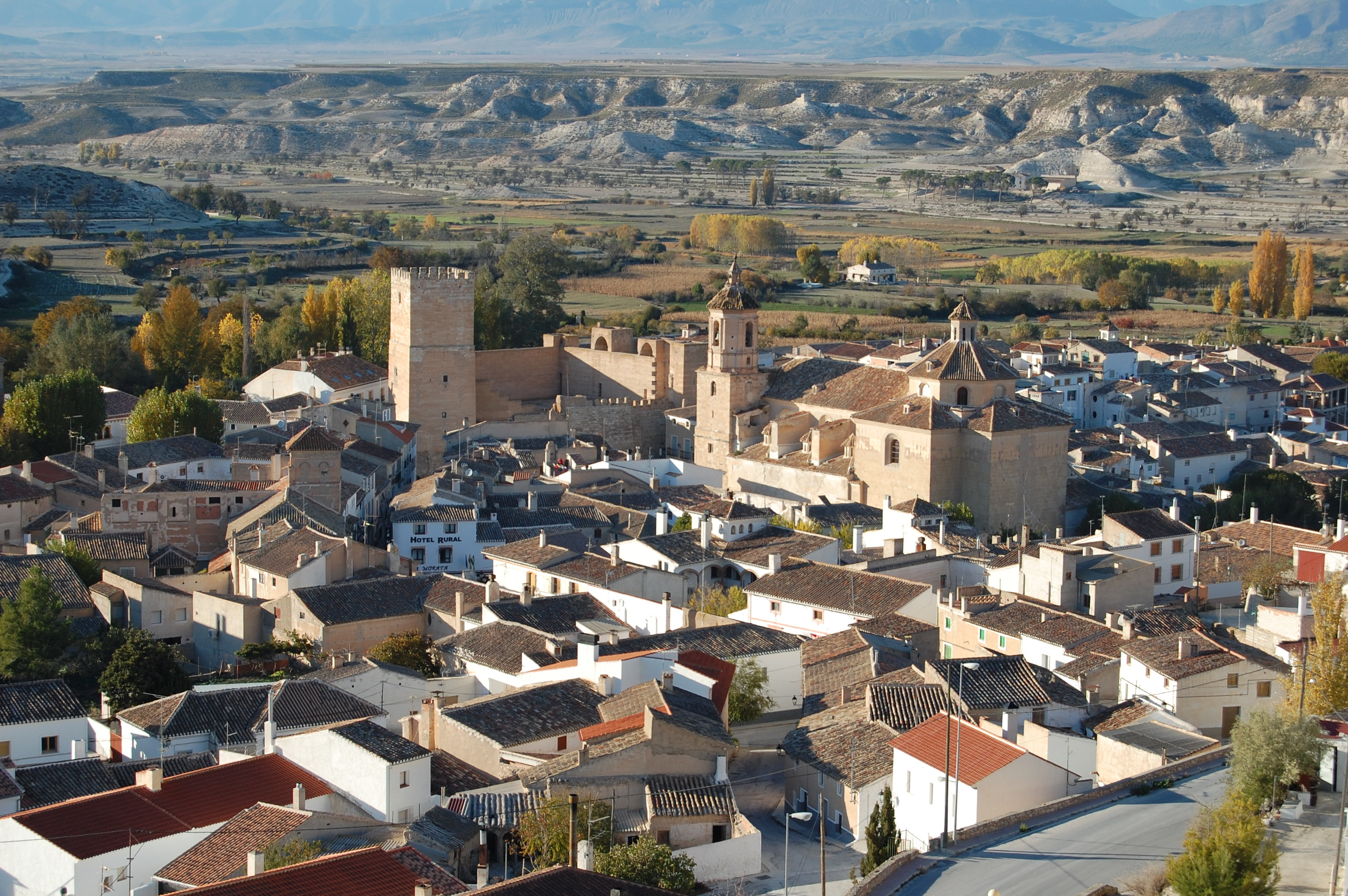
- View of Orce
- Flag Coat of arms
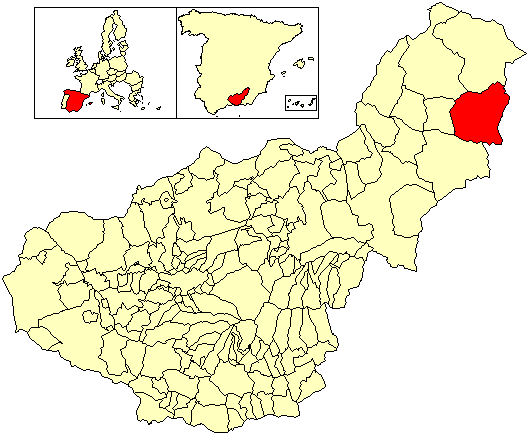
- Location of Orce
- Coordinates: 37°43′17″N 02°28′46″W
- Country: Spain
- Province: Granada
- Municipality: Orce

Area
  - Total: 324 km^{2} (125 sq mi)
- Elevation: 928 m (3,045 ft)

Population (2025-01-01)
  - Total: 1,116
  - Density: 3.44/km^{2} (8.92/sq mi)
- Time zone: UTC+1 (CET)
  - Summer (DST): UTC+2 (CEST)

Orce is a municipality located in the province of Granada, in southeastern Spain. According to the 2009 census (INE), the town has a population of 1,333 inhabitants.

== Paleoanthropology ==
Orce is the location of the paleo-archaeological sites known as Barranco León, Venta Micena, and Fuente Nueva 3, near the basin of an ancient lake where fossils have been preserved in sediment. Josep Gibert of the M. Crusafont Institute in Sabadell led an excavation team there. He asserted that the sites have Oldowan-style stone tools dating between 1.5 and 1.8 million years ago. If the early estimates are supported, these would represent the oldest stone tool finds in Europe and of settlers in Europe. Other scholars prefer a more conservative date for the stone tools of 1.2 million years. Together with the hominid remains at the Atapuerca Mountains, the tools are evidence that human ancestors settled in western Europe more than one million years (Ma) ago.

Recent numerical dating studies using Electron Spin Resonance (ESR) method applied to fossil teeth and quartz grains have provided ages of ca. 1.2 Ma for Fuente Nueva 3, and ca. 1.4 Ma for Barranco León and Venta Micena.

== See also ==
- List of municipalities in Granada
