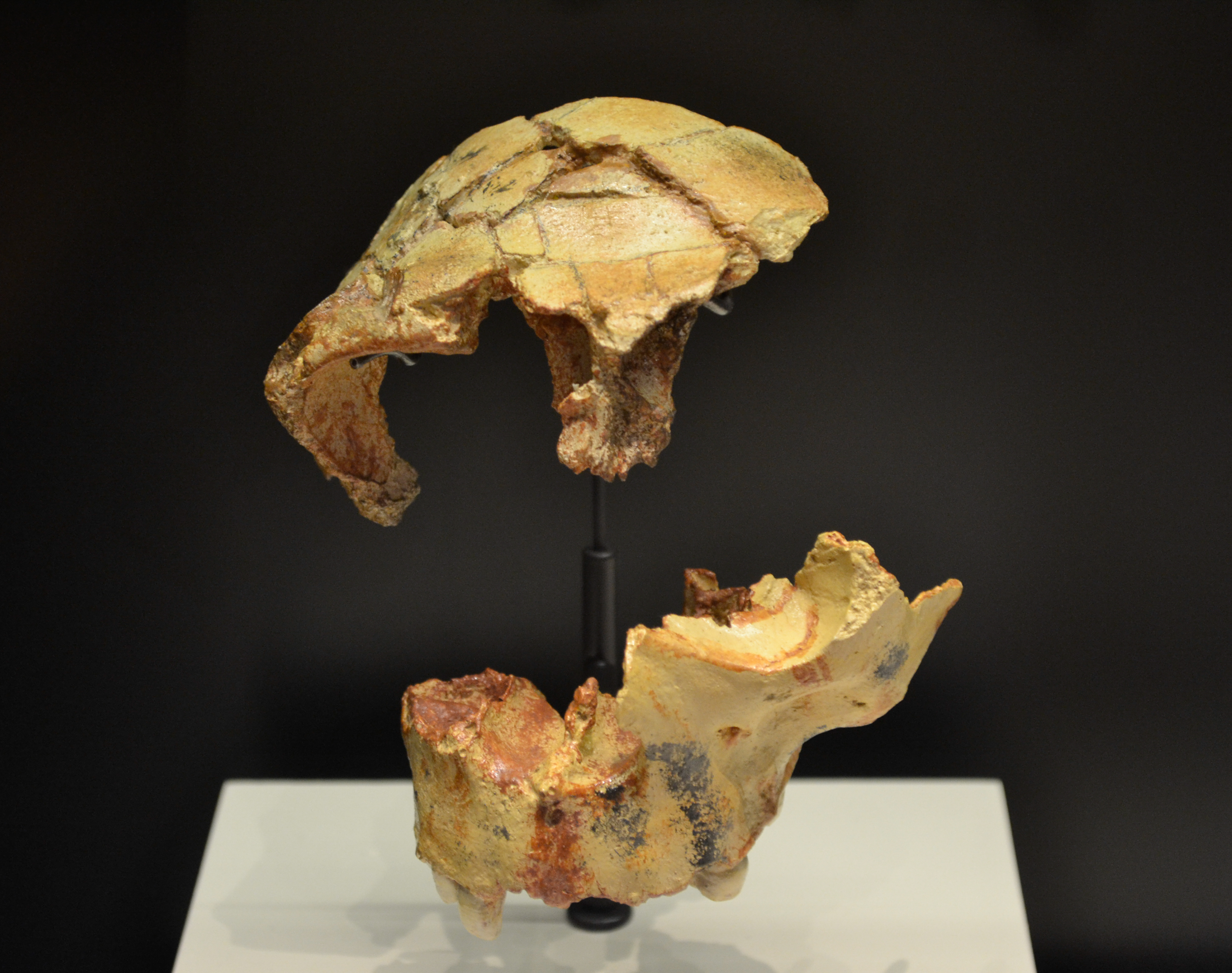
- The "Boy of Gran Dolina" fossils ATD6-15 (frontal bone); ATD6-69 (maxilla); Museo Arqueológico Nacional, Madrid

Scientific classification
- Kingdom: Animalia
- Phylum: Chordata
- Class: Mammalia
- Infraclass: Placentalia
- Order: Primates
- Superfamily: Hominoidea
- Family: Hominidae
- Genus: Homo
- Species: †H. antecessor

Binomial name
- †Homo antecessor Bermúdez de Castro et al., 1997

= Homo antecessor =

Homo antecessor Temporal range: Early Pleistocene, 1.2–0.77 Ma

Archaic human species from 1 million years ago

Homo antecessor (Latin for 'pioneer man') is an extinct species of archaic human recorded in the Spanish Sierra de Atapuerca, a productive archaeological site, from 1.2 to 0.8 million years ago during the Early Pleistocene. Populations of this species may have been present elsewhere in Western Europe, and were among the first to settle that region of the world, hence the name. The first fossils were found in the Gran Dolina cave in 1994, and the species was formally described in 1997 as the last common ancestor of modern humans and Neanderthals, supplanting the more conventional H. heidelbergensis in this position. H. antecessor has since been reinterpreted as an offshoot from the modern human line, although probably one branching off just before the modern human/Neanderthal split.

Despite being so ancient, the face is unexpectedly similar to that of modern humans rather than other archaic humans—namely in its overall flatness as well as the curving of the cheekbone as it merges into the upper jaw—although these elements are known only from a juvenile specimen. Brain volume could have been 1,000 cc (61 cu in) or more, but no intact braincase has been discovered. This is within the range of variation for modern humans. Stature estimates range from 162.3–186.8 cm (5 ft 4 in – 6 ft 2 in). H. antecessor may have been broad-chested and rather heavy, much like Neanderthals, although the limbs were proportionally long, a trait more frequent in tropical populations. The kneecaps are thin and have poorly developed tendon attachments. The feet indicate H. antecessor walked differently than modern humans.

H. antecessor was predominantly manufacturing simple pebble and flake stone tools out of quartz and chert, although they used a variety of materials. This industry has some similarities with the more complex Acheulean, an industry which is characteristic of contemporary African and later European sites. Groups may have been dispatching hunting parties, which mainly targeted deer in their savannah and mixed woodland environment. Many of the H. antecessor specimens were cannibalised, perhaps as a cultural practice. There is no evidence they used fire, and they similarly only inhabited inland Iberia during warm periods, presumably retreating to the coast otherwise.

== Taxonomy ==
=== Research history ===
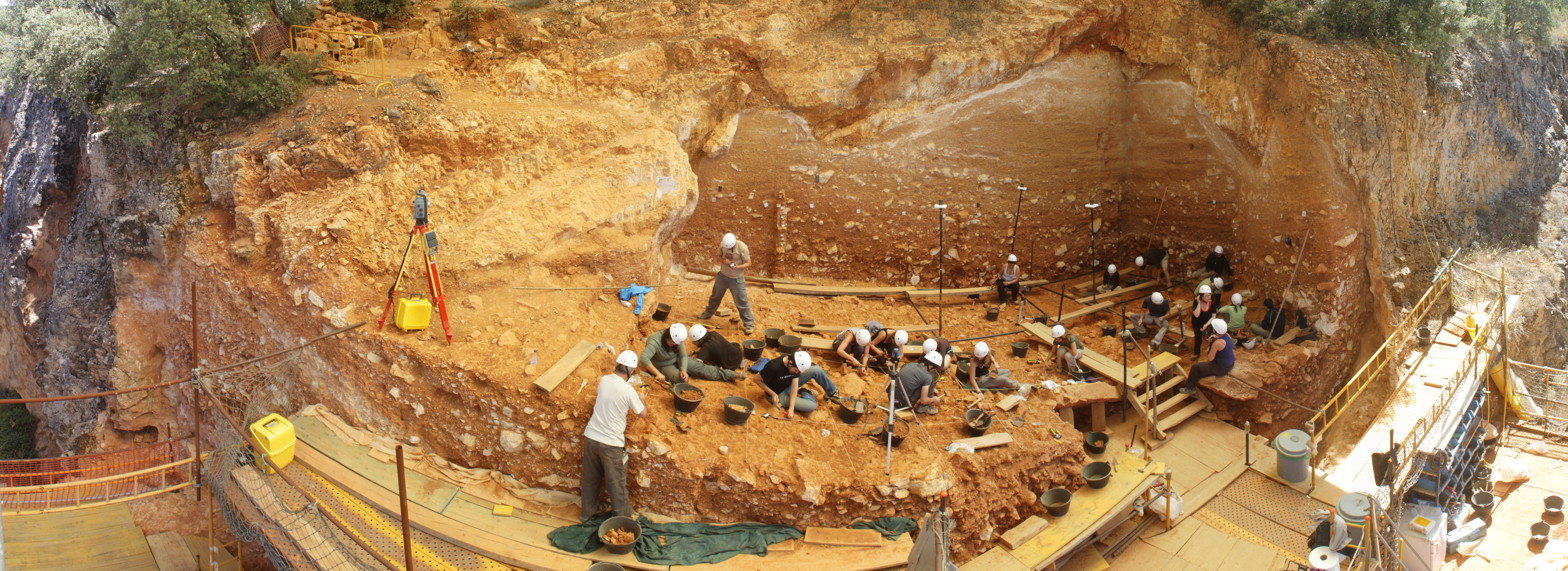
Excavation of the Gran Dolina in 2012

The Sierra de Atapuerca in northern Spain had long been known to be abundant in fossil remains. The Gran Dolina ("great sinkhole") was first explored for fossils by archaeologist Francisco Jordá Cerdá in a short field trip to the region in 1966, where he recovered a few animal fossils and stone tools. He lacked the resources and manpower to continue any further. In 1976, Spanish palaeontologist Trinidad Torres investigated the Gran Dolina for bear fossils (he recovered Ursus remains), but was advised by the Edelweiss Speleological Club to continue at the nearby Sima de los Huesos ("bone pit"). Here, in addition to a wealth of bear fossils, he also recovered archaic human fossils, which prompted a massive exploration of the Sierra de Atapuerca, at first headed by Spanish palaeontologist Emiliano Aguirre but quickly taken over by José María Bermúdez de Castro, Eudald Carbonell, and Juan Luis Arsuaga. They restarted excavation of the Gran Dolina in 1992, and found archaic human remains two years later; in 1997, they formally described these as a new species, Homo antecessor. The holotype is specimen ATD6-5, a right mandibular fragment retaining the molars and recovered with some isolated teeth. In their original description Castro and colleagues posited that the species was the first human to colonise Europe, hence the name antecessor (Latin for "explorer", "pioneer", or "early settler").

The 25 m (82 ft) of Pleistocene sediments at the Gran Dolina are divided into eleven units, TD1 to TD11 ("trinchera dolina" or "sinkhole trench"). H. antecessor was recovered from TD6, which has consequently become the most well-researched unit of the site. In the first field seasons from 1994 to 1995, the dig team excavated a small test pit (to see if the unit warranted further investigation) in the southeast section measuring 6 m^{2} (65 sq ft). Human fossils were discovered first by Aurora Martín Nájera; the 30 cm (12 in) layer they were found in is nicknamed the "Aurora Stratum" after her. A 13 m^{2} (140 sq ft) triangular section was excavated in the central section starting in the early 2000s. Human fossils were also found in the northern section. In sum, about 170 H. antecessor specimens were recovered. The best preserved are ATD6-15 and ATD6-69 (possibly belonging to the same individual) that most clearly elucidate facial anatomy. Subsequent field seasons have yielded about sixty more specimens. The discovered parts of the H. antecessor skeleton are: elements of the face, clavicle, forearm, digits, knees, and a few vertebrae and ribs.

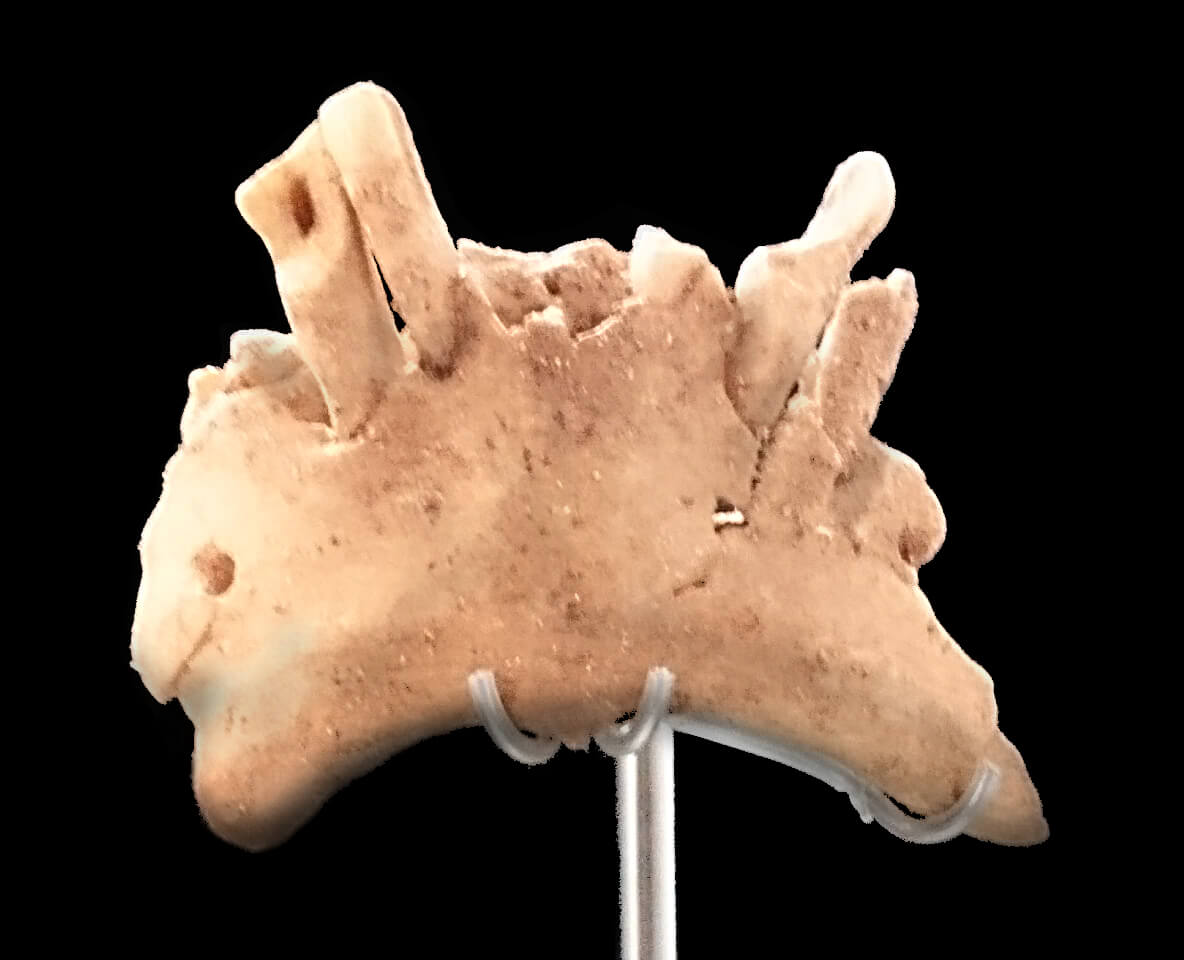
The mandible ATE9-1

In 2007, a mandibular fragment with some teeth, ATE9-1, provisionally assigned to H. antecessor by Carbonell, was recovered from the nearby Sima del Elefante ("elephant pit") in unit TE9 ("trinchera elefante"), belonging to a 20– to 25-year-old individual. The site additionally yielded stone flakes and evidence of butchery. In 2011, after providing a much more in depth analysis of the Sima del Elefante material, Castro and colleagues were unsure of the species classification, opting to leave it at Homo sp. (making no opinion on species designation) pending further discoveries.

The stone tool assemblage at the Gran Dolina is broadly similar to several other contemporary ones across Western Europe, which may represent the work of the same species, although this is unconfirmable because many of these sites have not produced human fossils. In 2014 fifty footprints dating to between 800,000 and 1.2 million years ago were discovered in Happisburgh, England, which was provisionally attributed to an H. antecessor group given it was the only human species identified during that time in Western Europe. In 2025, another human face was discovered at the Sima del Elefante, dating to 1.1 to 1.4 million years ago. The discoverers opted to provisionally classify it as Homo aff. erectus (affinities to H. erectus) because it lacked the characteristic features of H. antecessor in the midface.

=== Classification ===
The face of H. antecessor is unexpectedly similar to that of modern humans compared to other archaic groups; so, in their original description, Castro and colleagues classified it as the last common ancestor of modern humans and Neanderthals, supplanting H. heidelbergensis in this capacity. The facial anatomy came under close scrutiny in subsequent years.

Human family tree according to Chris Stringer, 2012, showing H. antecessor as an offshoot of the modern human line

In 2001 French palaeoanthropologist Jean-Jacques Hublin postulated that the Gran Dolina remains and the contemporaneous Tighennif remains from Algeria (usually classified as Homo ergaster [=? Homo erectus], originally "Atlantanthropus mauritanicus" (Note: The Tighennif remains were classified by French vertebrate paleontologist Camille Arambourg as Atlantanthropus mauritanicus in 1955. This name is usually sunk into H. erectus, but many authors choose to distinguish Asian and African populations on a species level, with the latter classified into H. ergaster which was named in 1975. This is somewhat problematic as several African specimens sunk into H. ergaster were already given unique species designations which should take priority, including H. mauritanicus.)) represent the same population, because fourteen of the fifteen dental features Castro and colleagues listed for H. antecessor have also been identified in the Middle Pleistocene of North Africa; this would mean H. antecessor is a junior synonym of "Homo mauritanicus", i. e., the Gran Dolina and Tighennif humans should be classified into the latter. In 2007 Castro and colleagues studied the fossils, and found the Tighennif remains to be much larger than H. antecessor and dentally similar to other African populations. Nonetheless, they still recommended reviving mauritanicus to house all Early Pleistocene North African specimens as "H. ergaster mauritanicus".

In 2007 primatologist Esteban Sarmiento and colleagues questioned the legitimacy of H. antecessor as a separate species because much of the skull anatomy is unknown; H. heidelbergensis is known from roughly the same time and region; and because the type specimen was a child (the supposedly characteristic features could have disappeared with maturity.) Such restructuring of the face, they argued, can also be caused by regional climatic adaptation rather than speciation. In 2009 American palaeoanthropologist Richard Klein stated he was skeptical that H. antecessor was ancestral to H. heidelbergensis, interpreting H. antecessor as "an offshoot of H. ergaster [from Africa] that disappeared after a failed attempt to colonize southern Europe". Similarly, in 2012, British physical anthropologist Chris Stringer considered H. antecessor and H. heidelbergensis to be two different lineages rather than them having an ancestor/descendant relationship. In 2013, anthropologist Sarah Freidline and colleagues suggested the modern humanlike face evolved independently several times among Homo. In 2017 Castro and colleagues conceded that H. antecessor may or may not be a modern human ancestor, although if it was not then it probably split quite shortly before the modern human/Neanderthal split. In 2020 Dutch molecular palaeoanthropologist Frido Welker and colleagues concluded H. antecessor is not a modern human ancestor by analysing ancient proteins collected from the tooth ATD6-92.

=== Age and taphonomy ===
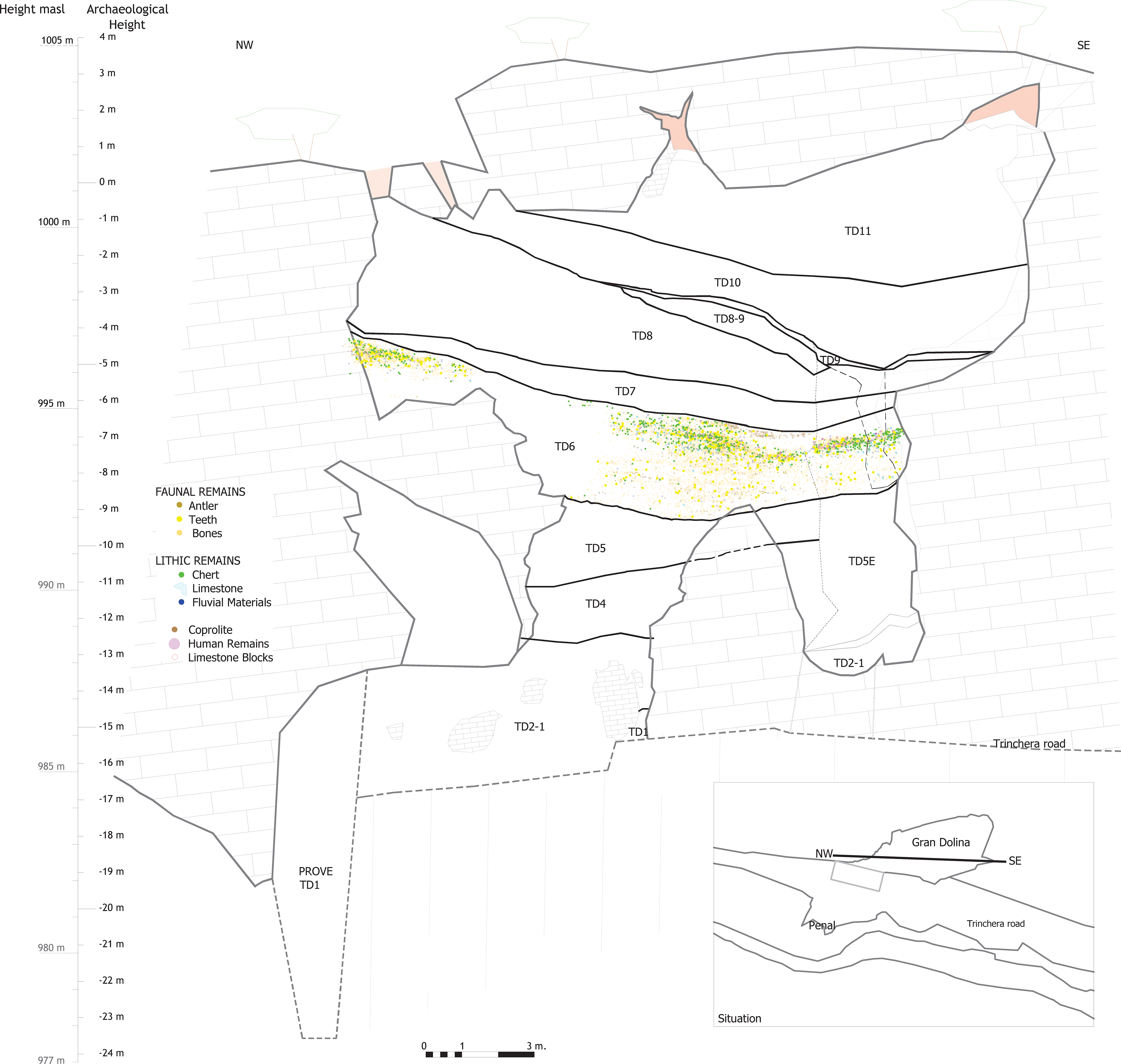
Stratigraphy of the Gran Dolina with detail on TD6

The 2003 to 2007 excavations revealed a much more intricate stratigraphy than previously thought, and TD6 was divided into three subunits spanning thirteen layers and nine sedimentary facies (bodies of rock distinctive from adjacent bodies). Human presence is recorded in subunits 1 and 2, and in facies A, D1, and F. Randomly orientated scattered bones were deposited in Facies D1 of layer TD6.2.2 (TD6 subunit 2, layer 2) and Facies F of layers TD6.2.2 and TD6.2.3, but in Facies D they seem to have been conspicuously clumped into the northwest area. This might indicate they were dragged into the cave via a debris flow. As for Facies F, which contains the most human remains, they may have been deposited by a low energy debris flow (consistent with floodplain behaviour) from the main entrance to the northwest, as well as a stronger debris flow from another entrance to the south. Fluvially deposited fossils (dragged in by a stream of water) were also recovered from Facies A in layers TD6.2.2, TD6.2.1 and TD6.1.2, indicated by limestone gravel within the size range of the remains. Thus, H. antecessor may not have inhabited the cave, although was at least active nearby. Only 5.6% of the fossils bear any evidence of weathering from open air, roots, and soil, which could mean they were deposited deep into the cave relatively soon after death.

Human occupation seems to have occurred in waves corresponding to timespans featuring a warm, humid savannah habitat (although riversides likely supported woodlands). These conditions were only present during transitions from cool glacial to warm interglacial periods, after the climate warmed and before the forests could expand to dominate the landscape. The dating attempts of H. antecessor remains are:

- In 1999 two ungulate teeth from TD6 were dated using uranium–thorium dating to 794 to 668 thousand years ago, and further constrained palaeomagnetically to over 780,000 years ago.
- In 2008 TE9 of the Sima del Elefante was constrained to 1.2–1.1 million years ago using palaeomagnetism and cosmogenic dating.
- In 2013 TD6 was dated to about 930 to 780 thousand years ago using palaeomagnetism, in addition to uranium–thorium and electron spin resonance dating (ESR) on more teeth.
- In 2018 ESR dating of the H. antecessor specimen ATD6-92 resulted in an age of 949 to 624 thousand years ago, further constrained palaeomagnetically to before 772,000 years ago.
- In 2022 ESR and single grain thermally transferred optically stimulated luminescence (SG TT-OSL) dated the opening of the Gran Dolina to roughly 900,000 years ago, and the sediments from TD4 to TD6 to between 890,000 and 770,000 years ago. These three units were probably deposited within a period of less than 100,000 years.

Until 2013 with the discovery of the 1.4-million-year-old infant tooth from Barranco León, Orce, Spain, these were the oldest human fossils known from Europe, although human activity on the continent stretches back as early as 1.6 million years ago in Eastern Europe and Spain indicated by stone tools.

== Anatomy ==
=== Skull ===
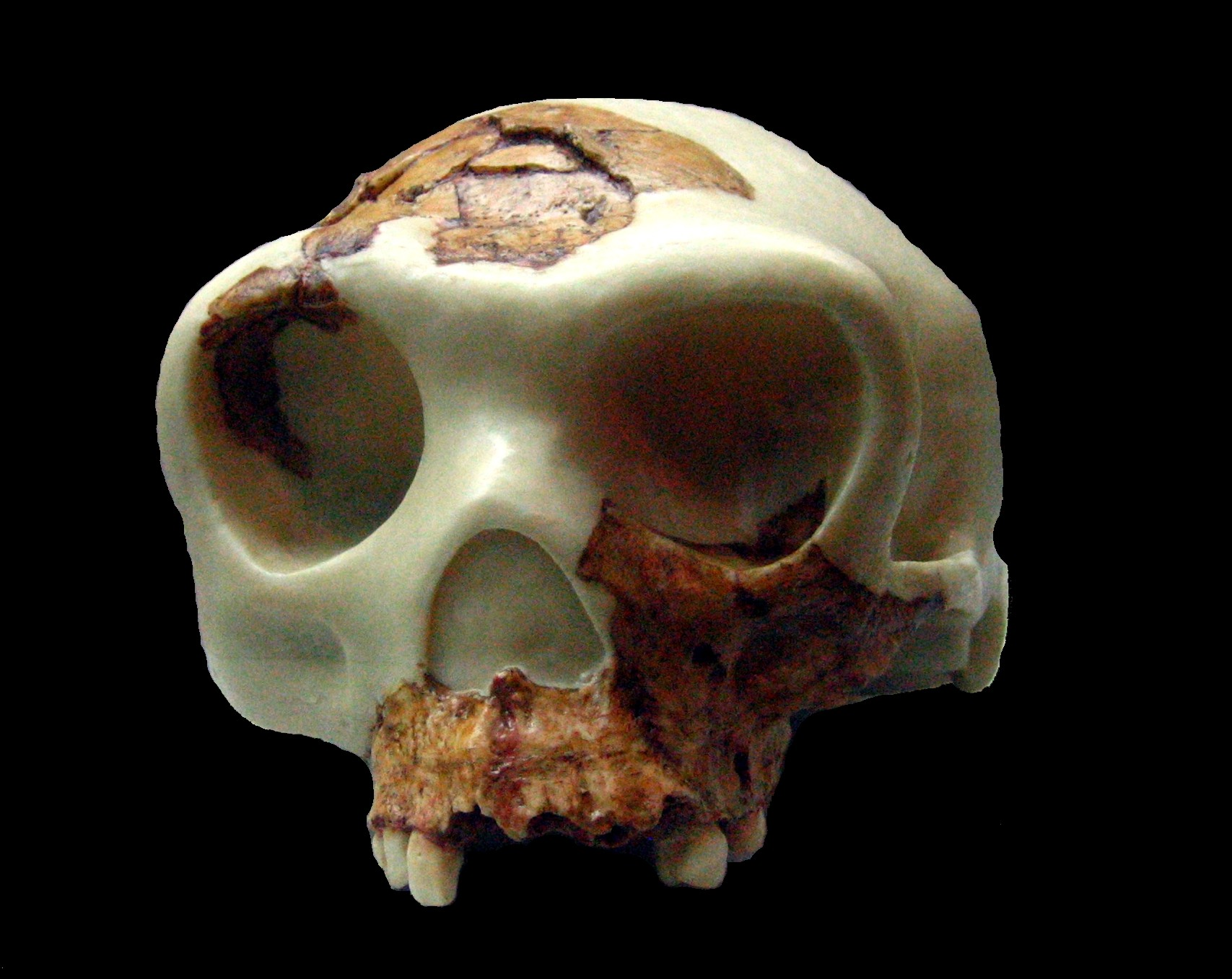
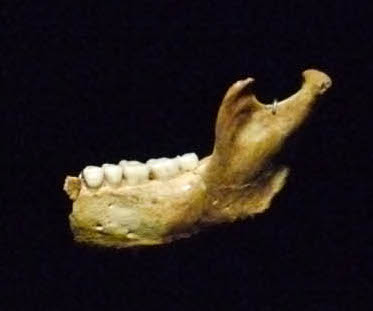
Reconstructed skull of the Boy of the Gran Dolina (above) and the adult mandible ATD6-96 (below)

The facial anatomy of H. antecessor is predominantly known from the 10–11.5-year-old H. antecessor child ATD6-69, as the few other facial specimens are fragmentary. ATD6-69 is strikingly similar to modern humans (as well as East Asian Middle Pleistocene archaic humans) as opposed to West Eurasian or African Middle Pleistocene archaic humans including Neanderthals. The most notable traits are a completely flat face and a curved zygomaticoalveolar crest (the bar of bone connecting the cheek to the part of the maxilla that holds the teeth). In 2013 anthropologist Sarah Freidline and colleagues statistically determined that these features would not disappear with maturity. H. antecessor suggests the modern human face evolved and disappeared multiple times in the past, which is not unlikely as facial anatomy is strongly influenced by diet and thus the environment. The nasal bones are like those of modern humans. The mandible (lower jaw) is quite gracile unlike most other archaic humans. It exhibits several archaic features, but the shape of the mandibular notch is modern humanlike, and the alveolar part (adjacent to the teeth) is completely vertical as in modern humans. Like many Neanderthals, the medial pterygoid tubercle is large. Unlike most Neanderthals, there is no retromolar space (a large gap between the last molar and the end of the body of the mandible).

The upper incisors are shovel-shaped (the lingual, or tongue, side is distinctly concave), a feature characteristic of other Eurasian human populations, including modern. The canines bear the cingulum (a protuberance toward the base) and the essential ridge (toward the midline) like more derived species, but retain the cuspules (small bumps) near the tip and bordering incisor like more archaic species. Compared to later hominins, the lower canines of H. antecessor bear fewer perikymata. The upper premolar crowns are rather derived, being nearly symmetrical and bearing a lingual cusp (on the tongue side), and a cingulum and longitudinal grooves on the cheekward side. The upper molars feature several traits typically seen in Neanderthals. The mandibular teeth, on the other hand, are quite archaic. The P_{3} (the first lower premolar) has a strongly asymmetrical crown and complex tooth root system. P_{3} is smaller than P_{4} like in more derived species, but like other early Homo, M_{1} (the first lower molar) is smaller than M_{2} and the cusps of the molar crowns make a Y shape. The distribution of enamel is Neanderthal-like, with thicker layers at the periphery than at the cusps. Based on two canine teeth (ATD6- 69 and ATD6-13), the thickness of the enamel and the proportion of the tooth covered by the gums vary to the same degree as for males and females of modern humans and many other apes, so this may be due to sexual dimorphism, with females having smaller teeth, relatively thicker enamel, and smaller proportion of gum coverage.

The parietal bones (each being one side of the back part of the top of the skull) are flattened, and conjoin at a peak at the midline. This "tent-like" profile is also exhibited in more archaic African H. ergaster and Asian H. erectus. Like H. ergaster, the temporal styloid process just below the ear is fused to the base of the skull. The brow ridges are prominent. The upper margin of the squamous part of temporal bones (on the side of the skull) is convex, like in more derived species. The brain volume of ATD6-15, perhaps belonging to an 11-year-old, may have been 1,000 cc (61 cu in) or more based on frontal bone measurements. (Note: The frontal breadth (the length of the frontal bone) and the bistephanic breadth (the length between each stephanion) of ATD6-15 are, respectively, 95–100 mm (3.7–3.9 in) and 100 mm (3.9 in), which are substantially longer than what is measured in the H. erectus specimens KNM ER 3733, KNM ER 3883, Sangiran 2, or Trinil 2, which each have an estimated brain volume of less than 1,000 cc (61 cu in).) This is within the range of variation for modern humans.

=== Torso ===
The notably large adult clavicle specimen ATD6-50, assumed male based on absolute size, was estimated to have stood 162.3–186.8 cm (5 ft 4 in – 6 ft 2 in), mean of 174.5 cm (5 ft 9 in), based on the correlation among modern Indian people between clavicle length and stature. An adult radius (a forearm bone), ATD6-43, which could be male based on absolute size or female based on gracility, was estimated to have belonged to a 172.5 cm (5 ft 8 in) tall individual based on the average of equations among several modern populations relating radial length to stature. Based on metatarsal (foot bone) length, a male is estimated to have stood 173 cm (5 ft 8 in) and a female 168.9 cm (5 ft 6 in). These are all rather similar values. For comparison, Western European Neanderthal estimates average 165.3 cm (5 ft 5 in), and early European modern humans 178.4 cm (5 ft 10 in). The ankle joint is adapted for handling high stress, which may indicate a heavy, robust body plan, much like Neanderthals. Based on the relationship between human footprint length and body size, twelve Happisburgh prints that are preserved well enough to measure are consistent with individuals ranging from 93 to 173 cm (3 ft 1 in to 5 ft 8 in) in stature, which may mean some of the trackmakers were children. By this logic, the three biggest footprints—equating to statures of 160 cm (5 ft 3 in), 163 cm (5 ft 4 in), and 173 cm (5 ft 8 in)—ranged from 48 to 53 kg (106 to 117 lb) in weight. Stature estimates for H. antecessor, H. heidelbergensis, and Neanderthals are roughly consistent with each other.

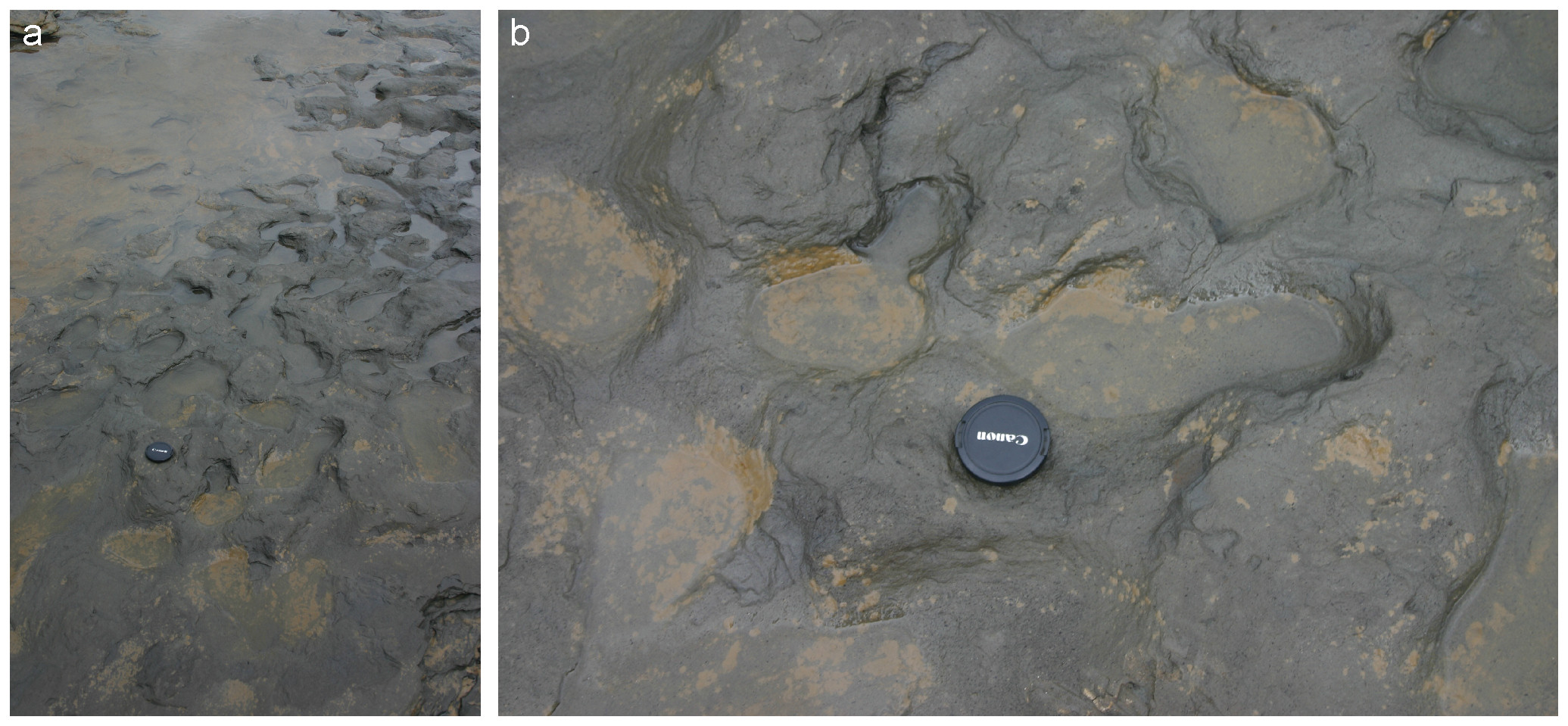
The Happisburgh footprints with a camera lens cap for scale

Two atlases (the first neck vertebra) are known, which is exceptional as this bone is rarely discovered for archaic humans. They are indistinguishable from those of modern humans. For the axis (the second neck vertebra), the angle of the spinous process (jutting out from the vertebra) is about 19 degrees, comparable with Neanderthals and modern humans, diverging from H. ergaster with a low angle of about 8°. The vertebral foramen (which houses the spinal cord) is a little narrower than what is commonly seen in modern humans. The spine as a whole otherwise aligns with modern humans.

There is one known (and incomplete) clavicle, ATD6-50, which is thick compared to those of modern humans. This may indicate H. antecessor had long and flattish (platycleidic) clavicles like other archaic humans. This would point to a broad chest. The proximal curvature (twisting of the bone on the side nearest the neck) in front view is on par with that of Neanderthals, but the distal curvature (on the shoulder side) is much more pronounced. The sternum is narrow. The acromion (that extends over the shoulder joint) is small compared to those of modern humans. The shoulder blade is similar to all Homo with a typical human body plan, indicating H. antecessor was not as skilled a climber as non-human apes or pre-erectus species, but was capable of efficiently launching projectiles such as stones or spears.

=== Limbs ===
The incomplete radius, ATD6-43, was estimated to have measured 257 mm (10.1 in). It is oddly long and straight for someone from so far north, reminiscent of the proportions seen in early modern humans and many people from tropical populations. This could be explained as retention of the ancestral long limbed tropical form, as opposed to Neanderthals who evolved shorter limbs. This could also indicate a high brachial index (radial to humeral length ratio). Compared to more recent human species, the cross section of the radial shaft is rather round and gracile throughout its length. Like archaic humans, the radial neck (near the elbow) is long, giving more leverage to the biceps brachii. Like modern humans and H. heidelbergensis, but unlike Neanderthals and more archaic hominins, the radial tuberosity (a bony knob jutting out just below the radial neck) is anteriorly placed (toward the front side when the arm is facing out).

Like those of other archaic humans, the femur features a developed trochanteric fossa and posterior crest. These traits are highly variable among modern human populations. The two known kneecaps, ATD6-22 and ATD6-56, are subrectangular in shape as opposed to the more common subtriangular, although rather narrow like those of modern humans. They are quite small and thin, falling at the lower end for modern human females. The apex of the kneecap (the area that does not join to another bone) is not well developed, leaving little attachment for the patellar tendon. The medial (toward the midline) facet and lateral (toward the sides) facet for the knee joint are roughly the same size as each other in ATD6-56 and the medial is larger in ATD6-22, whereas the lateral is commonly larger in modern humans. The lateral facet encroaches onto a straight flat area as opposed to being limited to a defined vastus notch, an infrequent condition among any human species.

The phalanges and metatarsals of the foot are comparable to those of later humans, but the big toe bone is rather robust, which could be related to how H. antecessor pushed off the ground. The ankle bone (talus) is exceptionally long and high as well as the facet where it connects with the leg (the trochlea), which may be related to how H. antecessor walked. The long trochlea caused a short neck of the talus, which bridges the head of the talus connecting to the toes, and the body of the talus connecting to the leg. This somewhat converges with the condition exhibited in Neanderthals, which is generally explained as a response to a heavy and robust body, to alleviate the consequently higher stress to the articular cartilage in the ankle joint. This would also have permitted greater flexion.

=== Growth rate ===
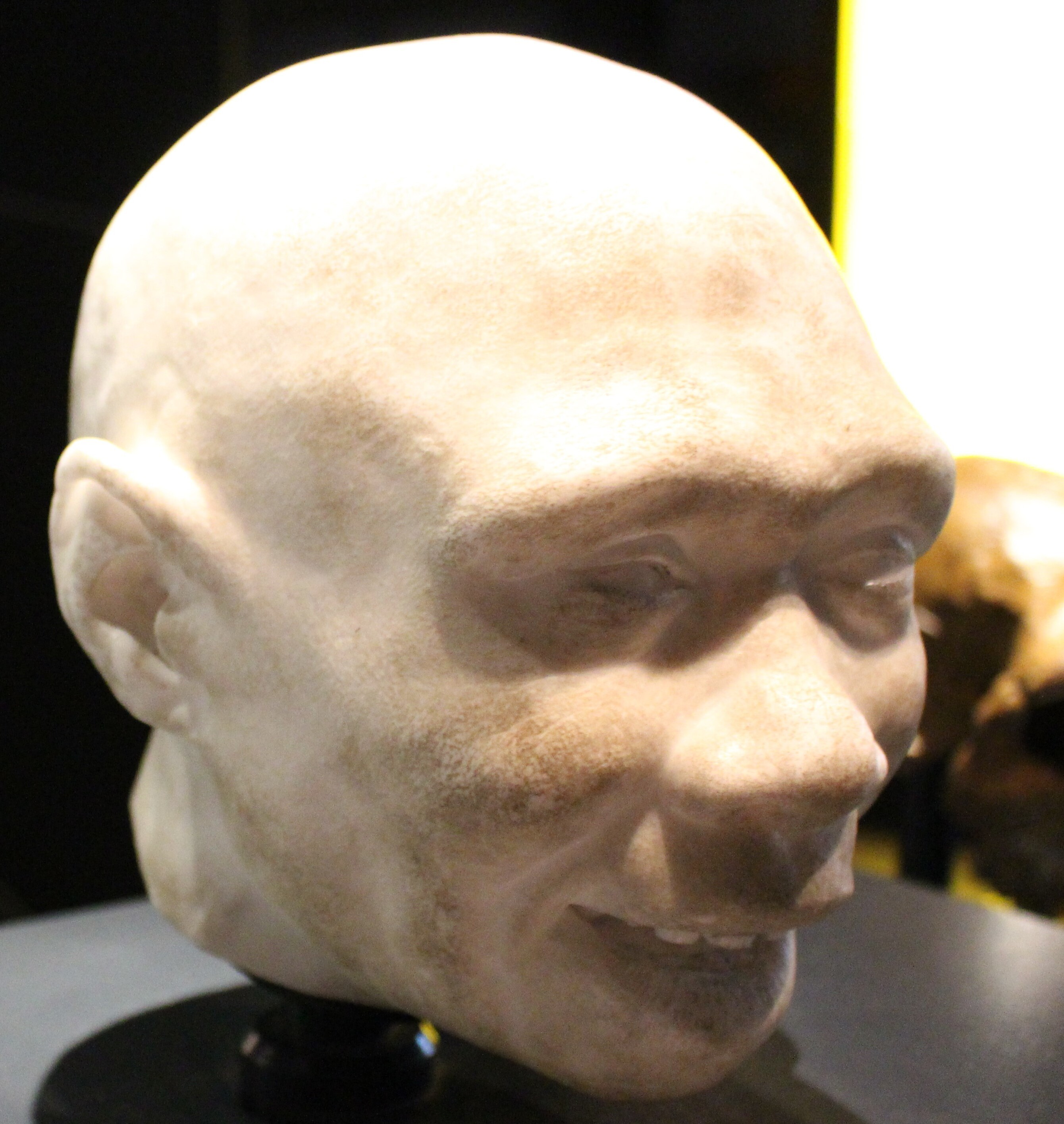
Bust of an H. antecessor child. Natural History Museum, London.

In 2010 Castro and colleagues estimated that ATD6-112, represented by a permanent upper and lower first molar, died between 5.3 and 6.6 years of age based on the tooth formation rates in chimpanzees (lower estimate) and modern humans (upper). The molars are hardly worn at all, which means the individual died soon after the tooth erupted, and that first molar eruption occurred at roughly this age. The age is within the range of variation of modern humans, and this developmental landmark can debatably be correlated with life history. If the relation is true, H. antecessor had a prolonged childhood, a characteristic of modern humans in which significant cognitive development takes place.

=== Pathology ===
The partial face ATD6-69 has an ectopic M^{3} (upper left third molar), where it erupted improperly, and this caused the impaction of M^{2}, where it was blocked from erupting at all. Although impaction of M^{3} is rather common in modern humans, as high as fifty percent in some populations, impaction of M^{2} is rare, as little as 0.08 to 2.3%. Impaction can lead to secondary lesions, such as dental cavities, root resorption, keratocysts and dentigerous cysts.

The mandible ATE9-1 exhibits severe dental attrition and abrasion of the tooth crowns and bone resorption at the root, so much so that the root canals (the sensitive interior) of the canines are exposed. The trauma is consistent with gum disease due to overloading the teeth, such as by using the mouth as a third hand to carry around items. A similar condition was also reported for the later Sima de los Huesos remains also at the Sierra de Atapuerca site.

The left knee bone ATD6-56 has a 4.7 mm × 15 mm (0.19 in × 0.59 in) height x breadth osteophyte (bone spur) on the inferior (lower) margin. Osteophytes normally form as a response to stress due to osteoarthritis, which can result from old age or improper loading of the joint as a consequence of bone misalignment or ligament laxity. In the case of ATD6-56, improper loading was likely the causal factor. Frequent squatting and kneeling can lead to this condition, but if the right knee bone ATD6-22 (that has no such trauma) belongs to the same individual, then this is unlikely to be the reason. If so, the lesion was caused by a local trauma, such as strain on the soft tissue around the joint due to high intensity activity, or a fracture of the left femur and/or tibia (that is unconfirmable since neither bone is associated with this individual).

The right fourth metatarsal ATD6-124 has a 25.8 mm × 8 mm (1.02 in × 0.31 in) length x width lesion on the medial (toward the midline of the bone) side consistent with a march fracture. This condition is most often encountered by soldiers, long-distance runners, and potentially flatfooted people whose foot bones failed under repeated, high intensity activity. Later Neanderthals would evolve a much more robust lower skeleton possibly to withstand such taxing movement across uneven terrain. Although only one other example of the condition has been identified (at Sima de los Huesos) among archaic humans, march fractures were probably a common injury for them given that the healed fracture leaves no visible mark, as well as their presumed high intensity lifestyle.

== Culture ==
=== Technology ===
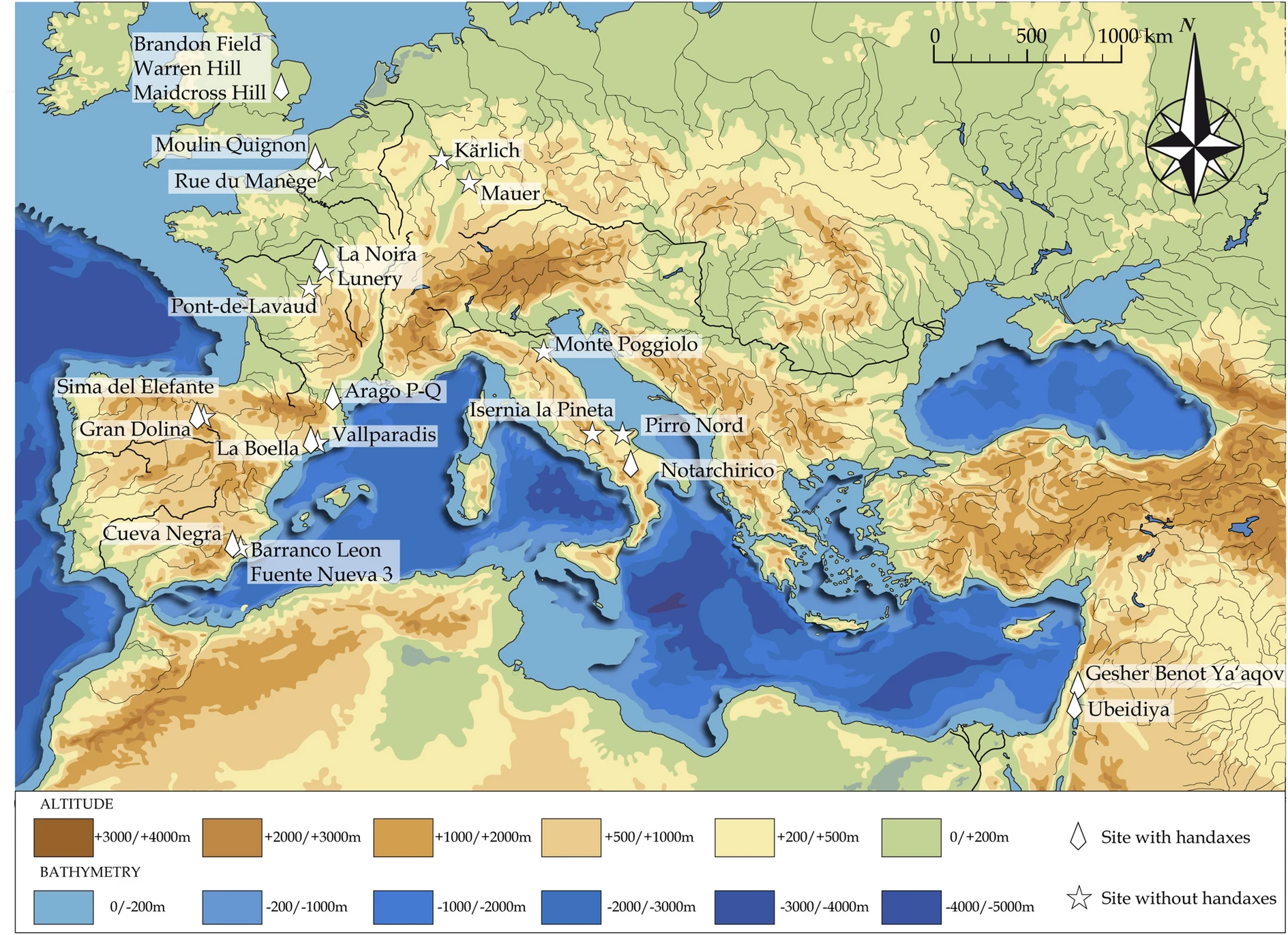
Map of Gran Dolina and Western European sites with similar or Acheulean stone tools dating from 1.4 to 0.59 million years ago

H. antecessor was producing simple stone tools at Gran Dolina. This industry is found elsewhere in Early Pleistocene Spain—notably in Barranc de la Boella and the nearby Galería—distinguished by the preparation and sharpening of cores before flaking, the presence of (crude) bifaces, and some degree of standardisation of tool types. This bears some resemblance to the much more complex Acheulean industry, characteristic of African and later European sites. The earliest evidence of typical Acheulean toolsets comes from Africa 1.75 million years ago, but the typical Acheulean toolset pops up in Western Europe nearly a million years later. It is debated if these early European sites evolved into the European Acheulean industry independently from African counterparts, or if the Acheulean was brought up from Africa and diffused across Europe. In 2020 French anthropologist Marie-Hélène Moncel argued the appearance of typical Acheulean bifaces 700,000 years ago in Europe was too sudden to be the result of completely independent evolution from local technologies, so there must have been influence from Africa. Wearing on the TD6 stone tools is consistent with repeated abrasion against flesh, so they were probably used as butchering implements.

==== TD6.3 ====
In the lower part of TD6.3 (TD6 subunit 3), 84 stone tools were recovered, predominantly small, unmodified quartzite pebbles with percussive damage—probably inflicted from pounding items such as bone—as opposed to manufacturing more specialised implements.

Although 41% of the section's assemblage consists of flakes, they are rather crude and large—averaging 38 mm × 30 mm × 11 mm (1.50 in × 1.18 in × 0.43 in)—either resulting from rudimentary knapping (stoneworking) skills or difficulty working such poor quality materials. They made use of the unipolar longitudinal method, flaking off only one side of a core, probably to compensate for the lack of preplanning, opting to knap irregularly shaped and thus poorer quality pebbles.

==== TD6.2 ====
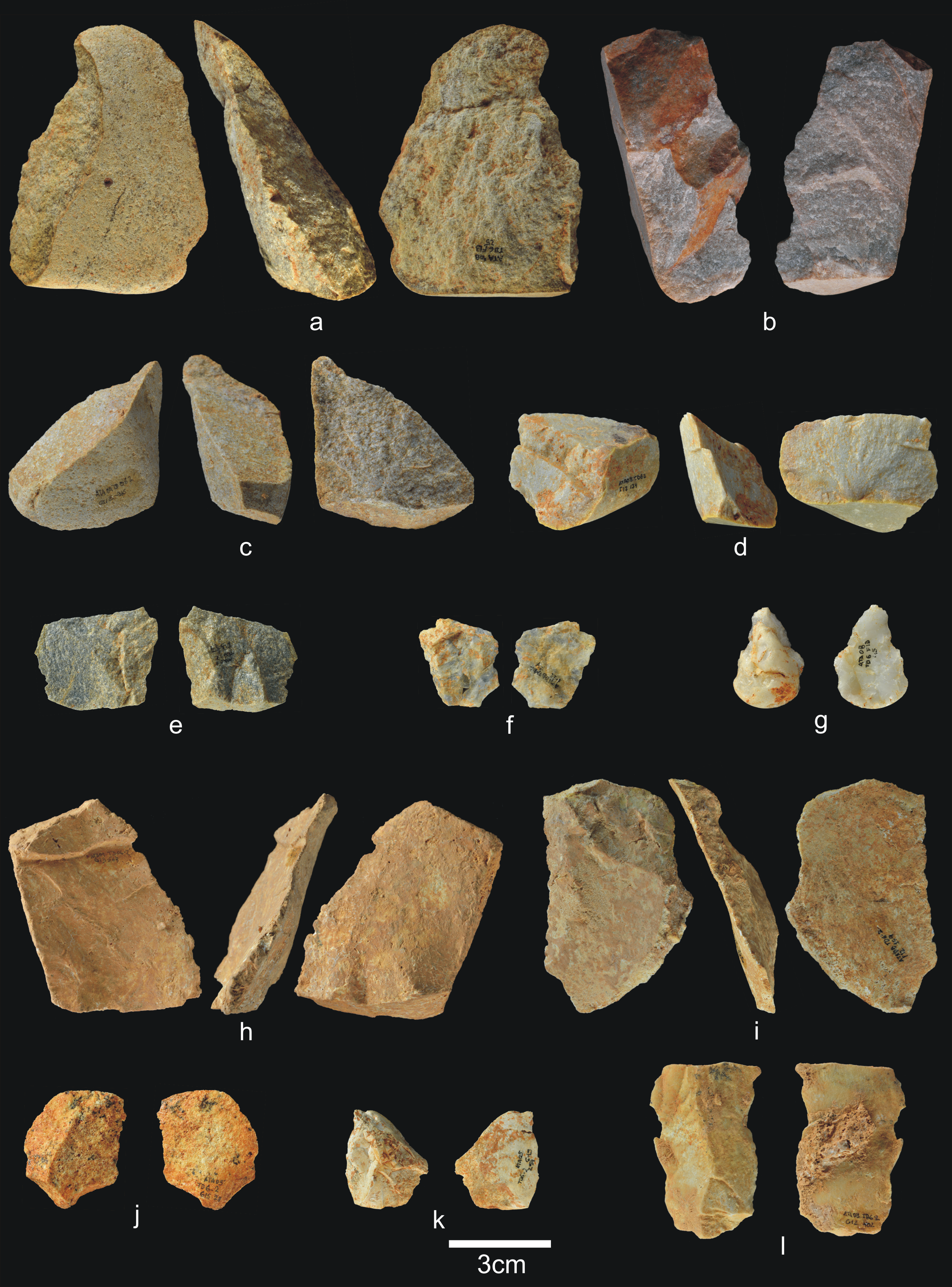
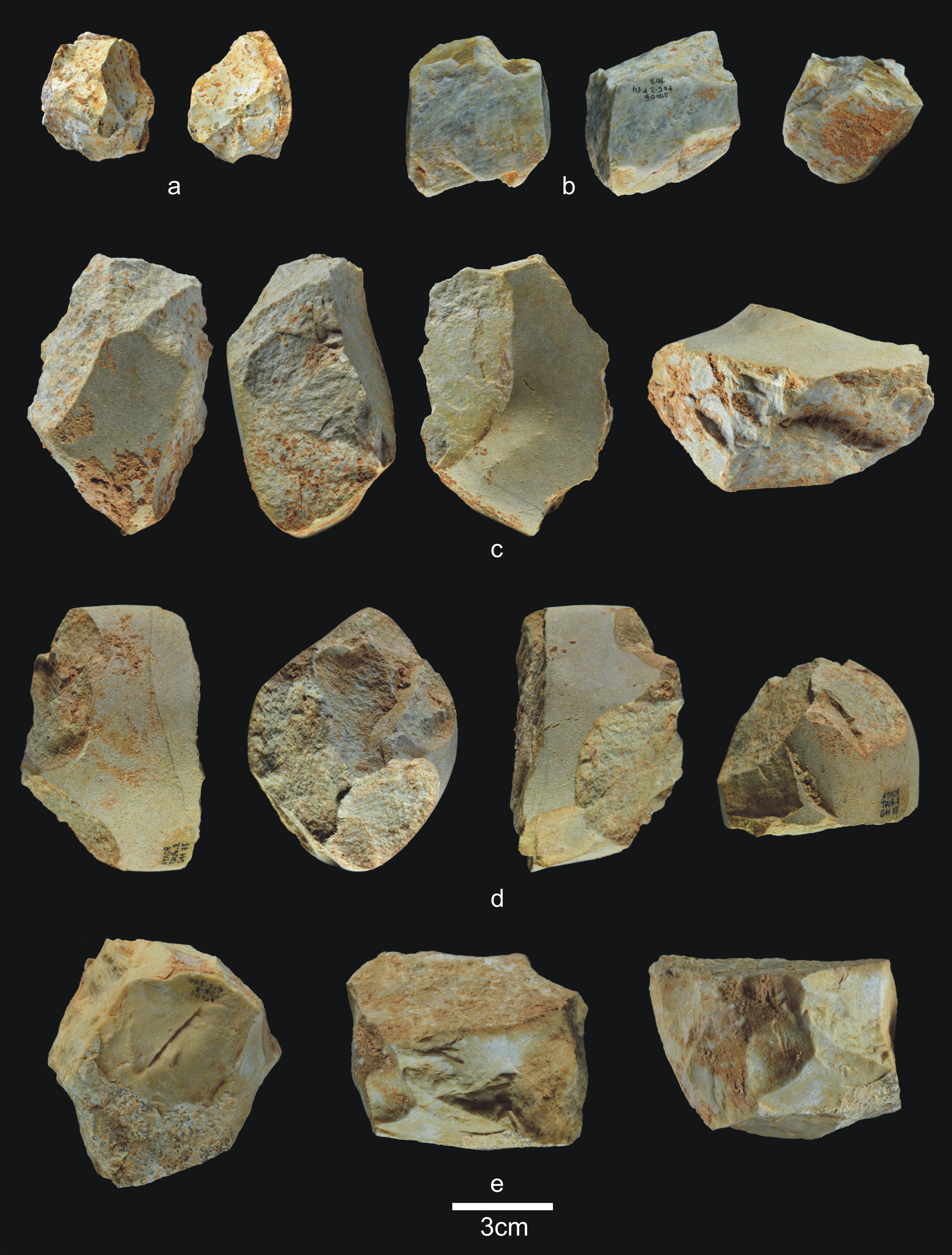
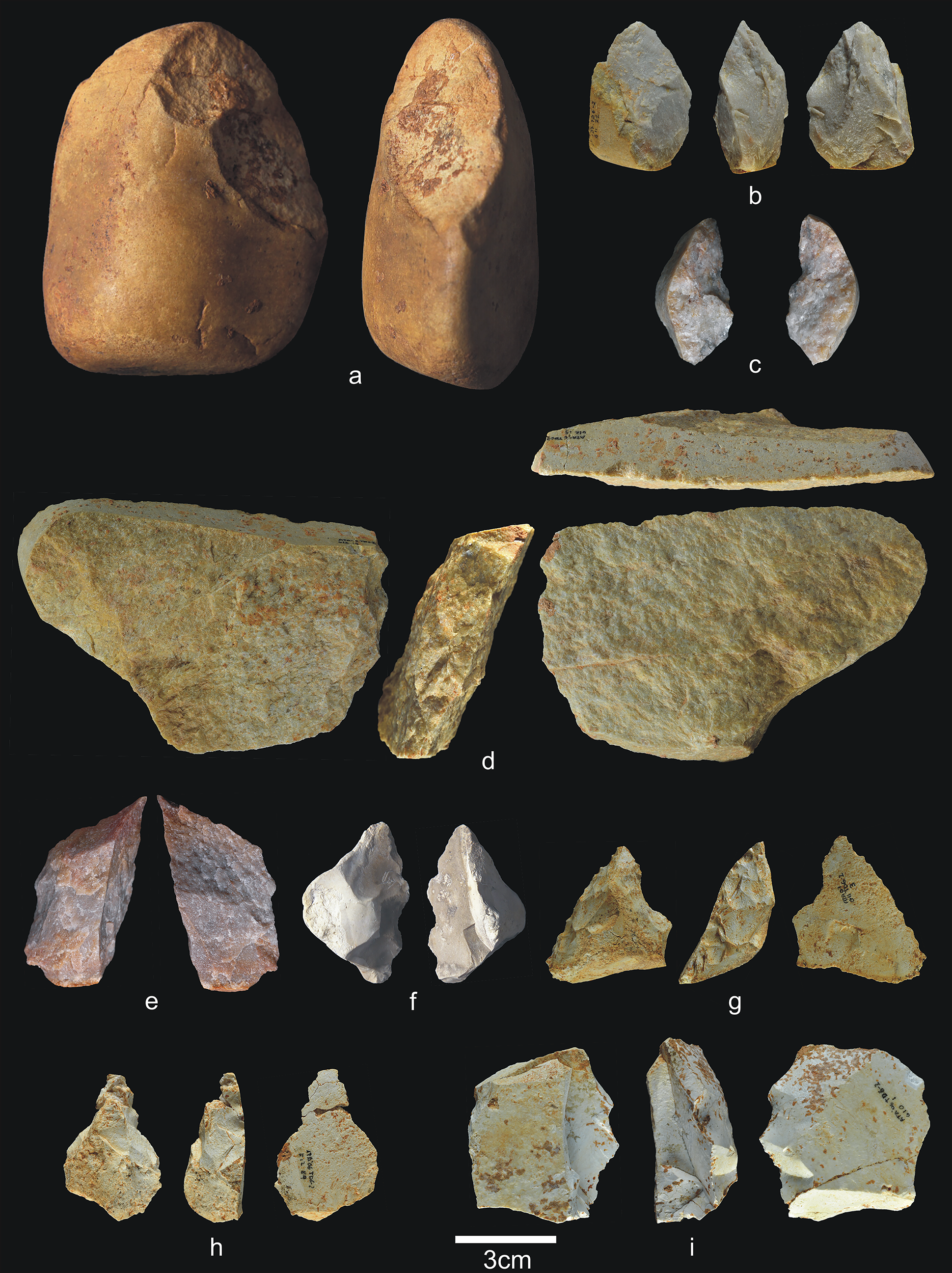
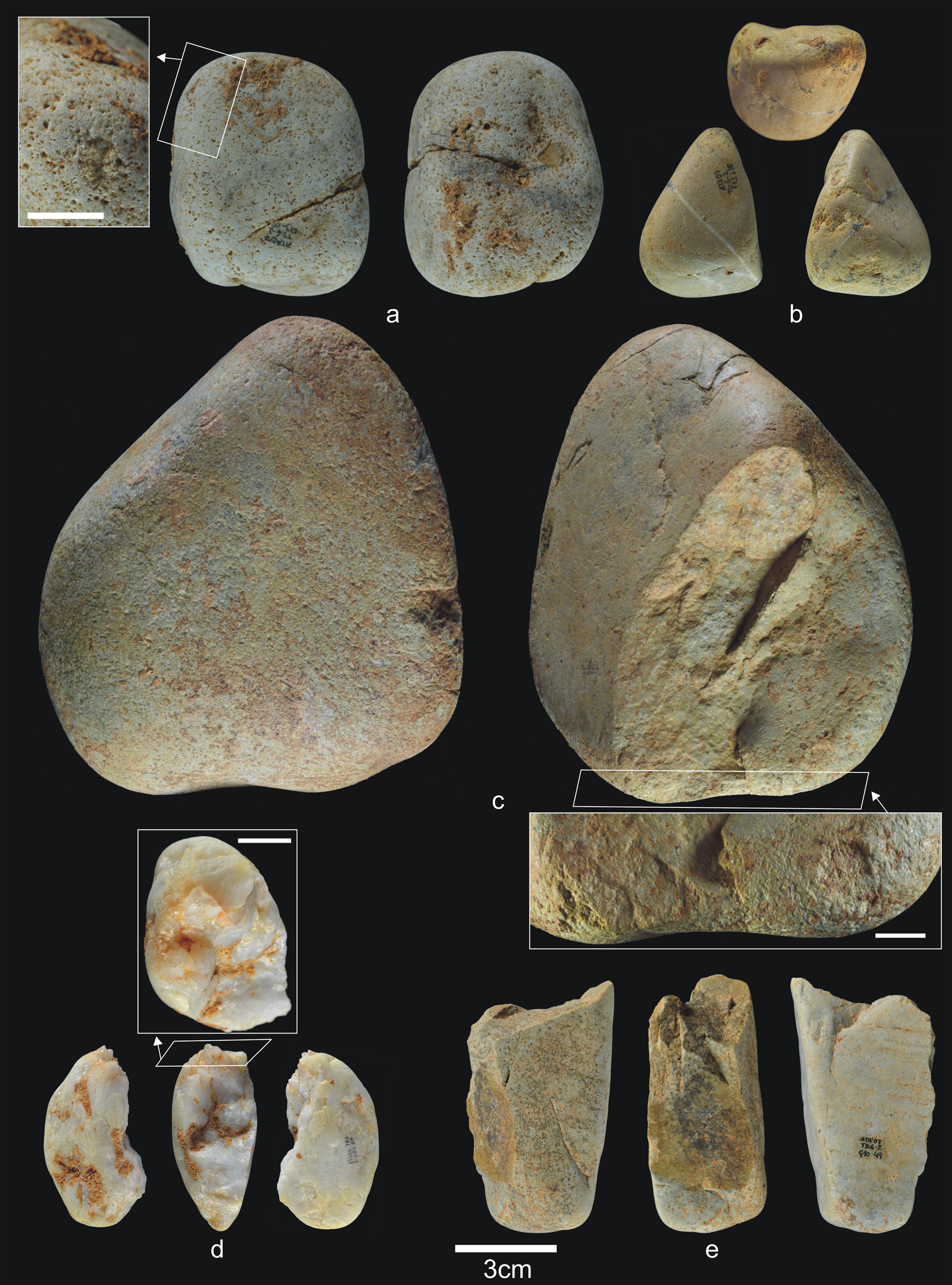
Stone tools from TD6.2, from the top left clockwise: simple flakes, cores, hammers, and retouched flakes as well as a chopper

Most of the stone tools resided in the lower (older) half of TD6.2, with 831 stone tools. The knappers made use of a much more diverse array of materials (although most commonly chert), which indicates they were moving farther out in search of better raw materials. The Sierra de Atapuerca features an abundance and diversity of mineral outcroppings suitable for stone tool manufacturing, in addition to chert and quartz namely quartzite, sandstone, and limestone, which could all be collected within only 3 km (1.9 mi) of the Gran Dolina.

They produced far fewer pebbles and spent more time knapping off flakes, but they were not particularly economic with their materials, and about half of the cores could have produced more flakes. They additionally modified irregular blanks into more workable shapes before flaking off pieces. This preplanning allowed them to use other techniques: the centripetal method (flaking off only the edges of the core) and the bipolar method (laying the core on an anvil and slamming it with a hammerstone). There are 62 flakes measuring below 20 mm (0.79 in) in height, and 28 above 60 mm (2.4 in). There are three conspicuously higher quality flakes, thinner and longer than the others, which may have been produced by the same person. There are also retouched tools: notches, spines, denticulates, points, scrapers, and a single chopper. These small retouched tools are rare in the European Early Pleistocene.

==== TD6.1 ====
TD6.1 yielded 124 stone tools, but they are badly preserved as the area was also used by hyenas as a latrine, the urine corroding the area. The layer lacks pebbles and cores, and 44 of the stone tools are indeterminate. Flakes are much smaller with an average of 28 mm × 27 mm × 11 mm (1.10 in × 1.06 in × 0.43 in), with ten measuring below 20 mm (0.79 in), and only three exceeding 60 mm (2.4 in).

They seem to have been using the same methods as the people who manufactured the TD6.2 tools. They were only retouching larger flakes, the fourteen such tools averaging 35 mm × 26 mm × 14 mm (1.38 in × 1.02 in × 0.55 in): one marginally retouched flake, one notch, three spines, seven denticulate sidescrapers, and one denticulate point.

=== Fire and palaeoclimate ===
Only a few charcoal particles have been collected from TD6, which probably originated from a fire well outside the cave. There is no evidence of any fire use or burnt bones (cooking) in the occupation sequences of the Gran Dolina. In other parts of the world, reliable evidence of fire usage does not surface in the archaeological record until roughly 400,000 years ago. In 2016, small mammal bones burned in fires exceeding 600 °C (1,112 °F) were identified from 780- to 980-thousand-year-old deposits at Cueva Negra in southern Spain, which potentially could have come from a human source as such a high temperature is usually (though not always) recorded in campfires as opposed to natural bushfires.

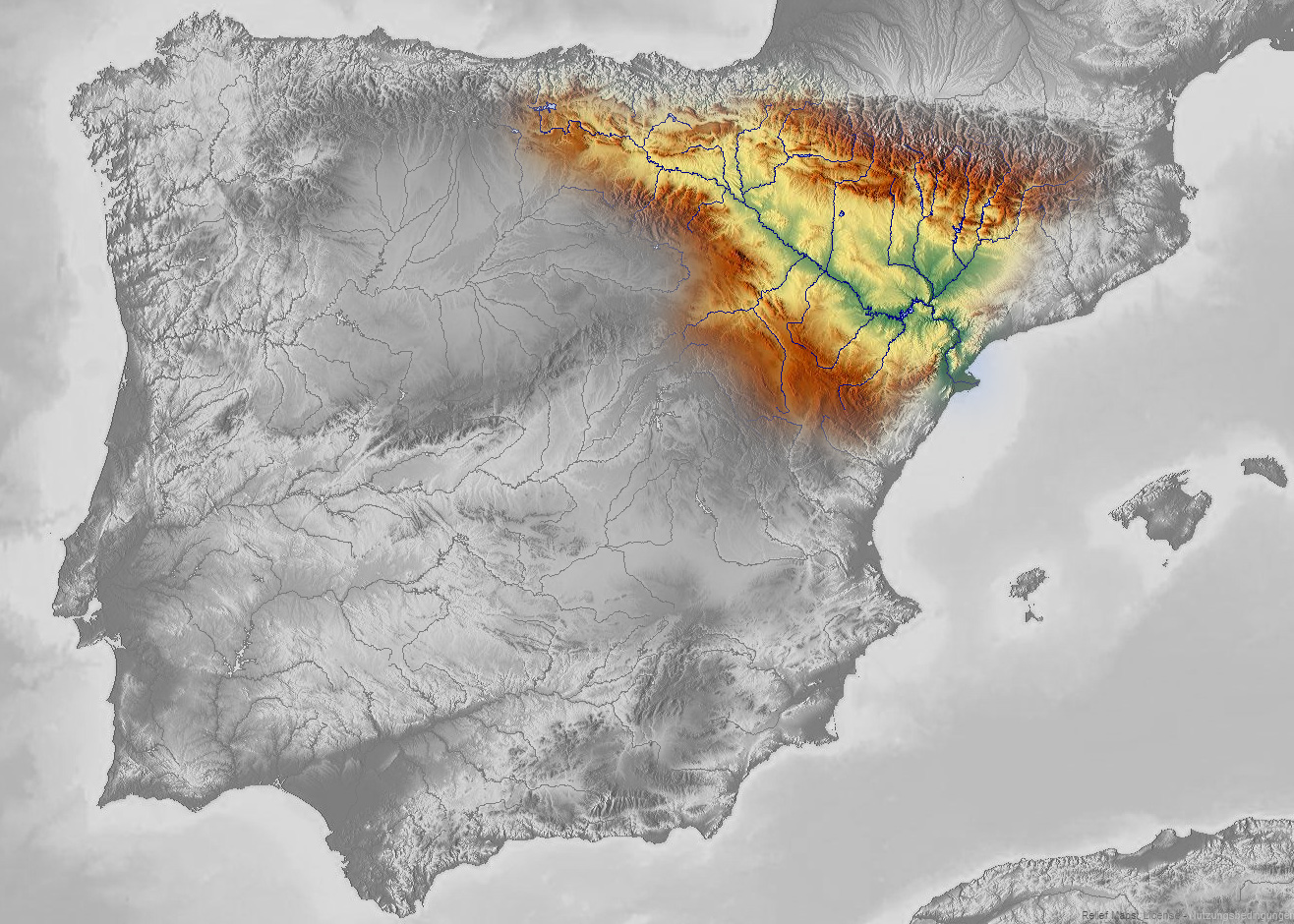
H. antecessor may have moved along the Ebro river highlighted above (the Sierra de Atapuerca lies near the source).

Instead of using fire, these early Europeans probably physiologically withstood the cold, such as by eating a high protein diet to support a heightened metabolism. Despite glacial cycles, the climate was probably similar or a few degrees warmer compared to that of today's, with the coldest average temperature reaching 2 °C (36 °F) sometime in December and January, and the hottest in July and August 18 °C (64 °F). Freezing temperatures could have been reached from November to March, but the presence of olive and oak suggests subfreezing was an infrequent occurrence. TE9 similarly indicates a generally warm climate. The Happisburgh footprints were left in estuarine mudflats with open forests dominated by pine, spruce, birch, and in wetter areas alder, with patches of heath and grasslands; the vegetation is consistent with the cooler beginning or end of an interglacial.

H. antecessor probably migrated from the Mediterranean shore into inland Iberia when colder glacial periods were transitioning to warmer interglacials, and warm grasslands dominated, vacating the region at any other time. They may have followed water bodies while migrating, in the case of Sierra de Atapuerca, most likely the Ebro River.

=== Food ===
The fossils of sixteen animal species were recovered randomly mixed with the H. antecessor material at the Gran Dolina, including the extinct bush-antlered deer, the extinct species of fallow deer Dama vallonetensi, the extinct subspecies of red deer Cervus elaphus acoronatus, the extinct bison Bison voigstedtensi, the extinct rhino Stephanorhinus etruscus, the extinct horse Equus stenonis, the extinct fox Vulpes praeglacialis, the extinct bear Ursus dolinensis, the extinct wolf Canis mosbachensis, the spotted hyena, the wild boar, and undetermined species of mammoth, monkey, and lynx. Some specimens of the former eight species and the monkey exhibit cut marks consistent with butchery, with about 13% of all Gran Dolina remains bearing some evidence of human modification. Deer are the most commonly butchered animal, with 106 specimens. The inhabitants seem to have carried carcasses back whole when feasible, and only the limbs and skulls of larger quarries. This indicates the Gran Dolina H. antecessor were dispatching hunting parties who killed and hauled back prey to share with the entire group rather than each individual foraging entirely for themselves, which evinces social cooperation and division of labour. Less than 5% of all the remains retain animal carnivore damage, in two instances toothmarks overlapping cutmarks from an unidentified animal, which could indicate animals were sometimes scavenging H. antecessor leftovers.

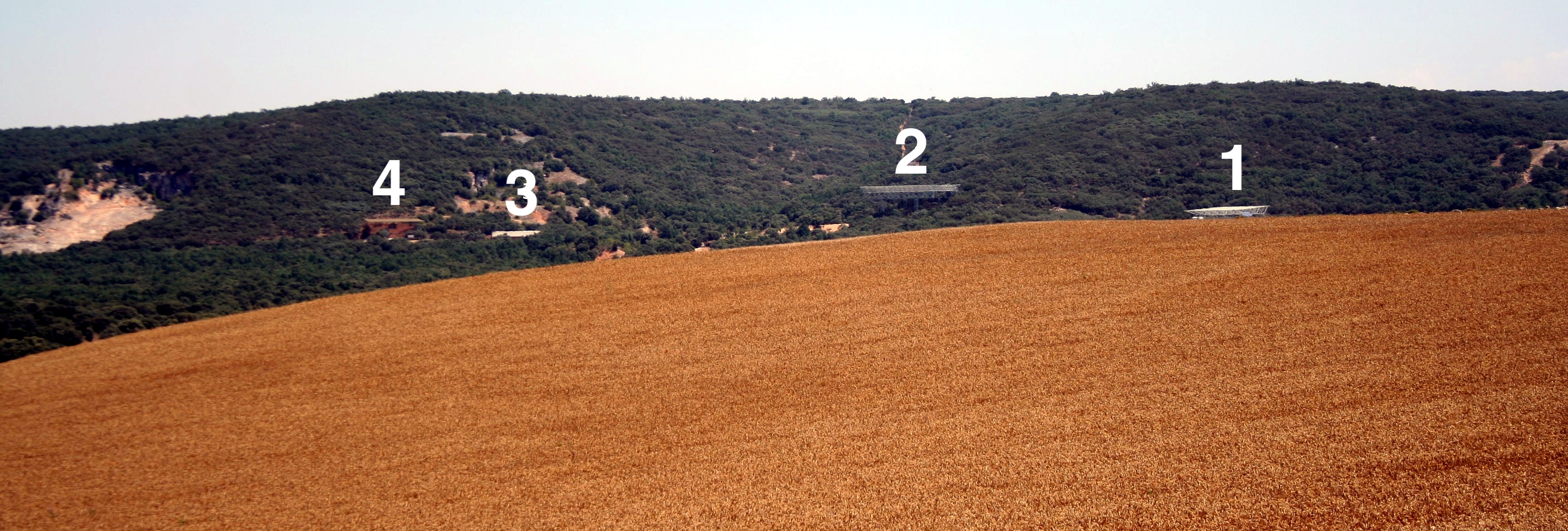
Sierra de Atapuerca today: 1) Entrance to railway ditch, 2) Sima del Elefante, 3) Galería, 4) Gran Dolina

The Sima del Elefante site records the fallow deer, the bush-antlered deer, rhinos, E. stenonis, C. mosbachensis, U. dolinensis, the extinct big cat Panthera gombaszogensis, the extinct lynx Lynx issiodorensis, the extinct fox Vulpes alopecoides, several rats, shrews, and rabbits, and undetermined species of macaques, boar, bison, and beaver. The large mammals are most commonly represented by long bones, a few of which are cracked open, presumably to access the bone marrow. Some others bear evidence of percussion and defleshing. They were also butchering Hermann's tortoise, an easily obtainable source of meat considering how slowly tortoises move.

The cool and humid montane environment encouraged the growth of olive, mastic, beech, hazelnut, and chestnut trees, which H. antecessor may have used as food sources, although they become more common in TD7 and TD8 as the interglacial progresses and the environment becomes wetter. In the H. antecessor unit TD6, pollen predominantly derives from juniper and oak. Trees probably grew along rivers and streams, while the rest of the hills and ridges were dominated by grasses. The TD6 individuals also seem to have been consuming hackberries, which in historical times have been used for their medicinal properties more than satiating hunger because these berries provide very little flesh.

There is no evidence H. antecessor could wield fire and cook, and similarly the wearing on the molars indicates the more frequent consumption of grittier and more mechanically challenging foods than later European species, such as raw rather than cooked meat and underground storage organs.

=== Cannibalism ===
Eighty young adult and child H. antecessor specimens from the Gran Dolina exhibit cut marks and fracturing indicative of cannibalism, and H. antecessor is the second-most common species bearing evidence of butchering. Human bodies were efficiently utilised, and may be the reason why most bones are smashed or otherwise badly damaged. There are no complete skulls, elements from the face and back of the skull are usually percussed, and the muscle attachments on the face and the base of the skull were cut off. The intense modification of the face was probably to access the brain. The crown of the head was probably struck, resulting in the impact scars on the teeth at the gum line. Several skull fragments exhibit peeling.

The ribs also bear cut marks along the muscle attachments consistent with defleshing, and ATD6-39 has cuts along the length of the rib, which may be related to disembowelment. The nape muscles were sliced off, and the head and neck were probably detached from the body. The vertebrae were often cut, peeled, and percussed. The muscles on all of the clavicles were sawed off to disconnect the shoulder. One radius, ATD6-43, was cut up and peeled. The femur was shattered, probably to extract the bone marrow. The hands and feet variably exhibit percussion, cutting, or peeling, likely a result of dismemberment.

In sum, mainly the meatier areas were prepared, and the rest discarded. This suggests they were butchering humans for nutritional purposes, but the face generally exhibits significantly more cutmarks than the faces of animals. When this is seen in prehistoric modern human specimens, it is typically interpreted as evidence of exocannibalism, a form of ritual cannibalism where one eats someone from beyond their social group, such as an enemy from a neighbouring tribe. But, when overviewing the evidence of H. antecessor cannibalism in 1999, Spanish palaeontologist Yolanda Fernandez-Jalvo and colleagues instead ascribed the relative abundance of facial cut marks in the H. antecessor sample to the strongly contrasting structure of the muscle attachments between humans and typical animal prey items (that is, defleshing the human face simply required more cuts, or the butcherers were less familiar with defleshing humans).

Nonetheless, the assemblage had a lack of older individuals, and was composed entirely of young adults and juveniles. In 2010 Carbonell hypothesised that they were practising exocannibalism and hunting down neighbouring tribesmen. While not rejecting this hypothesis, Spanish palaeoanthropologist Jesús Rodríguez and colleagues suggested as an alternative explanation that the eaten people may have been fellow tribesmen who had died of unrelated reasons (such as natural causes, war, or accidents), eaten in funerary rites or possibly simply to avoid wasting food. They consider this explanation as better fitting the demographic distribution of the eaten due to the high youth mortality rates in hunter-gatherer groups, while also granting that the high number of young individuals among the eaten may have been due to a "low-risk hunting strategy" (juveniles of foreign groups were easier to catch and kill) or a "deliberate cultural strategy aimed to defend the territory and eliminate competitors" by targeting their offspring.

== See also ==
- Ceprano Man – Prehistoric human skull cap from Italy
- Dmanisi hominins – Hominid species or subspecies discovered in Dmanisi, Georgia
- Early expansions of hominins out of Africa – First hominin expansion into Eurasia (2.1–0.1 Ma)
- Happisburgh footprints – Fossilized hominid footprints in Norfolk, England
- Homo heidelbergensis – Extinct species of archaic human
- Neanderthal – Extinct species of human
- Paleolithic Europe – Prehistoric period in Europe
- Tautavel Man – Homo erectus fossil
