= Stephanion =

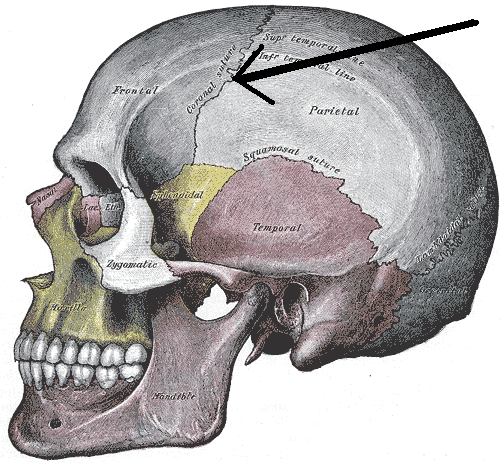
- Side view of the skull. (Stephanion visible at center top, but not labeled. Coronal suture is at tip of arrow, and stephanion is slightly above it.)

Details

Identifiers
- Latin: stephanion

The point where the upper temporal line cuts the coronal suture is named the stephanion.

The stephanion is found anterior to the euryon (the most lateral point of the skull), and hence, the supramarginal gyrus. The stephanion is located on the same coronal plane as Broca's area (Brodmann's area 44–45).
