= Poggiolo =

Poggiolo may refer to:

- Poggiolo, Corse-du-Sud, a commune in Corse-du-Sud, France
- Poggiolo (stream), a small coastal stream in Haute-Corse, France
- Monte Poggiolo, a hill near Forlì, Italy in the Emilia-Romagna area
