= History of the Mediterranean region =

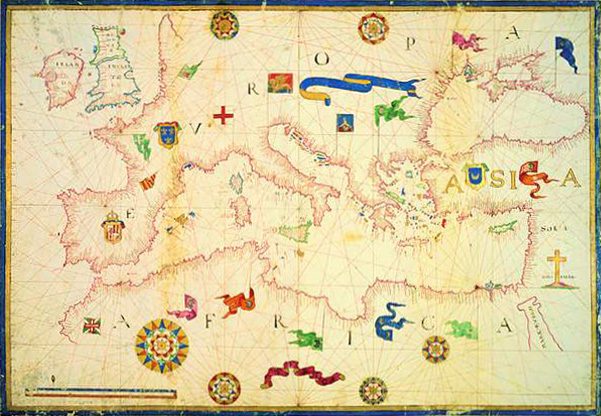
Bacino del Mediterraneo, dall'Atlante manoscritto del 1582–1584 ca. Biblioteca Nazionale Centrale Vittorio Emanuele II, Rome (cart. naut. 2 – cart. naut 6/1-2).

The history of the Mediterranean region and of the cultures and people of the Mediterranean Basin is important for understanding the origin and development of the Mesopotamian, Egyptian, Canaanite, Phoenician, Hebrew, Carthaginian, Mauretanian, Minoan, Greek, Persian, Illyrian, Thracian, Etruscan, Iberian, Roman, Byzantine, Bulgarian, Arab, Berber, Ottoman, Christian, and Islamic cultures. The Mediterranean Sea was the central superhighway of transport, trade and cultural exchange between diverse peoples encompassing three continents: Western Asia, Northern Africa, and Southern Europe.

== Early history ==
The Fertile Crescent in the 2nd millennium BC.

Lézignan-la-Cèbe in France, Orce in Spain, Monte Poggiolo in Italy and Kozarnika in Bulgaria are amongst the oldest Paleolithic sites in Europe and are located around the Mediterranean Basin.

There is evidence of stone tools on Crete in 130,000 years BC, which indicates that early humans were capable of using boats to reach the island.

The cultural stage of civilization (organised society structured around urban centers) first arises in Southwest Asia, as an extension of the Neolithic trend, from as early as the 8th millennium BC, of proto-urban centers such as Çatalhöyük. Urban civilizations proper begin to emerge in the Chalcolithic, in 5th-to-4th-millennium Egypt and in Mesopotamia.

The Black Sea area is a cradle of the European civilization. The site of Solnitsata (5500 BC - 4200 BC) is believed to be the oldest town in Europe - prehistoric fortified (walled) stone settlement (prehistoric city). The first gold artifacts in the world appear from the 5th millennium BC, such as those found in a burial site from 4569 to 4340 BC and one of the most important archaeological sites in world prehistory – the Varna Necropolis near Lake Varna in Bulgaria, thought to be the earliest "well-dated" find of gold artifacts.

As of 1990, gold artifacts found at the Wadi Qana cave cemetery of the 4th millennium BC in the West Bank were the earliest from the Levant.

The Bronze Age arises in this region during the final centuries of the 4th millennium BC. The urban civilizations of the Fertile Crescent now have writing systems and develop bureaucracy, by the mid-3rd millennium leading to the development of the earliest empires. In the 2nd millennium, the eastern coastlines of the Mediterranean are dominated by the Hittite and Egyptian empires, competing for control over the city states in the Levant (Canaan). The Minoans are trading throughout much of the Mediterranean.

The Bronze Age collapse is the transition from the Late Bronze Age to the Early Iron Age, expressed by the collapse of palace economies of the Aegean and Anatolia, which were replaced after a hiatus by the isolated village cultures of the ancient Near East. Some have gone so far as to call the catalyst that ended the Bronze Age a "catastrophe". The Bronze Age collapse may be seen in the context of a technological history that saw the slow, comparatively continuous spread of iron-working technology in the region, beginning with precocious iron-working in what is now Romania in the 13th and 12th centuries. The cultural collapse of the Mycenaean kingdoms, the Hittite Empire in Anatolia and Syria, and the Egyptian Empire in Syria and Israel, the scission of long-distance trade contacts and sudden eclipse of literacy occurred between 1206 and 1150 BC. In the first phase of this period, almost every city between Troy and Gaza was violently destroyed, and often left unoccupied thereafter (for example, Hattusas, Mycenae, Ugarit). The gradual end of the Dark Age that ensued saw the rise of settled Neo-Hittite Aramaean kingdoms of the mid-10th century BC, and the rise of the Neo-Assyrian Empire.

While the cultural advances during the Bronze Age had mostly been confined to the eastern parts of the Mediterranean, with the Iron Age, the entire coastal region surrounding the Mediterranean now becomes involved, significantly due to the Phoenician expansion from the Levant, beginning in ca. the 12th century. Fernand Braudel remarked in The Perspective of the World that Phoenicia was an early example of a "world-economy" surrounded by empires. The high point of Phoenician culture and sea power is usually placed ca. 1200–800 BC. Many of the most important Phoenician settlements had been established long before this: Byblos, Tyre, Sidon, Simyra, Arwad, and Berytus, all appear in the Amarna tablets.

The Phoenicians and the Assyrians transported elements of the Late Bronze Age culture of the Near East to Iron Age Greece and Italy, but also further afield to the northern Maghreb and to Iberia, initiating the beginning of Mediterranean history now known as Classical Antiquity. They notably spread alphabetic writing, which would become the hallmark of the Mediterranean civilizations of the Iron Age, in contrast to the cuneiform writing of Assyria and the logographic system in the Far East (and later the abugida systems of India).

== Classical antiquity ==
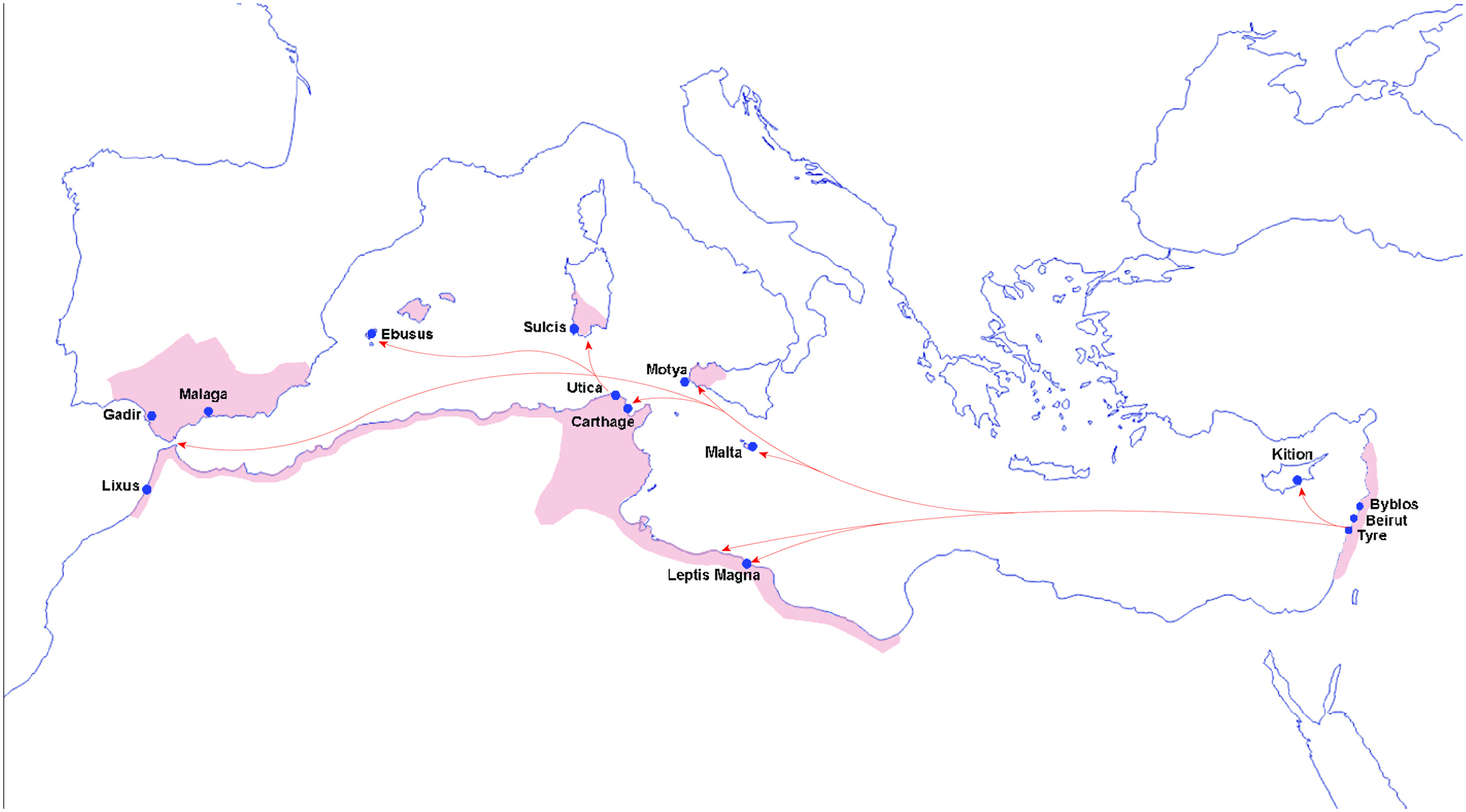
Phoenician settlements and trade routes across the Mediterranean starting from around 800 B.C.E

Greek territories and colonies during the Archaic period (750–550 BC)

Two of the most notable Mediterranean civilizations in classical antiquity were the Greek city-states and the Phoenicians, whose cities were also city-states. The Greeks spread to the shores of the Black Sea, Southern Italy (the so-called "Magna Graecia"), Gaul, and Asia Minor. The Phoenicians spread through the western Mediterranean to the northern Maghreb (present-day Morocco and Algeria), and the Iberian Peninsula, beyond the Strait of Gibraltar. From the 6th century BC to the 5th century BC, many of Mediterranean peoples were under Persian rule, making them dominate the Mediterranean during these years. Both the Phoenicians and some of the Greek city states in Asia Minor provided the naval forces of the Achaemenid Persian Empire. Persian dominance ended after the Greco-Persian War in the 5th century BC and Persia was crippled by Macedonia in the 4th century BC. The Odrysian Kingdom existed between the 5th century BC and the 1st century AD as the most important and powerful thracian state formation.

=== Persian period ===
From the 6th century BC to including the first half of the 4th century BC, many of the significant Mediterranean peoples came under Achaemenid Persian rule, making them dominate the Mediterranean during all these years. The empire, founded by Cyrus the Great, would include Macedonia, Thrace, and the western Black Sea coast (modern day southeastern and eastern Bulgaria), Egypt, Anatolia, the Phoenician lands, the Levant, and many other basin regions of the Mediterranean later on. Darius the Great (Darius I) is to be credited as the first Achaemenid king to invest in a Persian fleet. Even by then no true "imperial navy" had existed either in Greece or Egypt. Persia would become the first empire, under Darius, to inaugurate and deploy the first regular imperial navy. Both the Phoenicians and the Greeks provided the bulk of the naval forces of the Achaemenid Persian Empire, alongside the Cypriots and Egyptians. Full Persian dominance in the Mediterranean ended after the Greco-Persian War in the 5th century BC, and Persia eventually lost all her influence in the Mediterranean in the late 4th century BC following Alexander's conquests.

=== Hellenistic period ===
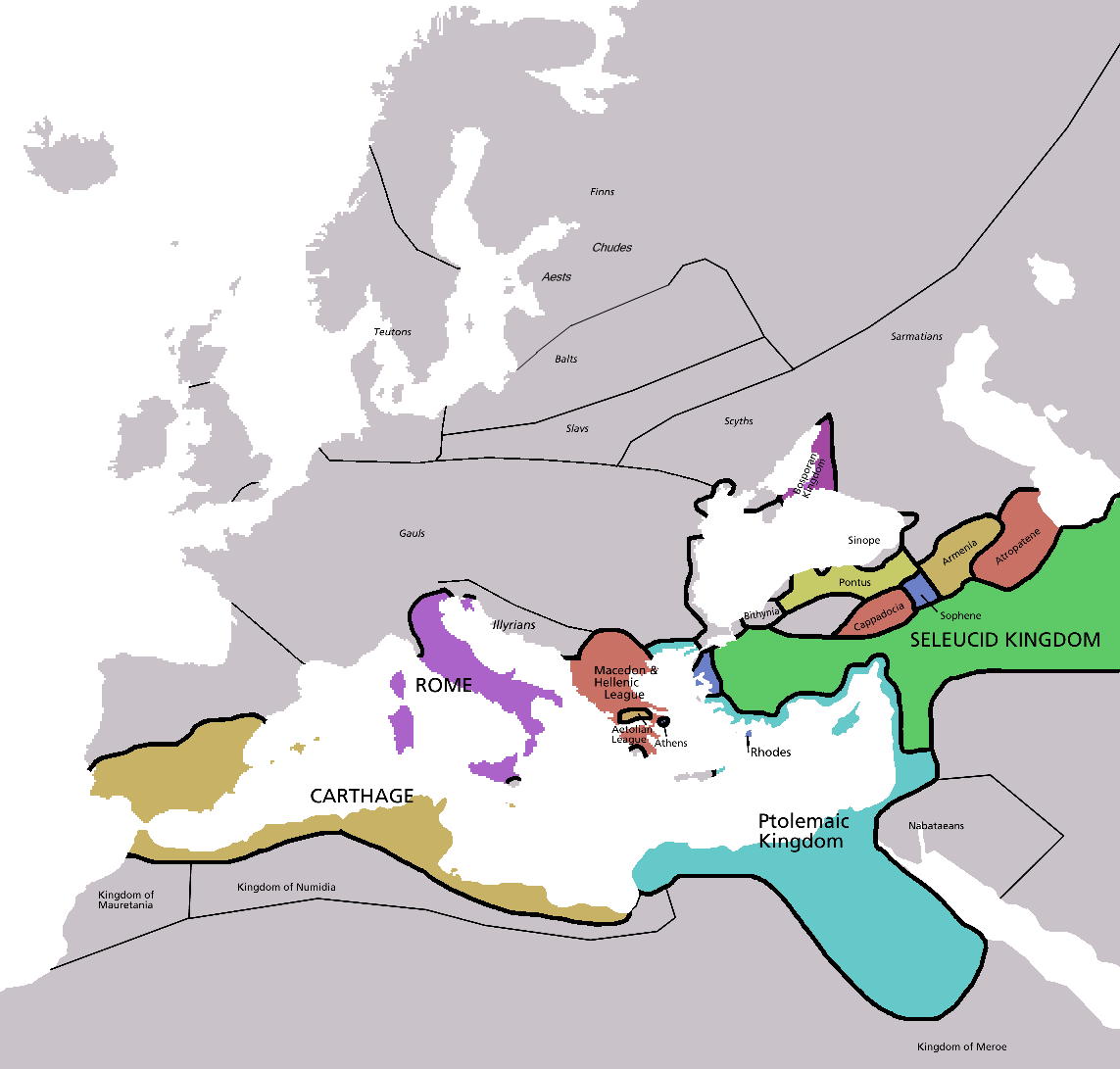
The Mediterranean region in 220 BC.

In the northernmost part of ancient Greece, in the ancient kingdom of Macedonia, technological and organizational skills were forged with a long history of cavalry warfare. The hetairoi (Companion cavalry) was considered the strongest of their time. Under Alexander the Great, this force turned east, and in a series of decisive battles, it routed the Persian forces and took over as the dominant empire of the Mediterranean. Their Macedonia empire included present-day Greece, Bulgaria, Egypt, the Phoenician lands, and many other basin regions of the Mediterranean and Asia Minor.

The major centres of the Mediterranean at the time became part of Alexander's empire as a result. His empire quickly disintegrated, and the Levant, Egypt, and Greece were soon again independent. Alexander's conquests spread Greek knowledge and ideas throughout the region.

Research indicates that between 1,500 BC and 200 BC, the sea level was around 2.5 metres below current levels and rose rapidly to present levels between 200 BC and 200 AD.

=== Roman–Carthaginian rivalry ===
These eastern powers soon began to be overshadowed by those farther west. In the Maghreb, the former Phoenician colony of Carthage rose to dominate its surroundings with an empire that contained many of the former Phoenician holdings. However, it was a city on the Italian Peninsula, Rome, that would eventually dominate the entire Mediterranean basin. Spreading first through Italy, Rome defeated Carthage in the Punic Wars, despite Hannibal's famous efforts against Rome in the Second Punic War.

After the Third Punic War, Rome then became the leading force in the western Mediterranean region. The Romans soon spread east, taking Greece, spreading Latin knowledge and thought throughout the regions. By this point the coastal trading cultures were thoroughly dominant over the inland river valleys that had once been the heart of the great powers. Egyptian power moved from the Nile cities to the coastal ones, especially Alexandria. Mesopotamia became a fringe border region between the Roman Empire and the Persians.

=== Roman Mare Nostrum ===
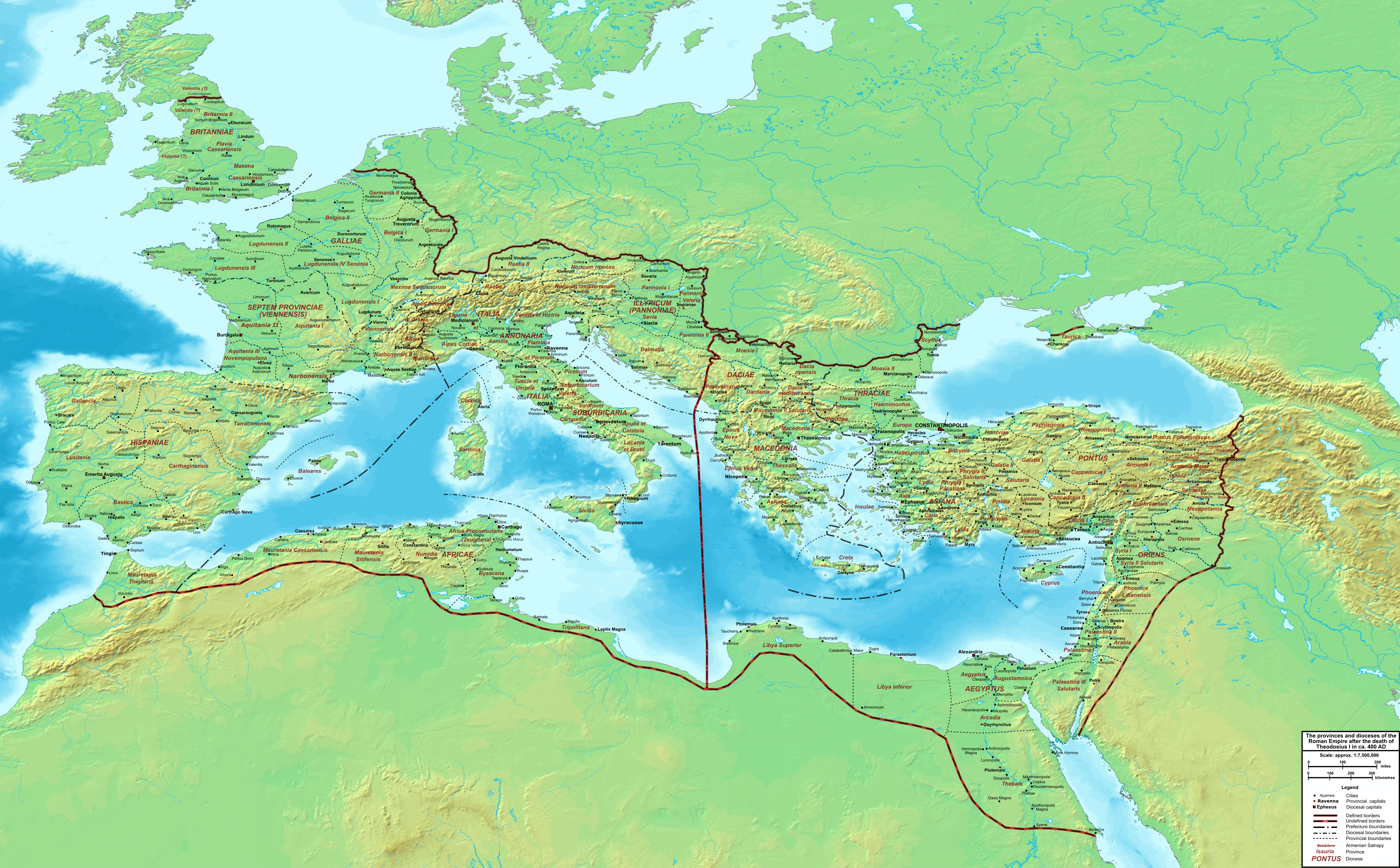
The Mare nostrum, surrounded by Roman territory in c. 400 AD.

When Augustus founded the Roman Empire, the Mediterranean Sea began to be called Mare Nostrum (Latin: "Our Sea") by the Romans. Their empire was centered on this sea and all the area was full of commerce and naval development. For the first time in history, an entire sea (the Mediterranean) was free of piracy. For several centuries, the Mediterranean was a "Roman Lake", surrounded on all sides by the empire.

The empire began to crumble in the 3rd century. It recovered briefly, only to begin its decline again. By 435 AD it had lost present-day southern France and Iberia to the Visigoths, and much of the northern Maghreb (all coastal Roman provinces east of Morocco) to the Vandals, thus ending its monopoly over the Mediterranean coast. Despite this, the Roman Empire did not collapse until 29 May 1453 AD.

=== Sasanian and Byzantine times ===
The Eastern Roman or Byzantine Empire began its domination of the Levant during its wars with neighbouring Sassanid Persia. The rule through the 6th century AD saw climatic instability, causing inconsistent production, distribution, and a general economic decline. The Sasanians were able to intrude into Mediterranean land regularly, but the Eastern Romans remained superior in the Mediterranean sea for centuries. In the first quarter of the 7th century CE, the Sasanians took swaths of the Mediterranean region from the Eastern Romans during the Byzantine–Sasanian War of 602–628, though the Sasanians lost territories by the end of the war. Ultimately, Byzantine domination in the region was forever finished by invasions of the Arabs and later the Turks.

== Middle Ages ==
The expansion of the Caliphate in the Mediterranean region from 622 to 750 AD. Expansion under Muhammad, 622–632 Expansion during the Rashidun Caliphate, 632–661 Expansion during the Umayyad Caliphate, 661–750

=== Early Arab (Islamic) period ===
Another power was rising in the east, that of Islam, whilst the Eastern Roman Empire and Sassanid Persian empires were both weakened by centuries of stalemate warfare during the Roman–Persian Wars. In a series of rapid Muslim conquests, the Arab armies, motivated by Islam and led by the Caliphs and skilled military commanders such as Khalid ibn al-Walid, swept through most of the Middle East; reducing Byzantine lands by more than half and completely engulfing the Persian lands.

The Arab invasions disrupted the trade relations between Western and Eastern Europe while cutting the trade route with Oriental lands. This however had the indirect effect of promoting the trade across the Caspian Sea. The export of grains from Egypt was re-routed towards the Eastern world. Oriental goods like silk and spices were carried from Egypt to ports like Venice and Constantinople by sailors and Jewish merchants. The Viking raids further disrupted the trade in western Europe and brought it to a halt. However, the Norsemen developed the trade from Norway to the White Sea, while also trading in luxury goods from Spain and the Mediterranean. The Byzantines in the mid-8th century retook control of the area around the north-eastern part of the Mediterranean. Venetian ships from the 9th century armed themselves to counter the harassment by Arabs while concentrating trade of oriental goods at Venice.

The powerful and long-lived Bulgarian Empire was the main European rival in the region of the Mediterranean Balkan Peninsula between the 7th and the 14th centuries, creating an important cultural, political, linguistic and religious legacy during the Middle Ages.

In Anatolia, the Muslim expansion was blocked by the still capable Byzantines with the help of the Tervel of Bulgaria. The Byzantine provinces of Roman Syria, North Africa, and Sicily, however, could not mount such a resistance, and the Muslim conquerors swept through those regions. At the far west, they crossed the sea taking Visigothic Hispania before being halted in southern France by the Franks. At its greatest extent, the Arab Empire controlled three-quarters of the Mediterranean coast, and fostered an economic interrelationship between the Indian Ocean and Mediterranean. Much of North Africa became a peripheral area to the main Muslim centers in the Middle East, but Al Andalus and Morocco soon broke from this distant control and became highly advanced societies in their own right.

Between 831 and 1071, the Emirate of Sicily was one of the major centres of Islamic culture in the Mediterranean. After its conquest by the Christian Normans, the island developed its own distinct culture with the fusion of Latin and Byzantine influences. Palermo remained a leading artistic and commercial centre of the Mediterranean well into the Middle Ages.

Map of the main Byzantine-Muslim naval operations and battles in the Mediterranean, 7th to 11th centuries

The Fatimids maintained trade relations with the Italian city-states like Amalfi and Genoa before the Crusades, according to the Cairo Geniza documents. A document dated 996 mentions Amalfian merchants living in Cairo. Another letter states that the Genoese had traded with Alexandria. The caliph al-Mustansir had allowed Amalfian merchants to reside in Jerusalem about 1060 in place of the Latin hospice.

=== Muslim–Christian rivalry ===
More organized and centralized states gradually began to form in Europe during the later Middle Ages. Motivated by religion and dreams of conquest, the kings of Europe launched a number of Crusades to try to roll back Muslim power and retake the Holy Land. The Crusades were unsuccessful in this goal, but they were far more effective in weakening the already tottering Byzantine Empire that began to lose increasing amounts of territory to the Seljuk Turks and later to the Ottoman Turks. They also rearranged the balance of power in the Muslim world as Egypt once again emerged as a major power in the eastern Mediterranean.

The Crusades led to flourishing of trade between Europe and the outremer region. Genoa, Venice and Pisa created colonies in regions controlled by the Crusaders and came to control the trade with the Orient. These colonies also allowed them to trade with the Eastern world. Though the fall of the Crusader states and attempts at banning of trade relations with Muslim states by the Popes temporarily disrupted the trade with the Orient, it however continued.

The Zirid state in eastern Maghreb developed around the great metropolis of Kairouan collapsed in mid 12th century, with a henceforth fragmented Ifriqiya becoming a ground for competing external powers from then on. The high Middle Ages also saw the successive rise of two Berber powers, the Almoravids and the Almohads, in the Western Maghreb, fostering the developments of cities such as Marrakesh and Fez upon their control over Trans-Saharan trade. Cities in southern Iberia such as Almería (under Almoravid rule) also thrived in the High Middle Ages. The 12th century also saw increasing naval and trading progress on the part of Christian powers in the northern shores of the Mediterranean (including Genoa, Pisa, and Aragon), seemingly offering a challenge to the balance of power in the Western Mediterranean.

=== Slavery ===
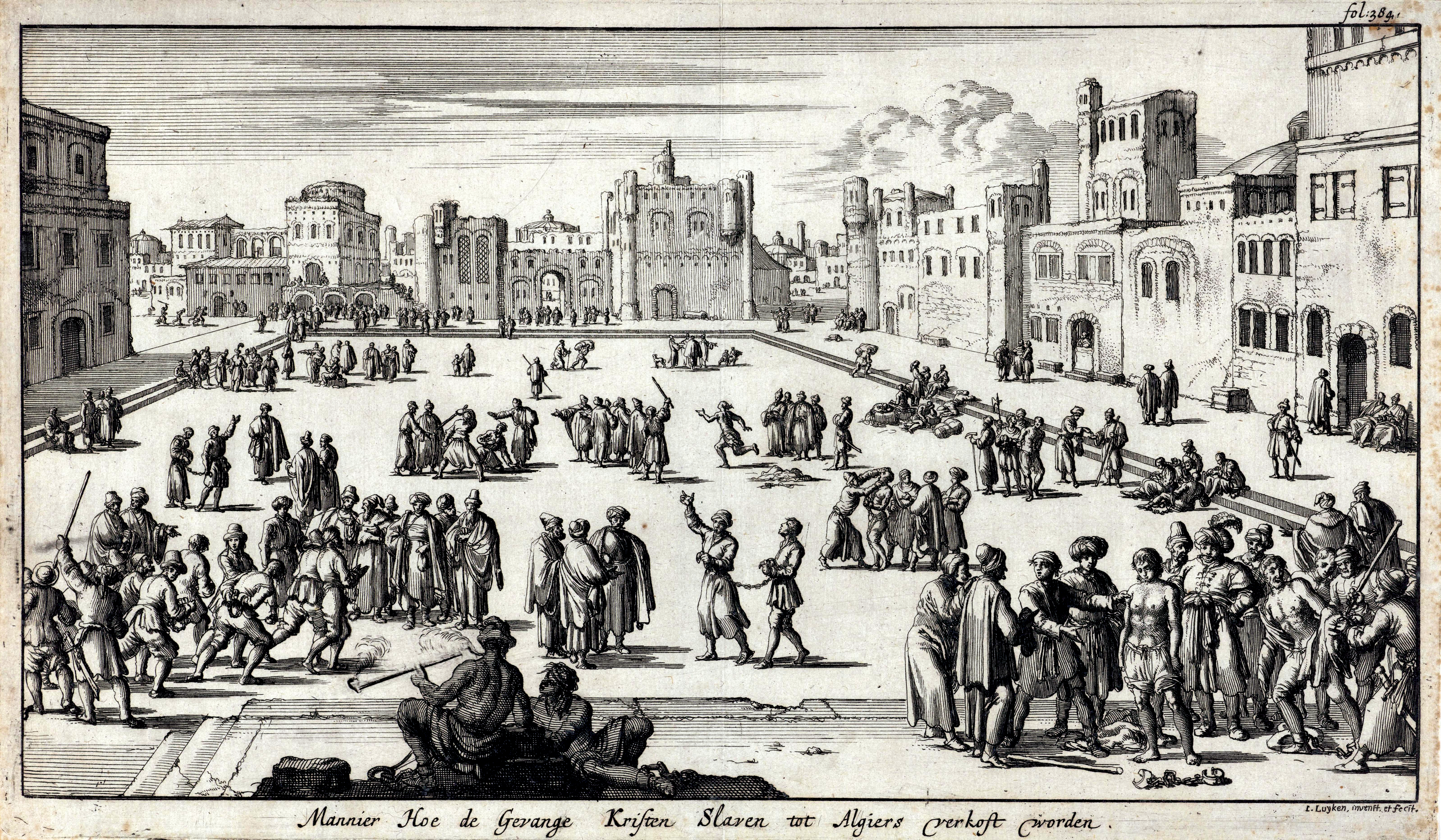
Slave market in Algiers, c. 1684

Slavery was a strategic and very important part of all Mediterranean societies during the Middle Ages. The threat of becoming a slave was a constant fear for peasants, fishermen and merchants. Those with money or who had financial backing only feared the lack of support, should they be threatened with abduction for ransom.

There were several things which could happen to people in the Mediterranean region of the Middle Ages:

1. When Corsairs, pirate, Barbary corsairs, French corsairs or commerce raiders plied their trade, a peasant, fisherman or coastal villager, who had no financial backing, could be abducted or sold to slave traders, or adversaries, who made large profits on an international market;
2. If the captive was wealthy or had influential supporters, the captive could be ransomed. This would be the most advantageous plan, since the money exchange was immediate and direct, not long and drawn out as in the slave market business;
3. The captive could be used immediately by the corsair for labour on the ship rather than traded. In battles during this era, prisoners of war were often captured and used as slaves.

Emperors would take large numbers of prisoners, parade them through the capital, hold feasts in honour of their capture and parade diplomats in front of them as a display of victory.

=== Late Middle Ages ===
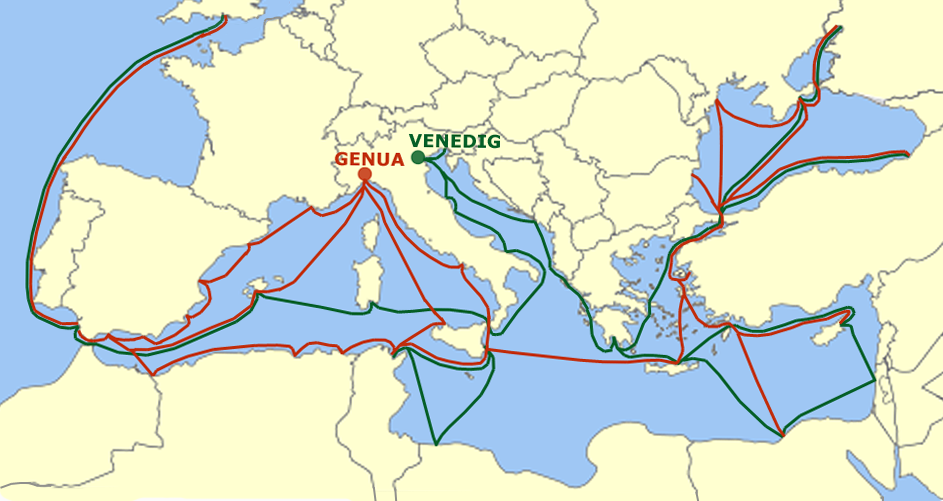
Genoese (red) and Venetian (green) maritime trade routes in the Mediterranean.

The "Repubbliche Marinare" (Maritime republics) of Amalfi, Gaeta, Venice, Genoa, Ancona, Pisa and Ragusa developed their own empires in the Mediterranean shores. The Islamic states had never been major naval powers, and trade from the east to Europe was soon in the hands of Italian traders, especially the Genoese and the Venetians, who profited immensely from it. The Republic of Pisa and later the Republic of Ragusa used diplomacy to further trade and maintained a libertarian approach in civil matters to further sentiment in its inhabitants.

The Republic of Venice got to dominate the eastern mediterranean shores after the Fourth Crusade.

Between 1275 and 1344 a struggle for the control of the Strait of Gibraltar took place. Featuring the Marinid Sultanate, the Nasrid Kingdom of Granada, the Crown of Castile, the Crown of Aragón, the Kingdom of Portugal and the Republic of Genoa, it was characterized by changing alliances between the main actors. The iberian cities of Tarifa, Ceuta, Algeciras or Ronda and the African port of Ceuta were at stake. The Western Mediterranean sea was dominated by the Crown of Aragon: thanks to their possessions of Sicily, the Kingdom of Naples, the Kingdom of Sardinia, the Balearic Islands, the Duchy of Athens the Duchy of Neopatria, and several northern African cities.

In 1347 the Black Death spread from Constantinople across the mediterranean basin.

Ottoman power continued to grow, and in 1453, the Byzantine Empire was extinguished with the fall of Constantinople. The Ottomans already controlled Greece, Bulgaria and much of the Balkans and soon also began to spread through North Africa. North Africa had grown wealthy from the trade across the Sahara Desert, but the Portuguese, who, along with other Christian powers, had been engaged in a long campaign to evict the Muslims from Iberia, had found a method to circumvent this trade by trading directly with West Africa. This was enabled by a new type of ships, the caravel, that made trade in the rough Atlantic waters profitable for the first time. The reduction in the Saharan trade weakened North Africa and made them an easy target for the Ottomans.

Ceuta was ultimately taken by the Kingdom of Portugal in 1415, searching to undermine Castilian, Aragonese, and Genoese interests in the area.

During the Middle Ages, rival Christian and Muslim kingdoms forbade the trade of particular goods to enemy kingdoms including weaponry and other contraband items. The popes forbade the export of these commodities to the Islamic world. The Ottomans too forbade the export of weapons and other strategic items, declaring them memnu eşya or memnu olan to Christian states even in peace treaties, however friendly states could import some of the prohibited goods through capitulations. Despite these prohibitions, trade of contraband occurred on both sides. The European merchants traded in illegal goods with Muslims. The Ottomans were unable to suppress the trade with smuggling being undertaken mainly in the winter when the Ottoman Navy stationed at the Istanbul Arsenal was unable to stop Ottoman and non-Ottoman vessels from indulging in the trade.

== Modern era ==
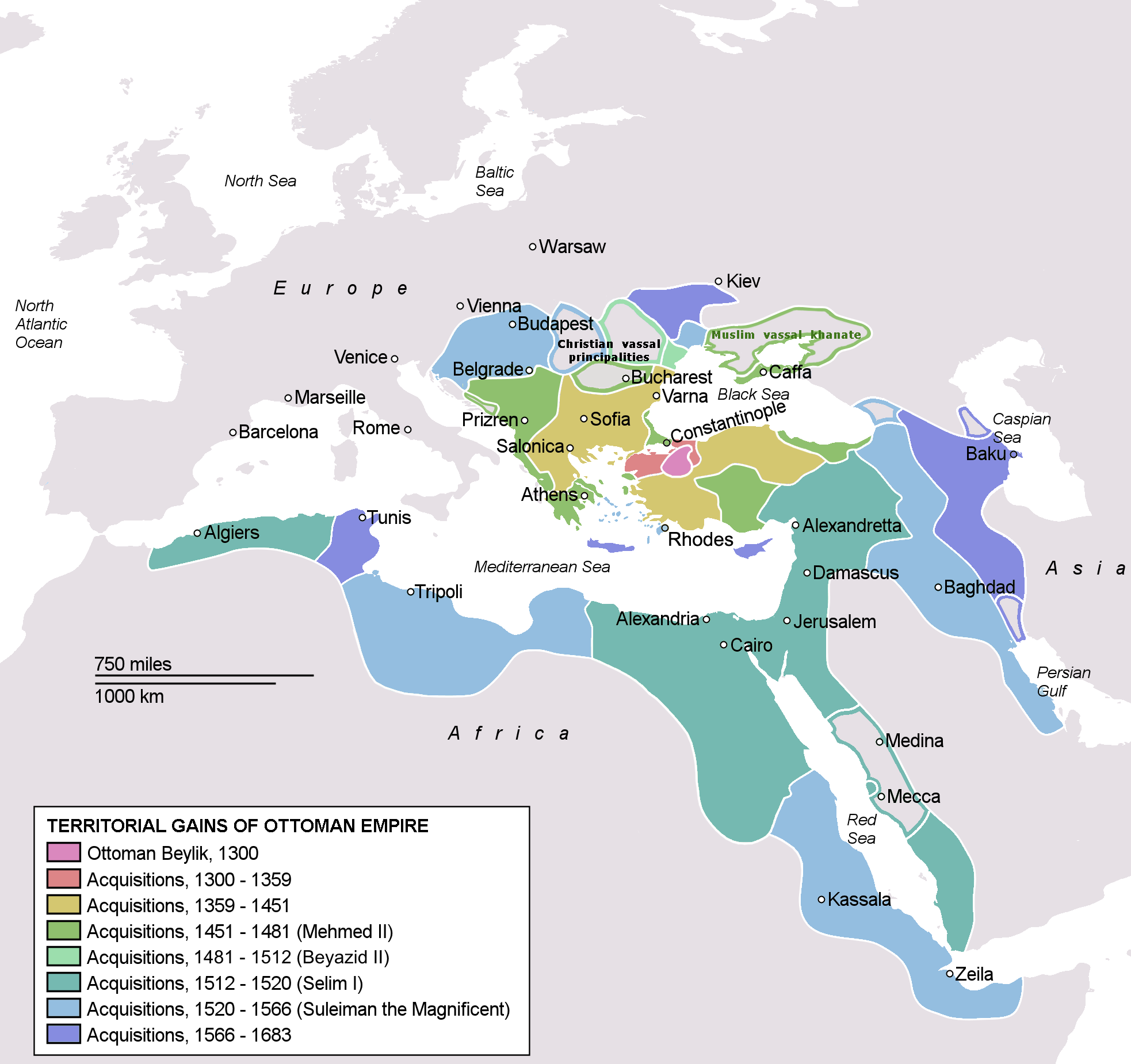
Ottoman Empire territories acquired between 1300 and 1683.

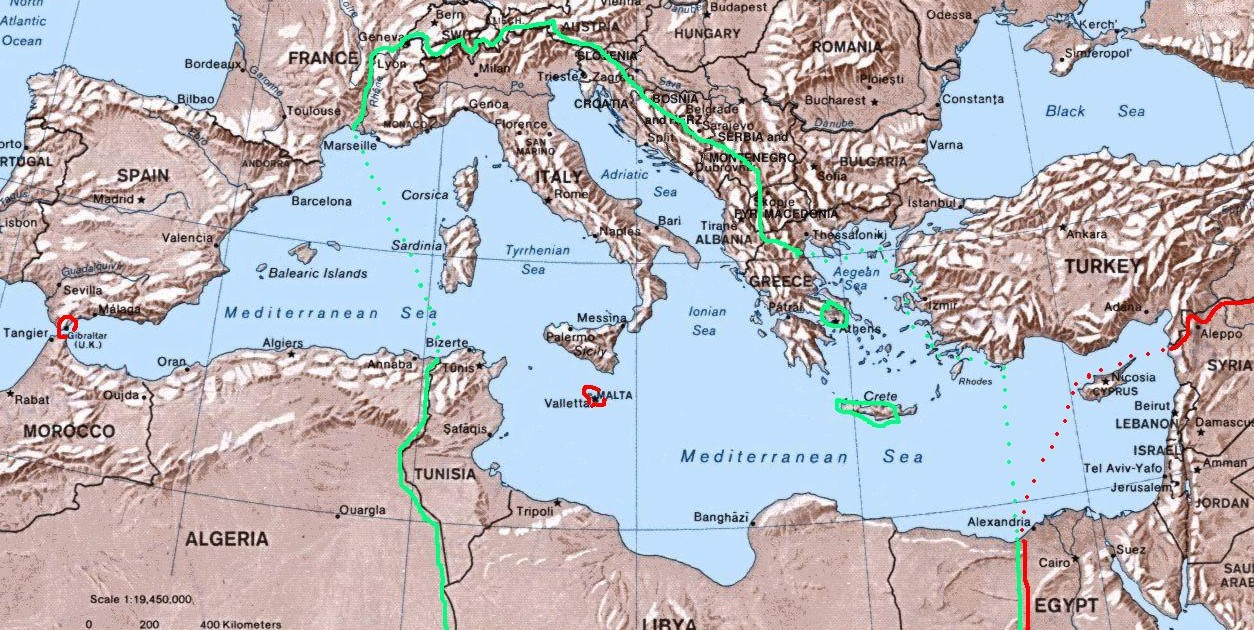
Greatest extent of Italian control of the Mediterranean littoral and seas (within green line and dots) in summer/fall 1942. Allied-controlled areas in red.

The growing naval prowess of the European powers confronted further rapid Ottoman expansion in the region when the Battle of Lepanto checked the power of the Ottoman navy. However, as Braudel argued forcefully, this only slowed the Ottoman expansion instead of ending it. The prized island of Cyprus became Ottoman in 1571. The last resistance in Tunisia ended in 1574 and almost a generation long siege in Crete pushed Venetians out of this strategic island in 1669.

A balance of power was then established between the Spanish Crown and the Ottoman Empire until the 18th century, each dominating their respective half of Mediterranean, reducing Italian navies as naval powers increasingly more irrelevant. Furthermore, the Ottoman Empire had succeeded in their objective of extending Muslim rule across the North African coast.

The development of long-range seafaring had an influence upon the entire Mediterranean. While once all trade from the east had passed through the region, the circumnavigation of Africa allowed gold, spices, and dyes to be imported directly to the Atlantic ports of western Europe. The Americas were also a source of extreme wealth to the western powers, from which some of the Mediterranean states were largely cut off.

The base of European power thus shifted northward and the once wealthy Italy became a peripheral area dominated by foreigners. The Ottoman Empire also began a slow decline that saw its North African possessions gain de facto independence and its European holdings gradually reduced by the territorial gains of Austria and the Russian Empire. In the wake of the aftermath of the 1768–1774 Russo-Turkish War, the Russian empire gained direct access to the Black Sea.

By the nineteenth century the European States were vastly more powerful, and began to colonize North Africa. France spread its power south by starting their conquest of the Regency of Algiers in 1830 and later gaining control over the Beylik of Tunis. Following the British capture of Gibraltar (1713), Malta (1814) and Cyprus (1878), the British Empire occupied Egypt as a result of the 1882 Anglo-Egyptian War. The Suez Canal was opened during this period, with far-reaching consequences for trade between Asia, East Africa and Europe. The Mediterranean countries were preferred because of the shorter route, and port cities such as Trieste with their direct, fast access to Central and Northern Europe were booming. Italy conquered Libya from the Ottomans in 1911. Greece achieved independence in 1832. The Ottoman Empire finally collapsed in the First World War, and its holdings were carved up among France and Britain. The rump state of the wider Ottoman Empire became the independent state of Turkey in 1923. Yugoslavia was created from the former Austro-Hungarian empire at the end of the First World War.

During the first half of the twentieth century the Mediterranean was at the center of the expansion of the Kingdom of Italy, and was one of the main areas of battle during World War II between the Axis and the Allies. Post-world war period was marked by increasing activity in the Eastern Mediterranean, where naval actions formed part of ongoing Arab–Israeli conflict and Turkey had occupied the northern part of Cyprus. Cold War tensions split the Mediterranean into pro-American and pro-Soviet factions, with Turkey, Greece, Spain, Italy and France being NATO members. Syria was socialist and a pro-Soviet regime, offering the Soviets a port for their navy from an agreement in 1971. Yugoslavia was Communist but in neither the Soviet nor American camps. Egypt tilted towards the Soviets during the time of Nasser but then turned towards American influence during the time of Sadat. Israel and Egypt both received massive American military aid. American naval power made the Mediterranean a base for the United States Sixth Fleet during the Cold war.

Today, the Mediterranean Sea is the southern border of the European Union and represents one of the largest area by Trade in the World. The Maltese prime minister described the Mediterranean sea as a "cemetery" due to the large amounts of migrants who drown there. Following the 2013 Lampedusa migrant shipwreck, the Italian government, has decided to strengthen the national system for the patrolling of the Mediterranean Sea by authorizing Operation Mare Nostrum, a military and humanitarian operation in order to rescue the migrants and arrest the traffickers of immigrants.

== See also ==
- Mediterranean Basin
- Life zones of the Mediterranean region
- Museum of European and Mediterranean Civilisations
- Alexandria Mediterranean Countries Film Festival
- Eastern Mediterranean
- Union for the Mediterranean
- History of Anatolia
- History of Europe
- History of the Middle East
- History of North Africa
- History of the Levant
- History of Western civilization

== Bibliography ==
- Banaji, Jairus (2007). "Islam, the Mediterranean and the Rise of Capitalism" (PDF). Historical Materialism. 15. Leiden: Koninklijke Brill: 47–74. doi:10.1163/156920607X171591. ISSN 1465-4466. Archived from the original (PDF) on 2018-03-29.
- López, María Dolores (1996–1997). "De nuevo sobre la "guerra del Estrecho" la contribución financiera del reino de Valencia en la última fase del conflicto (1332–1344)" (PDF). Anales de la Universidad de Alicante. Historia medieval (11). Alicante: University of Alicante: 405–416. ISSN 0212-2480.
- Sola, Emilio (2006). "The Mediterranean, dynamic centre of the 14th century". In María Jesús Viguera Molins (Coord.) (ed.). Ibn Khaldun: The Mediterranean in the 14th Century: Rise and Fall of Empires. Foundation José Manuel Lara. pp. 40–49. ISBN 84-96556-34-4.
