= Torra di Miomu =

Genoese coastal defence tower in Corsica

Tower of Miomu
- Torra di Miomu (Corsican)
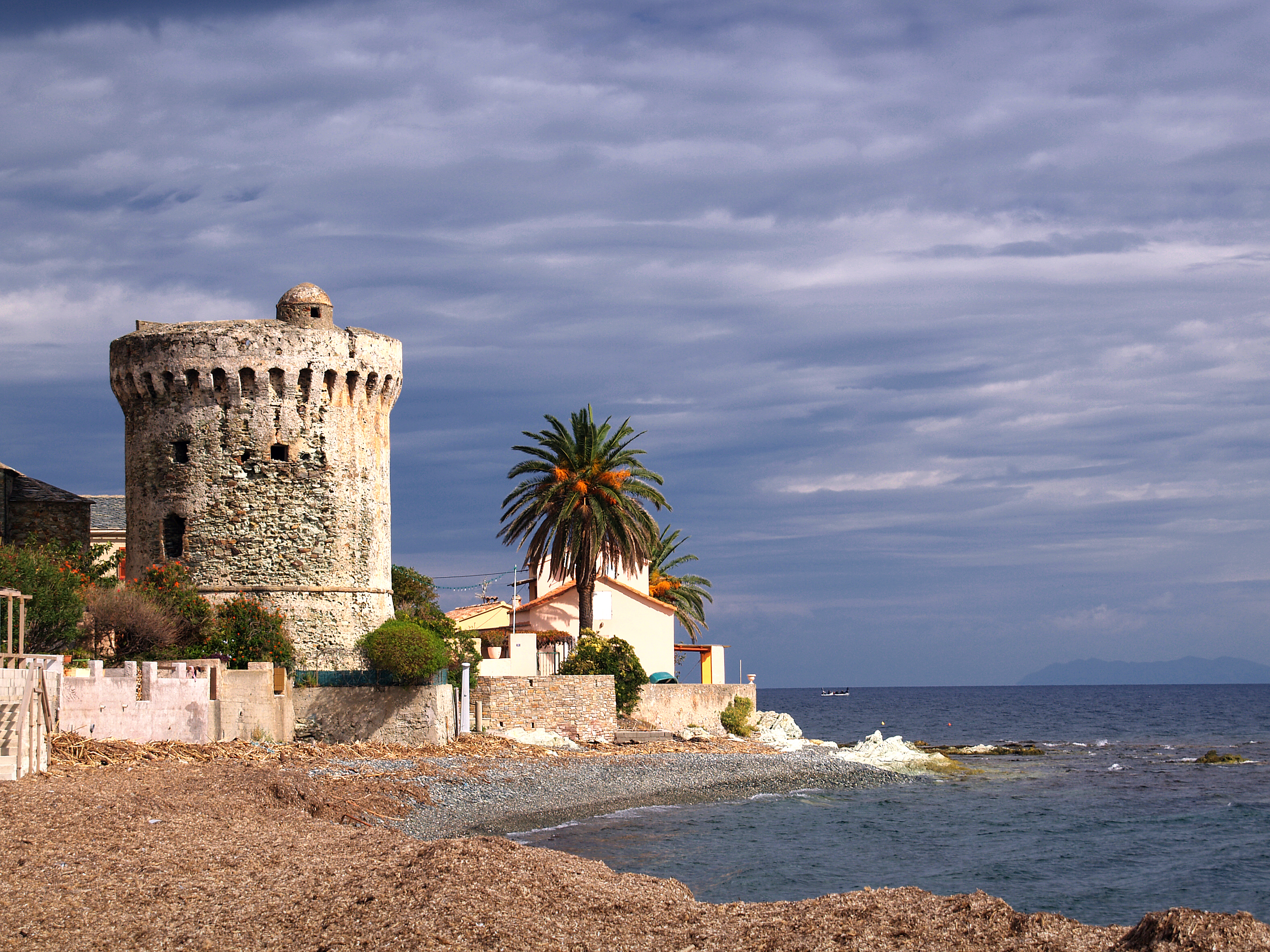

- Location within Corsica
- 42°44′29″N 9°27′42″E

History
- Built: 1561

Monument historique
- Designated: 14 February 1927
- Reference no.: PA00099244

The Tower of Miomu (Corsican: Torra di Miomu) is a Genoese tower located in the commune of Santa-Maria-di-Lota (Haute-Corse) on the east coast of the Corsica. The tower sits on the shore about 6 km north of the port of Bastia.

The tower was built in 1561. It was one of a series of coastal defences built by the Republic of Genoa between 1530 and 1620 to stem the attacks by Barbary pirates. It guarded the Poggiolo valley on Cap Corse. In 1927 the tower was listed as one of the official historical monuments of France.

== See also ==
- List of Genoese towers in Corsica
