= Poggiolo (stream) =

Stream in the department of Haute-Corse, Corsica

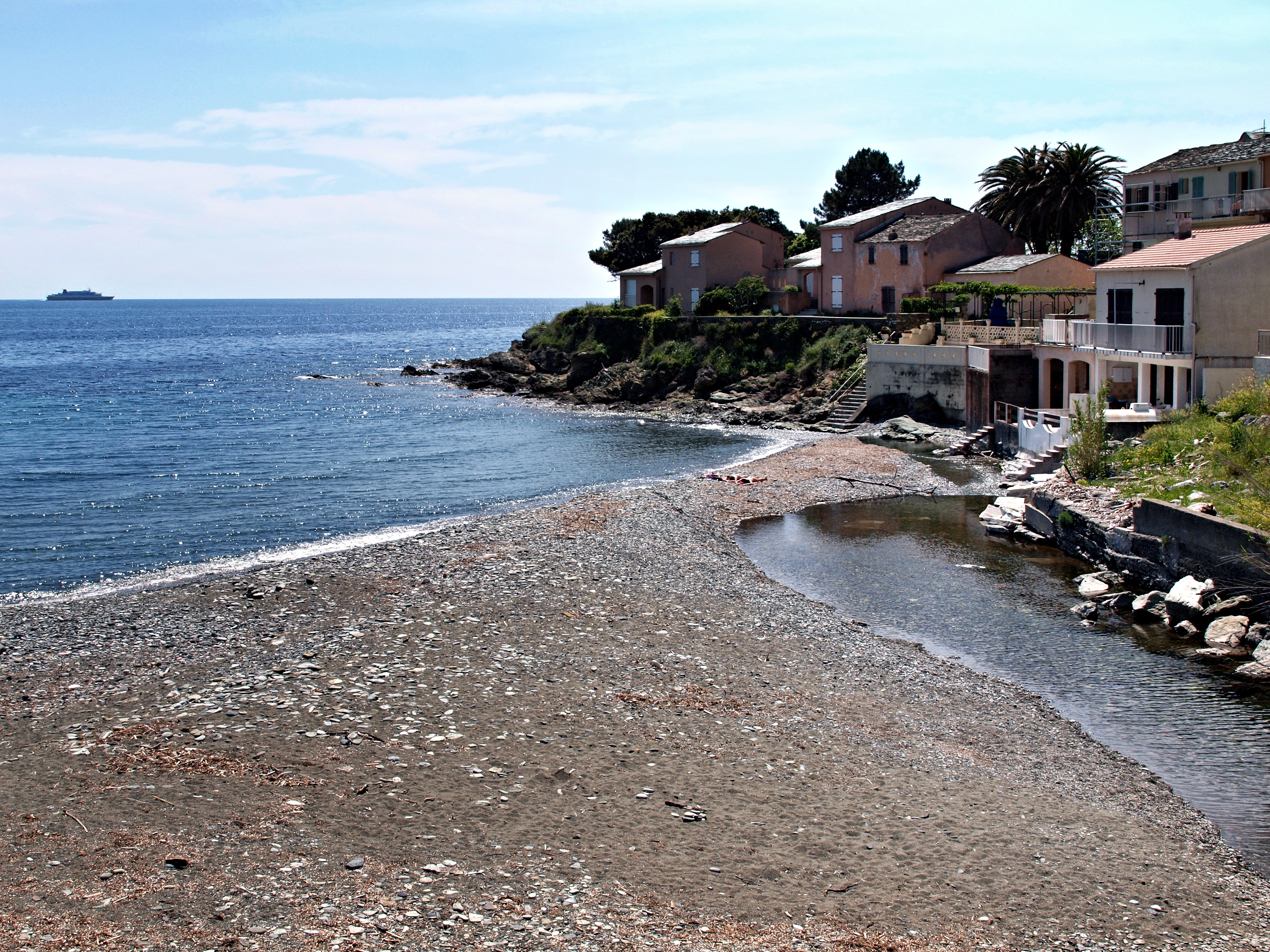
- Mouth of the Poggiolo

- Location within Corsica Location within France

Location
- Country: France
- Region: Corsica
- Department: Haute-Corse

Physical characteristics
- Mouth: Tyrrhenian Sea
  - coordinates: 42.7402°N 9.4613°E

The Poggiolo (French: Ruisseau de Poggiolo, Corsican: Fiume di Poggiolu) is a small coastal stream in the department of Haute-Corse, Corsica, France. It enters the Tyrrhenian Sea from the east of the Cap Corse peninsula.

== Course ==
The Poggiolo is 6.94 kilometres (4.31 mi) long and flows through the communes of San-Martino-di-Lota and Santa-Maria-di-Lota. The stream rises in the Serra di Guagalone. Its source is to the east of the 1,198 metres (3,930 ft) U Cimone. It flows south and then east past the village of Santa-Maria-di-Lota to enter the sea in the village of Miomo. Its mouth is south of the Miomo pebble beach.

For thirteen centuries the coasts of Corsica were at risk of being raided. The Genoese built a tower, the Torra di Miomu, near the mouth of the Poggiolu to guard its valley.

== Environment ==
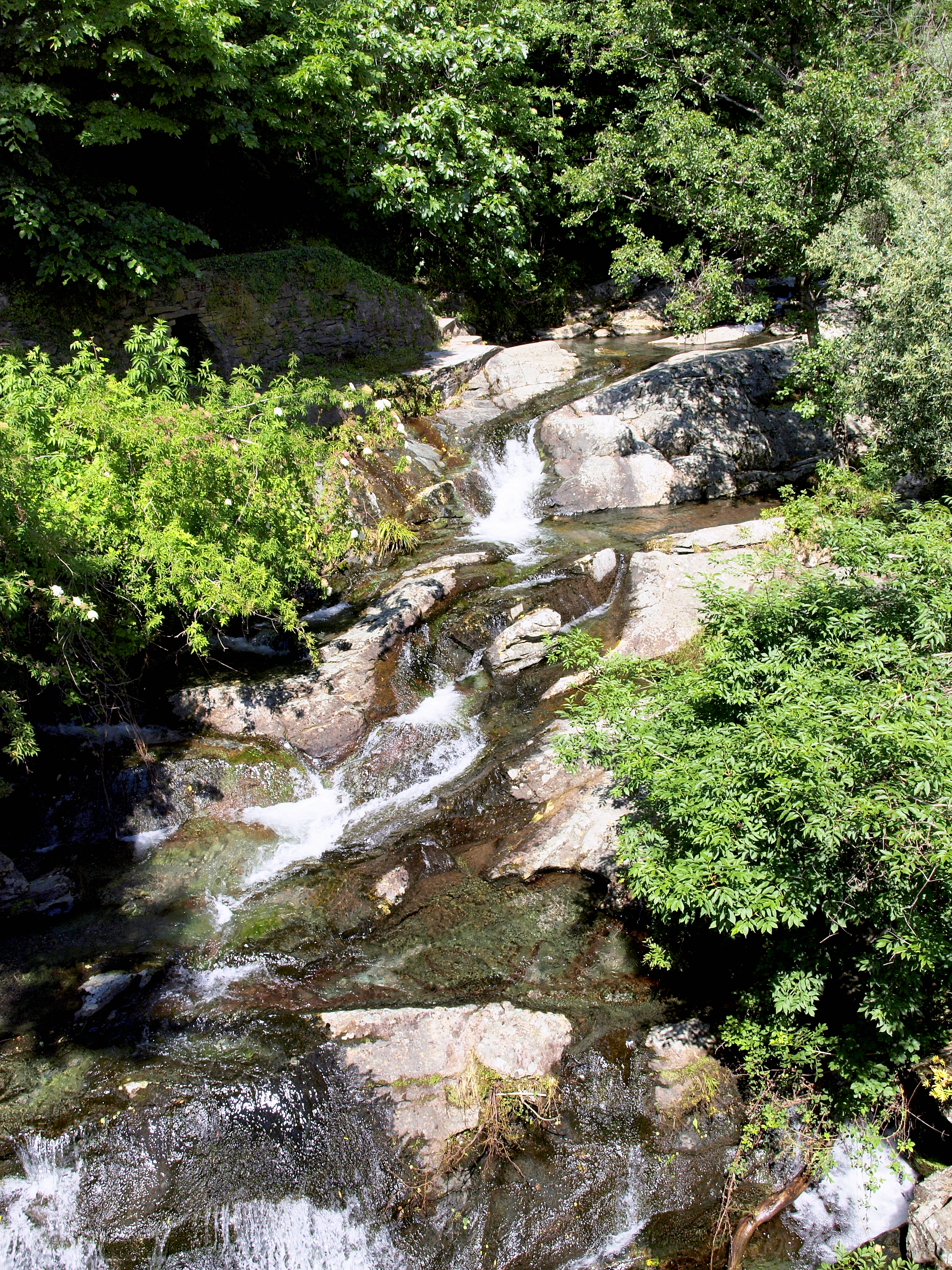
Mandriale tributary

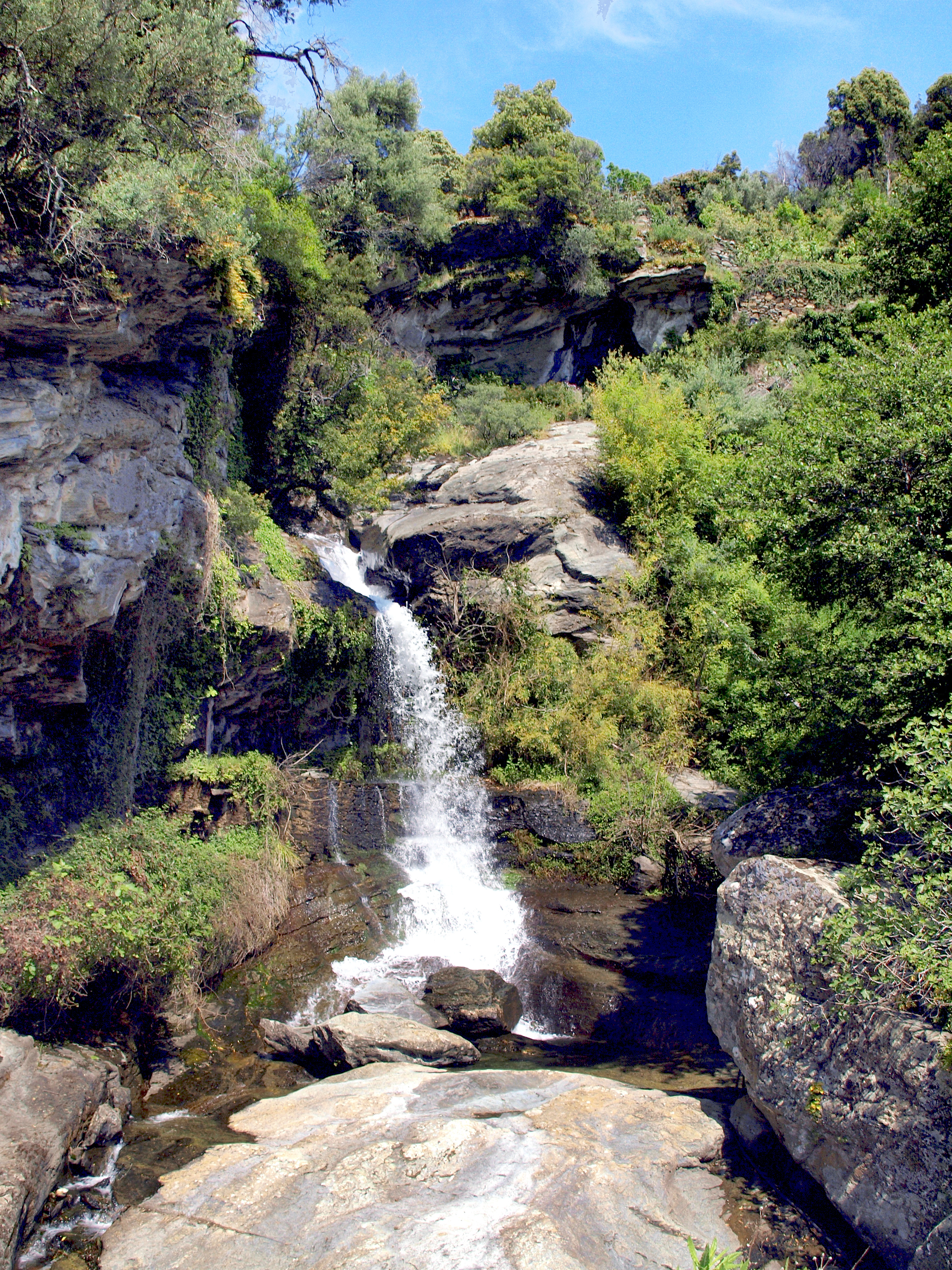
Poggiolo above the D31 bridge

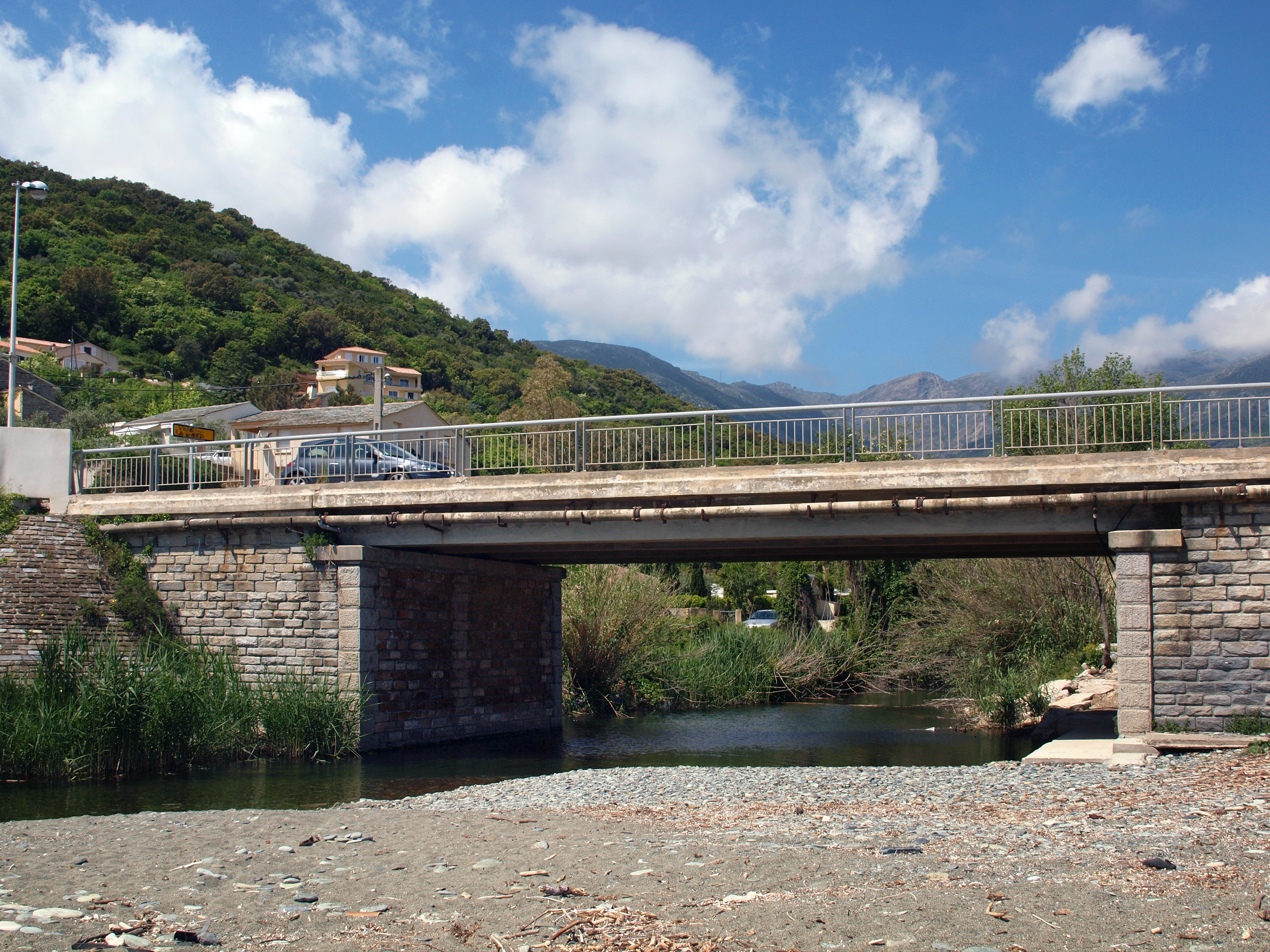
D80 bridge near the stream's mouth

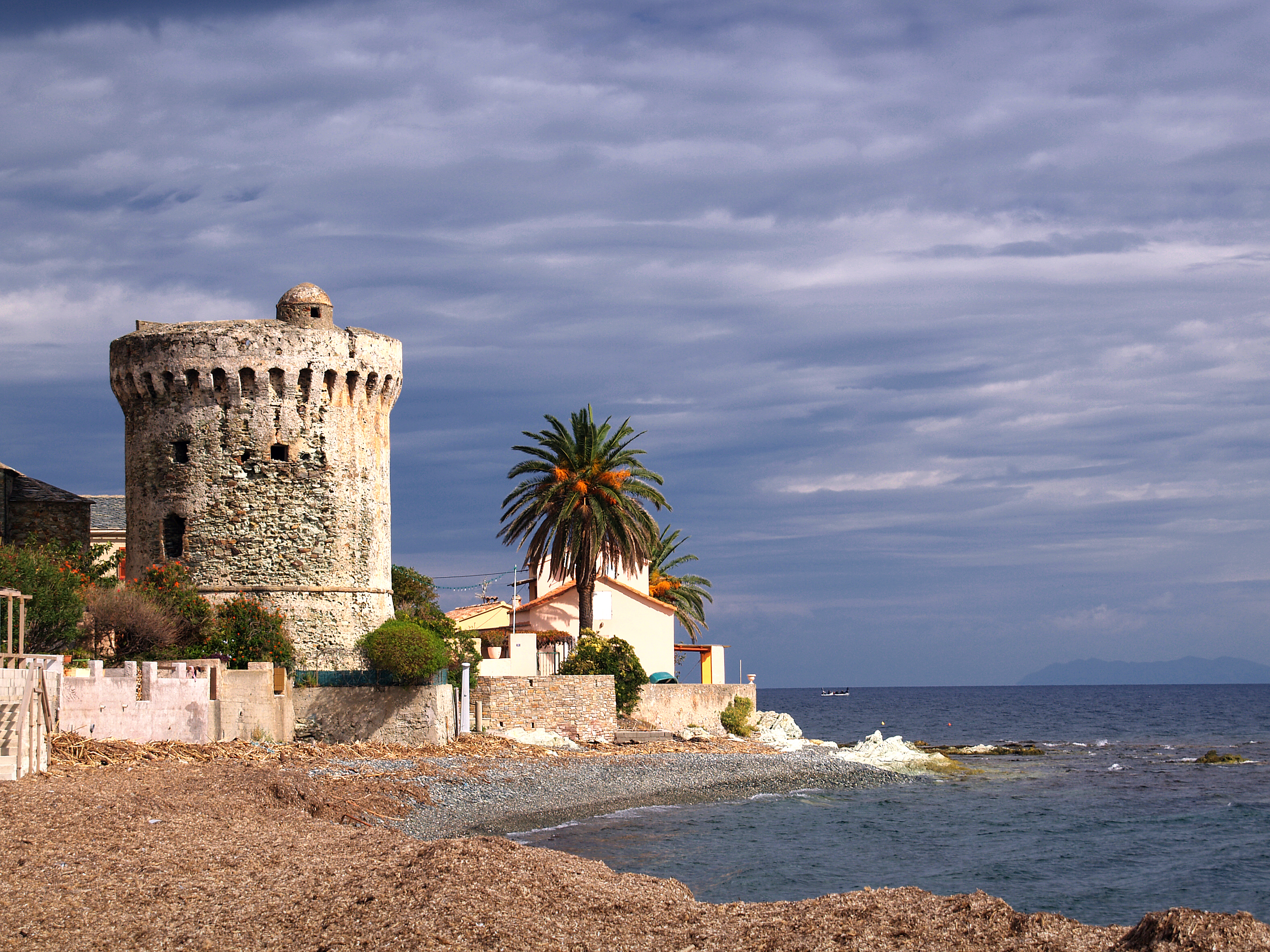
Genoese Tour de Miomo north of the stream's mouth

The stream flows through a hilly schist landscape covered in thick maquis shrubland, with groves of green oaks (Quercus ilex). Along its banks there are ash trees, alders, hornbeams, hops and chestnut trees. The stream is populated with brown trout (Salmo trutta). The stream is in the Chenaies vertes du Cap Corse (Cap Corse green oaks) Zone naturelle d'intérêt écologique, faunistique et floristique (ZNIEFF).

== Tributaries ==
The following streams (ruisseaux) are tributaries of the Poggiolo:

- Mandriale: 3 km (1.9 mi)
- Cavalligna: 3 km (1.9 mi)

== Sources ==
- "Annexe 2-2" (PDF), Inventaire national du patrimoine naturel (INPN) (in French), MNHN & OFB
- Arrête n°2B-2020-11-12-005 (PDF) (in French), Préfet de la Haute-Corse, 12 November 2020
- Notre commune (in French), Commune de San-Martino-di-Lota
- "Relation: Ruisseau de Poggiolo (9423066)", OpenStreetMap
- "Ruisseau de Poggiolo", Sandre
- "San-Martino-di-Lota", Sites à visiter (in French)
- "ZNIEFF 940004078 Chenaies vertes du Cap Corse", Inventaire national du patrimoine naturel (INPN) (in French), MNHN & OFB
