= Monte Poggiolo =

Historical and archaeological site in Italy

Coordinates: 44°12′06″N 11°57′00″E

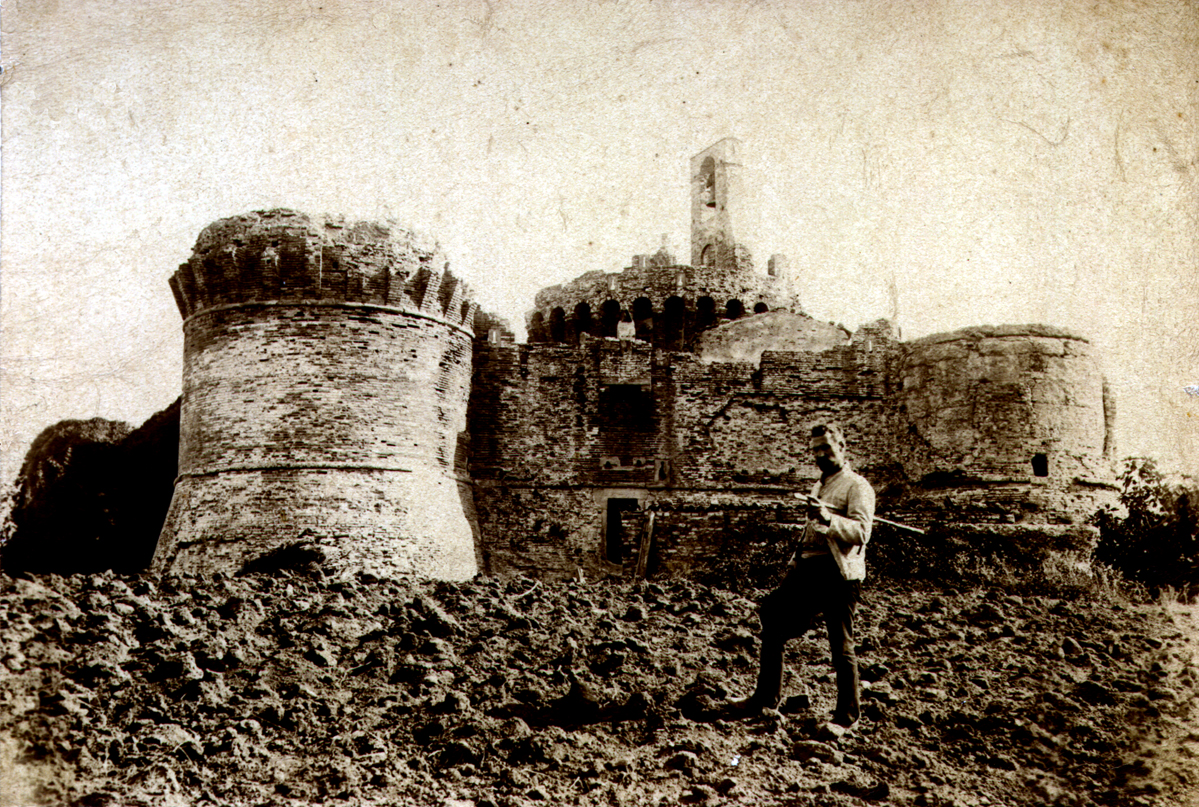
View of the Castle of Monte Poggiolo from 1905.

Monte Poggiolo is a hill near Forlì, Italy in the Emilia-Romagna area that is the site of a Florentine castle. The hill overlooks the Montone River valley from an elevation of 212 metres (696 ft). An archaeological site containing Paleolithic artifacts is situated nearby.

== Florentine castle ==
The hill's Florentine fort was designed by Giuliano da Maiano and built in 1471. Its plan is rhombic, and it features four towers.

== Paleolithic site ==
Thousands of Paleolithic-era artifacts have been recovered from the nearby area of Ca’ Belvedere (for Casa Belvedere) and dated to around 850,000 years before the present, making them the oldest evidence of human habitation in Italy.

== External sources ==
- Ca' Belvedere di Monte Poggiolo (Castle Belvedere of Mount Poggiolo)– English
- Castle pictures – Italian text
