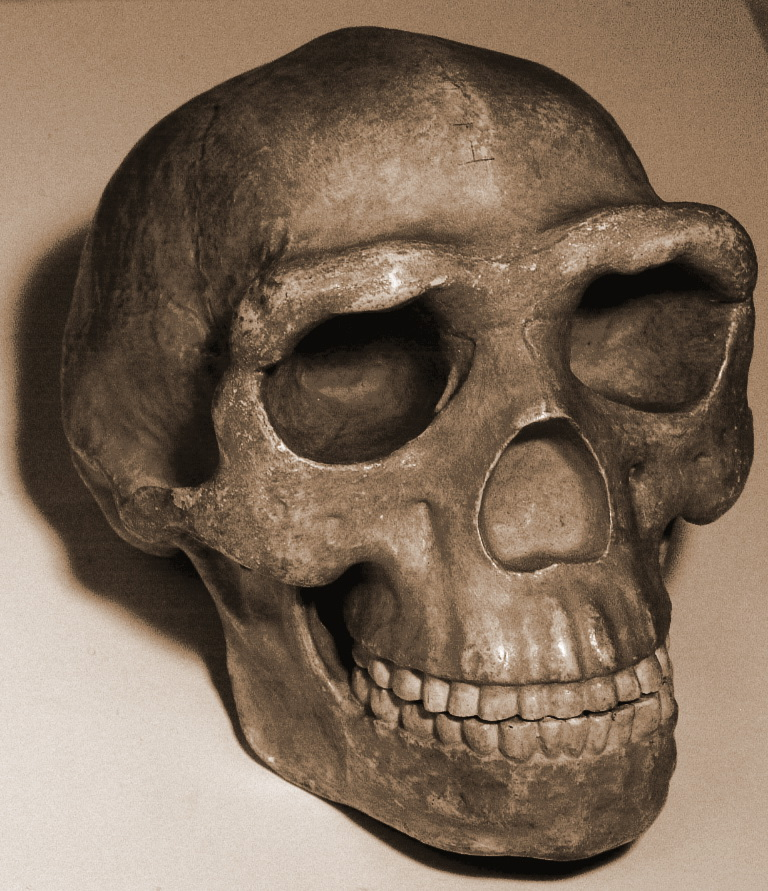
- Traditional reconstruction of a Peking Man skull

Scientific classification
- Kingdom: Animalia
- Phylum: Chordata
- Class: Mammalia
- Order: Primates
- Superfamily: Hominoidea
- Family: Hominidae
- Genus: Homo
- Species: †H. erectus
- Subspecies: †H. e. pekinensis

Trinomial name
- †Homo erectus pekinensis (Black & Zdansky, 1927)

Synonyms
- Sinanthropus pekinensis Black, 1927

= Peking Man =

Peking Man Temporal range: 0.8–0.25 Ma Middle Pleistocene

Historically significant population of Homo erectus near Beijing

Peking Man (Homo erectus pekinensis, originally "Sinanthropus pekinensis") is a subspecies of H. erectus which inhabited what is now northern China during the Middle Pleistocene. Its fossils have been found in a cave some 50 km (31 mi) southwest of Beijing (referred to in the West as Peking upon its first discovery), known as the Zhoukoudian Peking Man Site. The first fossil, a tooth, was discovered in 1921, and Zhoukoudian has since become the most productive H. erectus site in the world. Peking Man was instrumental in the foundation of Chinese anthropology, and fostered an important dialogue between Western and Eastern science. Peking Man became the centre of anthropological discussion, and was classified as a direct human ancestor, propping up the Out of Asia theory that humans evolved in Asia.

Peking Man also played a vital role in the restructuring of Chinese identity following the Chinese Communist Revolution, and it was used to introduce the general populace to Marxism and science. Early models of Peking Man society were compared to communist or nationalist ideals, leading to discussions on primitive communism and polygenism (that Peking Man was the direct ancestor of Chinese people). This produced a strong schism between Western and Eastern interpretations of the origin of modern humans, especially as the West adopted the Out of Africa theory in the late 20th century, which described Peking Man as an offshoot in human evolution. Though Out of Africa is now the consensus, Peking Man interbreeding with human ancestors is still discussed.

Peking Man characterises the classic H. erectus anatomy. The skull is long and heavily fortified, featuring an inflated bar of bone circumscribing the crown, crossing along the brow ridge, over the ears, and connecting at the back of the skull; as well as a sagittal keel running across the midline. The bone of the skull and the long bones is extremely thickened. The face is protrusive (midfacial prognathism), the eye sockets are wide, the jaws are robust and chinless, the teeth are large, and the incisors are shovel-shaped. Brain volume ranged from 850 to 1,225 cc (52 to 75 cu in), for an average of just over 1,000 cc (61 cu in)—within the range of variation for modern humans. The limbs are broadly anatomically comparable to those of modern humans. H. erectus in such northerly latitudes may have averaged roughly 150 cm (4 ft 11 in) in height, compared to 160 cm (5 ft 3 in) for more tropical populations.

Peking Man lived in a cool, predominantly steppe, partially forested environment, alongside deer, rhinos, elephants, bison, buffalo, bears, wolves, big cats, and other animals. Peking Man fossils appear intermittently in Zhoukoudian deposits dating as far back as 800,000 years ago to as recently as 230,000 years ago, but the precise chronology is unclear. This spans several cold glacial and warm interglacial periods. The cultural complexity of Peking Man is fiercely debated. If Peking Man was capable of hunting (as opposed to predominantly scavenging), making clothes, and controlling fire, the population would have been well-equipped to survive frigid glacial periods. If not, the population would have had to retreat southward and return later. It is further disputed if Peking Man inhabited the cave, or was killed by giant hyenas (Pachycrocuta) and dumped there. Over 100,000 pieces of stone tools have been recovered from Zhoukoudian. Those pieces have been mainly debitage (wastage), but also include many simple choppers and flakes, and a few retouched tools such as scrapers and possibly burins.

== Taxonomy ==
=== Research history ===
==== Discovery ====
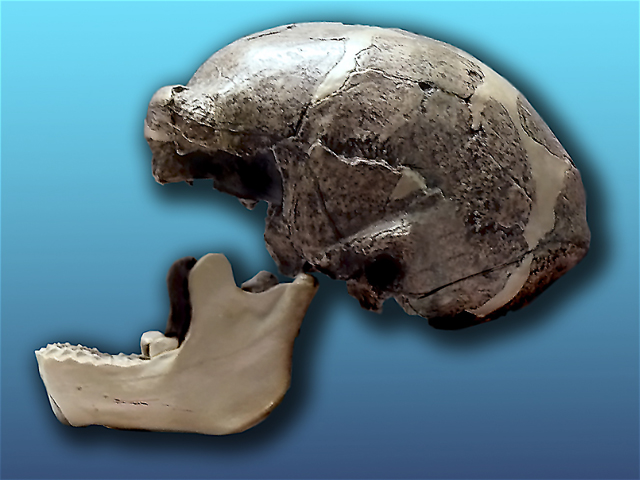
Reconstruction of Skull XI with a hypothetical jawbone

To aid the China Geological Survey's efforts to map out economically relevant deposits, the Geological Survey of Sweden sent the Swedish economic geologist Johan Gunnar Andersson to China in 1914. Andersson soon also began collecting archaeological finds and "dragon bones", as well as documenting Chinese mythology. In 1918, while in Beijing (then referred to in the West as Peking), he was pointed towards a potentially interesting fossil deposit in the mining town of Zhoukoudian in the Fangshan District, about 50 kilometres (31 miles) southwest, by the American chemistry teacher John McGregor Gibb. When Andersson visited a month later, he was directed towards an old limestone quarry which the locals called Chi Ku Shan ('Chicken Bone Hill'). They believed the many rodent fossils found there belonged to chickens stolen by a malevolent group of foxes that had turned into evil trickster spirits and driven a man insane.

Andersson left China to work on other projects, but returned in 1921 with the prominent American palaeontologist Walter W. Granger and the Austrian palaeontologist Otto Zdansky, a recent graduate of the Palaeontological Museum of Uppsala University. Andersson decided that the Chi Ku Shan locality would be an excellent training ground for Zdansky before the pair moved on to excavating Hipparion (horse) fossils in Henan. They were advised by a local that more interesting "dragon bones" could be found at a nearby fissure in a limestone cliff, later named Longgushan ('Dragon Bone Hill') locality. That same year, Zdansky found the first fossil (specimen PMU M3550)—a human tooth—in the site, but he did not report it to Andersson. (Note: In a 1978 interview with journalist John Reader, when asked why he did not tell Andersson of the tooth, Zdansky said, "I recognized it at once, but I said nothing. You see hominid material is always in the limelight and I was afraid that if it came out there would be such a stir, and I would be forced to hand over material I had a promise to publish." Zdansky also did not like Andersson or Zhoukoudian, and was eager to leave them both.) While studying the Zhoukoudian material in Uppsala, Zdansky identified another human tooth, and reported his find (which he cautiously labelled as Homo sp.?) to his professor and mentor Carl Wiman, who informed Andersson in 1926.

As part of his world tour, the crown prince of Sweden (and the chairman of the Swedish China Research Committee, Andersson's benefactor) Gustaf VI Adolf visited Beijing on 22 October 1926. At a meeting planned for the prince, Andersson presented lantern slides of Zdansky's fossil teeth. He was able to convince his friend, the Canadian palaeanthropologist Davidson Black (who worked for the Peking Union Medical College, which was funded by the Rockefeller Foundation), the Chinese geologist Weng Wenhao (the head of the China Geological Survey), and the prominent French palaeoanthropologist Pierre Teilhard de Chardin to jointly take over study of Zhoukoudian. (Note: Black had actually accepted a teaching position at the college because he believed he might find human fossils in the area. In 1921, he helped Andersson analyse Neolithic skeletons excavated from Shaguotun Cave, much to the fierce disapproval of the college's president, Henry S. Houghton. This meeting assured Black's continued involvement in Chinese palaeoanthropology.) Andersson returned to Sweden to become the founding director of the Museum of Far Eastern Antiquities, Stockholm. In the press coverage immediately after the meeting, the German-American geologist Amadeus William Grabau for the first time publicly used the phrase "Peking Man" to refer to Zdansky's fossil teeth.

In 1927, Black was preoccupied with his duties to the college, so Andersson and Wiman sent one of Wiman's students, Anders Birger Bohlin, to oversee excavation beginning on 16 April. On 16 October, Bohlin extracted another fossil human tooth (specimen K11337), which Black made the holotype of a new genus and species called Sinanthropus pekinensis a few weeks later, accrediting the authority to both himself and Zdansky. This was the first anthropologically relevant find for nearly a year, and Teilhard questioned whether Peking Man was actually a human or some animal carnivore. According to the biological anthropologist Noel T. Boaz and the palaeoanthropologist Russell Ciochon, Black's decision to so quickly name a new genus may have been politically motivated—to secure further funding of the site. That year, Weng drafted an agreement with all Zhoukoudian scientists at the time that the Zhoukoudian remains would remain in China. In 1928, the Chinese government similarly clamped down on the exportation of Chinese artefacts and other archaeologically relevant materials to the West for study, viewing it as archaeological looting; foreign scientists were instead encouraged to research these materials within China. In 1929, Black persuaded the Peking Union Medical College, the China Geological Survey, and the Rockefeller Foundation to found and fund the Cenozoic Research Laboratory and ensure further study of Zhoukoudian.

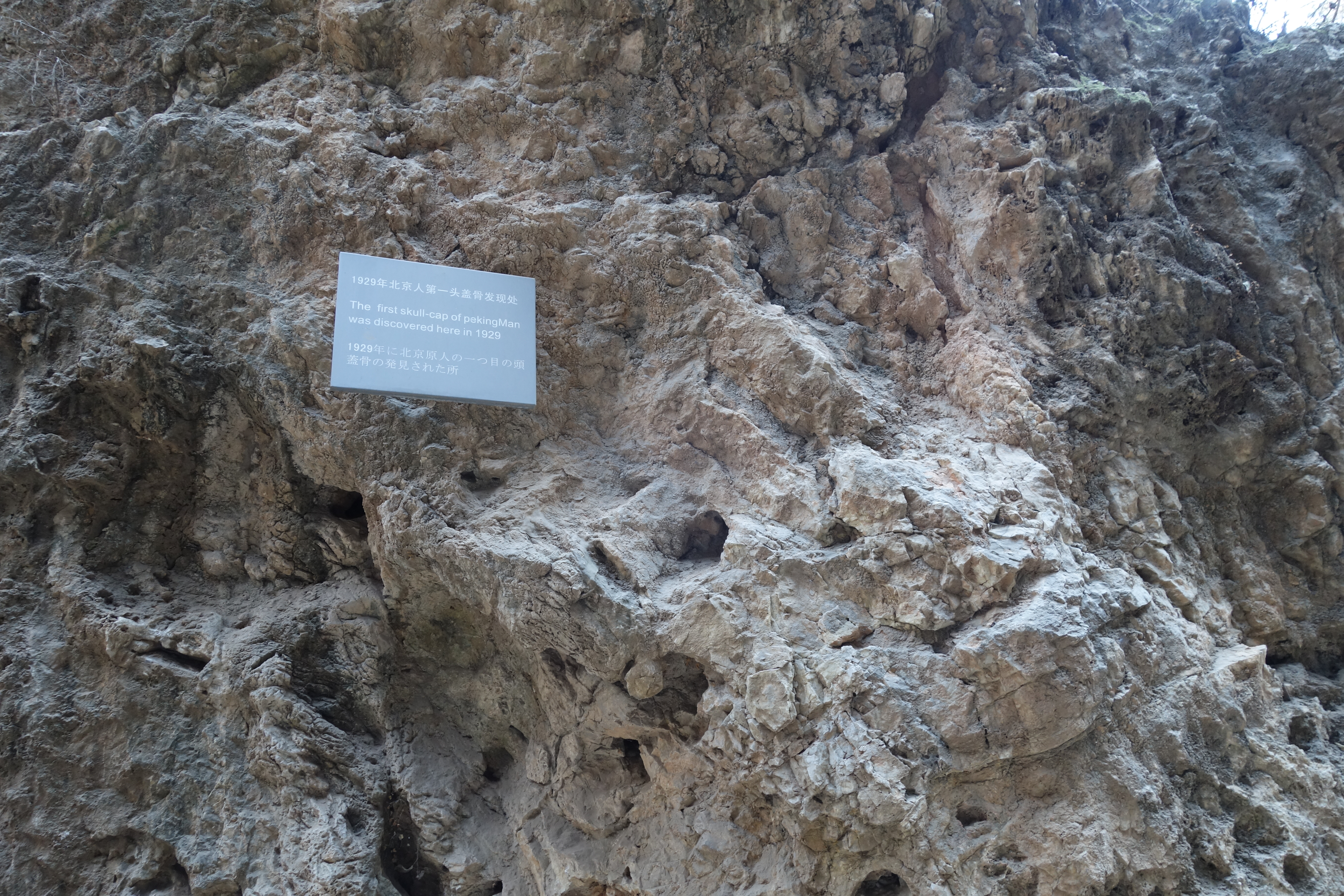
Zhoukoudian Locality 1, where the first relatively complete skullcap was discovered

On 2 December 1929, the Chinese anthropologist Pei Wenzhong discovered a fairly complete skullcap. (Note: The story of Peking Man's discovery has been retold slightly differently several times since. Most versions agree that the skullcap was found at the bottom of the dig pit at 4:00 p.m. on the last field day of the year, December 2, and emphasise that Pei discovered it himself, carrying an almost heroic tone. Chinese palaeoanthropologist Jia Lanpo reported that, based on interviews with one of the site technicians, Wang Cunyi, that four labourers found a round bone; Pei heard the news and went down to investigate, and eventually recognised it as a skullcap as the labourers continued extracting it. Wang could only remember three of their names: Qiao Derui, Song Guorui, and Liu Yishan. In 1982, Pei gave the credit to Liu.) Zhoukoudian proved to be a valuable archaeological site, with a preponderance of human fossils, stone tools, and potential evidence of early fire use, becoming the most productive Homo erectus site in the world. An additional four rather complete skullcaps were discovered by 1936, three of which were unearthed over an 11-day period in November 1936, overseen by the Chinese palaeoanthropologist Jia Lanpo. Excavation employed from 10 to over 100 local labourers depending on the stage, who were paid five or six jiao per day, in contrast to local coal miners who received a pittance of 40 to 50 yuan annually. (Note: A jiao is one-tenth of a yuan.) According to the historian Sigrid Schmalzer, Zhoukoudian employed some of the biggest names in Western and Chinese geology, palaeontology, palaeoanthropology, and archaeology, and facilitated an important discourse and collaboration between these two civilisations. (Note: During the Mao era, the earlier engagement of Western scientists came under much criticism in China. In 1958, Jia asserted the Rockefeller Foundation as well as many prominent American scientists who worked at Zhoukoudian were monopolising science as imperialists. After Deng Xiaoping rose to power in 1978, the diversity Zhoukoudian facilitated was once again celebrated.) After Black's sudden death in 1934 from his congenital heart defect, the Jewish German anatomist Franz Weidenreich, who had fled Nazi Germany, was selected by the Rockefeller Foundation to continue Black's work.

==== Loss of specimens ====
Excavation of Zhoukoudian began to stall after the Marco Polo Bridge incident on 7 July 1937 and the outbreak of the Second Sino-Japanese War. Weidenreich had two crates made to store the Peking Man fossils, and transferred them from the Peking Union Medical College to an American bank vault to safeguard them from Imperial Japanese forces. They were soon returned to the college and stored in a safe in Weidenreich's office, where Weidenreich worked with technicians and artists to make plaster casts and detailed illustrations for his monograph describing the fossils. As the war progressed, Weng and Weidenreich unsuccessfully tried to convince the head of the college, Henry S. Houghton, to authorise a transfer of the Peking Man fossils to the United States for safekeeping. Houghton dismissed Weidenreich in 1941, who took the casts and research notes with him to the American Museum of Natural History in New York City with funding from the Rockefeller Foundation.

By September 1941, Weng and the president of the Rockefeller Foundation Raymond B. Fosdick had persuaded the U.S. embassy to authorise the transfer of the Peking Man fossils. Representing at least 40 different individuals, the fossils were put into two wooden footlockers and were to be transported by the United States Marine Corps from the Peking Union Medical College to the SS President Harrison which was to dock at Qinhuangdao Port (near the Marine base camp Camp Holcomb), and eventually arrive at the American Museum of Natural History. En route to Qinhuangdao, the ship was attacked by Japanese warships and ran aground. Though there have been many attempts to locate the footlockers—including by offers of large cash rewards—it is unknown what happened to them after they left the college on 4 December 1941.

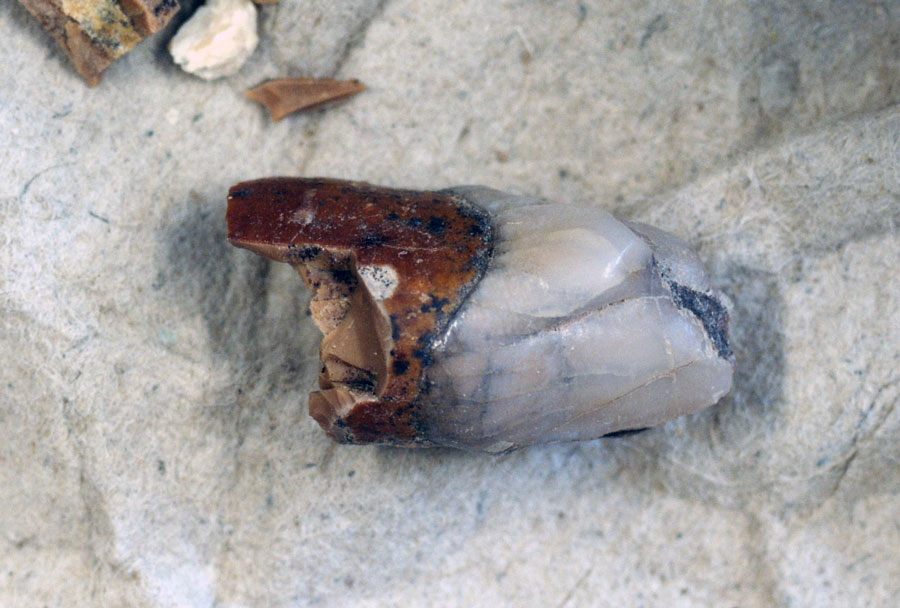
One of the Peking Man teeth at the Palaeontological Museum of Uppsala University

Rumours about the fate of the fossils range from being on board a sunken ship (such as the Japanese Awa Maru) to being ground up for traditional Chinese medicine. The affair also provoked allegations of robbery against Japanese and American groups, especially during the Resist America, Aid Korea Campaign in 1950 and 1951 to promote anti-American sentiment during the Korean War. U.S. Marine corporal Richard Bowen recalled finding a box filled with bones one night in 1947 while digging a foxhole next to some stone barracks in Qinhuangdao. This happened during the Chinese Civil War, during a siege of the city by the Communist Eighth Route Army, who were under fire from Nationalist gunboats. According to Wang Qingpu, the author of a report for the Chinese government on the history of the port, if Bowen's story is accurate, the most probable location of the fossils is 39°55′4″N 119°34′0″E, underneath roads, a warehouse, or a parking lot.

Excavation of the Zhoukoudian was so well documented that the loss of the original specimens did not greatly impact their study. According to Teilhard: "The Sinanthrope has been dated, described, measured, x-rayed, drawn, photographed and cast in plaster down to the last fossa, crista and tubercle .... The loss is more a matter of sentiment than a true tragedy for science." Four of the teeth from the original excavation period are still in the possession of the Palaeontological Museum of Uppsala University.

==== Mao and post-Mao eras ====
Excavation of Zhoukoudian halted from 1941 until the conclusion of the Chinese Civil War in 1949. Field work took place in 1949, 1951, 1958–1960, 1966, and 1978–1981. In 2004, Boaz noted that—given the meticulousness of the dig teams, going so far as to sieve out unidentifiable fragments as small as 1 cm (0.39 in) long—excavation of Zhoukoudian is generally considered to be complete.

Every bone, bone fragment or tooth, however small, is picked up and put aside in a basket which each technician has ready for this purpose. A group of technicians always works together, so that practically each lump of earth will be scrutinized. Nevertheless, the loose earth, too, is afterwards transported to a special place and passed through a fine sieve.

— Franz Weidenreich, 1941

Throughout the Mao era, but especially in 1950 and 1951, Peking Man took on a central role in the restructuring of Chinese identity under the new government, specifically in an attempt to link the ideology of the Chinese Communist Party with human evolution. Peking Man was taught in educational books for all levels, popular science magazines and articles, museums, and at lectures given in workspaces, including factories. This campaign was primarily done to introduce the general populace (including those without advanced education) to Marxism, as well as to overturn widespread superstitions, traditions, and creation myths. (Note: During the Mao era, science and traditional beliefs were commonly viewed as complete opposites. Consequently, popular science dissemination often made an effort to negate ghosts, dragons, and other mythological beings, as well as Christian creationism (but the latter was probably more politically motivated, pressure from the Soviet Union).) Nonetheless, research was constricted as scientists were compelled to fit new discoveries within the frame of Marxism. In 1960, the Cenozoic Research Laboratory was converted into an independent organisation known as the Institute of Vertebrate Paleontology and Paleoanthropology (IVPP), a division of the Chinese Academy of Sciences, to better support excavation of Zhoukoudian. It was headed by Pei, Jia, and the Chinese palaeoanthropologist Yang Zhongjian.

During the Cultural Revolution from 1966 to 1976, all intellectuals, including scientists, came under persecution, and among other things were conscripted into manual labour as part of a campaign to turn "intellectuals into labourers and labourers into intellectuals", which impeded research. Though palaeoanthropology was still able to continue, the field became much less important to the Chinese government with its new resolve to become economically independent, and popular science topics switched from Peking Man and human evolution to production-related matters.

The United Nations declared the Zhoukoudian Peking Man site to be a World Heritage Site in 1987, and custody of the site was handed over from the IVPP to the city of Beijing (which has greater resources) in 2002.

Fossil-bearing Chinese H. erectus sites

The productivity of Zhoukoudian elicited strong palaeoanthropological interest in China, and 14 other H. erectus sites have since been discovered across the country as of 2016 in the Yuanmou, Tiandong, Jianshi, Yunxian, Lantian, Luonan, Yiyuan, Nanzhao, Nanjing, Hexian, and Dongzhi counties.

=== Age and stratigraphy ===
The Zhoukoudian Peking Man Site currently sits 128 m (420 ft) above sea level. The fossil-bearing sediments are divided into 27 localities, and Peking Man is known from Locality 1 (Dragon Bone Hill). This 40 m (130 ft) deep locality is further divided into 17 layers (Layer 1 is the highest and youngest), of which fossils are found above Layer 13, and Peking Man from Layers 10–3. The fossil-bearing regions can also be organised into Loci A–O. Major stone tool accumulations occur in Layers 3 and 4, and the tops of Layers 8 and 10. The animal fossils in the locality suggest it dates to the Middle Pleistocene.

There have been many attempts to more finely tune the date of each layer, starting in the late 1970s. In 1985, the Chinese scientist Zhao Shusen proposed the chronology: 700,000 years ago for Layer 13; 500,000 years ago for Layer 10; and 230,000 years ago for Layers 3. Though these timeframes are generally agreed upon, the exact date of each layer is subject to debate. In 2004, Shen Chengde and colleagues argued that Layer 3 was deposited 400,000 to 500,000 years ago; and Layer 10 between 600,000 and 800,000 years ago, during a mild glacial period.

The earliest H. erectus fossils in all of China, Yuanmou Man, may date to 1.7 million years ago, though stone tools from the Shangchen site in Lantian, central China, could extend the occupation of the region as far back as 2.12 million years ago.

Peking Man specimens, Locality 1

Locus + Individual	Layer	Elements (Note: I_{1} denotes the lower left first incisor, ^{1}I the upper right first incisor, C the canine, P the premolar, and M the molar.)	Sex	Excavation	Age
A1	5	_{2}I, I_{1}, P_{3}, P_{4}, M_{1}, ^{1}M	F	1921–1927, 1952	Juvenile
A2	5	Adult Mandible I, ^{2}M	F	1927–1928	Adult
A3	5	_{1}M, _{3}M	M	1928	Adult
B1	4	Juvenile Mandible I (with teeth)	F	1928, 1935	Juvenile
B2	4	Skull I, Adult Mandible II, Humerus I, Lunate	M	1928, 1935	Adult
B3	4	Juvenile Mandible II	M	1928, 1935	Juvenile
B4	4	Juvenile Mandible III with _{2}M	F	1928, 1935	Juvenile
B5	4	Juvenile Mandible IV	M	1928, 1935	Juvenile
C1	8/9	Juvenile Mandible V with C_{1}, P_{3}, _{4}P, _{2}M	F	1929	Juvenile
C2	8/9	C_{1}, M_{1}	M	1929	Adult
C3	8/9	M_{1}, _{2}I, _{1}M, Femur 1	M	1929, 1938?	Juvenile
C4	8/9	C	F	1929	Adult
D1	10	Skull II with 6 teeth	F	1929	Adult
D2	10	I^{1}, M^{1}, M^{2}, ^{1}I, _{2}M	M	1929	Adult
E1	10	Skull III	M	1929	Juvenile
F1 (Note: Weidenreich was unsure if this specimen represents the same individual as Skull III (E1))	10	Juvenile Mandible VI	M	1930	Juvenile
F2	10	I^{2}, P^{4}, M^{3}, _{2}M	F	1930	Juvenile
F3	10	P^{3}, ^{4}P, ^{3}M	F	1930	Adult
F4	10	I^{1}, ^{2}I, ^{1}C, ^{3}P	M	1930	Juvenile
G1	7	Adult Mandible III	M	1931	Adult
G2	7	Skull IV, Clavicle	M	1931	Juvenile
H1	3	Adult Mandible IV with _{3}P	F	1934	Elderly
H2	3	_{3}P	F	1934	Adult
H3	3	Skull V with ^{3}M	M	1934–1936, 1966	Elderly
H4 (Note: Weidenreich was unsure if this specimen represents the same individual as Skull V (H3))	3	Adult Mandible V	F	1934–1935	Elderly
I1	8/9	Skull VI with 4 teeth, atlas	F	1936	Adult
I2	8/9	Skull VII	M	1936	Juvenile
J1	8/9	Skull VIII	F	1936	Juvenile
J2	8/9	Femur II	F	1936–1938	Adult
J3	8/9	Femur III, Humerus II	M	1936–1938	Adult
J4	8/9	Skull IX	M	1936	Juvenile
K1	8/9	Adult Mandible VI	M	1936	Adult
K2	8/9	_{2}I	F	1936	Juvenile
L1	8/9	Skull X with 8 teeth	M	1936	Adult
L2	8/9	Skull XI with 13 teeth	M	1936	Adult
L3	8/9	Skull XII	M	1936	Adult
L4	8/9	1 upper and 3 lower teeth	M	1936	Juvenile
M1	8/9	Adult Mandible VII, Femur 6	M	1937–1938	Adult
M2	8/9	Adult Mandible VIII	F	1937	Adult
M3	8/9	Femur VII	F	1937–1938	Adult
M4	8/9	Femora IV and V	M	1937–1938	Adult
N1	8/9	P_{4}, M^{1}	F	1937	Juvenile
O1	10	Skull XIII with 6 teeth	M?	1937	Adult
O2	10	M_{1}		1937	Adult
	8/9?	I^{1}, M_{1}, M_{2}		1949	Adult
	8/9?	^{3}P		1951	Adult
	8/9?	Humerus III		1937?, 1951	Adult
	8/9?	Tibia I		1937?, 1951	Adult
	8/9?	^{4}P		1951	Adult
	10	Adult Mandible IX with M_{1}	F	1959	Adult
	3	_{3}P		1966	Adult

=== Classification ===
==== Background ====
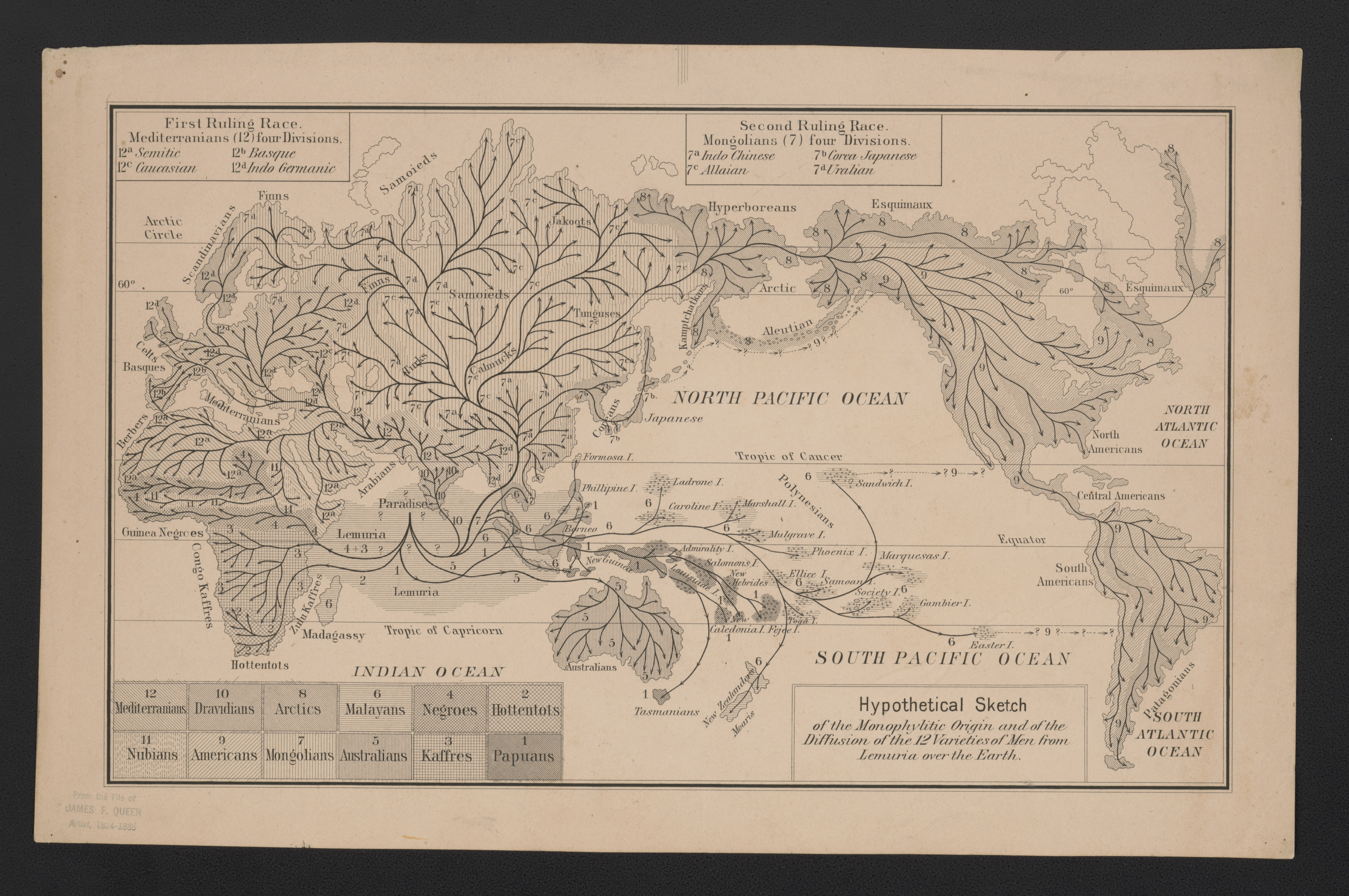
Ernst Haeckel suggested early humans dispersed from the now-disproven hypothetical continent "Lemuria".

While Charles Darwin had hypothesised in his 1871 Descent of Man that humans most likely evolved in Africa, many late-19th century evolutionary naturalists postulated that Asia was the birthplace of humankind, as it is midway between all continents via land routes or short sea crossings, providing optimal dispersal routes throughout the world. Among them was Ernst Haeckel, who argued that the first human species (which he proactively named "Homo primigenius") evolved on the now-disproven hypothetical continent "Lemuria" from a genus he termed "Pithecanthropus" ('ape-man'). "Lemuria" had supposedly sunk below the Indian Ocean, so no fossils could be found to prove this. Nevertheless, Haeckel's model inspired Dutch scientist Eugène Dubois to join the Royal Netherlands East Indies Army and search for the "missing link" in Java. He found a skullcap and a femur (Java Man) which he named "P. erectus" (using Haeckel's hypothetical genus name) and unfruitfully attempted to convince the European scientific community that he had found an upright-walking ape-man; they dismissed his findings as some kind of malformed non-human ape.

In regard to the ancestry of Far Eastern peoples, the French orientalist Albert Terrien de Lacouperie advanced the now discredited theory of Sino-Babylonianism, which placed the origin of Chinese civilisation in the Near East, namely Babylon. Terrien de Lacouperie argued, according to historical race concepts and the idea of social degeneration, that the Chinese peoples had regressed compared to the superior races of Europe. This came under fire by the time Peking Man was discovered, when China was in the midst of the New Culture Movement and surging nationalism subsequent to the 1911 Revolution that ended the Qing dynasty and established the Republic of China. These ideologies not only aimed to remove imperialist influences, but also to replace ancient Chinese traditions and superstitions with western science to modernise the country and lift its standing on the world stage to that of Europe.

==== "Out of Asia" theory ====
Unlike previously discovered extinct human species, notably the Neanderthal and Java Man, the Peking Man was readily accepted into the human family tree. In the West, this was aided by a popularising hypothesis for the origin of humanity in Central Asia, championed primarily by the American palaeontologist Henry Fairfield Osborn and his apprentice William Diller Matthew. They believed that Asia was the "mother of continents", and that the rising of the Himalayas and Tibet and subsequent drying of the region forced human ancestors to become terrestrial and bipedal. They also believed that populations which retreated to the tropics—namely Dubois' Java Man and the "Negroid race"—substantially regressed. This required them to reject Sir Raymond Dart's far more ancient South African Taung child (Australopithecus africanus) as a human ancestor when he described it in 1925, favouring Charles Dawson's 1912 hoax "Piltdown Man" from Britain.

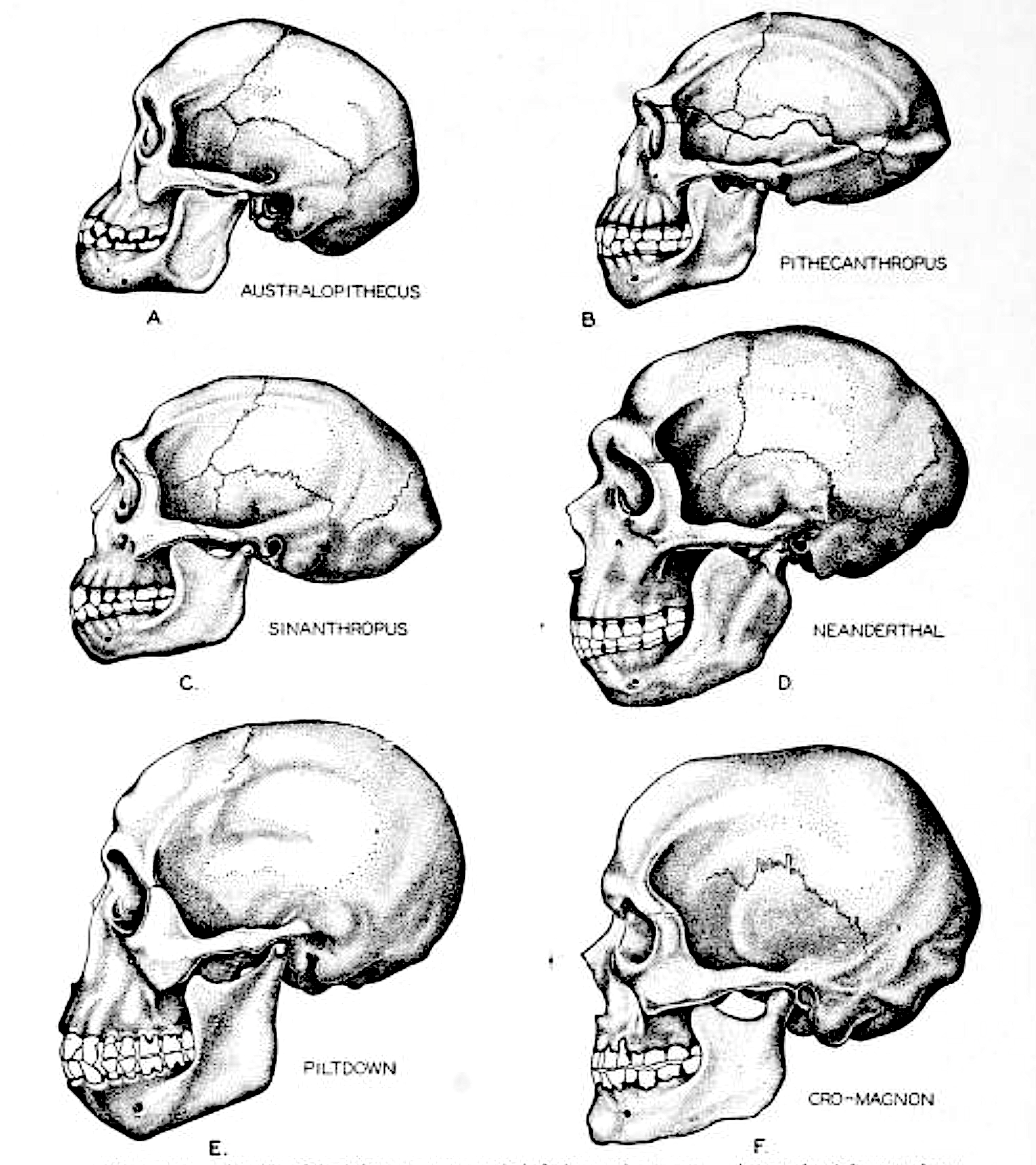
1936 restorations of various fossil skulls (note the "Piltdown Man" was declared a hoax in 1953 and the Peking Man skull was revised in 1937 and again in 1996.)

The Peking Man, with a brain volume much larger than that of living apes, was used to further invalidate African or European origin models. Peking Man's importance in human evolution was championed by Grabau in the 1930s, who (much like Osborn) contended that the lifting of the Himalayas caused the emergence of proto-humans ("Protanthropus") in the Miocene, who then dispersed during the Pliocene into the Tarim Basin in Northwestern China where they learned to control fire and make stone tools. "Protanthropus" then reached Eastern China and evolved into "Sinanthropus"; and from there went out to colonise the rest of the Old World, where it evolved into "Pithecanthropus" in Southeast Asia, "Eoanthropus" (Piltdown Man) in Europe, and Homo (Kanam Mandible) (Note: The Kanam Mandible was discovered by Louis Leakey in Kenya in 1932.) in Africa. Citing degeneration theory, Grabau believed that "Pithecanthropus" and African Homo had regressed to a more primitive state. To explain the paucity of stone tools in Asia compared to Europe (an apparent contradiction if humans had occupied Asia for longer), he also stated that Pleistocene Central Asia was too cold to permit back-migration by early modern humans or Neanderthals (primitive Homo) until the Neolithic. The Central Asia model was the leading consensus of the time.

Peking Man became an important matter of national pride, and was used to extend the antiquity of the Chinese people and the occupation of the region to 500,000 years ago, with discussions of human evolution becoming progressively Sinocentric even in Europe. In the 1930s, Weidenreich began arguing that Peking Man was ancestral to the "Mongoloid race", forwarding his polycentric hypothesis, where local populations of archaic humans evolved into the local modern humans, as opposed to every modern population sharing an anatomically modern ancestor (polygenism). (Note: Weidenreich's theory was not exactly polygenism, and he rejected earlier polygenic theories propagated by German physician Hermann Klaatsch and peers, who suggested the "Negroid race" descended from gorillas, the "Mongoloid race" from orangutans, and the "Caucasian race" from chimpanzees.) Other scientists working on the site made no such claims. The sentiment that all Chinese ethnic groups—including the Han, Tibetans, and Mongols—were indigenous to the area for such a long time became more popular during the Second Sino-Japanese War and the occupation of China by Japan. By the Mao era, Peking Man was ubiquitously heralded as a human ancestor in China.

==== "Sinanthropus" ====
Black classified the Peking Man material in 1927 as a new genus and species—"Sinanthropus pekinensis"—based on only three teeth. Initially, palaeoanthropologists assumed that expansion of the braincase was the first major innovation in human evolution away from apes. Consequently, because he characterised Peking Man as a human ancestor, Black initially believed that Peking Man would be more similar to Piltdown Man (with a big brain and modern skullcap but an apelike jaw) than Java Man (which at the time was characterised as a giant gibbon by Dubois). When the first Peking Man skullcap was discovered in 1929, Black and his mentor Sir Grafton Elliot Smith noted "a curious blend of characters" between Peking Man, Java Man, and Piltdown Man. They were unsure how to resolve these relationships.

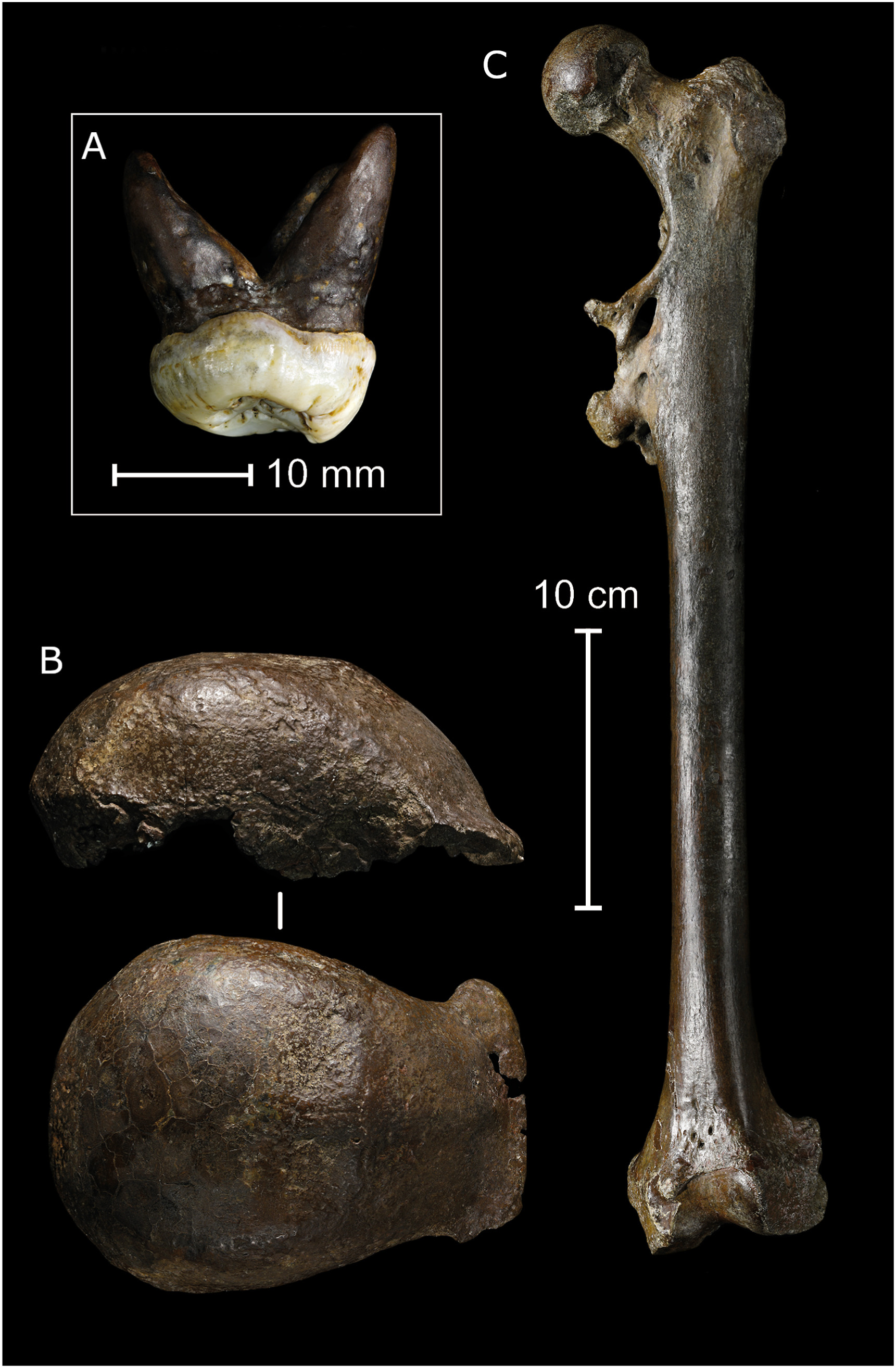
Franz Weidenreich early on recognised the similarity between Java Man (above) and Peking Man.

Weidenreich, on the other hand, dismissed Piltdown Man as a chimera of a modern human skull and an orangutan jaw in 1923, and also argued that Java Man had a humanlike body plan. In 1935, he claimed the differences between Peking Man and Java Man, "can be due at most to racial variation". Following the German-Dutch palaeontologist Gustav Heinrich Ralph von Koenigswald's further Java Man discoveries in Mojokerto and Sangiran, von Koenigswald and Weidenreich declared in a 1939 paper that Java Man and Peking Man are, "related to each other in the same way as two different races of present mankind, which may also display certain variations in the degree of their advancement."

In 1940, Weidenreich likewise suggested that, if Peking Man ("Sinanthropus pekinensis") and Java Man ("Pithecanthropus erectus") are ancestral to different modern human populations (classified into several subspecies of Homo sapiens), then they should be subsumed under Homo as subspecies of the same pre-modern species as H. erectus pekinensis and "H. e. javanensis", respectively. Nonetheless, Weidenreich continued using "Sinanthropus" (and "Pithecanthropus") until his death in 1948 because he saw it "just as a name without any 'generic' or 'specific' meaning, or in other words, as a 'latinization' of Peking Man." In 1945, the British anatomist Wilfrid Le Gros Clark argued that, in accordance with nomenclature codes, the correct name should be "Pithecanthropus pekinensis". Still, especially after the Holocaust, Weidenreich and many of his colleagues desired to reform anthropology away from its fixation on racial distinctness and purity. Weidenreich discussed applying the burgeoning field of genetics to physical anthropology with namely Theodosius Dobzhansky and Sherwood Washburn, as modern evolutionary synthesis was being formulated.

In 1950, the German-American evolutionary biologist Ernst Mayr had entered the field of anthropology, and, surveying a "bewildering diversity of names," decided to subsume human fossils into three species of Homo: "H. transvaalensis" (the australopithecines), H. erectus (including "Sinanthropus", "Pithecanthropus", and various other Asian, African, and European taxa), and H. sapiens (including anything younger than H. erectus, such as modern humans and Neanderthals), as had been broadly recommended by many prior authors. He classified Peking Man as H. e. pekinensis. Mayr defined these species as a sequential lineage, with each species evolving into the next (chronospecies). Though later Mayr changed his opinion on the australopithecines (recognising Australopithecus), his more conservative view of archaic human diversity became widely adopted in the subsequent decades. Thus, Peking Man was considered a human ancestor in both Western and Eastern thought.

==== "Out of Africa" theory ====
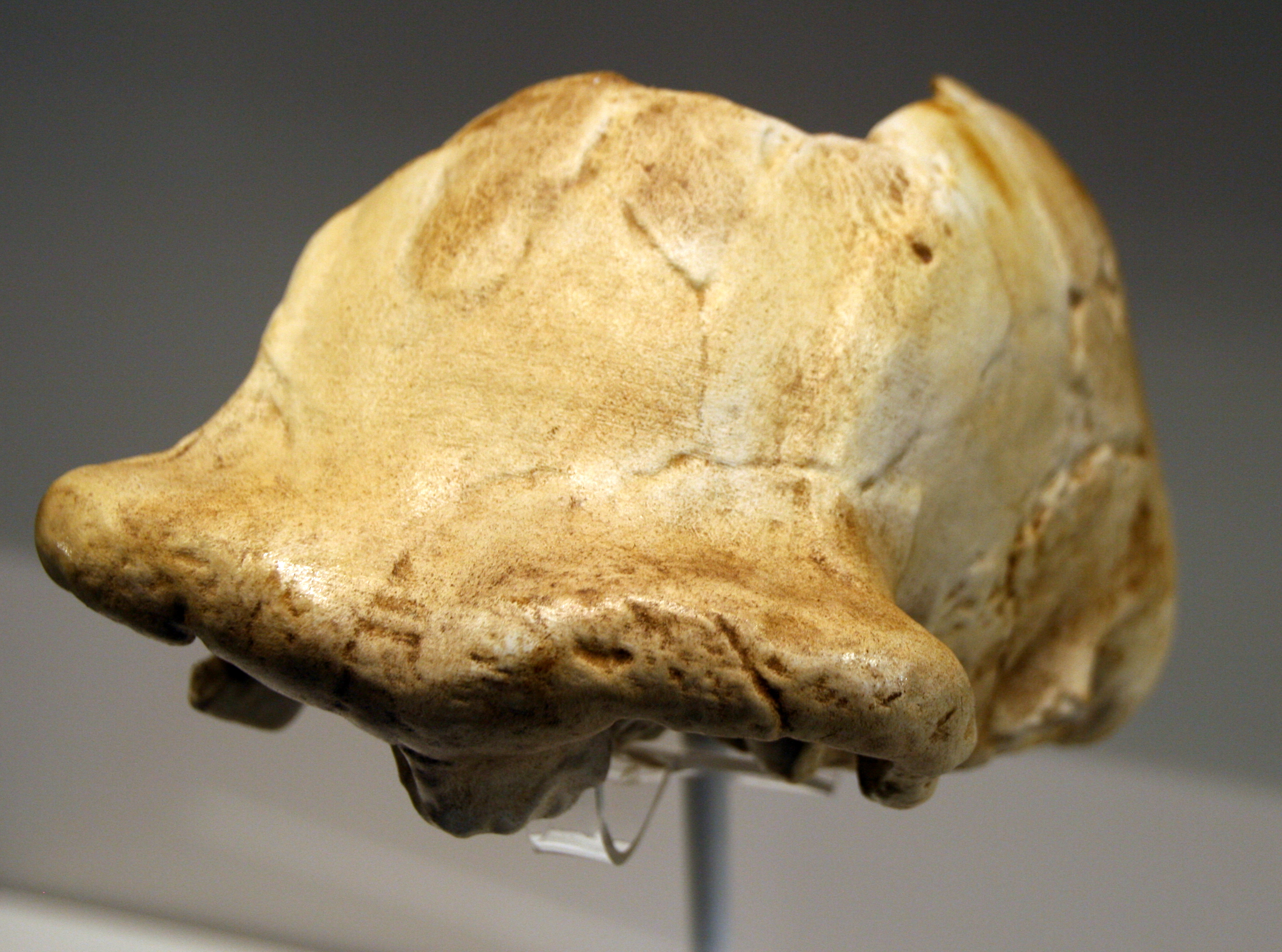
Olduvai Hominin 9 (above) and other African H. erectus discoveries marginalised Peking Man's role in human evolution.

During the Mao era, Western scientists suspected that Chinese publications were distorted by propaganda. During the 1960s and 1970s, the position of the more ancient Australopithecus in human evolution once again became a centre of debate. In China, Wu Rukang argued that the African Australopithecus was the "missing link" between apes and humans, but was met with much derision from Chinese peers. Following the reform and opening up of China with the rise of Deng Xiaoping in 1978, Western works contradictory to tenets of Maoist ideology were circulated throughout China, radically altering Eastern anthropological discussions. In the late 20th century, human evolution had become Afrocentric with the gradual acceptance of Australopithecus as human ancestors, and the consequent marginalisation of Peking Man, especially as older fossils of H. erectus were being unearthed in Africa, first by Kenyan archaeologist Louis Leakey in 1960 with Olduvai Hominin 9. H. erectus is now largely considered to have evolved in Africa and later spread to other continents.

To counter the declining interest of Eastern palaeoanthropology in academia with the rise of Afrocentrism, many Chinese scientists commonly advanced Sinocentric and often polygenic arguments. They posited the antiquity of racial distinctness before the evolution and dispersal of modern humans, as well as the racial continuity between local H. erectus and modern descendent races; for example, they contended that "typically 'Mongoloid' features" such as shovel-shaped incisors (Note: In recent populations, the trait is triggered by the EDAR V370A allele, and seldom occurs outside East Asians and indigenous peoples of Siberia and the Americas. This allele seems to have experienced positive selection in an ancestor population (maybe one from Beringia) about 20,000 years ago during the Last Glacial Maximum (LGM).) carried over from Peking Man to modern Chinese people. They often cited the 2-million-year-old Wushan Man from central China, which is no longer classified as a human, and asserted that several Chinese apes millions of years old were human ancestors. Jia proposed that the earliest human species evolved on the Tibetan Plateau; the adjacent province of Guizhou was another popularly proposed genesis point. Various late Middle Pleistocene Chinese specimens have been argued, such as by the Chinese palaeoanthropologist Wu Xinzhi, to represent hybrid populations between Peking Man and other ancestors of modern humans, such as the Dali Man or the Jinniushan Man. (Note: Some authors have tried splitting off these ambiguous specimens into multiple new species which all would have inhabited Middle Pleistocene China at the same time, such as H. longi and H. juluensis. In general, the classification of Middle Pleistocene fossils has remained a contentious question, termed "the muddle in the middle".) In the 1970s, the travelling museum exhibit "The Exhibition of Archaeological Finds of the People's Republic of China"—organised by the Chinese Communist Party (CCP) to tour around Western Europe, the US, and Canada—painted Peking Man and Lantian Man as the "forefathers of the Chinese people", playing a central role in the story of human evolution, and emphasising the antiquity of the Chinese people. Additionally, at least since the mid-1990s, the CCP has utilised Peking Man as an instrument of its racial nationalist discourse.

Peking Man's ancestral position is still widely maintained, especially among Chinese scientists using the assimilation model, wherein archaic humans such as Peking Man interbred with and were effectively absorbed into modern human populations in their respective locations. According to this model, Peking Man has lent some ancestry to modern Chinese populations. Palaeogenetic analyses—the first in 2010—have reported that all humans whose ancestry lies beyond Sub-Saharan Africa contain genes from the archaic Neanderthals and Denisovans indicating early modern humans interbred with archaic humans. (Note: Subsaharan Africans carry archaic introgression from an unidentified ghost lineage which diverged before Neanderthals and Denisovans split with modern humans.) The common ancestor of Neanderthals and Denisovans in turn interbred with another archaic species even further removed from modern humans. Still, East Asian H. erectus from China and Indonesia are now usually characterised as relict populations which had little interaction with Western H. erectus or later Homo species.

=== Phylogeny ===
Many Chinese H. erectus fossils were given a unique subspecies name based on minute anatomical differences. As the definition of "subspecies" tightened in the late 20th century, it became impossible to justify all of these names. In general, subspecies names for H. erectus are now used for convenience to indicate time and region rather than specific anatomical trends. The name H. e. pekinensis may extend to all Chinese H. erectus but is usually used to refer only to Zhoukoudian.

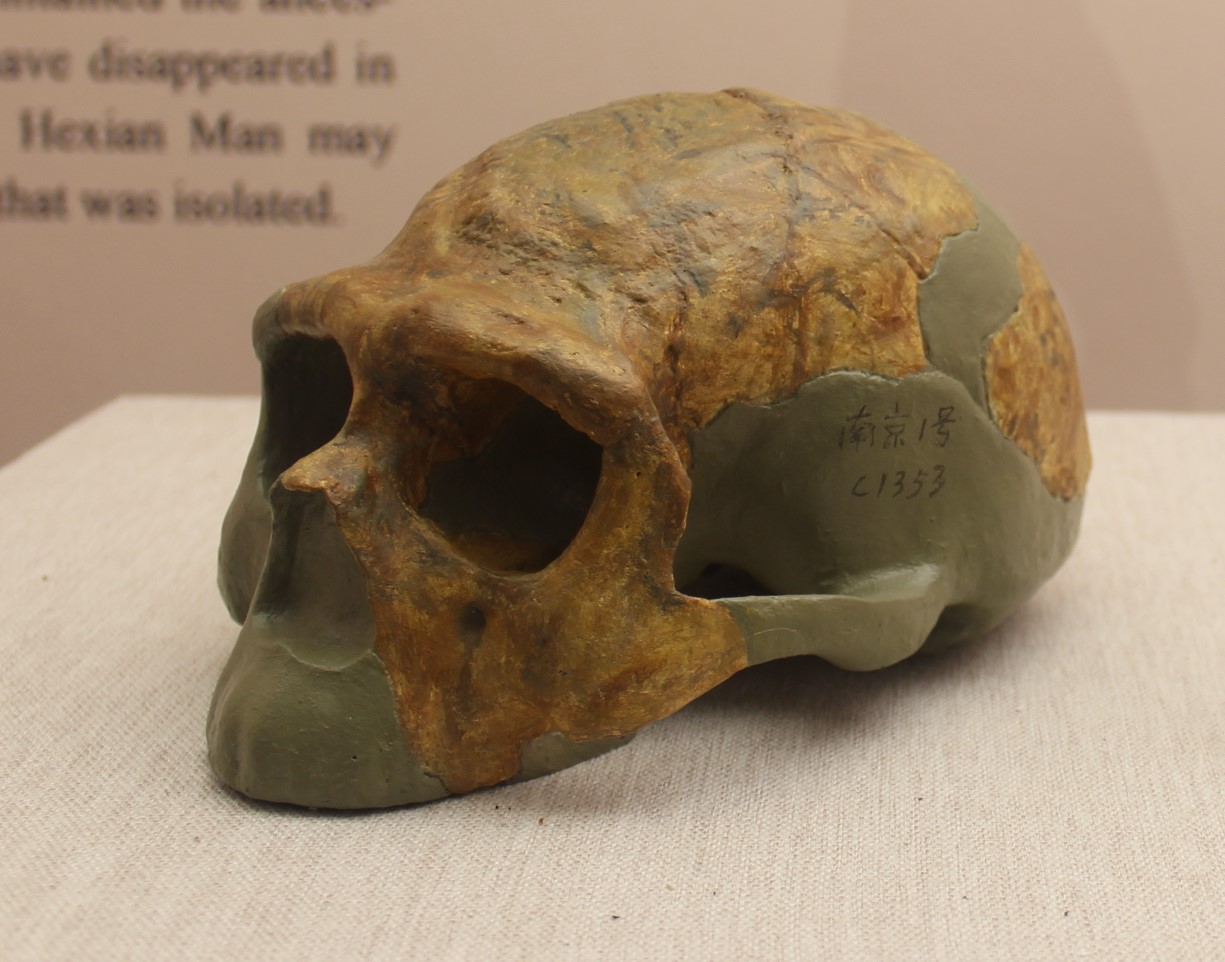
Among other H. erectus, Peking Man is most similar to Nanjing Man (above)

The anatomy of Chinese H. erectus specimens varies regionally and over time, but this variation is subtle and difficult to assess given how fragmentary H. erectus remains are both in and out of China. Northern Chinese specimens (namely Peking Man and Nanjing Man) are distinct in the narrowness of the skull, but H. erectus skull shape is poorly documented elsewhere in China. Some authors have suggested that the anatomical peculiarities of the Zhoukoudian specimens indicate speciation rather than a geographic cline, and consider Peking Man as a separate species, H. pekinensis.

H. erectus may have made multiple different dispersals out of Africa to the Far East, with the population represented by the Indonesian Sangiran site possibly being more closely related to Western H. erectus than to Peking Man. A population related to Peking Man may have later interbred with Southeast Asian H. erectus, since the younger teeth at Sangiran are much smaller than the older ones—more like those of Peking Man's—but tooth reduction could have happened for other reasons.

A 2026 dental proteome (tooth enamel protein) analysis identified a single amino acid polymorphism variant (a unique protein structure) in one of the Peking Man teeth preserved from the original dig (PA69). The variant, AMBN(A253G), was present in their H. erectus samples from the Hexian and Sunjiadong sites and has not been identified in any other primate, which suggests that these populations inherited it from a common ancestor. This sample also shared the AMBN(M273V) variant which has only been identified in Denisovans, and might suggest that Denisovans inherited this variant from interbreeding with local East Asian H. erectus populations like the Peking Man.

A 2021 phylogeny of H. erectus using tip dating:

- Homo (2.85 million years ago)
  - H. habilis
  - H. erectus
    - - Stw 53 (1.9 million years ago)
      - Dmanisi (1.8 million years ago)
    - - Turkana (1.7 million years ago)
      - - Olduvai Hominid 9 (1.5 million years ago)
        - - Sangiran (1.4 million years ago)
          - - - - Nanjing Man (0.6 million years ago)
                - Peking Man (0.5 million years ago)
              - - Hexian (0.5 million years ago)
                - - Sambungmacan (0.2 million years ago)
                  - Ngandong (0.1 million years ago)
            - - H. heidelbergensis (Note: H. heidelbergensis is also a paraphyletic assemblage of fossils.)
              - - H. neanderthalensis
                - H. sapiens

== Anatomy ==
Peking Man is known from 13 skull and cranial fragments, 15 mandibles (lower jawbone), 157 isolated and in situ teeth, an atlas (the first neck vertebra), a clavicle, 3 humeri (upper arm bones), potentially 2 iliac fragments (the hip), 7 femora, a tibia (shinbone), and a lunate bone (a wrist bone). The material may represent as many as 40 individuals.

Peking Man and anatomically similar East Asian contemporaries are sometimes referred to as classic H. erectus.

=== Skull ===
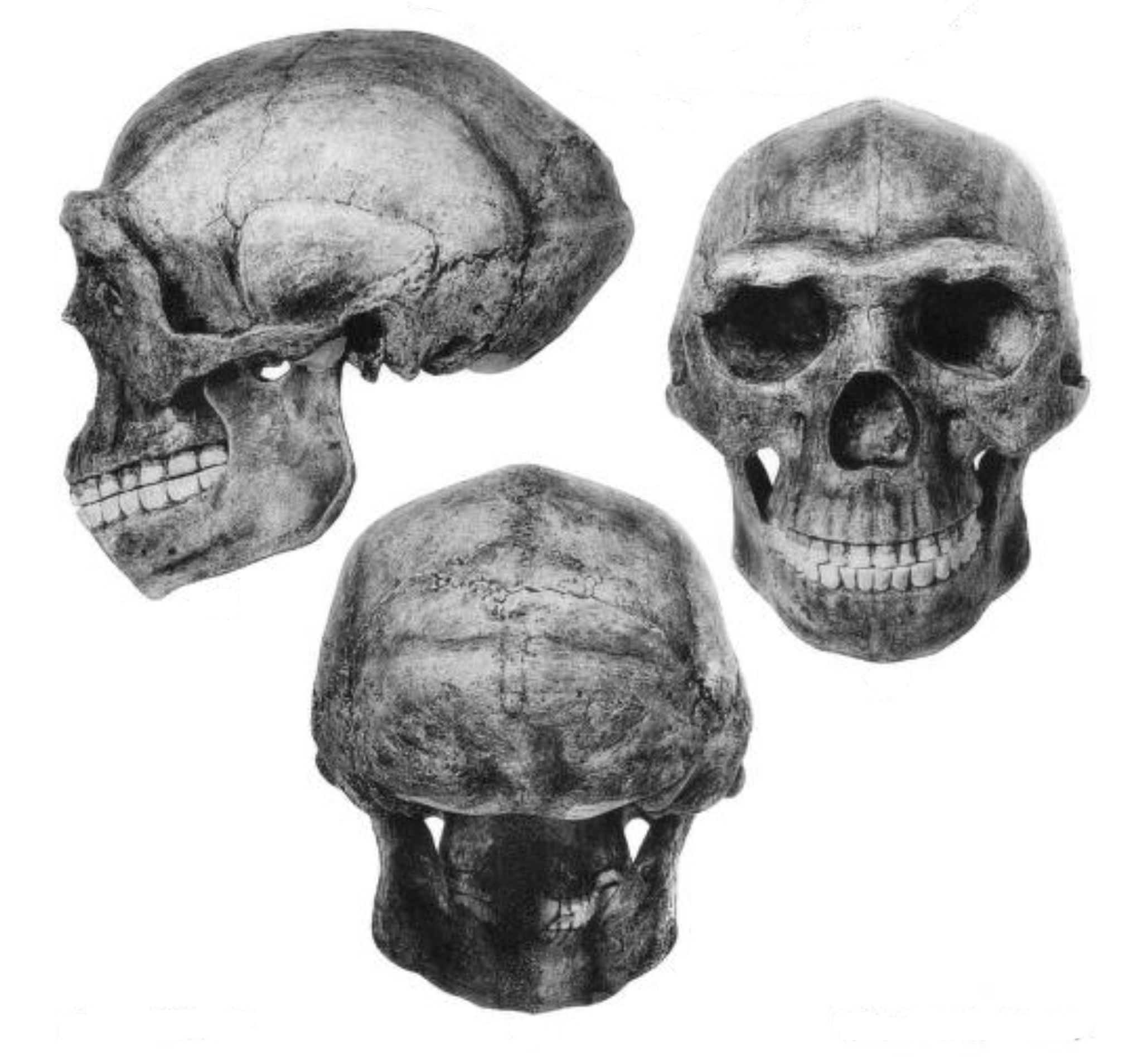
Weidenreich's 1937 reconstruction of a female Peking Man skull

In 1937, Weidenreich and his assistant, the sculptor Lucile Swan, attempted to reconstruct a complete skull, but only considered a skullcap (Skull XI), a left maxillary (upper jaw) fragment (Skull XII/III), and a right mandibular (lower jaw) fragment, which are presumably specimens of females based on their smaller size. Though larger, presumably male specimens are much more numerous, they probably chose female specimens because a male maxilla would not be discovered until 1943. Swan also made a lifelike bust of Peking Man based on this skull, nicknamed "Nellie".

In 1996, the anthropologists Ian Tattersall and Gary Sawyer revised the skull with high-quality casts of six presumed-male specimens and three isolated teeth (as the original fossils were lost). With this extended sample, virtually the entire skull could be more accurately restored, except the bottom margin of the piriform aperture (the nose hole). They deflated the cheeks and inflated the lateral margins of the brow ridge, which caused the nose to project out even farther (increased midfacial prognathism), though they reduced subnasal prognathism. Overall, compared to that of Weidenreich and Swan, their reconstruction is less apomorphic (specialised) than other Asian or African (Note: African H. erectus are sometime classified as H. ergaster or H. e. ergaster.) H. erectus specimens.

==== Cranial vault ====
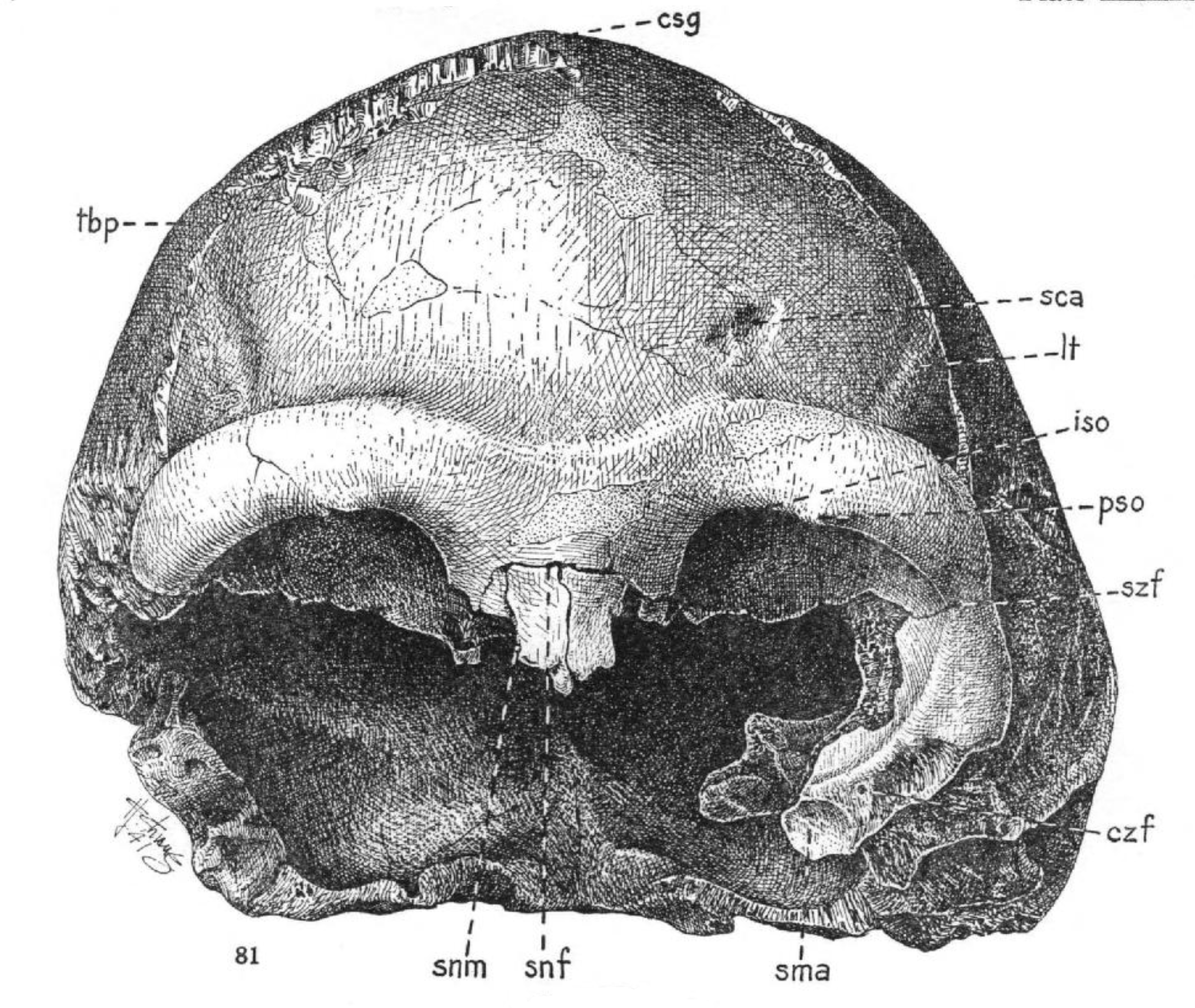
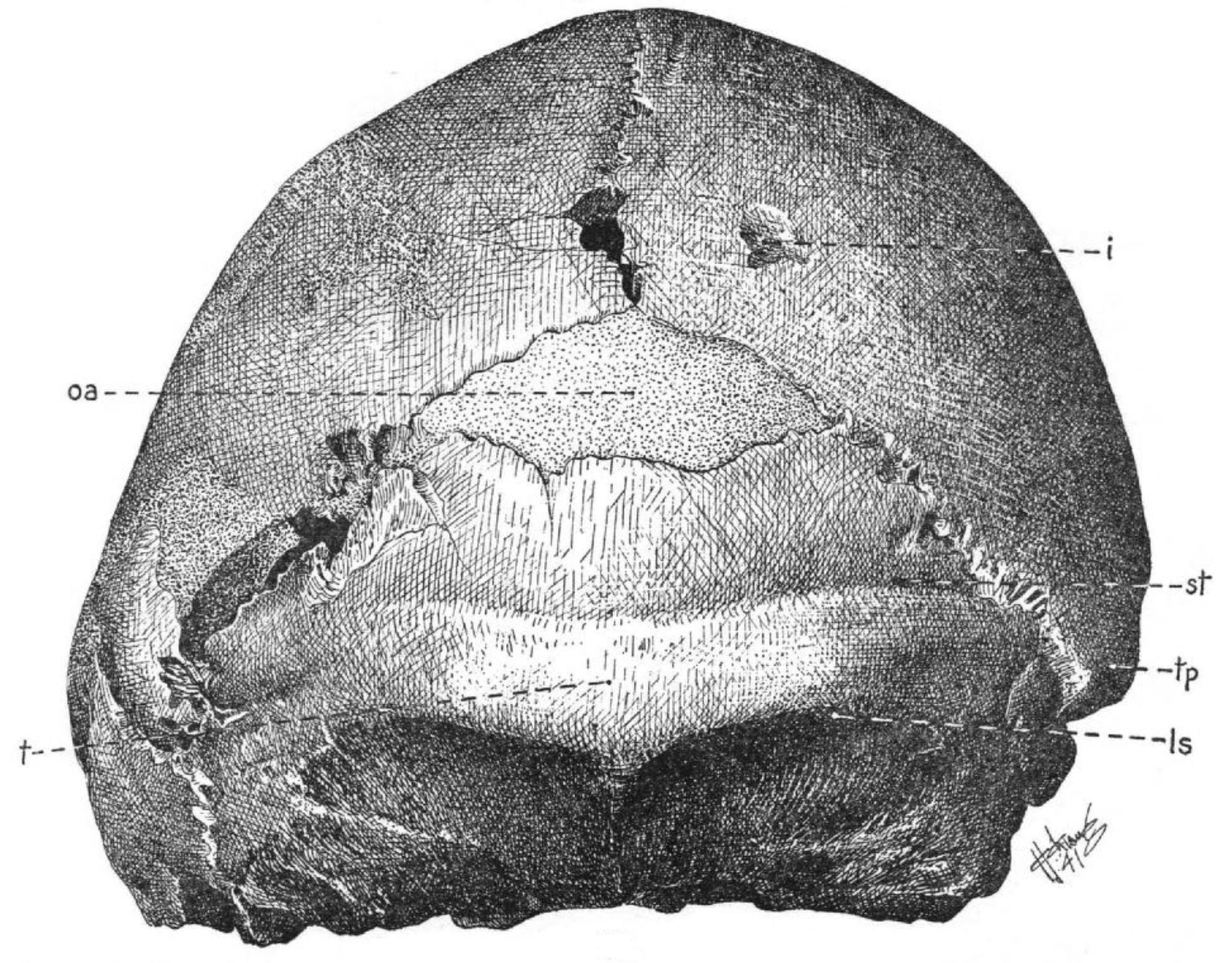
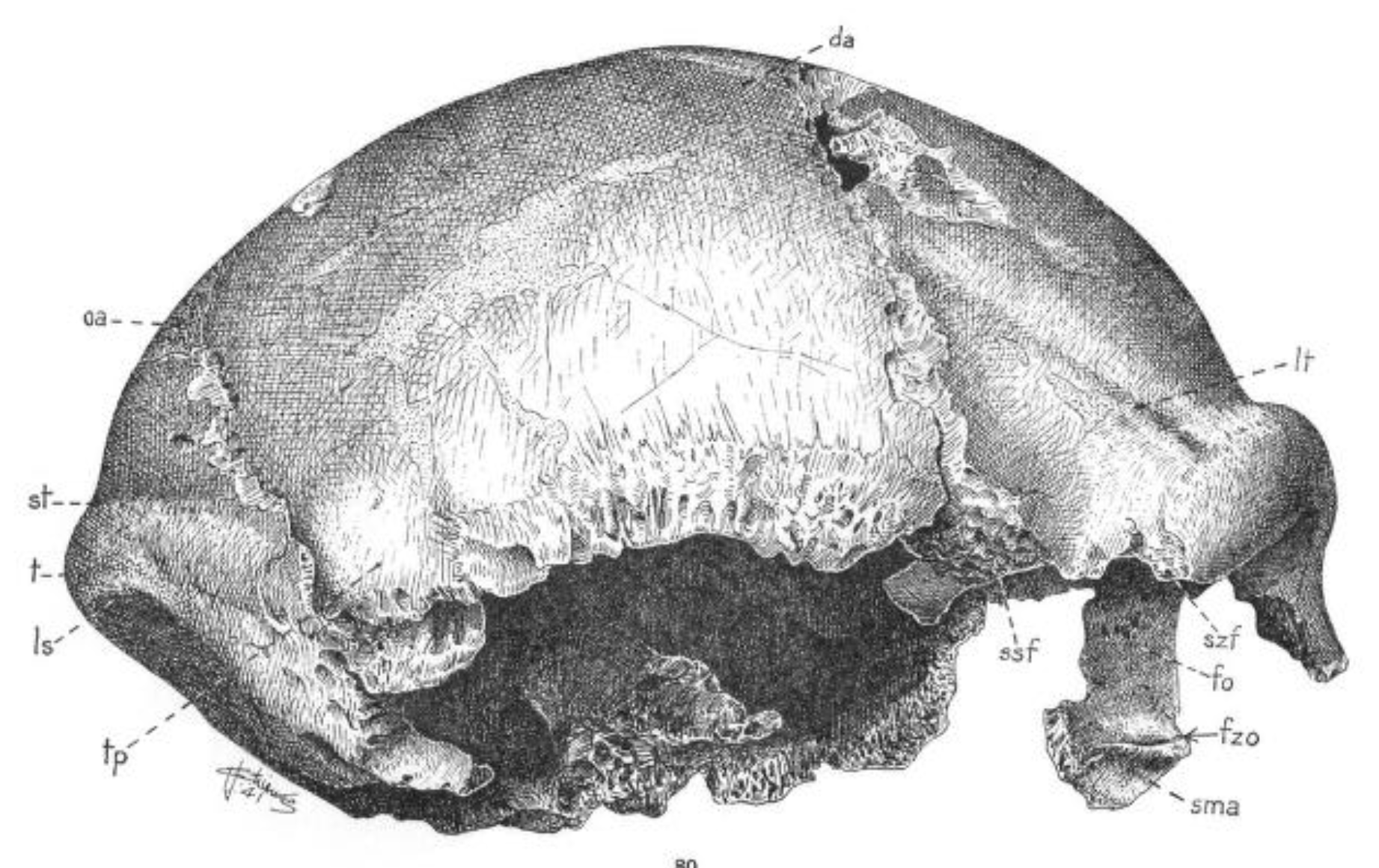
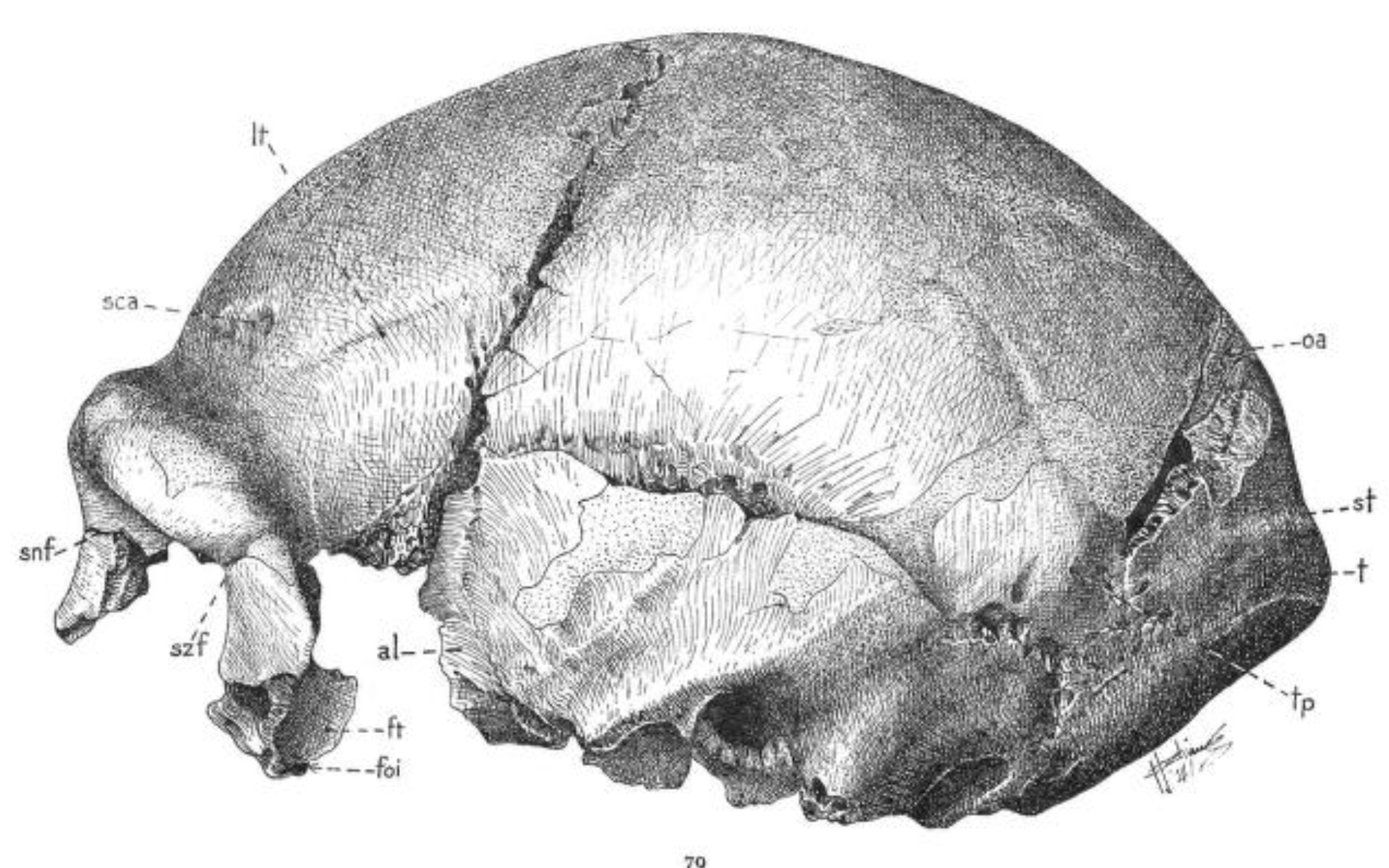
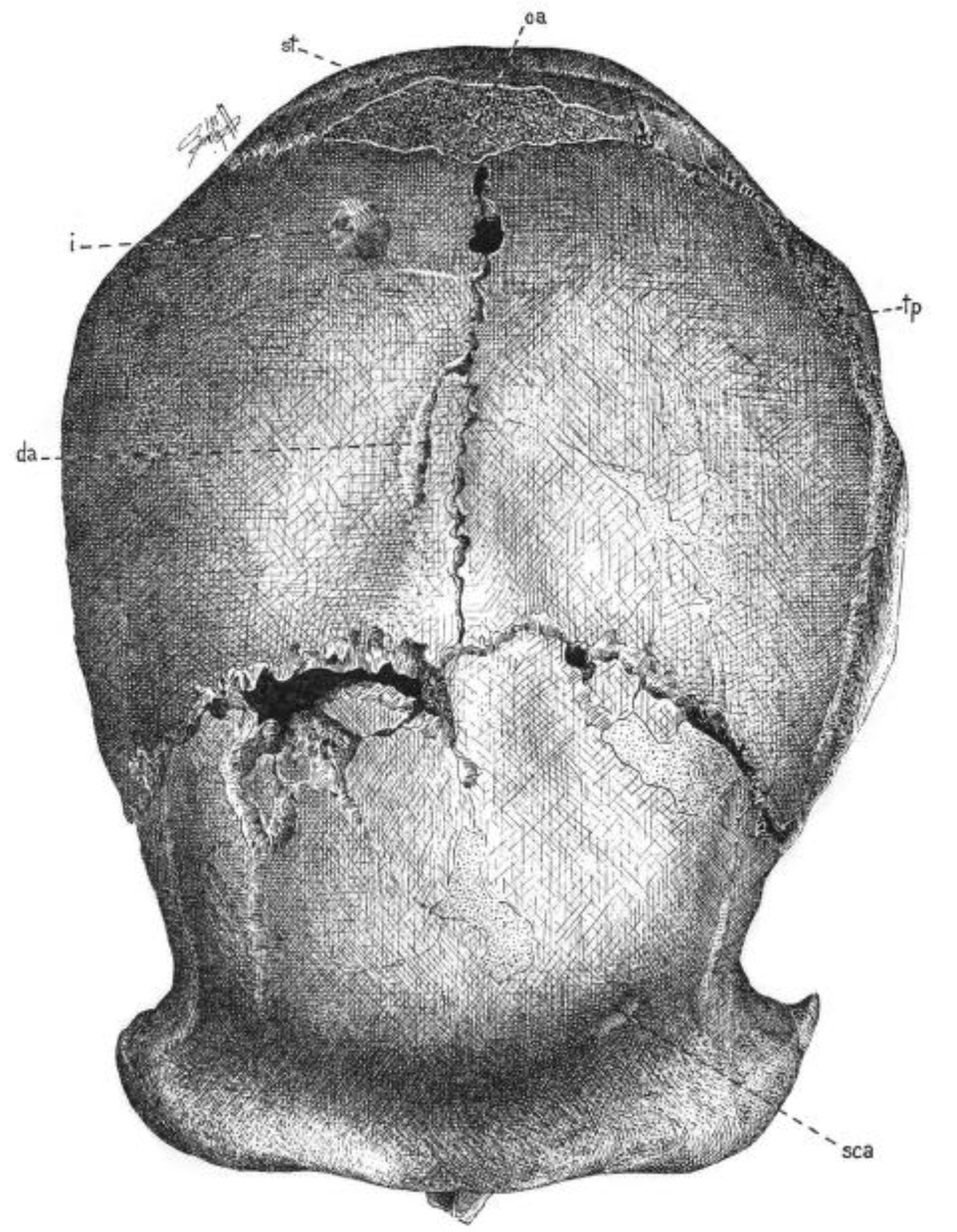
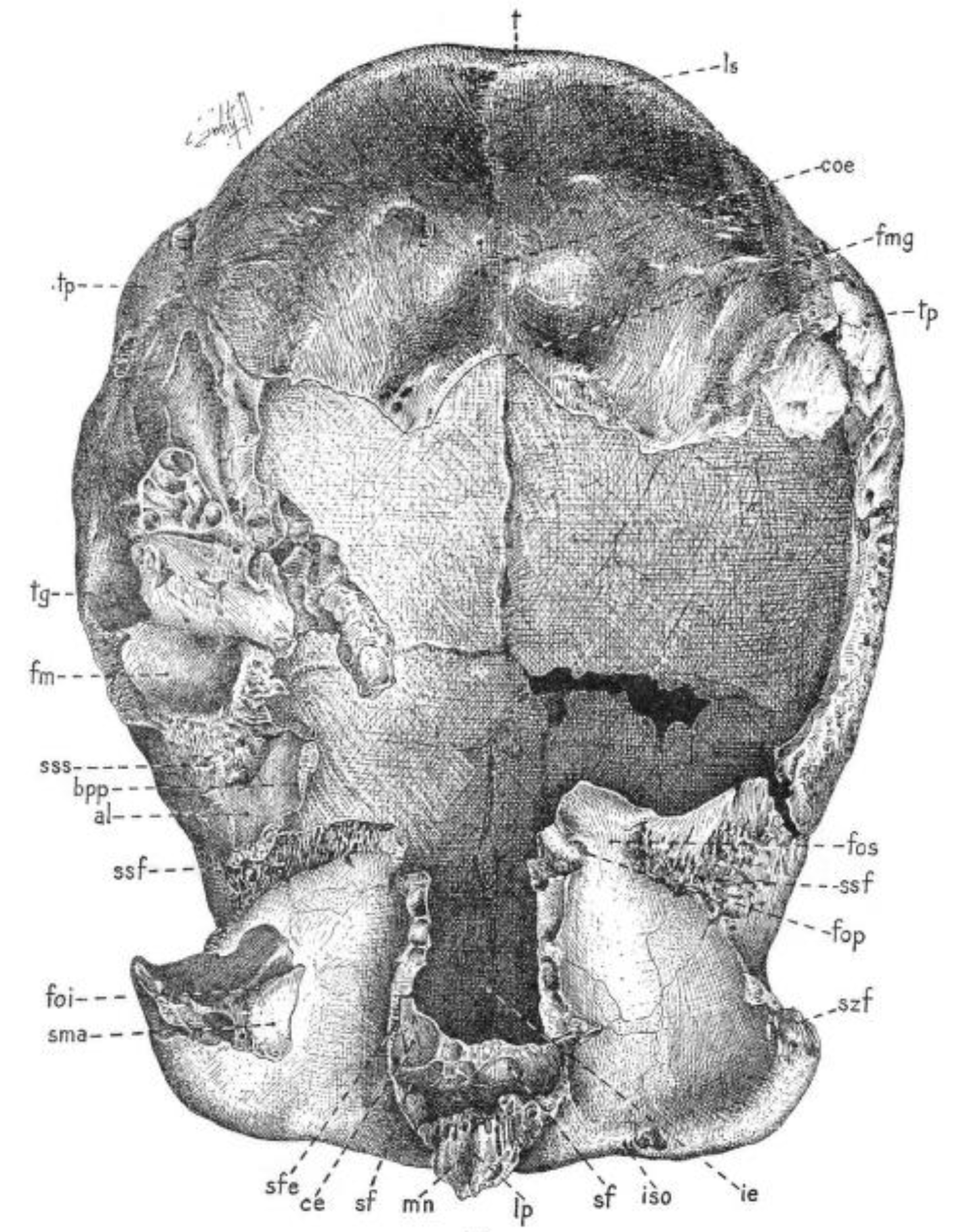
From left to right: illustrations of Skull XII by Franz Weidenreich showing the front, back, right, left, top, and bottom

Weidenreich characterised the Peking Man skull as relatively low, ellipsoid, and long. The breadth is greatest at the ears but decreases frontwards, especially at the forehead. There is marked post-orbital constriction, and the skull is circumscribed by a bony torus which is strongest at the brow ridge (supraorbital torus) and at the back of the skull (occipital torus). All specimens have an eminence projecting just above the brow ridge, developed to varying degrees, which is not found in any other H. erectus population. The frontal sinuses are restricted to the nasal area below the brows, and consequently the brow ridge is completely solid, unlike that of Java Man. The eye sockets are wide. The superior orbital fissure in the eye socket was probably a small opening like in non-human apes rather than a long slit like in modern humans. The nasal bones between the eyes are double the width of those of the average modern human, though not as wide as those of Neanderthals. Weidenreich suggested Peking Man had a short, broad nose.

Peking Man also features a sagittal keel running across the midline, highest when it intersects the coronal suture halfway across, and recedes around the obelion (near the base of the parietal bones). All skulls feature an equally developed keel (proportionally), including subadult and presumed-female specimens; there are no infant specimens. The keel produces a depression on either side, which accentuates the parietal eminence. The temporal lines, which arc in pairs across either side of the skull, often merge into a single ridge near the skull midline. The squamous part of temporal bone (the flat region) is positioned quite low, and the temporal fossa (the depression between the temporal lines and cheek) is relatively narrow. The mastoid part of the temporal bone features a high crest above which overhangs the ear canal. The crest accentuates the mastoid process, which bends inwards as opposed to the modern human condition of being vertical; bending is much more pronounced in presumed-male specimens. Peking Man lacks a true postglenoid process (a bony projection behind the jaw hinge); instead of being elongated, it is merely a low, triangular projection with a broad base. The zygomatic bones (cheekbones) project far off the face, and would have been visible when viewing the skull from the top. They project as far as 65 mm (2.6 in), whereas modern humans do not exceed 60 mm (2.4 in).

At the back of the skull, the occipital torus extends in a relatively straight line, but curves downward at the sides of the skull. The occipital torus can be bordered by sulci (furrows) on the top and bottom margins (for muscle attachment), and the bottom margin of the torus gradually fades. The midpoint of the torus features an additional prominence, the occipital bun.

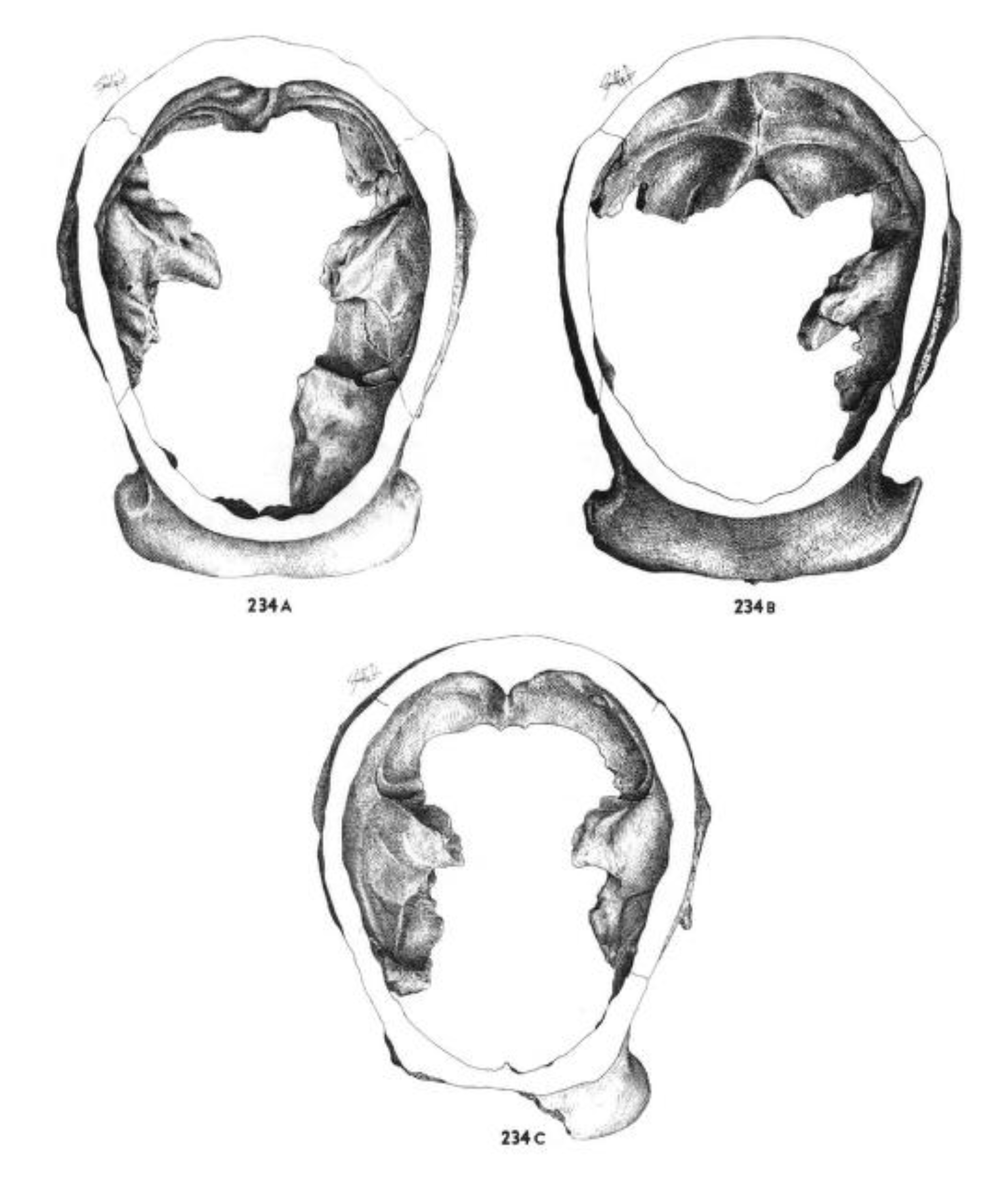
Cross sections of Peking Man Skulls III (A) and XII (B), and Java Man Skull II (C)

==== Brain ====
The brain capacities of the seven Peking Man skulls for which the metric is measurable range from 850 to 1,225 cc (52 to 75 cu in), with an average of about 1,029 cc (63 cu in). This is within the range of variation for modern humans. Asian H. erectus overall are rather big-brained, averaging roughly 1,000 cc (61 cu in).

The endocast (the cast of the inside of the braincase) is ovoid in top-view. Due to post-orbital constriction, the frontal lobe is narrowed like in other H. erectus. The parietal lobes are depressed unlike Javan and African H. erectus or modern humans, though this seems to be somewhat variable among the Peking Man material. The temporal lobes are narrow and slender unlike most other human species. The occipital lobes are flattened dorsoventrally (from top to bottom) and strongly project backwards which is a rather variable trait among archaic human populations. The cerebellum, compared to that of modern humans, is not as globular, and the lobes diverge more strongly from the midline like other archaic humans.

==== Mouth ====
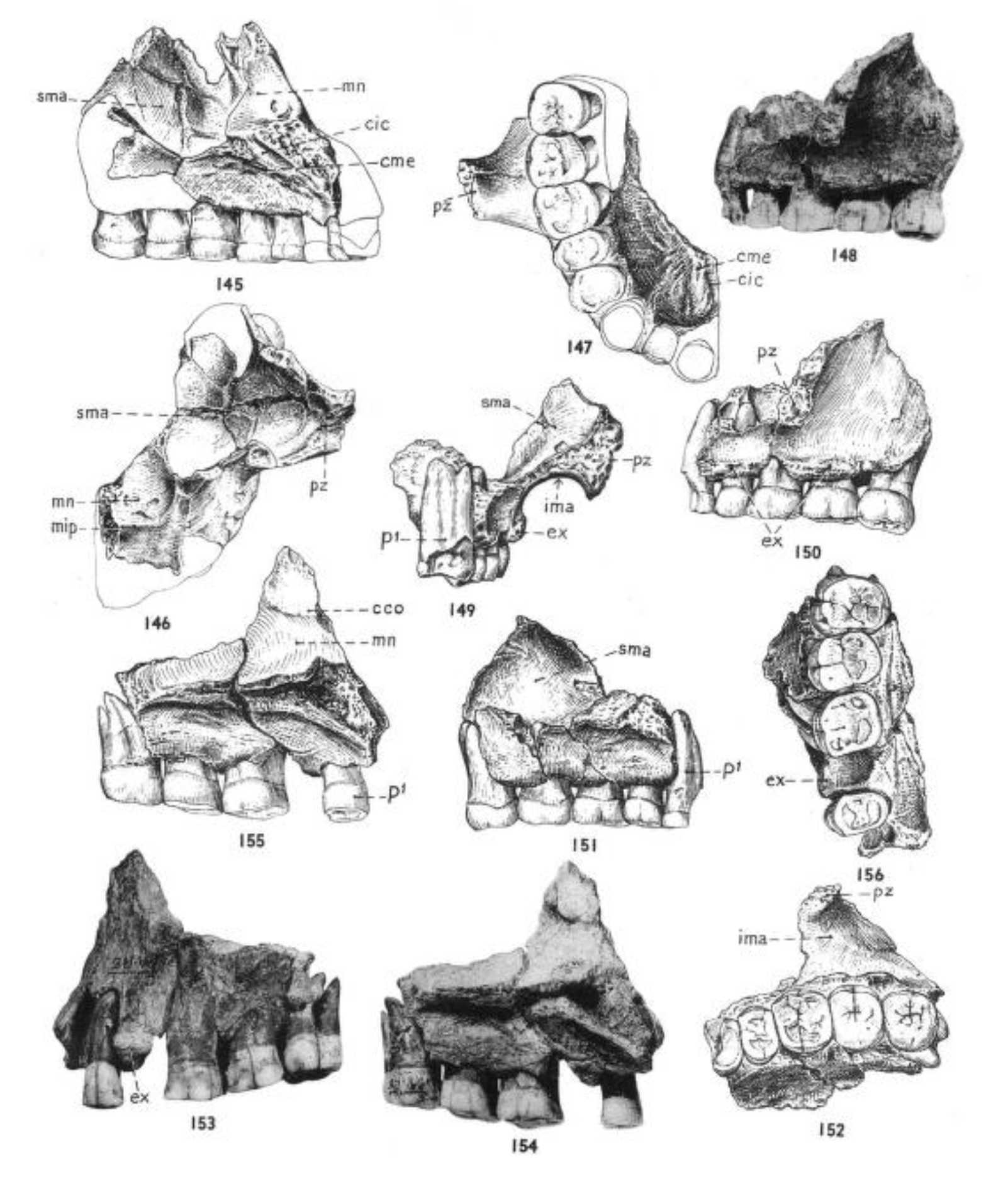
Maxillae from Skulls III, V, VI, and X

Peking Man has remarkably defined canine juga (a bony ridge corresponding to the tooth root). There is subnasal prognathism (the upper jaw juts out). The maxilla (upper jaw) commonly features exostoses (bony lumps) in the molar region, which infrequently occurs in modern humans (>6%). Like modern humans and Neanderthals but unlike Java Man, Peking Man has a long, rugose palate (roof of the mouth). The mandible (lower jaw) is rather big and, like other archaic humans, lacks a chin. The extramolar sulci bordering the cheek side of the molars are broad. Some mandibles feature a torus on the tongue side, or multiple mental foramina.

The dental arches (tooth rows) are U-shaped. The incisors feature an eminence at the base, finger-like ridges on the tongue-side, and for the upper ones marked shovelling (the tooth strongly bends in). The mandibular incisors are narrow. Weidenreich originally restored the teeth as peg-like, but Tattersall and Sawyer found the teeth to be much larger and obtrusive. Like other H. erectus, the premolars are ellipsoid and asymmetrical, but the first premolar (P_{3}) frequently has three roots instead of the more common two. The molar crowns exhibit several extraneous ridges in addition to the essential cusps, which produced a dendritic (branching) enamel-dentine junction, which has only been documented in Chinese H. erectus. M_{1} is rather long, and M_{2} is round.

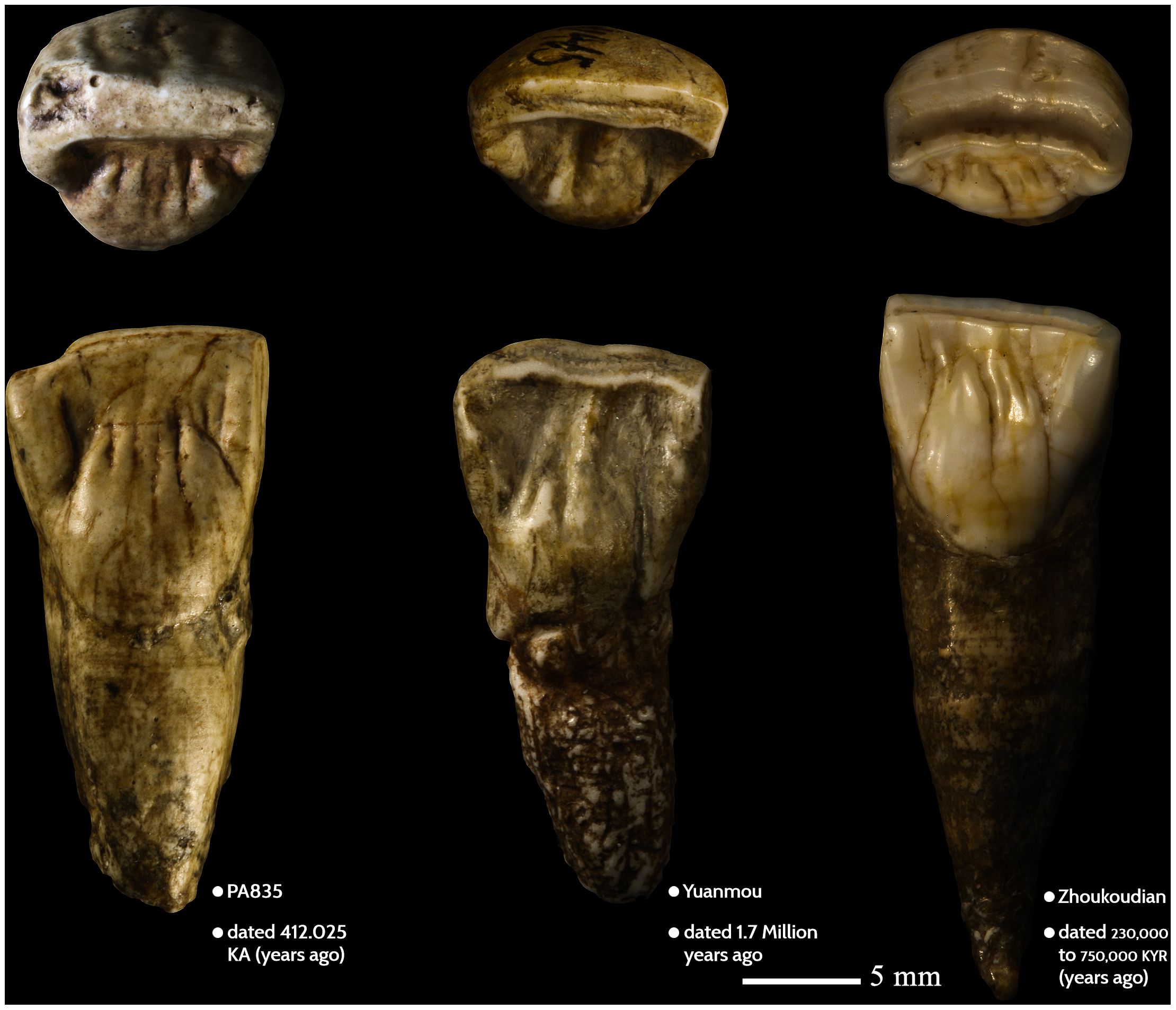
The shovel-shaped incisors of Chinese H. erectus (left to right: Hexian, Yuanmou, Zhoukoudian)

The upper incisors of Peking Man and other Chinese H. erectus feature marked shovelling, more prominent than in other H. erectus populations. Shovelling also usually occurs in Neanderthals and less intensely in many early modern human specimens across Europe, Africa, and Asia.

=== Postcranium ===
Because the archaeological record of East Asia is comparatively poor, the post-cranial anatomy of H. erectus is largely based on the adolescent African specimen Turkana Boy, as well as a few other isolated skeletons from Africa and Western Eurasia.

Externally, the Peking Man humerus is like that of modern humans, and exhibits exceptionally developed muscle attachments, but the diaphysis (shaft) is more slender. The lunate bone (in the wrist) is modern humanlike, though proportionally small and broad.

Compared to an average modern human, the femur is much stouter, flatter, slenderer, and straighter; maximum curvature occurs nearer the knee joint instead of at the mid-shaft. The anteposterior (from front to back) diameter is smaller than the transverse (from left to right) diameter. The femoral neck was probably truncated like in other archaic humans and non-human apes. The subtrochanteric crest terminates up at the greater trochanter with a bony growth, commonly exhibited in Neanderthals. These traits are not outside the range of variation for modern humans, though are quite rare.

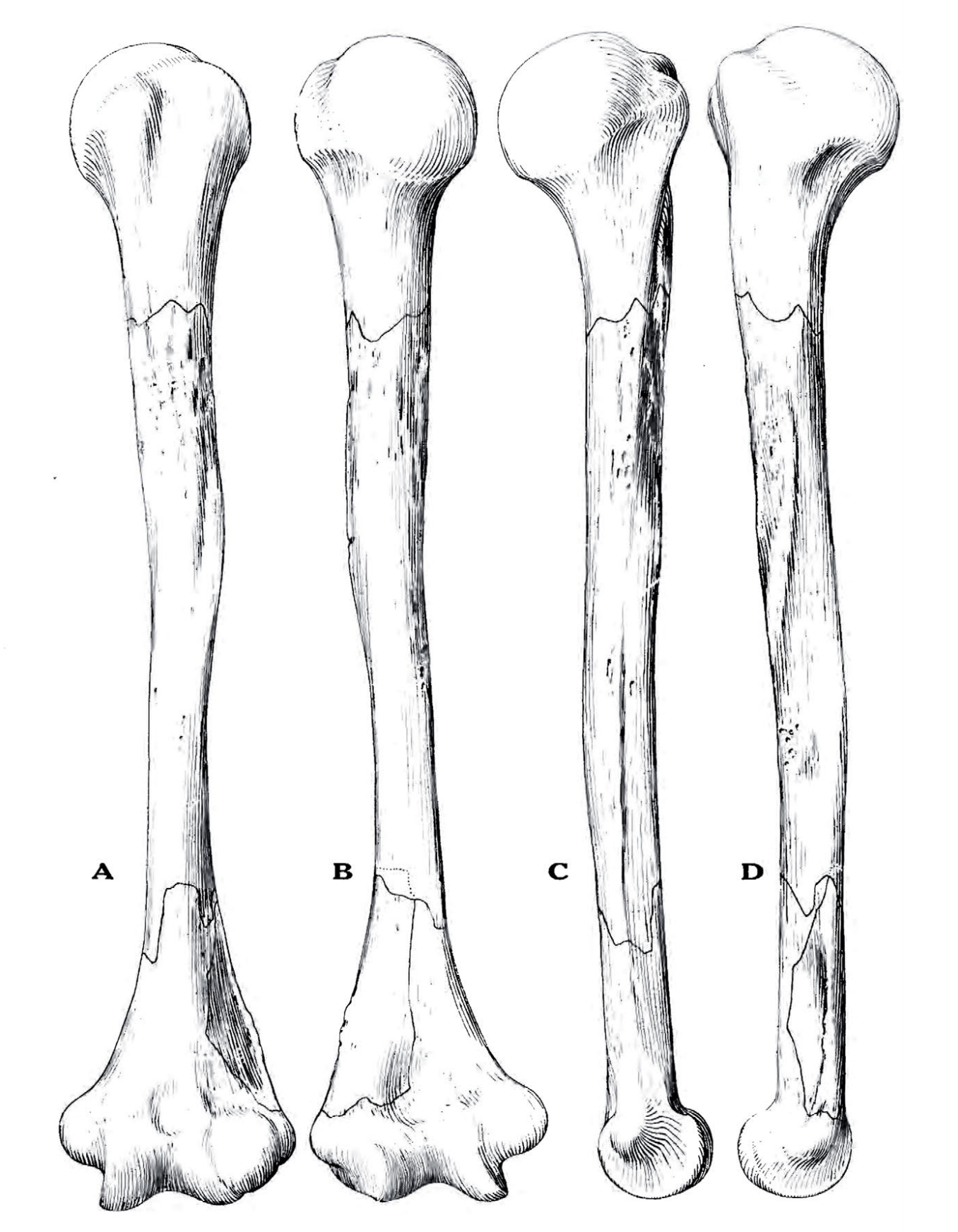
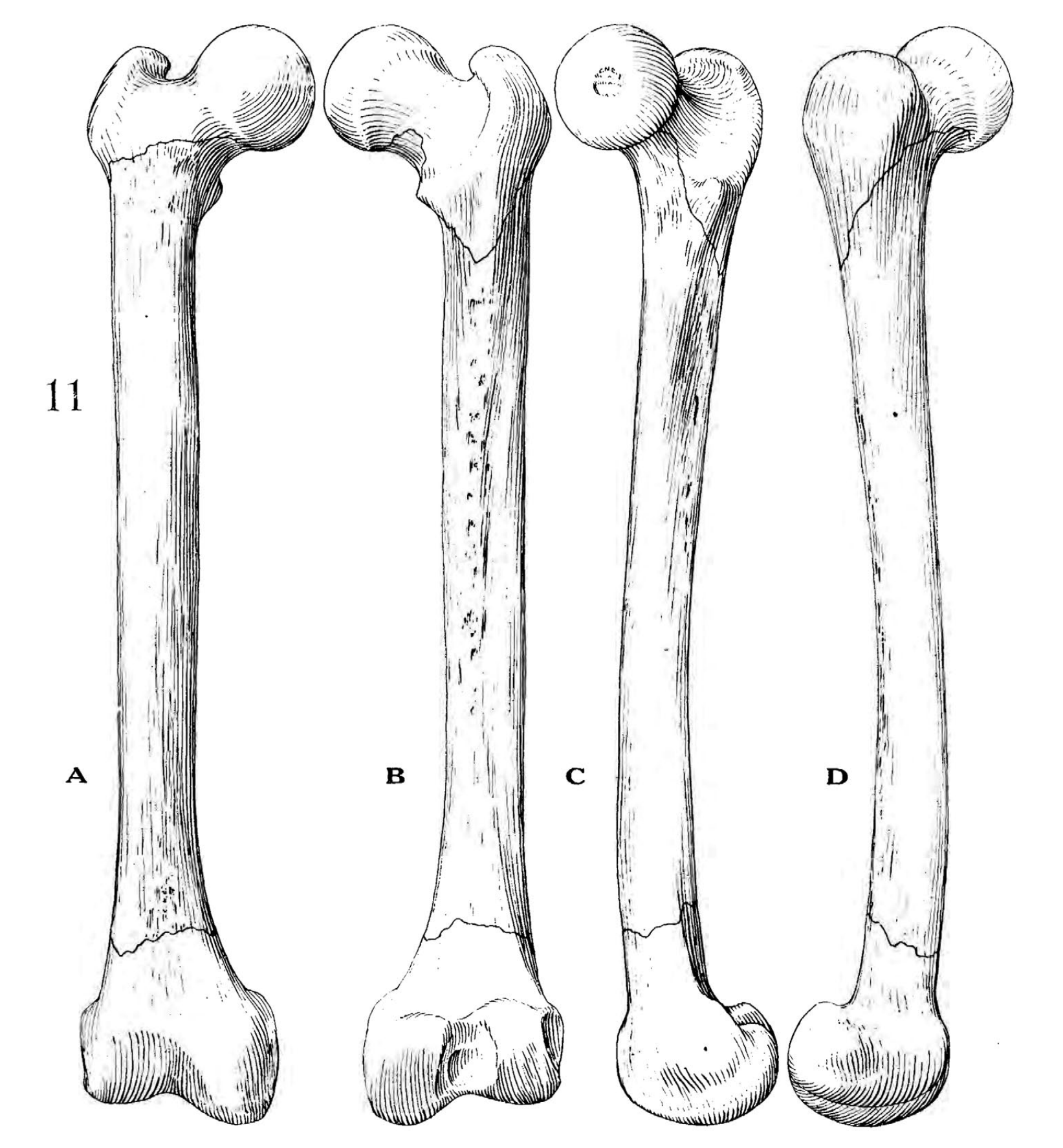
Weidenreich's reconstruction of Humerus II (left) and Femur IV (right)

=== Body size ===
The torso is poorly known, but because the limbs and clavicle are proportioned like those of modern humans, it is typically assumed the rest of the body was as well. Working under this assumption, living body dimension reconstructions include:

- In 1938, Weidenreich reconstructed a presumed-female femur to be 400 mm (1 ft 4 in) in length in life, which would equate to a female height of 152 cm (5 ft). He speculated males averaged 164 cm (5 ft 5 in).
- In 1944, Weidenreich reconstructed a presumed-male femur to be 407 mm (16 in) long, equating to a male height of 156 cm (5 ft 1 in). He speculated an average female height of 144 cm (4 ft 9 in).
- In 2018, the Chinese palaeoanthropologist Song Xing estimated the living weight for Humeri II and III as about 53.6 kg (118 lb), Femur I 54.8 kg (121 lb), Femur IV 54.3 kg (120 lb), and Femur VI 51.6 kg (114 lb). Weidenreich assumed all these represent males.

Northerly H. erectus populations tend to be shorter than tropical populations, with colder climate populations including Zhoukoudian and Dmanisi averaging roughly 150 cm (4 ft 11 in), and hotter climate populations including African and Javan H. erectus 160 cm (5 ft 3 in).

=== Bone thickness ===
The strongly developed tori and crests greatly fortify the skull, and the braincase is extremely thickened like in other H. erectus. Similar thickening can also rarely occur in modern humans when the diploë (the spongy cancellous layer between the two hard cortical layers of bone in the skull) abnormally expands, but for Peking Man, all three layers of cranial bone have equally thickened.

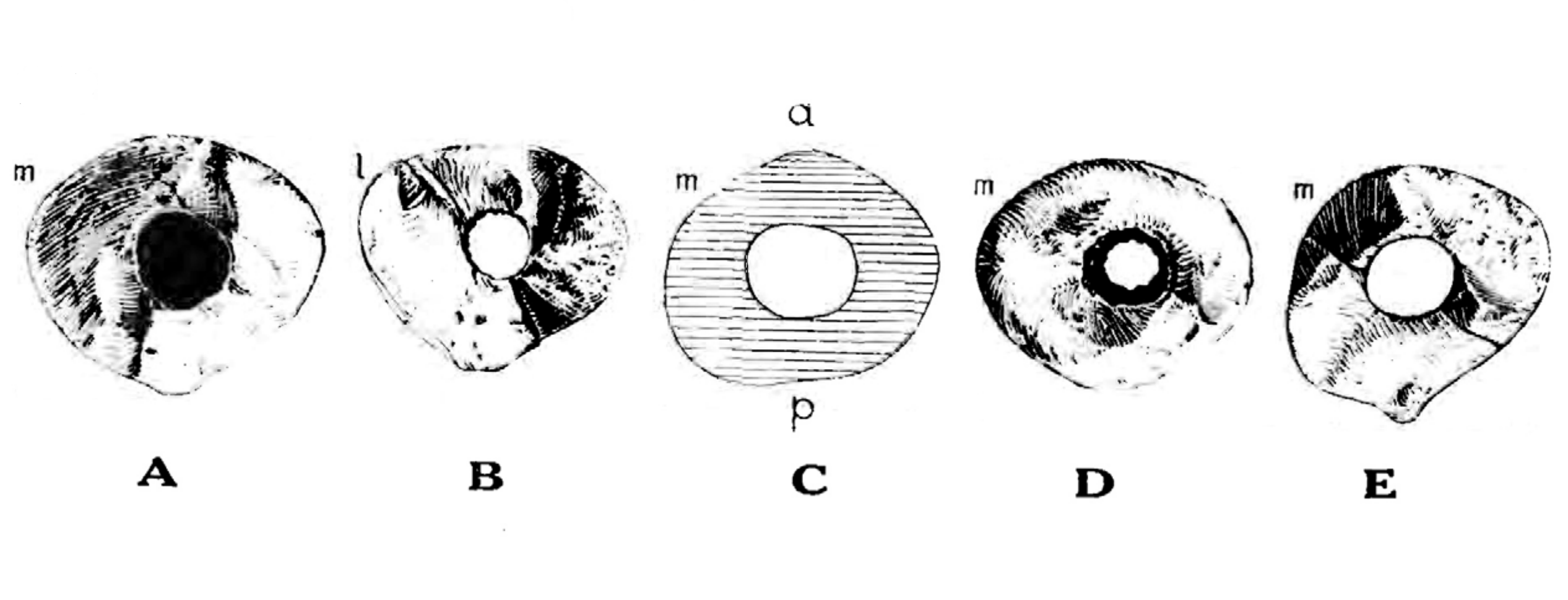
Mid-shaft cross-sections of Femora I, II, IV, V, and VI

The long bones of all H. erectus have thickened cortical bone and consequently narrowed medullary cavities (where the bone marrow is stored). Peking Man has much thicker humeri than African H. erectus. At maximum constriction at the mid-shaft, the femoral walls of Peking Man take up about 90% of the interior space, as opposed to only 75% in modern humans. For the lateral walls (towards the sides), the exorbitant thickness sharply reduces above the greater trochanter, whereas the medial walls (towards the middle) are three times as thick as those of modern humans. In modern humans, the femoral head features two main strips of cancellous bone (spongy interior bone) that converge into a triangle (Ward's triangle), which is absent in Peking Man, likely due to the intense thickening of the cortical bone.

In 1946, Weidenreich posited an unpopular hypothesis that Peking Man (and Java Man) inherited the thick bones from gigantic ancestors (plesiomorphy), evidenced by von Koenigswald's enormous Meganthropus and Gigantopithecus, which at the time were classified as ancient human ancestors. Other explanations include a far more violent and impact-prone lifestyle than other Homo, or pathological nutrient deficiencies causing hypoparathyroidism. The supraorbital torus thickens with age, and may be a response to bending stresses from habitual loading of the front teeth.

=== Gallery ===
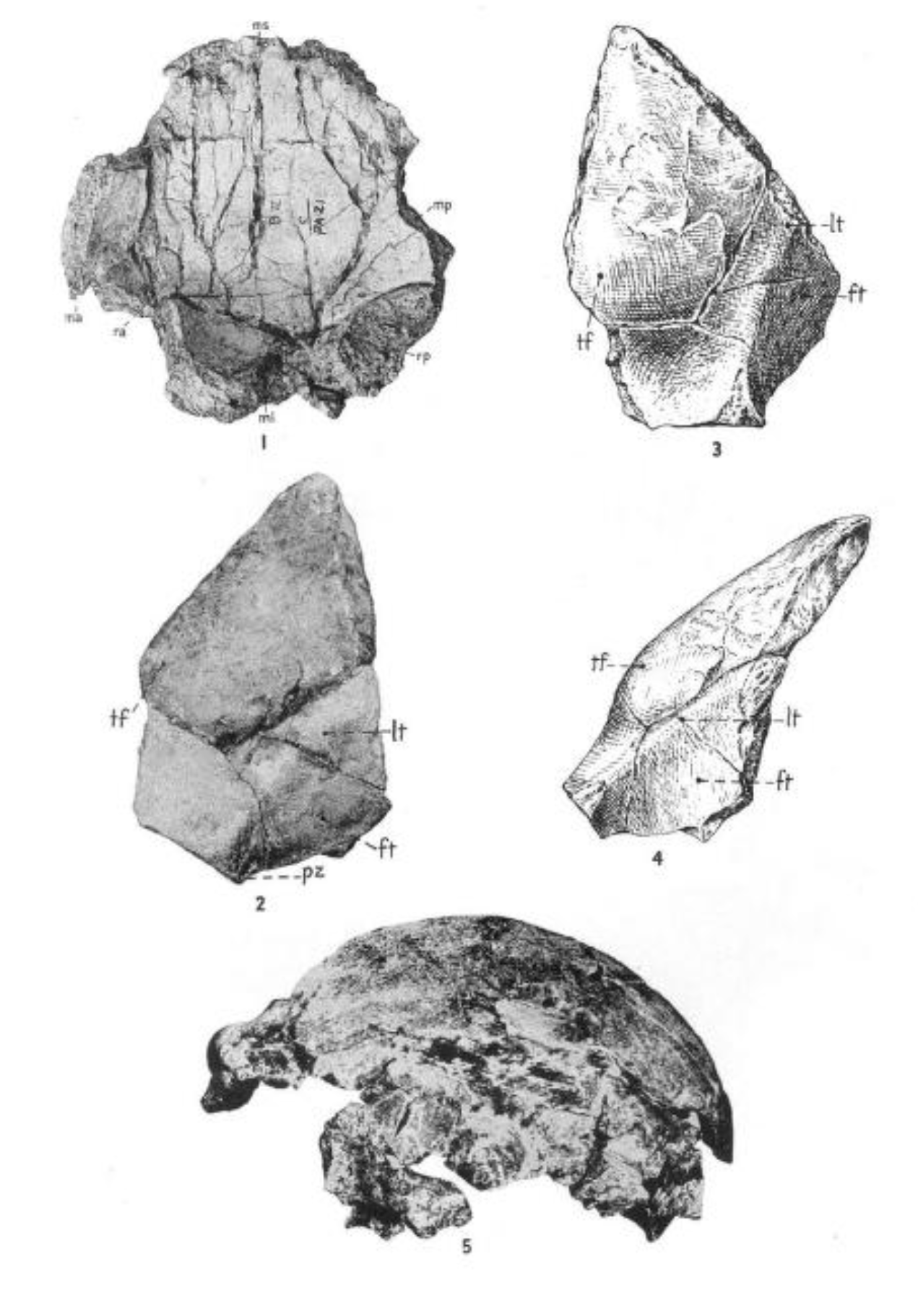
Skulls I and II

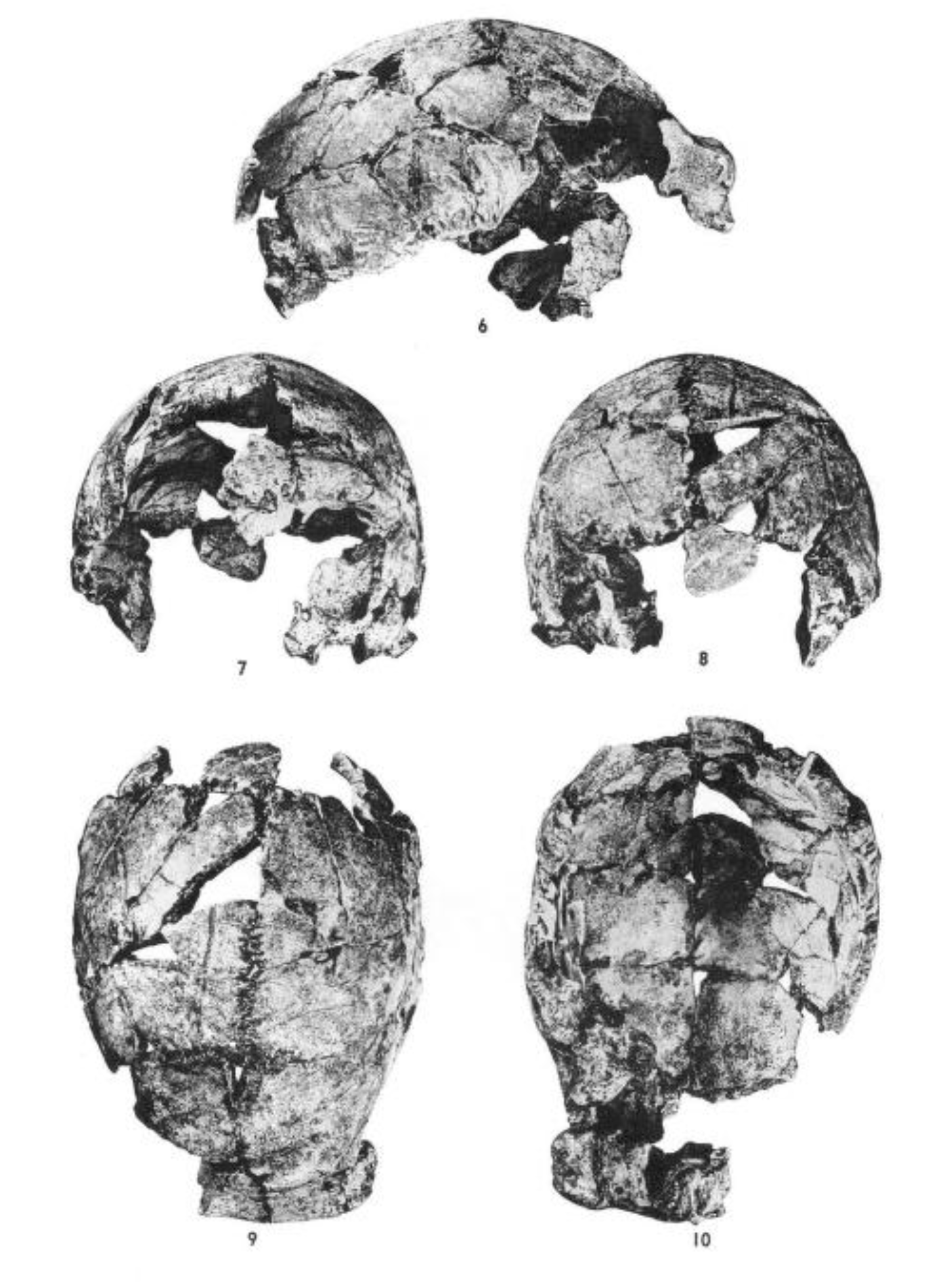
Skull II

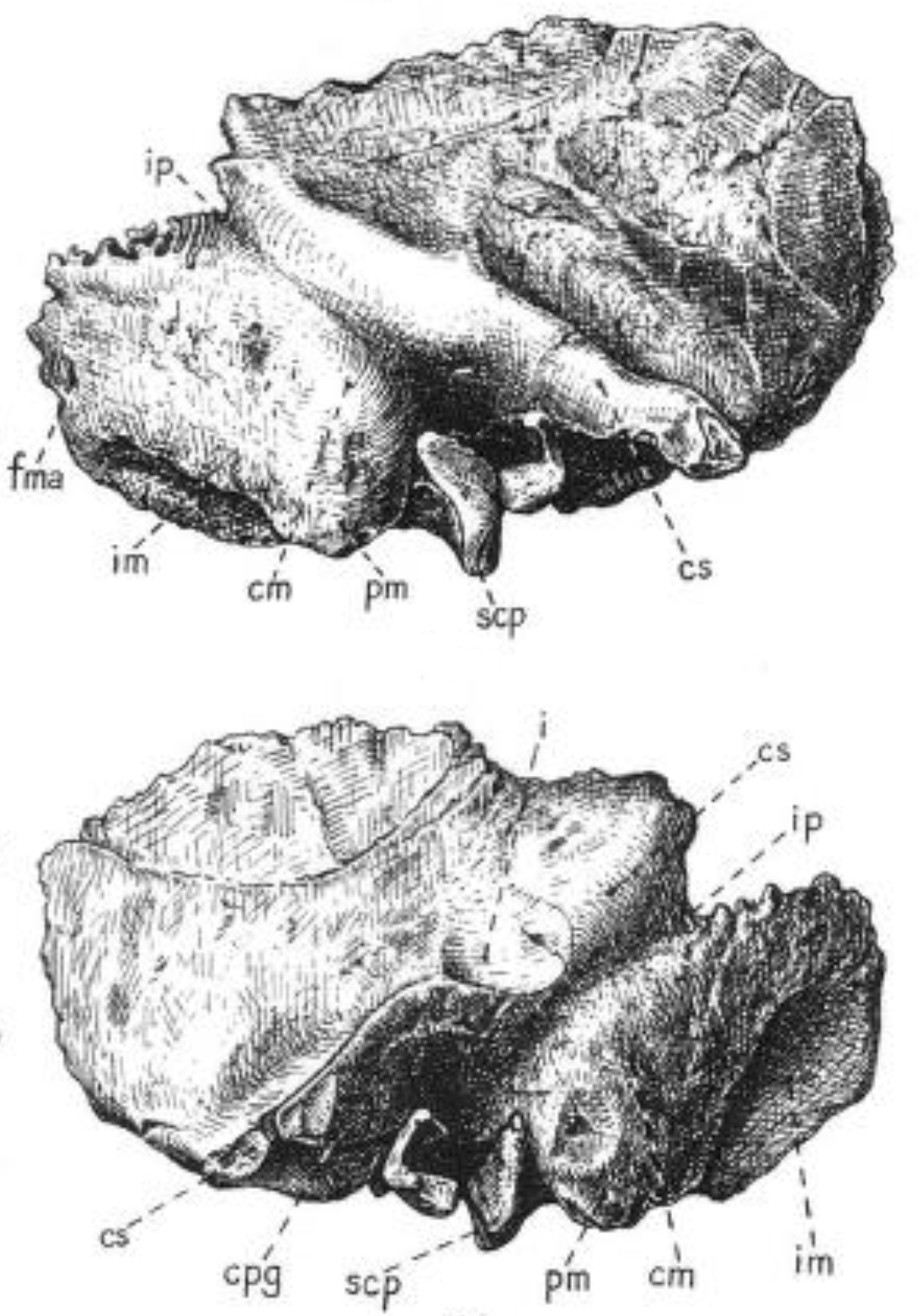
Skull III

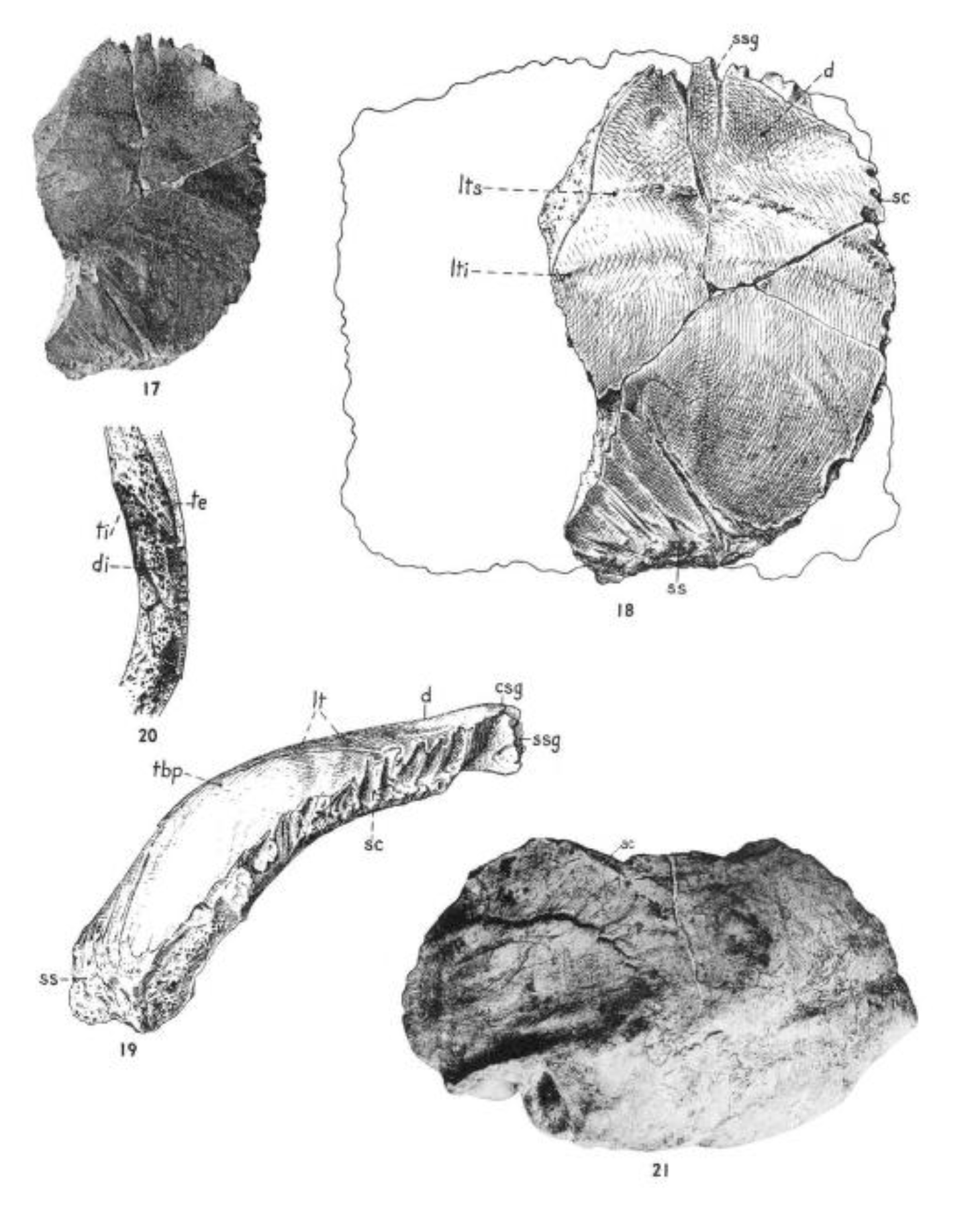
Skulls IV and V

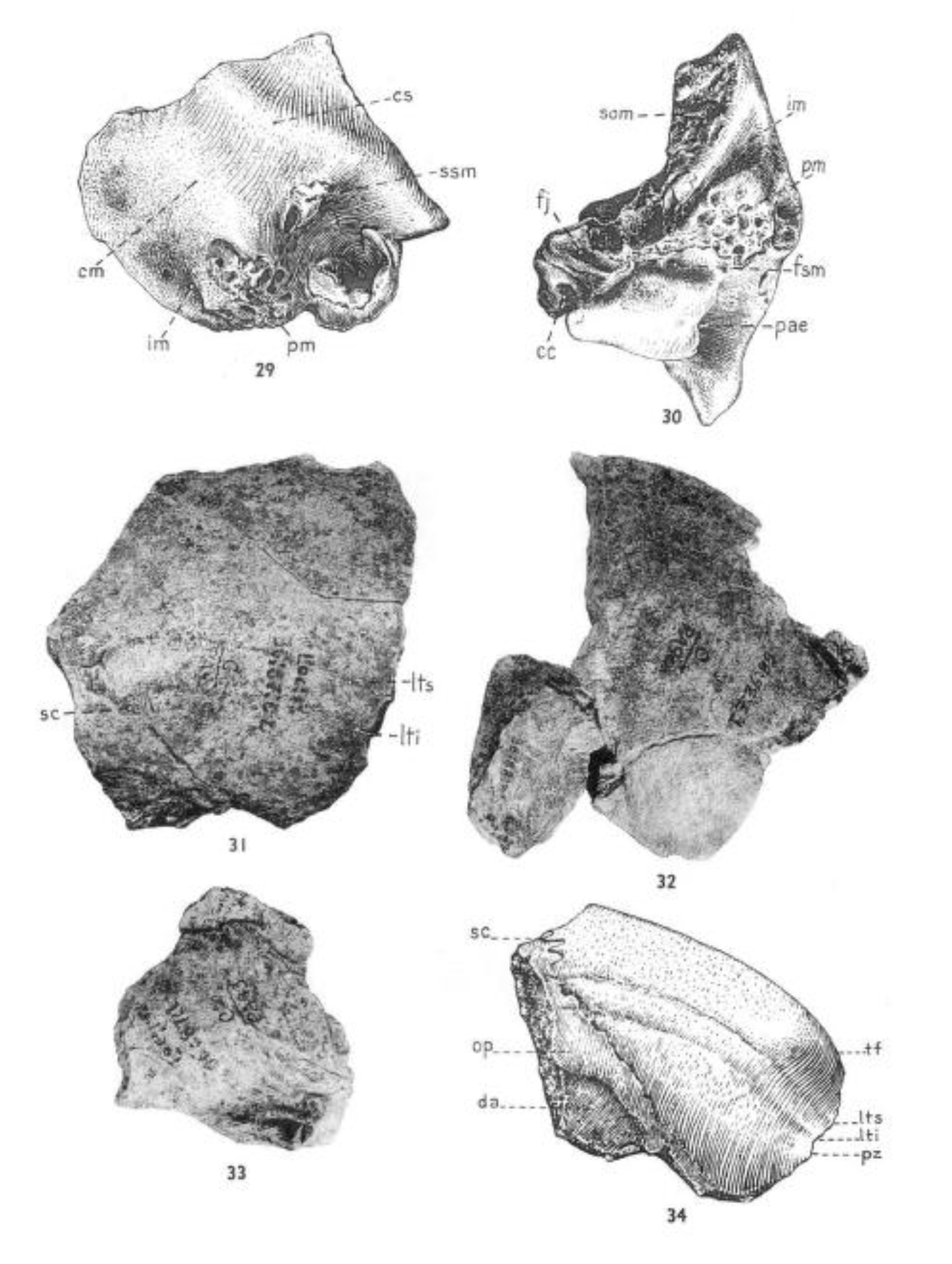
Skulls V and VI

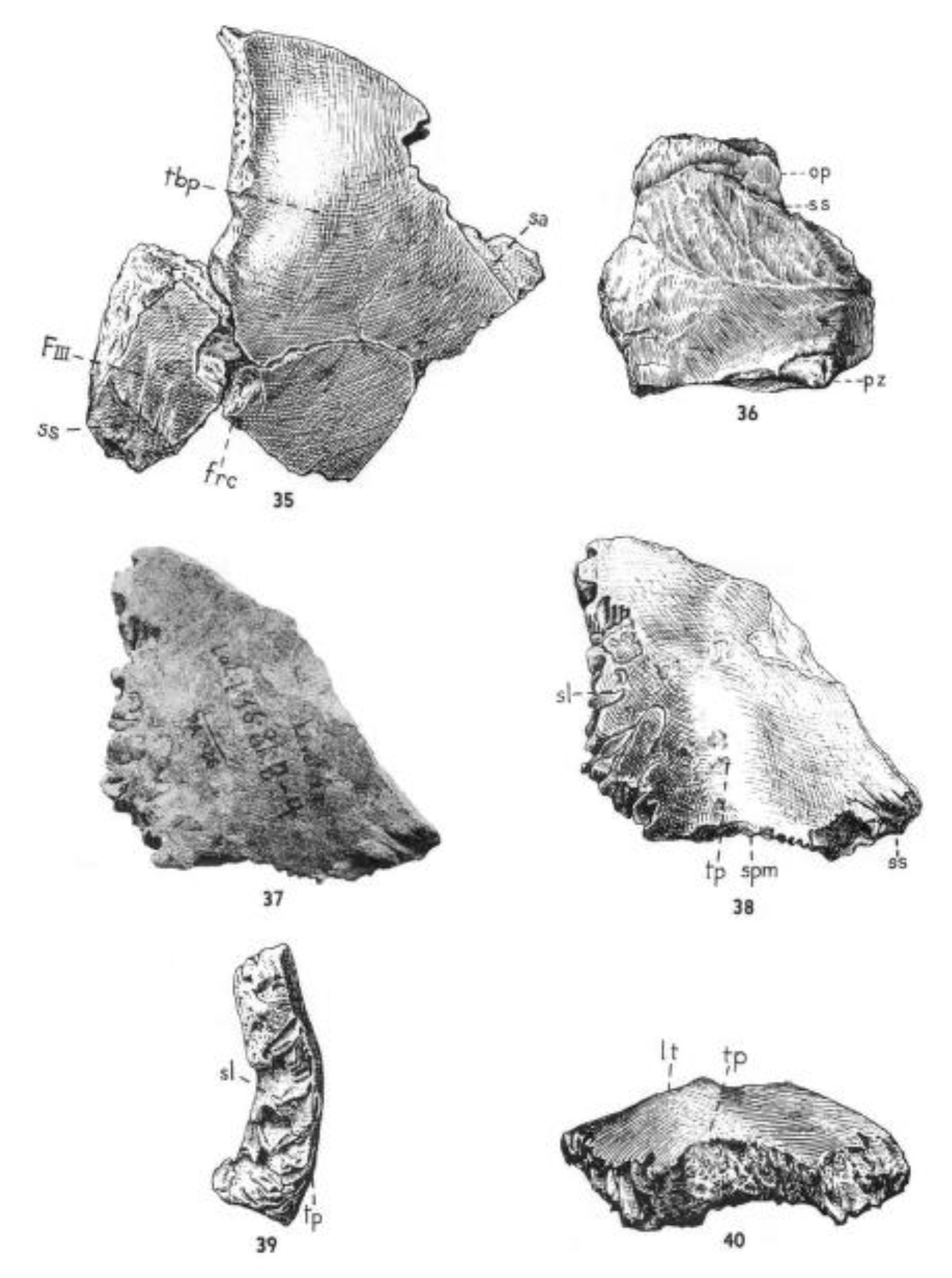
Skulls VI and VII

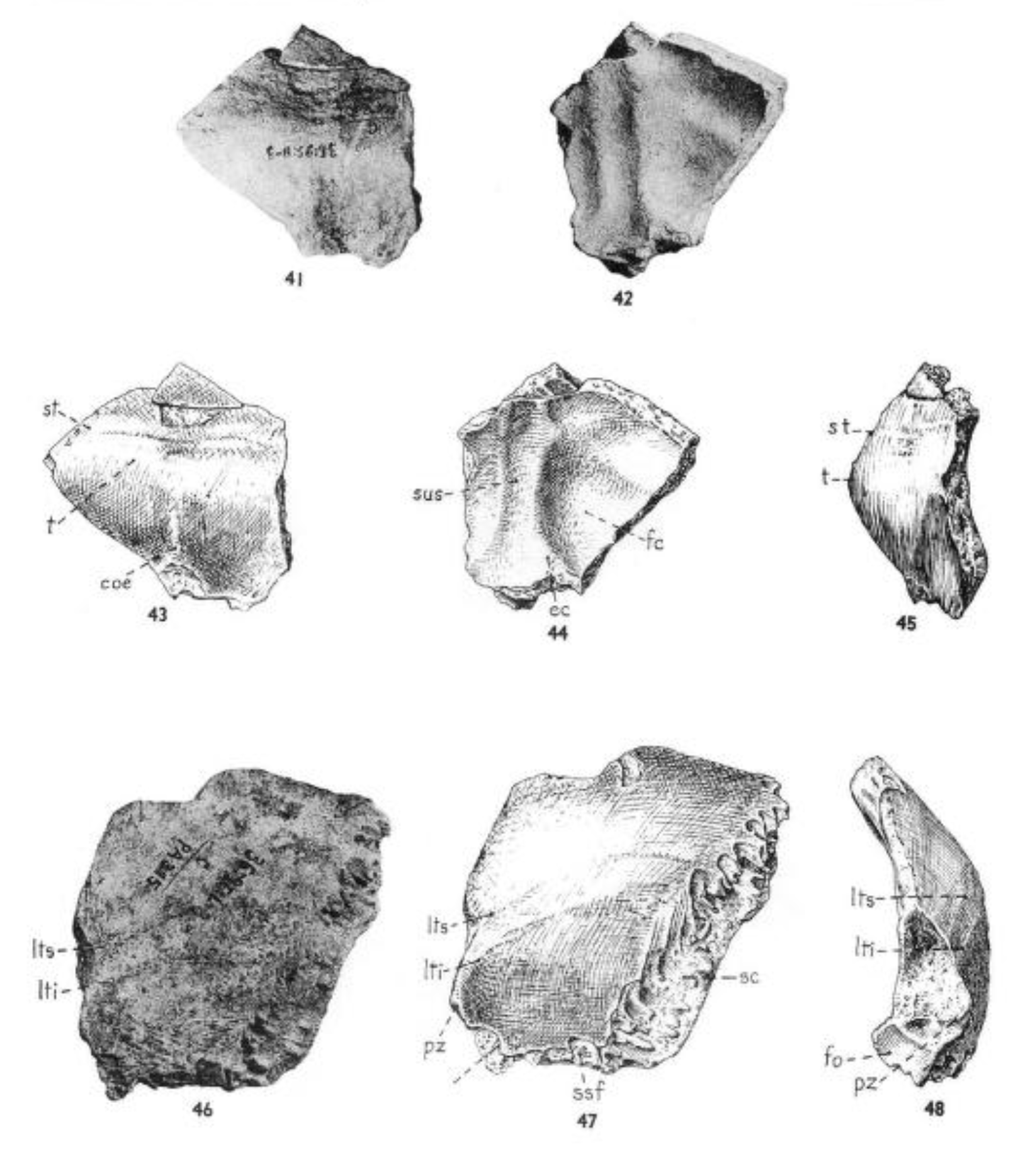
Skulls VIII and IX

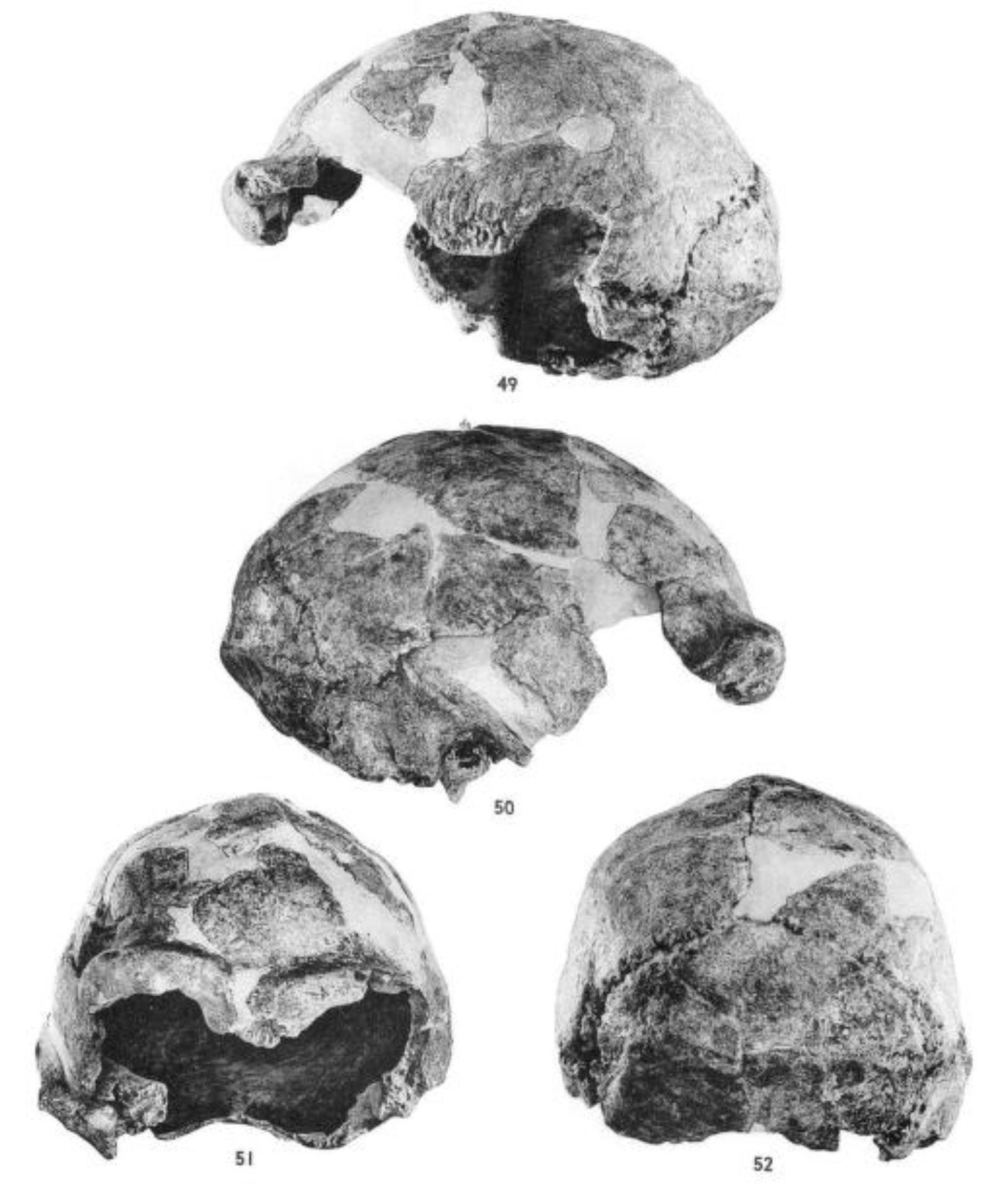
Skull X

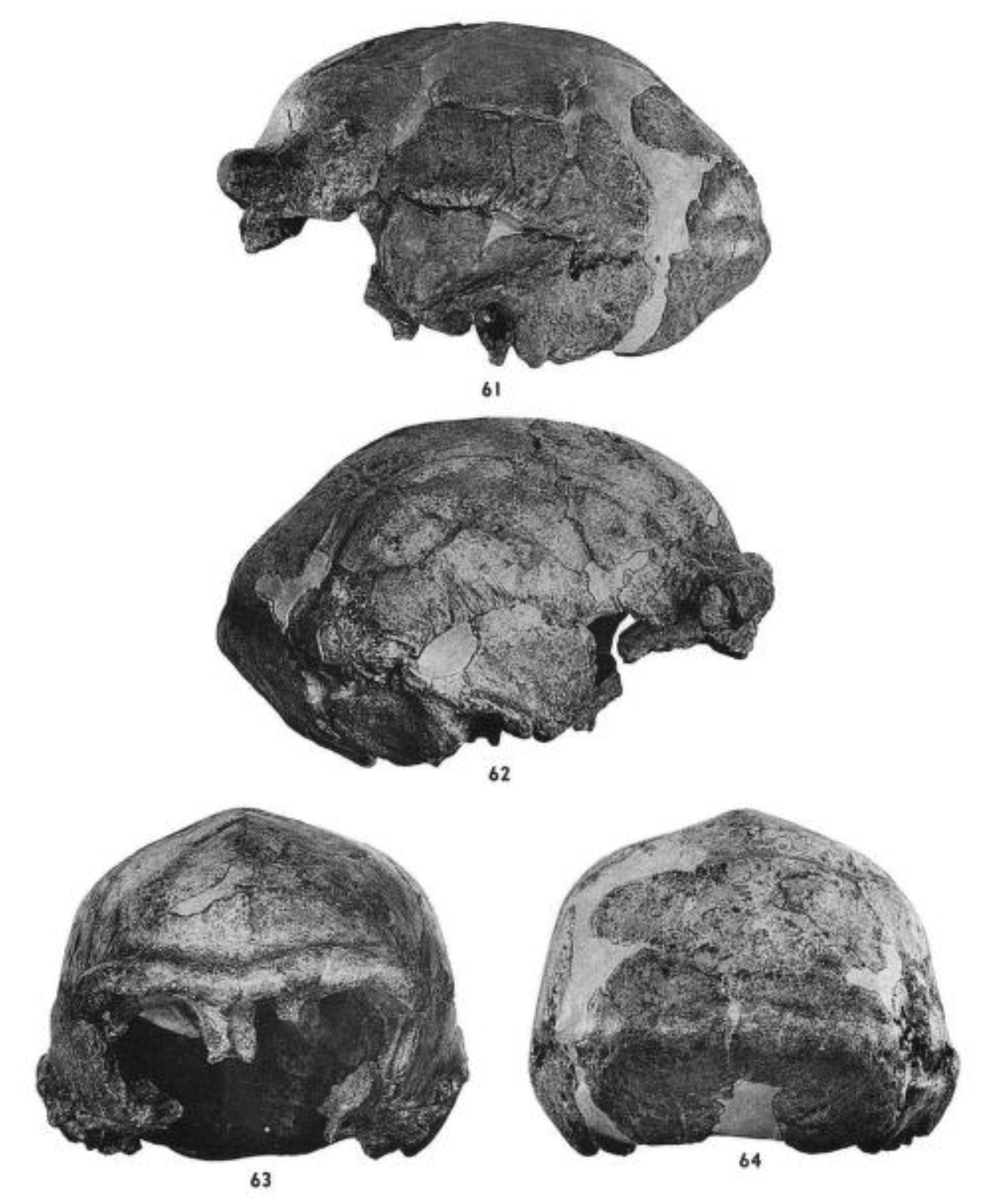
Skull XI

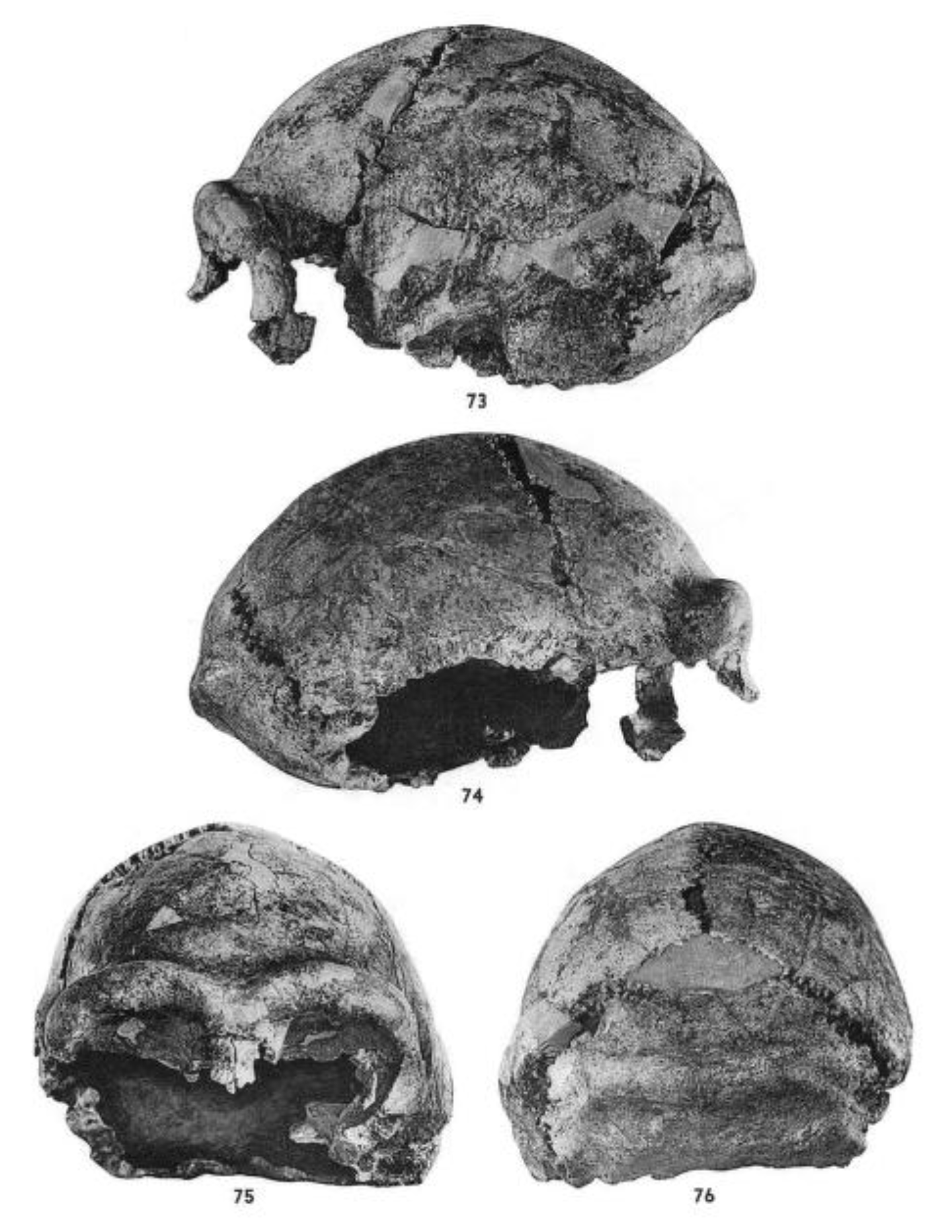
Skull XII

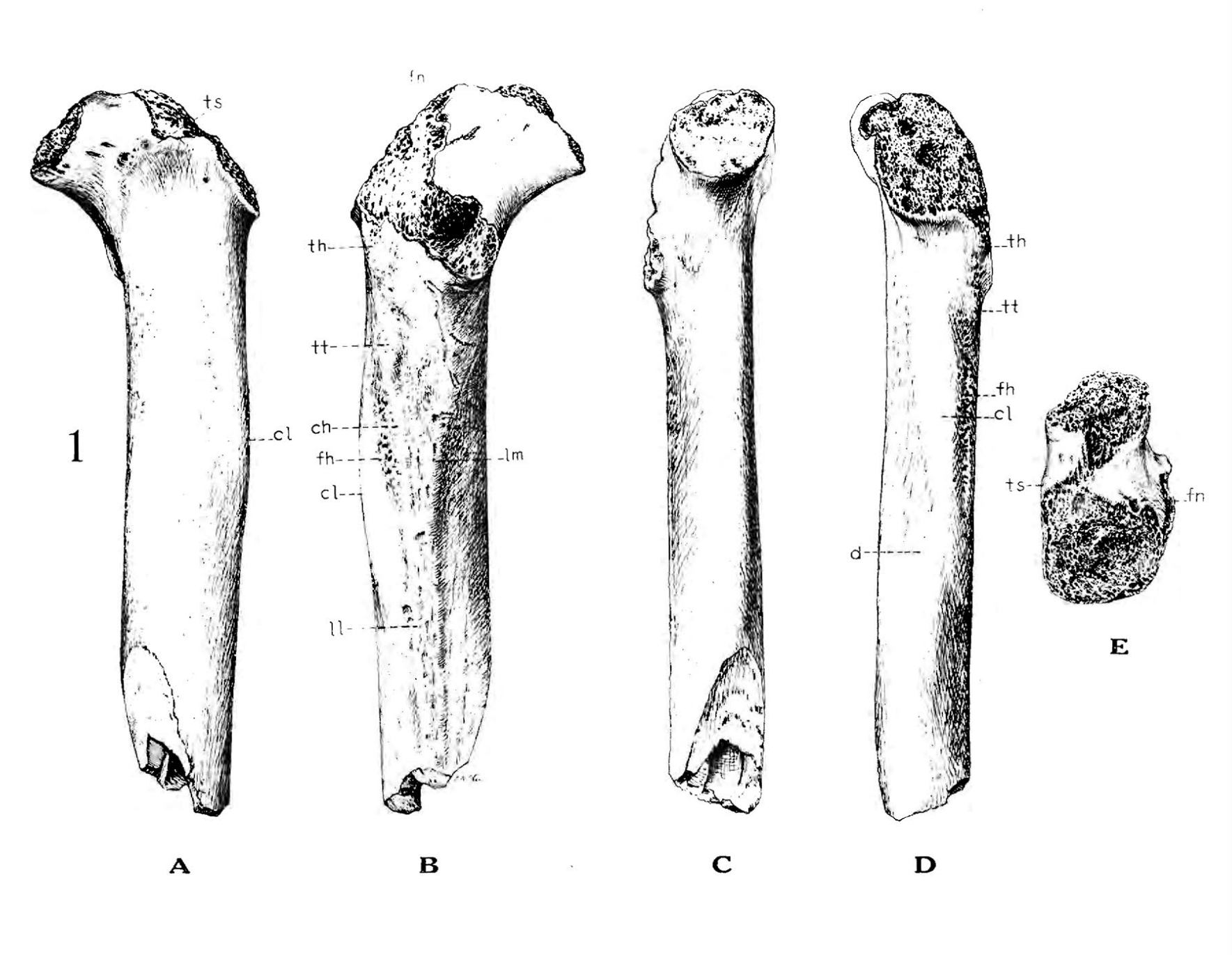
Femur I

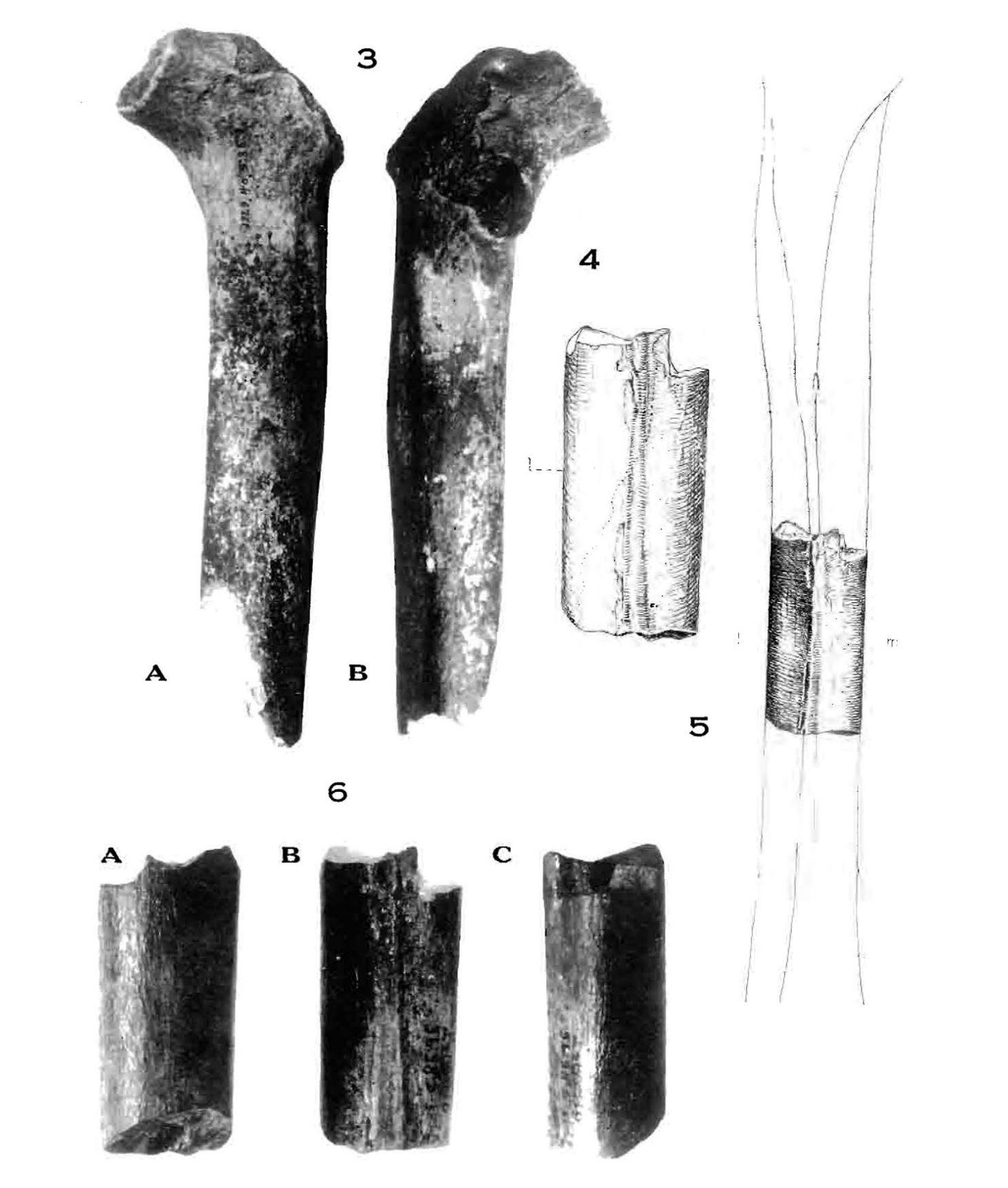
Femora I and II

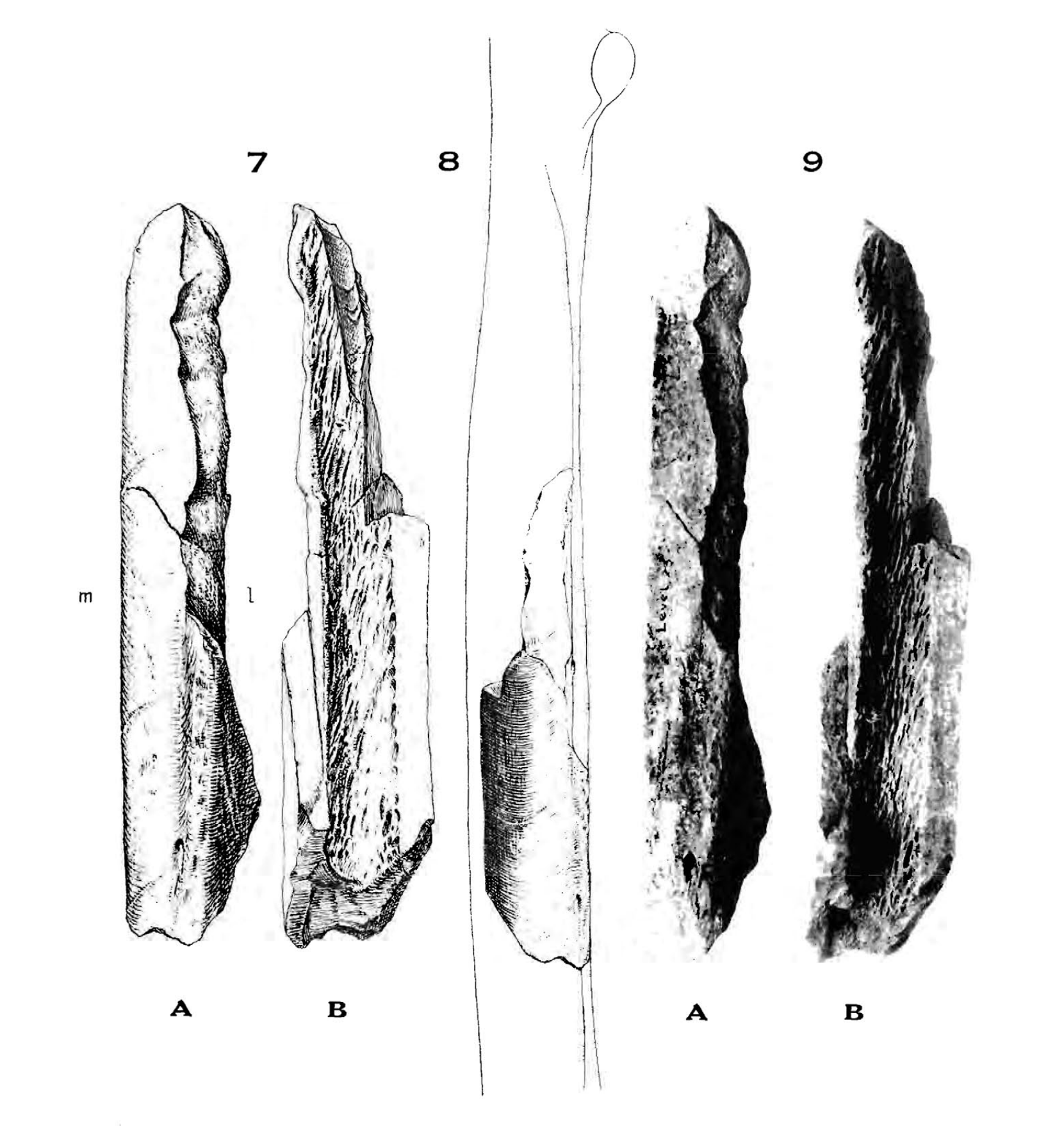
Femur III

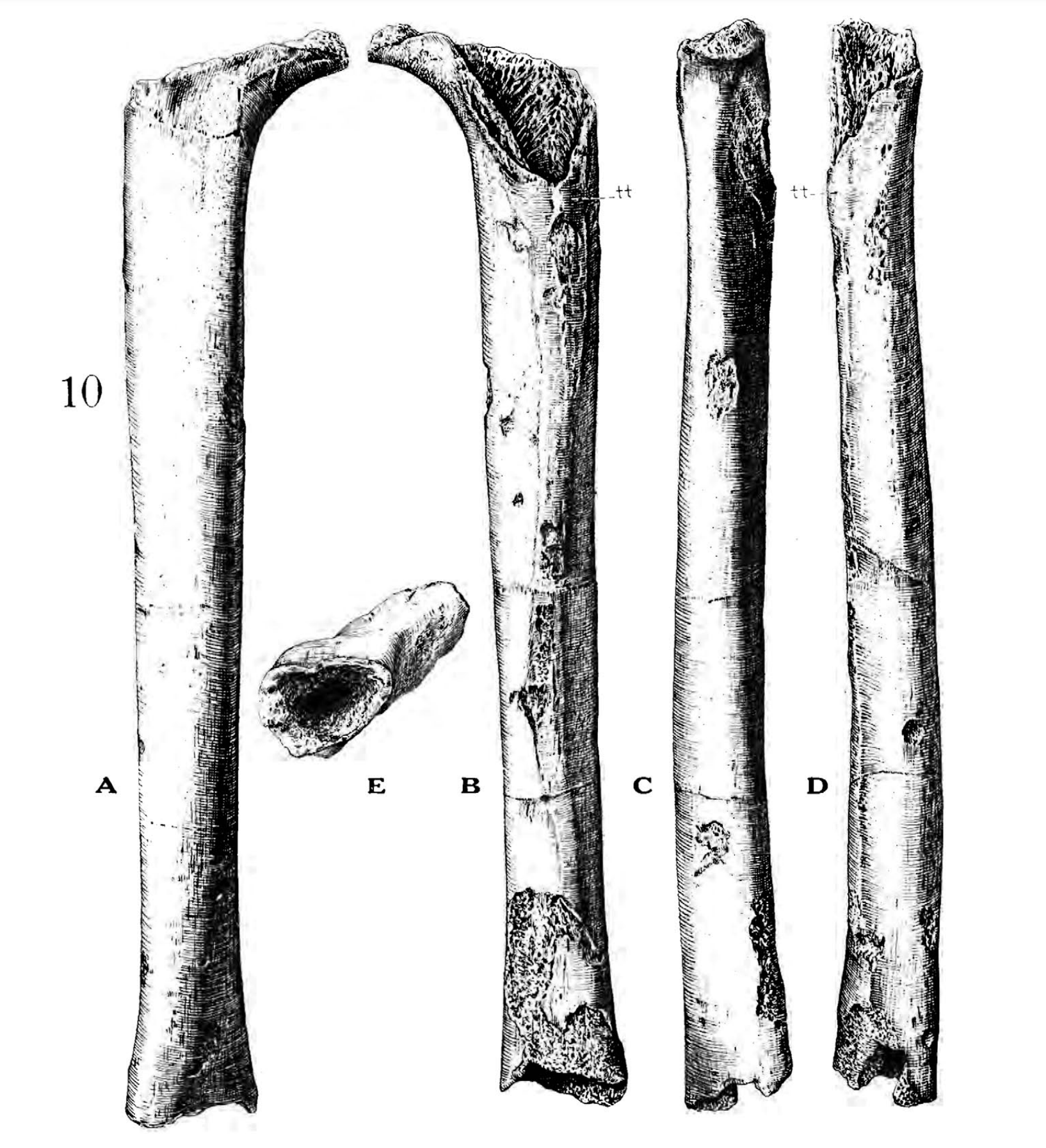
Femur IV

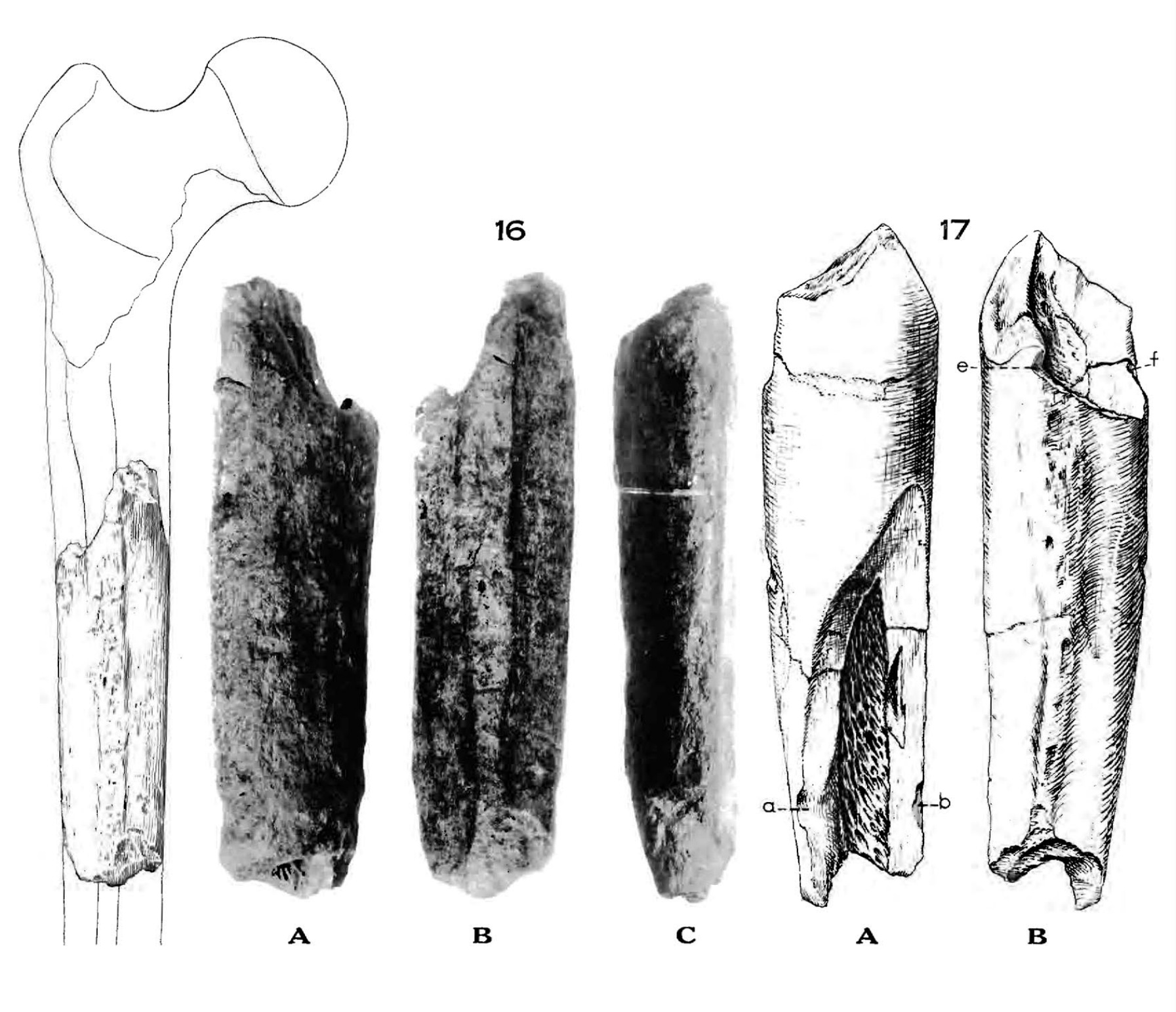
Femora V and VI

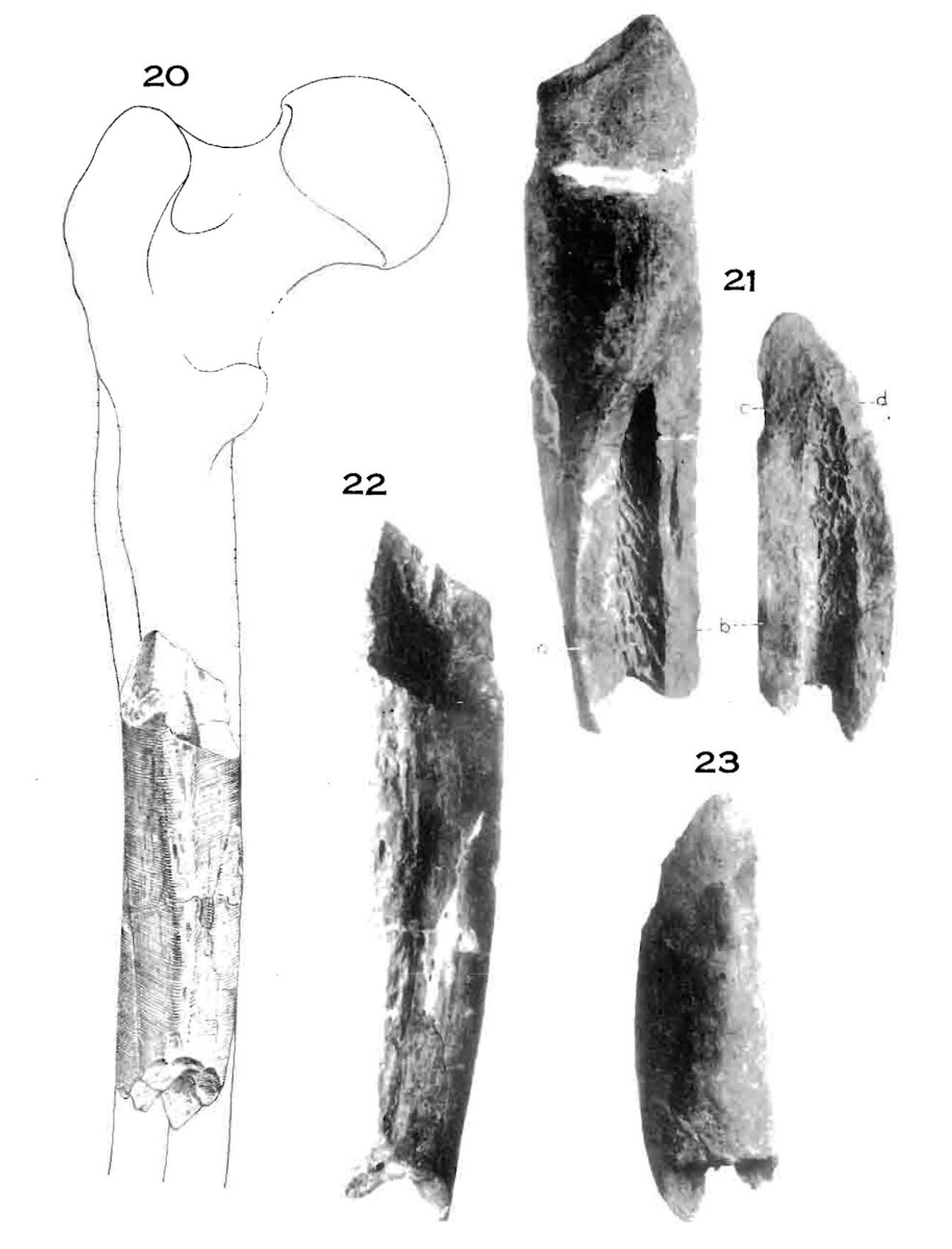
Femur VI

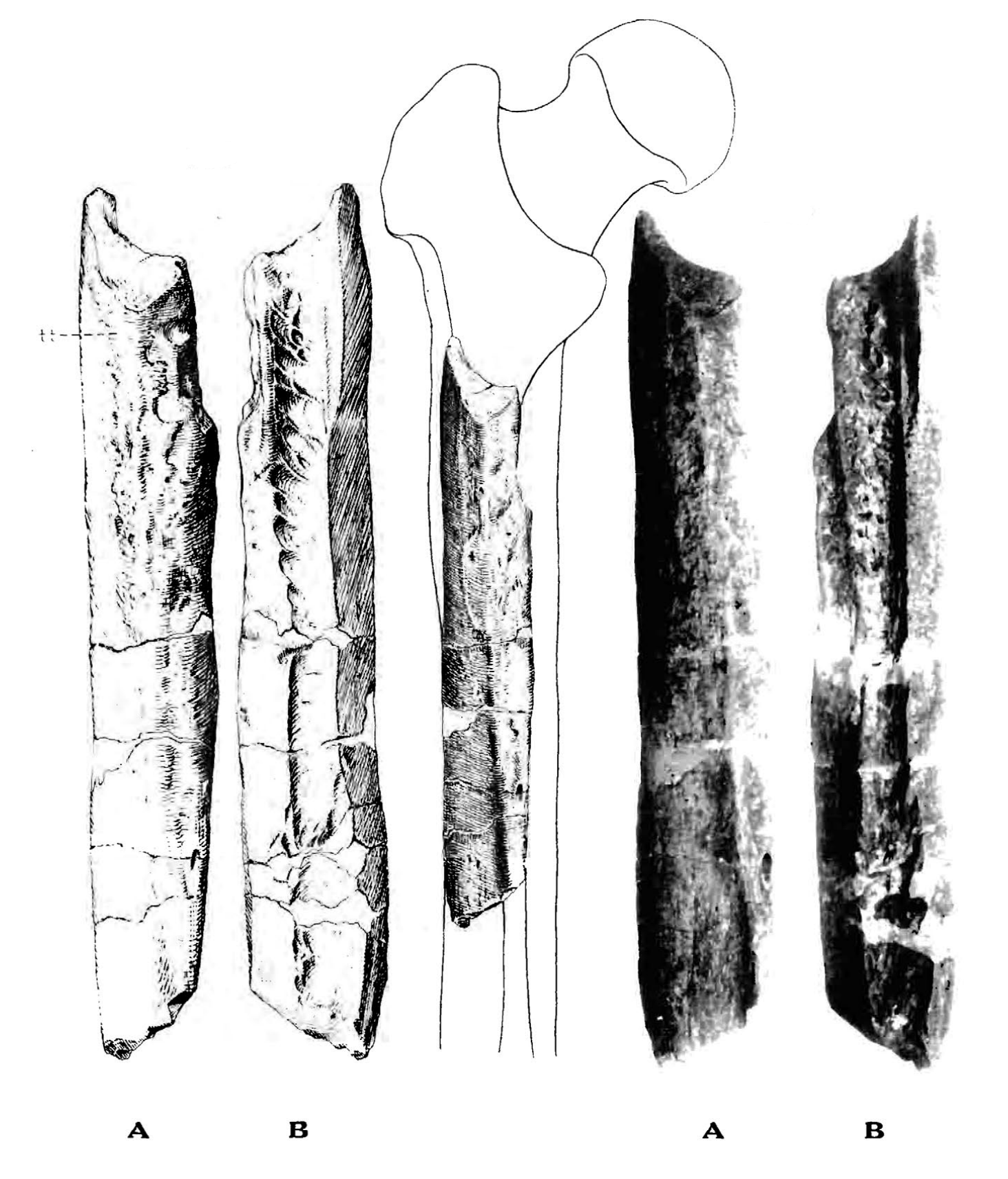
Femur VII

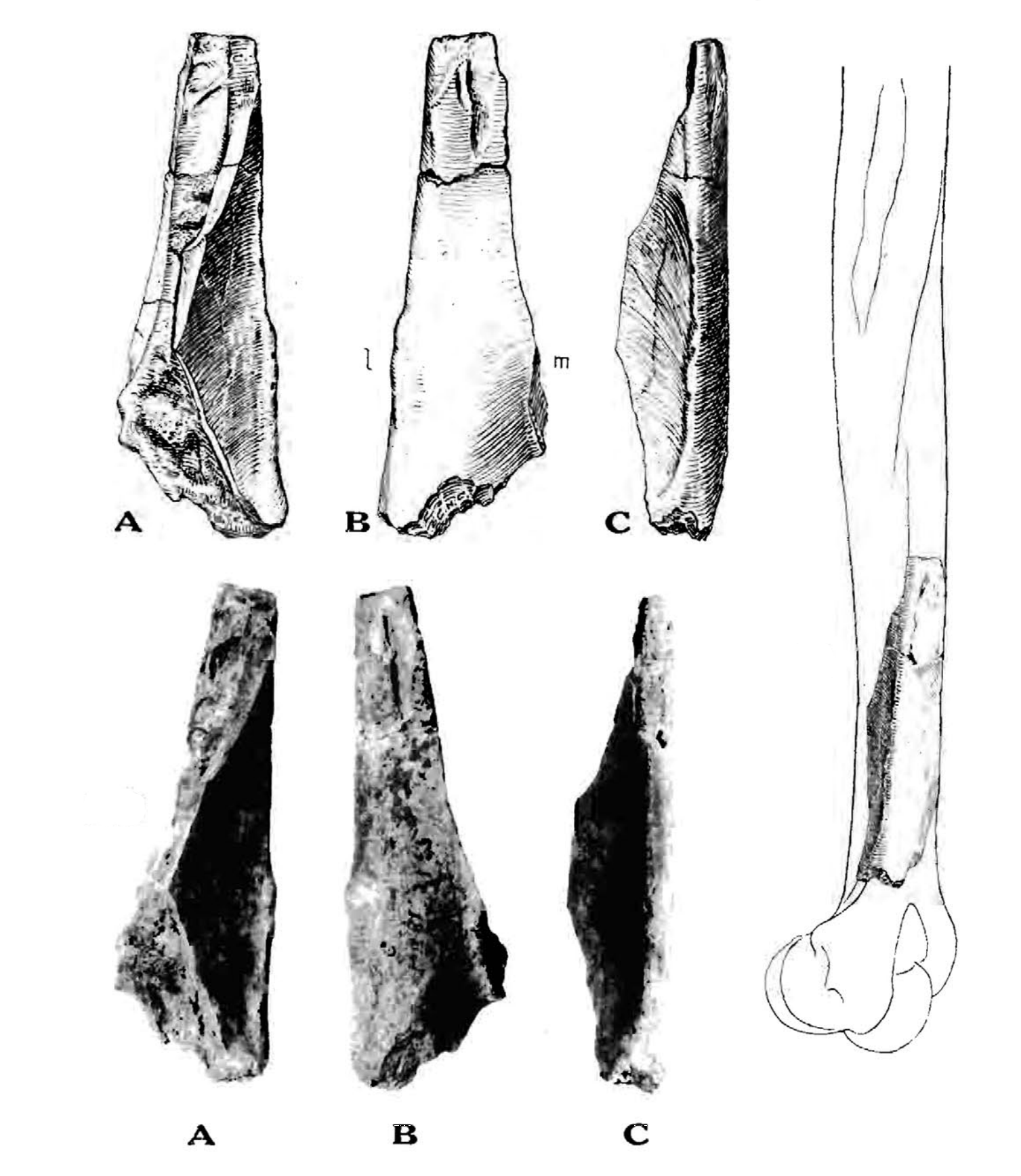
Humerus I

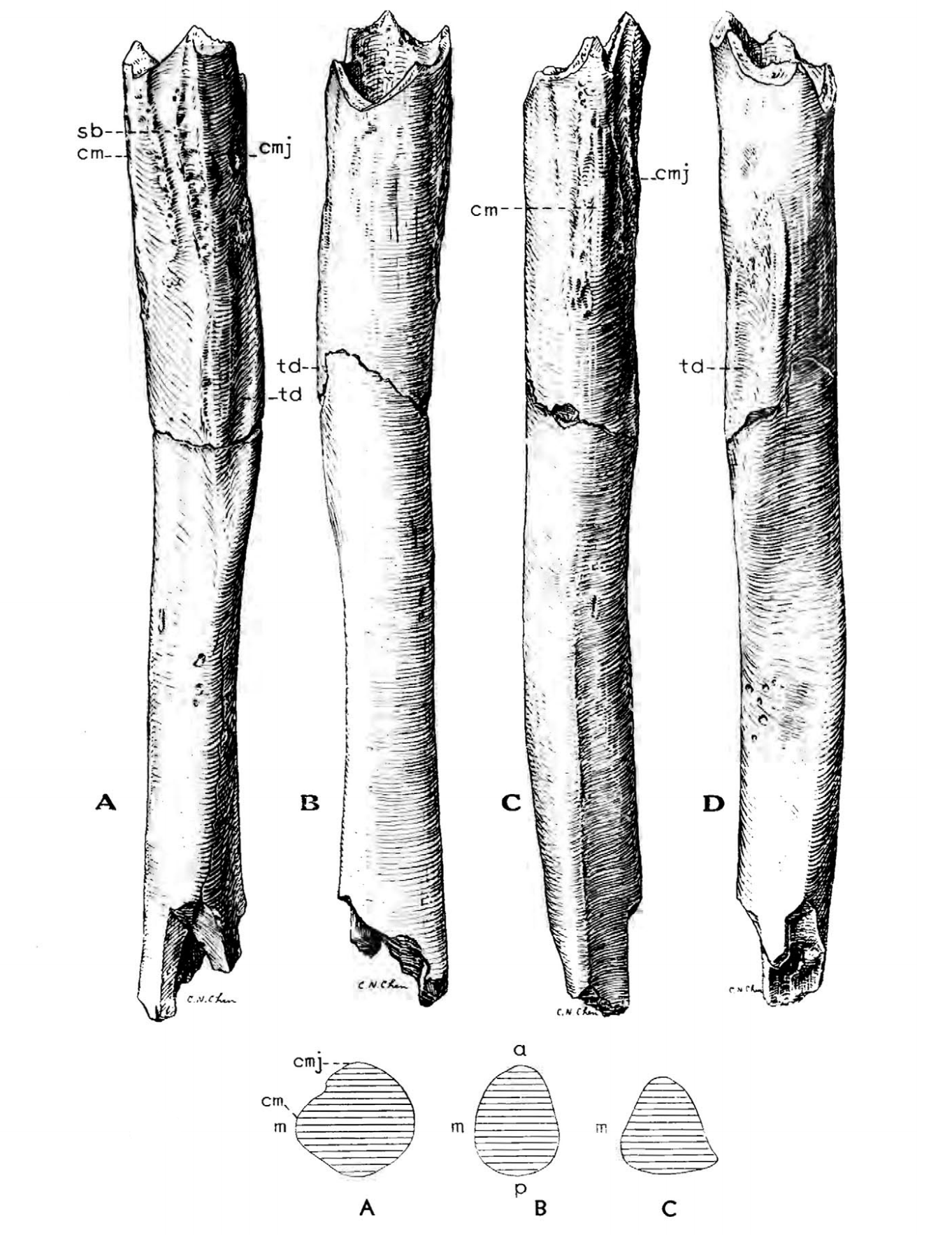
Humerus II

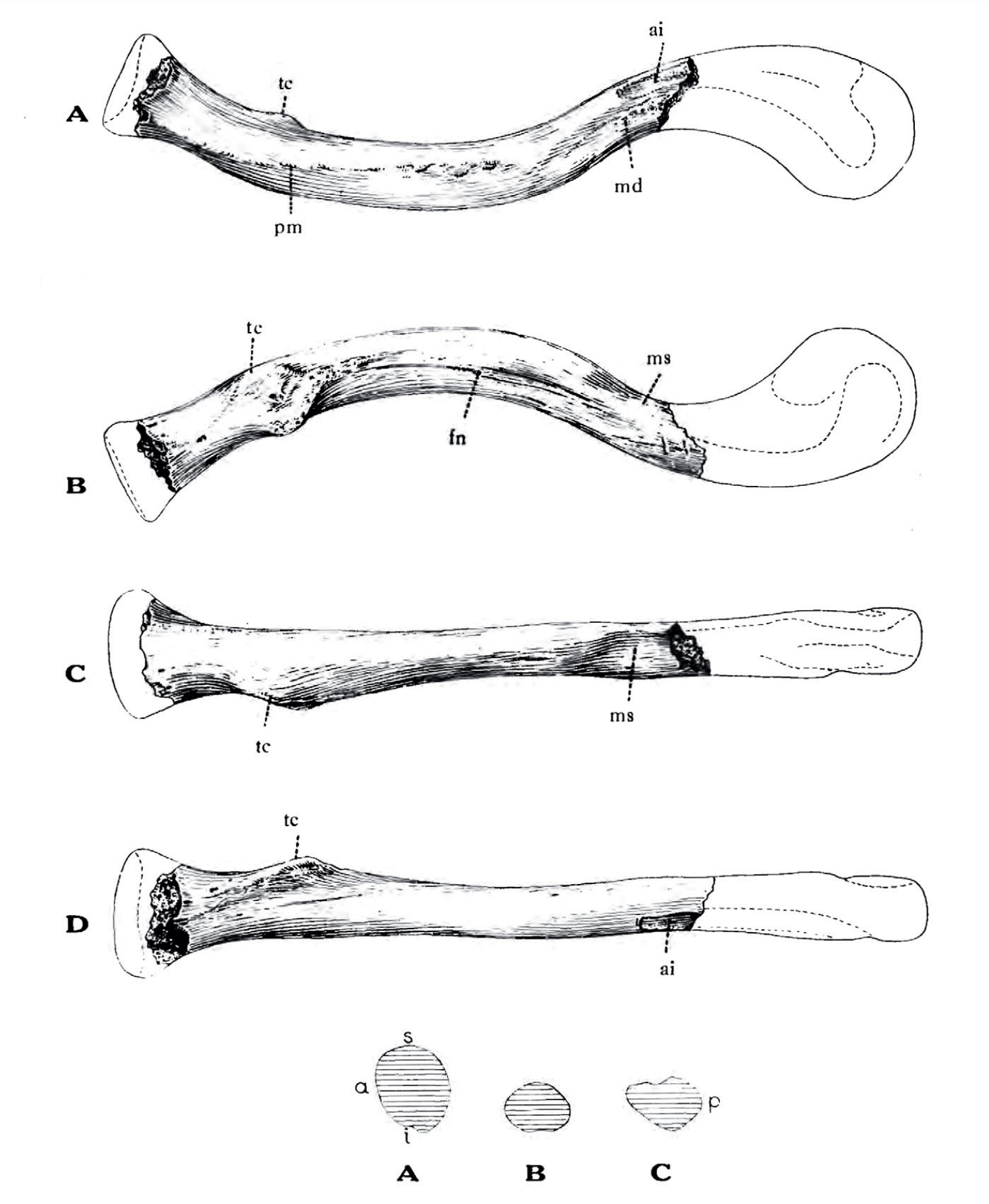
Clavicle I

== Culture ==
=== Palaeoenvironment ===
The mammal assemblage of the Zhoukoudian site indicates three major environmental units: Layers 11–10—a cold and dry, grassland environment; Layers 9–5—a warm, forested environment; and Layers 4–1—another cold and dry, grassland environment.

The mammal assemblage includes macaques, the Zhoukoudian wolf, the Asian black bear, the brown bear, the rhino Dicerorhinus choukoutienensis, the woolly rhinoceros, the horse Equus sanmeniensis, the Siberian musk deer, the giant deer Sinomegaceros pachyosteus, sheep, bison, the Asian straight-tusked elephant, bats, pika, rodents, and shrews. The mammal assemblage of Layers 4–3 is broadly similar to that of Layers 9–8, in addition to several warm-to-mild climate steppe and forest creatures, including the raccoon dog Nyctereutes sinensis, the dhole Cuon antiquus, the corsac fox, the Asian badger, wolverines, the giant hyena Pachycrocuta, the saber-toothed cat Megantereon inexpectatus, the tiger, the leopard, sika deer, the antelope Spirocerus peii, and the water buffalo Bubalus teilhardi. The Zhoukoudian fauna are not entirely exclusive to either glacial or interglacial periods.

H. erectus seems to have typically favoured open environments. It is debated if Peking Man occupied the region during colder glacial periods or only took residence during warmer interglacials, tied to the uncertain chronology of Zhoukoudian, as well as arguments regarding fire usage, clothing technology, and hunting ability. Given the abundance of deer remains, it was early on assumed Peking Man was a prolific deer hunter, but since the establishment of non-human carnivores as major taphonomic agents, the dependence on hunting has become a controversial topic. Most of the Peking Man fossils were likely fed upon by hyenas. Nonetheless, some of the animal fossils seem to have been modified by humans. In 1986, the American archaeologist Lewis Binford and colleagues reported a few horse fossils with cutmarks left by stone tools, and two upper premolars from Layer 4 appearing to him to have been burned while still fresh, which he ascribed to horse-head roasting. Binford believed that Peking Man was simply scavenging from hyenas because all of the tool cuts he analysed were always overlapping hyena gnaw marks, instead of vice versa. Zhoukoudian also preserves the remains of edible plants, nuts, and seeds that Peking Man may have eaten: Chinese hackberry, walnut, hazelnut, pine, elm, and rambler rose.

H. erectus, a specialist in woodland and savannah biomes, likely went extinct with the takeover of tropical rainforests. From marine isotope stages 12 to 10 (roughly 340,000 to 500,000 years ago), the Chinese archaeological record becomes dominated by "late-archaic" non-erectus fossils, potentially representing multiple species including the Denisovans, H. longi, and H. juluensis. Peking Man's final stay at Zhoukoudian may have taken place between 230,000 and 400,000 years ago, with a more precise interval being difficult to arrive at.

=== Occupation of the cave ===
Because human remains (encompassing males, females, and children), tools, and potential evidence of fire were found in so many layers, it has often been assumed Peking Man lived in the Zhoukoudian cave site for hundreds of thousands of years.

In 1929, the French archaeologist Henri Breuil suggested the overabundance of skulls compared to body remains is conspicuous, and hypothesised the remains represent the trophies of cannibalistic headhunters, either a band of H. erectus or a more "advanced" species of human. In 1937, the French palaeoanthropologist Marcellin Boule believed the Peking Man brain was insufficiently evolved for such behaviour, based on the brain size, and suggested the skulls belonged to a primitive species and the limbs to a more evolved one, the latter manufacturing stone tools and cannibalising the former. Weidenreich did not believe brain size could be a measure of cultural complexity, but, in 1939, he detailed the pathology of the Peking Man fossils and came to the conclusion of cannibalism or headhunting. The majority of the remains bear evidence of scars or injuries which he ascribed to attacks from clubs or stone tools; all the skulls have broken-in bases which he believed was done to extract the brain; and the femora have lengthwise splits, which he supposed was done to harvest the bone marrow.

Weidenreich's sentiments became widely popular. Another school of thought, proposed by Pei in 1929, held that individuals were dragged in by hyenas. In 1939, pioneering the field of taphonomy (the study of fossilisation), the German palaeontologist Helmuth Zapfe highlighted parallels between the Zhoukoudian fossils and cow bones gnawed by hyenas he studied at the Vienna Zoo. Weidenreich subsequently conceded in 1941 that the breaking-off of the epiphyses of long bones is most likely due to hyena activity, but he was unconvinced that hyenas broke open the skull base or were capable of creating the long splits in the robust femora, still ascribing those to stone-tool-wielding cannibals. (Note: Headhunting had subsequently been proposed for all major Indonesian H. erectus sites (Trinil, Sangiran, Modjokerto, and Ngandong) which also featured several skullcaps missing the base, as well as few body fossils. In 1972, Indonesian palaeoanthropologist Teuku Jacob suggested it was because the base is naturally weaker and should be expected to break off, and the rest of the body is meatier than the skull and is preferentially destroyed by carnivores (namely tigers).) In addition to carnivore damage, Skull V bears a lesion on the right brow consistent with non-fatal blunt force trauma, which could have been caused by a human attack, or some accidental bump or fall.

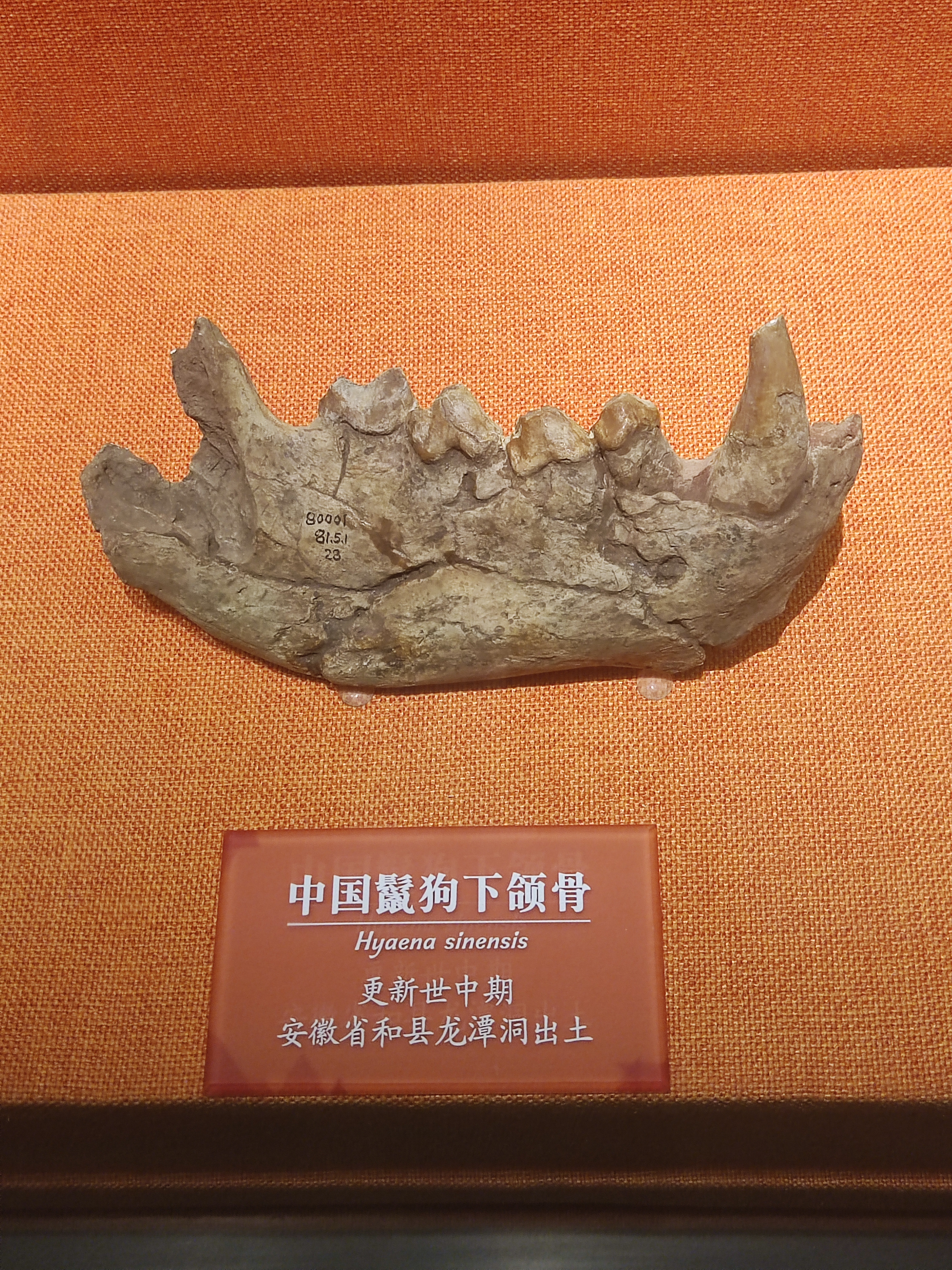
Pachycrocuta (jaw above) may be responsible for depositing the Peking Man fossils in Zhoukoudian.

By the mid-20th century, the hypothesis that Peking Man inhabited the cave once again became the mainstay, modeled around Jia's 1975 book The Cave Home of Peking Man. In 1985, Binford and the Chinese palaeoanthropologist Ho Chuan Kun instead hypothesised that Zhoukoudian was a "trap" which humans and animals fell into. They further proposed that deer remains, earlier assumed to have been Peking Man's prey, were instead predominantly carried in by the giant hyena Pachycrocuta, and that ash was deposited by naturally occurring wildfires fueled by bat guano, as they did not believe any human species had yet mastered hunting or fire at this time. Evidence of fire usage would indicate occupation of the cave. (Note: Binford et al. is referring to the then-recent supposition by American palaeoanthropologist Milford H. Wolpoff, who challenged the formerly popular notion that major brain expansion was a result of hunting in combination with the domestication of fire and invention of cooking.)

In 2000, Boaz and colleagues argued that the state of the bones is consistent with general hyena biting, gnawing, and bone-crunching. They suggested that Pachycrocuta—the largest known hyena to have ever lived—was more than capable of splitting robust bones, contrary to Weidenreich. They identified bite marks on 67% of the Peking Man fossils (28 specimens), and attributed this and all other perimortem (around the time of death) damage to hyenas. Boaz and colleagues conceded that stone tools must indicate human activity in (or at least near) the cave, but, with few exceptions, tools were randomly scattered across the layers (as mentioned by several previous scientists). American geologist Paul Goldberg and colleagues ascribed this to bioturbation. This means that the distribution of the tools gives no indication of the duration of human habitation. In 2016, Shuangquan Zhang and colleagues were unable to detect significant evidence of animal, human, or water damage to the few deer bones collected from Layer 3, and concluded they fell into the cave from above. They noted taphonomic debates were still ongoing as of 2016.

=== Society ===
During the Mao era, the dissemination of communist ideology among the general populace of China was imperative. The concept of "labour created humanity"—described by the prominent communist philosopher Friedrich Engels in his 1876 essay "The Part Played by Labour in the Transition from Ape to Man"—became central to Chinese anthropology, and was included in almost any discussion regarding Peking Man and human evolution, including educational media for laypersons. (Note: The Soviet Union was instrumental in the translation of Western works into Chinese, including those related to human evolution.) To the West, emphasis was usually placed on intelligence rather than labour, especially after the English primatologist Jane Goodall discovered that chimpanzees could make tools in 1960 (i.e., the labour of tool manufacturing is not unique to humans).

As for the society of these ancient humans, including Peking Man, Engel's 1884 book The Origin of the Family, Private Property and the State and his concept of primitive communism became popular in academic discussions. Engels had largely based his ideas on the American ethnologist Lewis H. Morgan's 1877 book Ancient Society, which detailed Morgan's studies on "primitive" hunter-gatherer societies, namely the Iroquois. In the Mao era, Peking Man was consequently often painted as leading a dangerous life in the struggle against nature, organised into simple, peaceful tribes which foraged, hunted, and made stone tools in cooperative groups. As for gender roles, Peking Man society was most often described as "men hunt and women gather."

Consistent with other prehistoric human populations, Peking Man had a rather short average lifespan. Out of a sample of 38 individuals, 15 died under the age of 14 years (39.5%), 3 died around 30 years (7%), 3 died from 40 to 50 years (7%), and 1 at 50 to 60 years (2.6%). The ages of the remaining 16 individuals (43%) could not be determined.

=== Stone tools ===
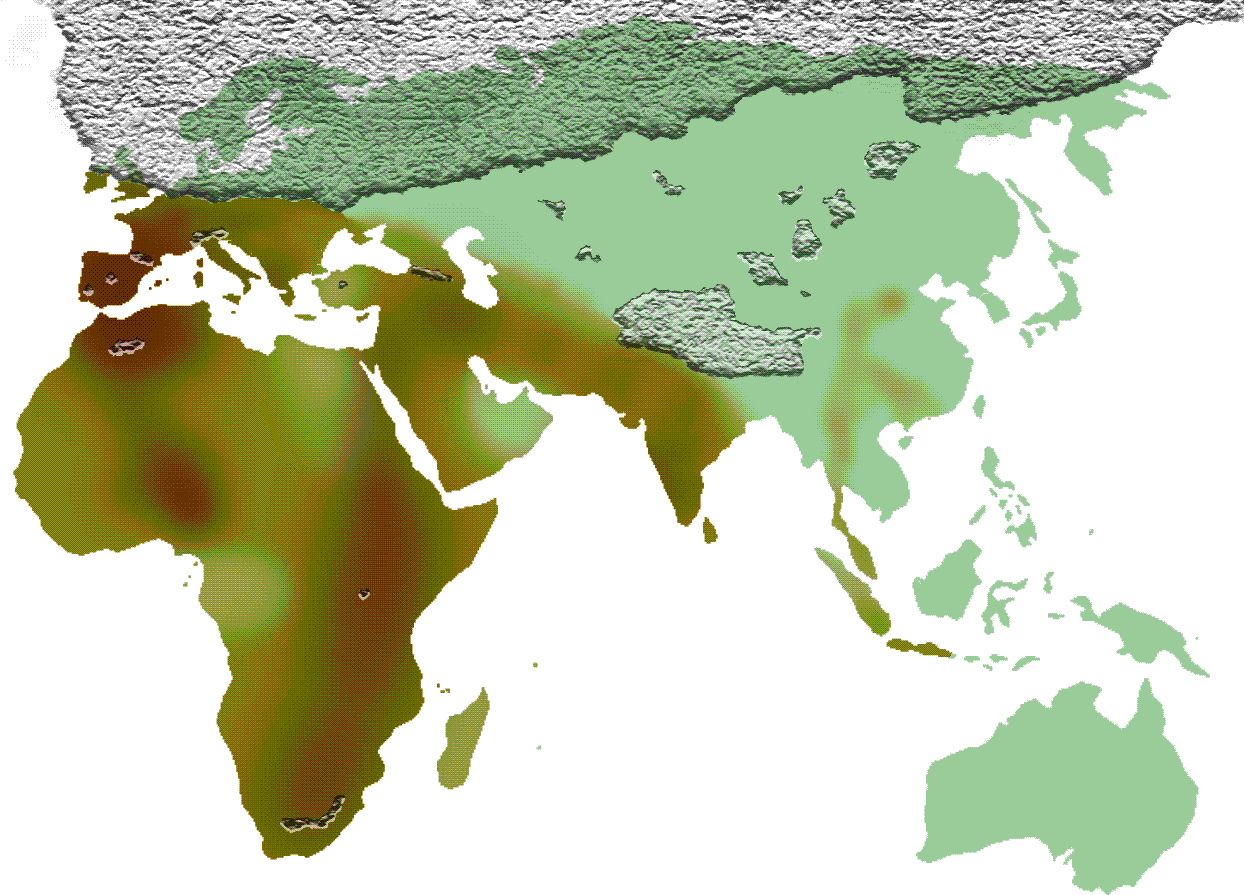
Hand axe technology distribution through the Middle Pleistocene Areas with hand axes Areas without hand axes

Despite Zhoukoudian being one of the most productive sites for East Asian stone tools, from the 1950s to the 1980s the Institute of Vertebrate Paleontology and Paleoanthropology (IVPP) prioritised human and animal fossils. In the rest of the world, especially Europe, tools and manufacturing techniques have been categorised down to regional levels. Consequently, China's Lower Palaeolithic record has generally been viewed as stagnant. Markers of broader periods in the West are conspicuously rare in the East, most notably hand axes characteristic of the Acheulean culture (typically associated with western H. erectus and H. heidelbergensis). The apparent technological divide inspired the American archaeologist Hallam L. Movius to draw the "Movius Line" in 1948, dividing the East (mainly considering Zhoukoudian tools) into a "chopping-tool culture" and the West into a "hand axe culture".

[T]his area cannot be considered in any sense "progressive" from a cultural point of view .... [A]s early as Lower Palaeolithic times Southern and Eastern Asia as a whole was a region of cultural retardation.

— Hallam L. Movius, 1948

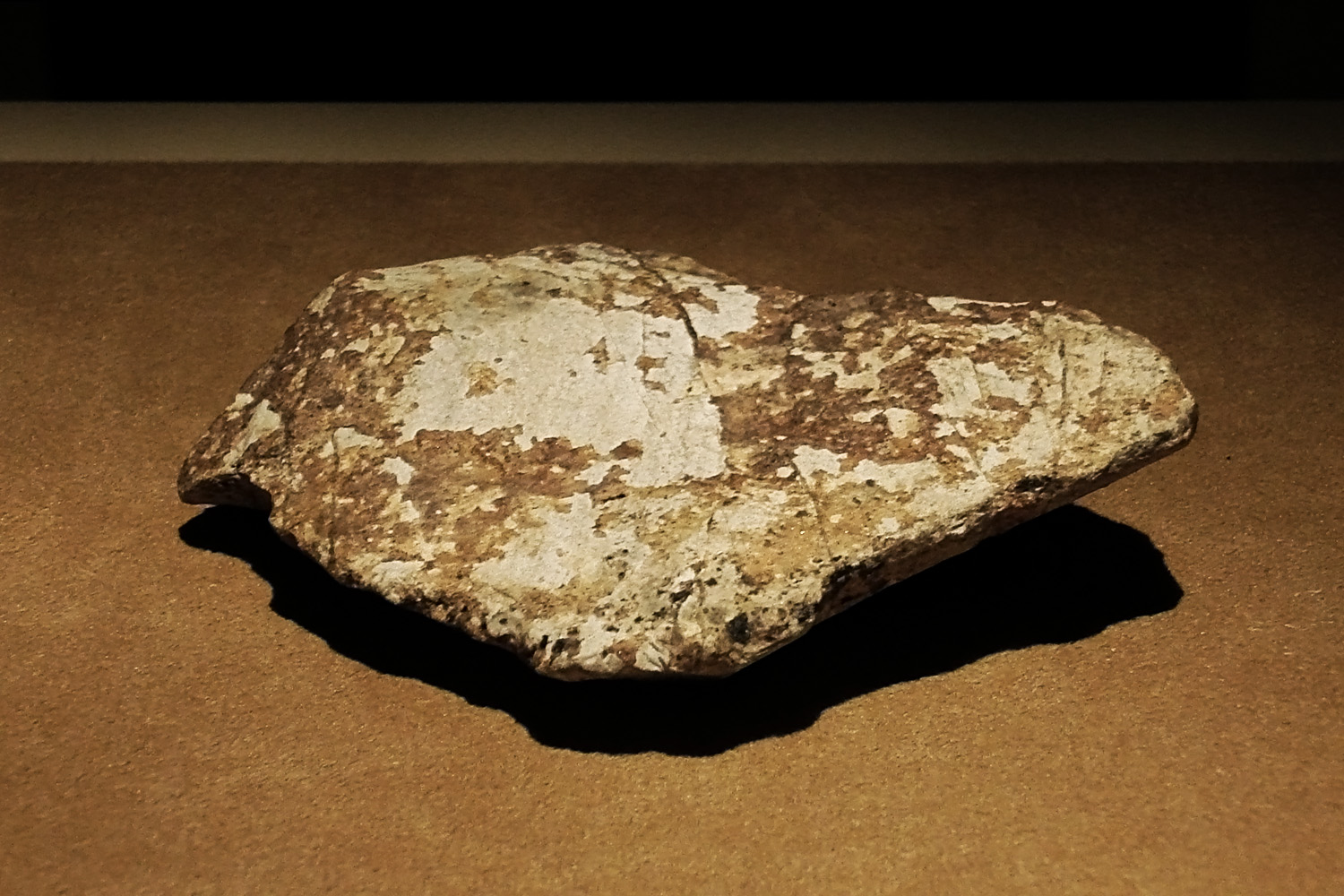
Scraper from the Zhoukoudian Peking Man Site

Locality 1 at Zhoukoudian has produced more than 100,000 lithic pieces. The majority of these pieces appears to be debitage (wastage).

The crudely fractured pieces of stone from Choukoutien would never, in the vast majority of instances, have been recognized as showing traces of artificial work had they been recovered isolated in a geological deposit.

— Grahame Clark, From savagery to civilization, 1946

The tool assemblage is otherwise characterised by mainly large, dull choppers and simple, sharp flakes. Similarly, modified animal fossils at Zhoukoudian usually exhibit battering or cutting. Peking Man also rarely manufactured scrapers and (towards the later end of occupation) retouched tools such as points and potentially burins, as suggested by Breuil, but Pei and Movius believed the alleged burins were too crude to have been produced intentionally. Brueil also postulated that Peking Man predominantly relied on bone tools made of prey animals' antlers, jaws, and isolated teeth, but this idea did not receive wide support. Many of his supposed bone flakes could easily be ascribed to hyena activity.

In 1979, to highlight technological evolution, Pei and Zhang partitioned the Zhoukoudian industry into three stages:

- the early stage typified by the simple hammer and anvil technique (slamming the core against a rock) which produced large flakes namely from soft materials such as sandstone, weighing up to 50 g (1.8 oz) and measuring 60 mm (2.4 in) from Layer 11;
- the middle stage typified by the bipolar technique (smashing the core into several flakes with a hammerstone, out of which at least a few should be the correct size and shape) which made smaller flakes up to 20 g (0.71 oz) in weight and 40 mm (1.6 in) in length;
- the late stage above Layer 5 typified by even smaller flakes made with harder and higher quality quartz and flint among other cobble. Quartz had to be collected some distance from the cave, at local granite outcrops by the hills and riverbed.

These techniques produced unstandardised tools, and Binford was skeptical of any evidence of cultural evolution at all.

In the early 1960s, between the Great Leap Forward and the Cultural Revolution, there was a debate over whether Peking Man was the first human species to manufacture tools. The argument centred around whether Zhoukoudian tools were the most primitive and therefore the earliest tools (i.e., Peking Man is the most ancient human) championed by Pei, or if there were even more primitive and as of yet undiscovered tools (i.e., Peking Man is not the most ancient human) championed by Jia. In Western circles, Leakey had already reported an apparent pebble industry in Olduvai Gorge, Tanzania, in 1931, the first hard (albeit, controversial) evidence of a culture more primitive than the Acheulean. Radiometric dating in the 1960s established the Oldowan as the oldest known culture, at 1.8 million years old. (Note: Oldowan tools dating to 2.6 million years ago were reported in 2003. An ostensible industry dating to 3.3 million years ago, the Lomekwian, was proposed in 2015.)

Productive contemporaneous Chinese stone tool sites include Xiaochangliang (similar to Zhoukoudian), Mount Jigong, Bose Basin (which produced large tools often in excess of 10 cm, or 4 in), Jinniushan, Dingcun, and Panxian Dadong.

=== Fire ===
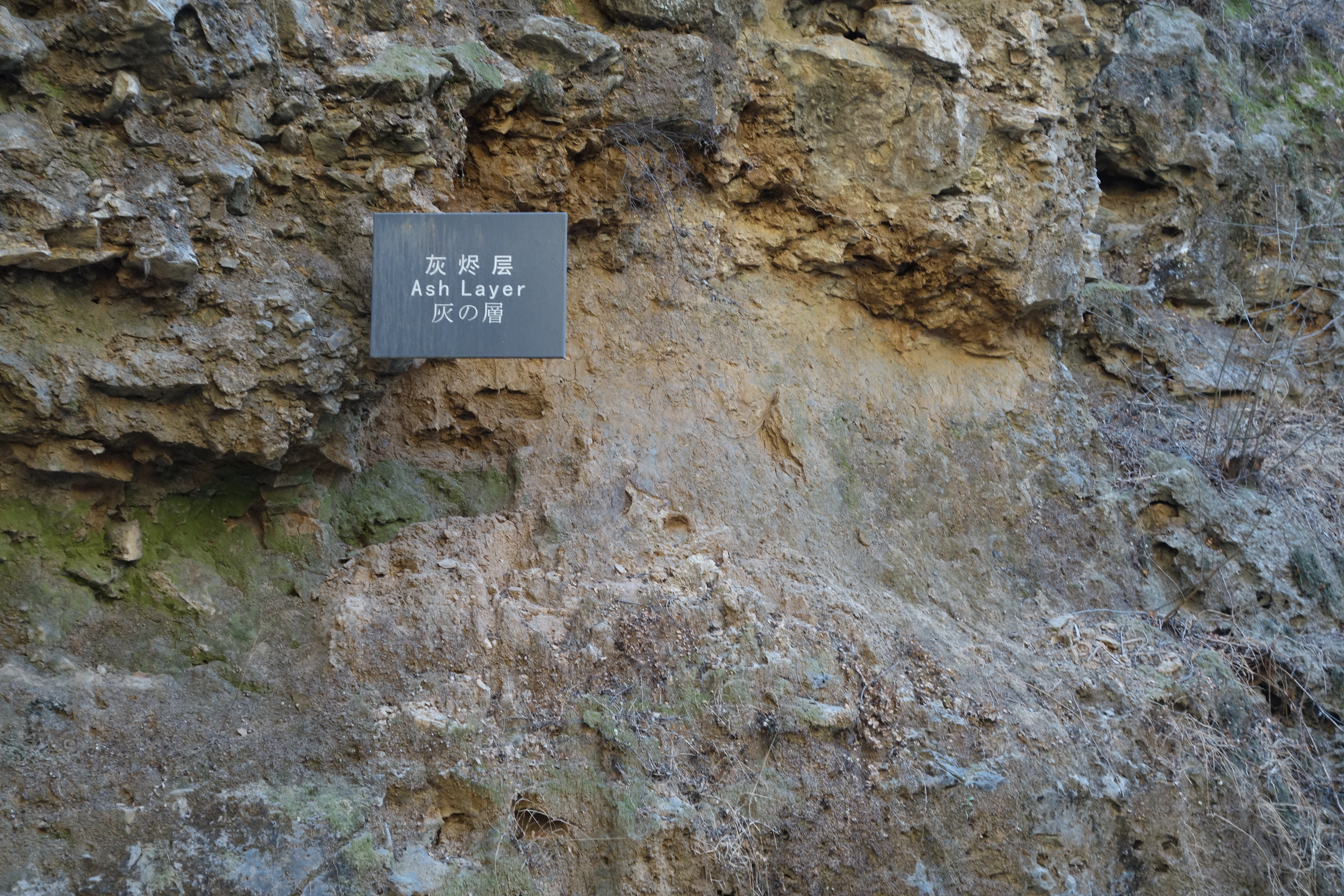
Possible ash layer at Zhoukoudian

In 1929, Pei oversaw the excavation of Quartz Horizon 2 (Layer 7, Locus G) of Zhoukoudian, and reported burned bones and stones, ash, and redbud charcoal, which was interpreted as evidence of early fire usage by Peking Man. The evidence was widely accepted. Further excavation in 1935 of Layers 4–5 revealed more burned stones, ash, and hackberry seeds. Ash was deposited in horizontal and vertical patches, reminiscent of hearths.

In 1985, Binford and Ho doubted Peking Man actually inhabited Zhoukoudian, and asserted the material was burned by naturally occurring fires fuelled by guano. In 1986, Binford interpreted burned horse teeth as evidence of horse-head roasting. In 1998, Weiner, Goldberg, and colleagues found no evidence of hearths or siliceous aggregates (silicon particles, which form during combustion) in Layers 1 or 10; they therefore concluded the burned material was simply washed into the cave rather than being burned in the cave. The IVPP immediately responded, and, in 1999, Wu Xinzhi argued that Weiner's data was too limited to reach such conclusions. In 2001, Goldberg, Weiner, and colleagues concluded the ash layers are reworked loessic silts, and that blackened carbon-rich sediments that have been traditionally interpreted as charcoal are instead deposits of organic matter left to decompose in standing water. That is, there is no evidence of ash or fire at all.

In 2004, Shen and colleagues reported evidence of a massive fire at Layer 10—ostensibly as old as 770,000 years ago, during a glacial period—and asserted Peking Man needed to control fire so far back in time in order to survive such cold conditions. In 2014, the Chinese anthropologist Zhong Maohua and colleagues reported elements associated with siliceous aggregates in Layers 4 and 6, and they also doubted the validity of Weiner's analysis of Layer 10. Similarly, in 2017, Gao and colleagues reported "clear-cut evidence of fire usage" in Layer 4 with some evidence of man-made hearths which, based on magnetic susceptibility and colour, may have been heated to over 700 °C (1,300 °F). In 2022, Huang and colleagues also determined that at least 15 bones from Layer 4 (based on colour) were heated to above 600 °C (1,100 °F) inside the cave, consistent with a campfire (or a prolonged wildfire, which they considered less likely inside a cave).

Elsewhere, evidence of fire usage is scarce in the archaeological record until 300,000 to 400,000 years ago, which is generally interpreted as fire not being an integral part of life until this time, either because they could not create or well-maintain it.

== See also ==
- Gigantopithecus
- Homo longi
- Peopling of China
- Prehistory of China
- Solo Man

== Sources ==
- Aczel, A. D. (2007). The Jesuit and the Skull: Teilhard de Chardin, Evolution, and the Search for Peking Man. Riverhead Books. ISBN 978-1-59448-956-3.
- Boaz, N. T.; Ciochon, R. (2004). Dragon Bone Hill: An Ice-Age Saga of Homo erectus. Oxford University Press. ISBN 978-0-19-803488-9.
- Frängsmyr, Tore (2012). "Peking Man: New Light on an Old Discovery". In Buchwald, Jed Z. (ed.). A Master of Science History: Essays in Honor of Charles Coulston Gillispie. Springer. pp. 49–62. ISBN 978-94-007-2627-7.
- Jia, L.; Huang, W. (1990). The Story of Peking Man: From Archaeology to Mystery. Oxford University Press. ISBN 978-0-19-585188-5.
- Schmalzer, S. (2008). The People's Peking Man: Popular Science and Human Identity in Twentieth-Century China. University of Chicago Press. doi:10.7208/chicago/9780226738611.001.0001. ISBN 978-0-226-73860-4.
- Weidenreich, F. (1943). The Skull of Sinanthropus pekinensis; A Comparative Study on a Primitive Hominid Skull. Geological Survey of China.
- Weidenreich, F. (1941). The Extremity Bones of Sinanthropus pekinensis. Geological survey of China.
