= Zhoukoudian Peking Man Site =

Cave complex and archaeological site in China

UNESCO World Heritage Site
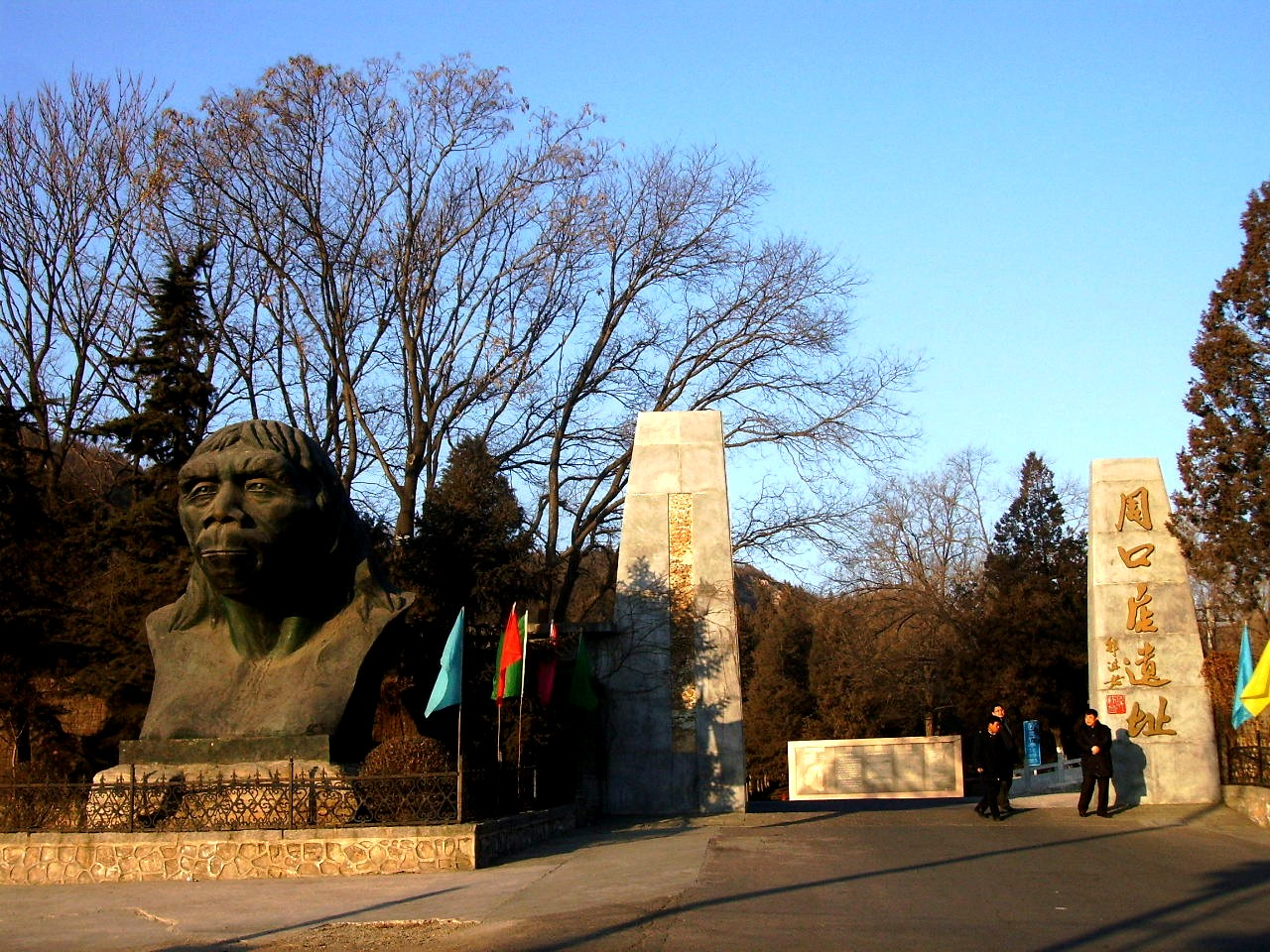
- Zhoukoudian Entrance

- Location within Beijing
- Official name: Peking Man Site at Zhoukoudian
- Location: Zhoukoudian Town, Fangshan District, Beijing, China
- Criteria: Cultural: (iii), (vi)
- Reference: 449
- Inscription: 1987 (11th Session)
- Area: 480 ha (1.9 sq mi)
- Buffer zone: 888 ha (3.43 sq mi)
- Coordinates: 39°41′21″N 115°55′26″E

Chinese name
- Simplified Chinese: 周口店北京人遗址
Transcriptions
Standard Mandarin
- Hanyu Pinyin: Zhōukǒudiàn Běijīngrén Yízhǐ
- Wade–Giles: Chou^{1}-k'ou^{3}-tien^{4} Pei^{3}-ching^{1}-jen^{2} I^{2}-chih^{3}
Yue: Cantonese
- Jyutping: zau^{1} hau^{2} dim^{3} bak^{1} ging^{1} jan^{4} wai^{4} zi^{2}

Zhoukoudian Peking Man Site (周口店北京人遗址), also romanized as Choukoutien, is a cave system in suburban Fangshan District, Beijing. It has yielded many archaeological discoveries, including one of the first specimens of Homo erectus (Homo erectus pekinensis), dubbed Peking Man, and a fine assemblage of bones of the giant short-faced hyena Pachycrocuta brevirostris.

Due to differing interpretations of the evidence, proposed dates for when Peking Man inhabited this site vary greatly, including: 700,000–200,000 years ago, 670,000–470,000 years ago, or no earlier than 530,000 years ago.

The Peking Man Site was first discovered by Johan Gunnar Andersson in 1921, and was first excavated by Otto Zdansky in 1921 and 1923, unearthing two human teeth. These were later identified by Davidson Black as belonging to a previously unknown species, and extensive excavations followed. Fissures in the limestone-containing middle Pleistocene deposits have yielded the remains of about 45 individuals, as well as animal remains, and stone flake and chopping tools.

The oldest animal remains date from as early as 690,000 years ago, with tools as old as 670,000 years ago, while another authority dates the tools found as no earlier than 530,000 years ago. During the Upper Palaeolithic, the site was re-occupied, and remains of Homo sapiens and their stone and bone tools have also been recovered from the Upper Cave.

The crater Choukoutien on asteroid 243 Ida was named after the location. The caves are located in Zhoukoudian Town, Fangshan District, southwest of central Beijing.

== Excavation history ==
=== Discovery ===
Here is primitive man, now all we have to do is find him!

— Johan Gunnar Andersson, upon discovery of the Peking Man Site

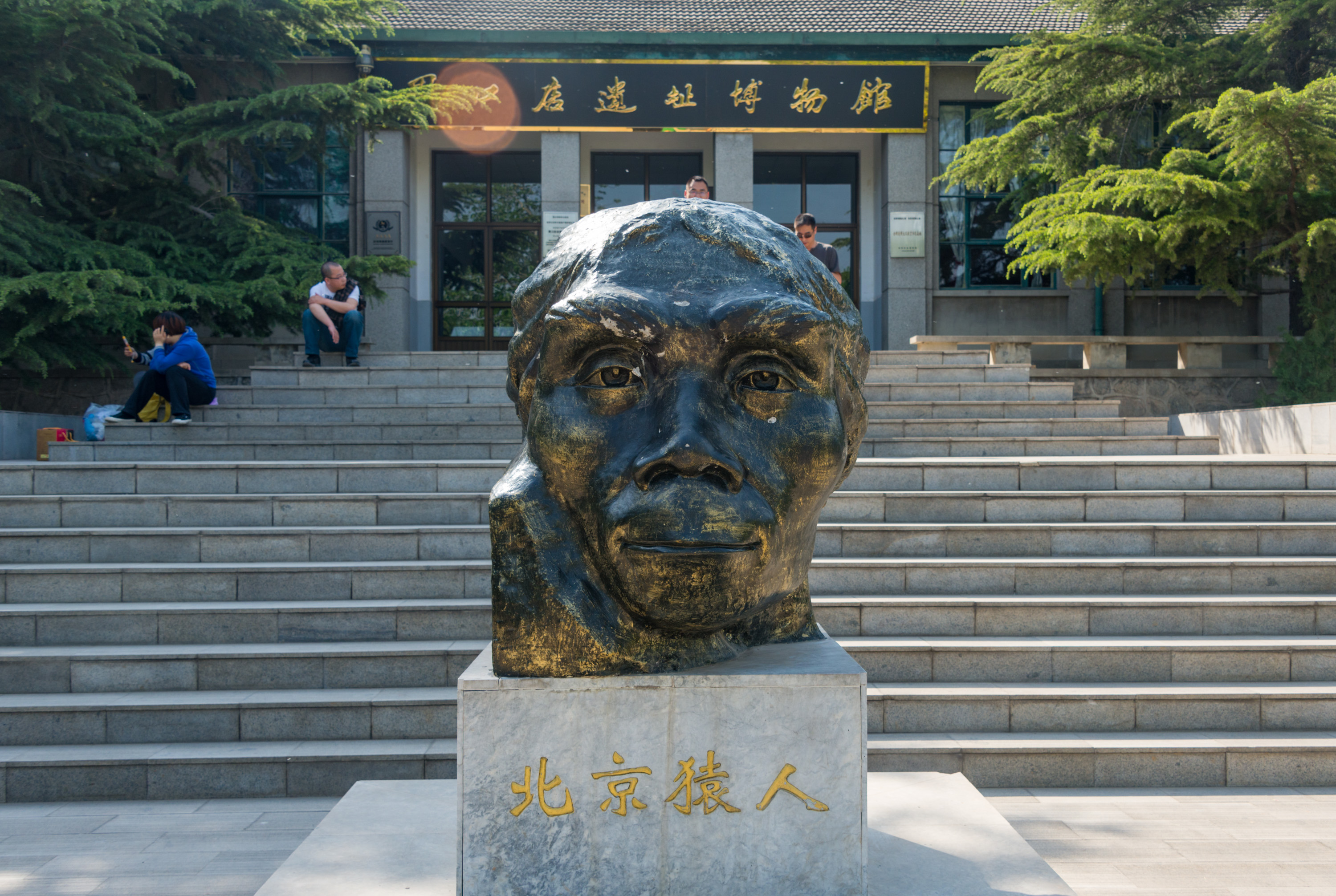
Zhoukoudian Peking Man Site – the Museum. At the centre: bust of reconstructed Peking Man.

Swedish geologist Johan Gunnar Andersson first started his explorations of the region in 1918 at an area called Chicken-bone Hill by locals who had misidentified the rodent fossils that were found in abundance there, but it was not until 1921 that he and American palaeontologist Walter W. Granger were led to the site known as Dragon Bone Hill by local quarry men. Noticing some white quartz that was foreign to the area, he immediately realised that this would be a good place to search for the remains of primitive man.

Excavations were undertaken by Andersson's assistant, Austrian palaeontologist Otto Zdansky in 1921 and 1923, unearthing a great deal of material that was sent back to Uppsala University in Sweden for further analysis. In 1926, Anderson announced the discovery of two human molars amongst this material, and the following year Zdansky published his finding, cautiously identifying the teeth as ?Homo sp.

Sometimes called the Zhoukidian wolf, Canis variabilis fossils were found at the Zhoukoudian cave system and archaeological site in 1934, and named by their discoverer, Pei Wenzhong:

Although no sharp line can be traced between the above described Canis and a true C. lupus, the marked differences found in size, and in cranial characters, seem to be sufficient for creating, at least, a new variety, Canis lupus variabilis, for the Zhoukoudian Locality 1 small wolf.

=== Zhoukoudian Project ===
Canadian paleoanthropologist Davidson Black, who was working for the Peking Union Medical College at the time, was excited by Andersson and Zdansky's find, and applied to the Rockefeller Foundation for funding to undertake a systematic excavation of the site. Funding was granted, and the Zhoukoudian Project commenced excavations in 1927 under the supervision of Chinese archaeologist Li Jie.

That fall, a tooth was unearthed by Swedish paleontologist Anders Birger Bohlin, which Black proposed belonged to a new species dubbed Sinanthropus pekinensis. The following year, Black's excavations uncovered more fossils of his new species, including teeth, a substantial part of a juvenile's jaw, and an adult jaw complete with three teeth. These finds allowed Black to secure an additional $80,000 grant from the Foundation, which he used to establish a research laboratory.

=== Cenozoic Research Laboratory ===
The Cenozoic Research Laboratory of the Geological Survey of China was established at the Peking Union Medical College in 1928 with the assistance of Chinese geologists Ding Wenjiang and Weng Wenhao, for the research and appraisal of the fossils unearthed. Black stayed on at the Laboratory as honorary director, while excavations continued at the site under Chinese paleontologist Yang Zhongjian, anthropologists Pei Wenzhong, and Jia Lanpo.

Conditions at the site were primitive, with scientists having to ride out to the excavation on mules and staying at caravansaries along the way. When the first skullcap was unearthed at the site in 1929, it was done by Pei, working in a 40-meter crevasse in frigid weather, with a hammer in one hand and a candle in the other. A second skullcap was discovered close to the first in 1930, and by 1932 nearly 100 workers were deployed at the site each day.

Despite the conditions at the site, eminent researchers continued to visit. French palaeontologist Pierre Teilhard de Chardin had been a regular visitor to the site since 1926. French archaeologist Henri Breuil visited in 1931 and confirmed the presence of stone tools. That same year, evidence of the use of fire at the cave was accepted.

The ever-industrious Black died one night at his office in 1934, with one of the skullcaps unearthed at the site on his desk. German Jewish anthropologist Franz Weidenreich replaced him as honorary director of the Laboratory, and excavations continued, uncovering a further three skullcaps in 1936.

Altogether, excavations uncovered 200 human fossils from more than 40 individuals, including 5 nearly complete skullcaps, before they were brought to a halt in 1937 by the Japanese invasion of China. Reports of Japanese atrocities include the torture and murder of workers at the site, with three bayoneted to death, and a fourth forced to pull a rickshaw until dying of starvation.

In 1941, the bulk of the finds were lost, never to be recovered, while in transport to safety. Fortunately, Weidenreich had made copies of the fossils to preserve their physical characteristics.

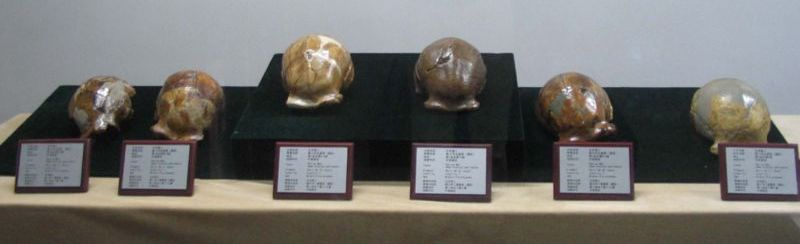
Reconstructions of the Peking Man skulls unearthed

=== Postwar excavations ===
Excavation work was recommenced in 1949, unearthing new Peking Man fossils, including 5 teeth and fragments of thigh and shin bone. The following year, a third premolar was discovered in the material sent back to Uppsala by Zdansky in 1921 and 1923.

The Peking Man Site was designated "Type section of cave deposits of Middle Pleistocene in North China" by the Annual Congress of the National Committee of Stratigraphy of China in 1959, and a mandible fragment was unearthed.

Excavations led by Pei in 1966 unearthed a premolar and two pieces of skull fragment – these were discovered to match fragments retained from previous excavations in 1934 and 1936, and the only extant example of a nearly complete skullcap was pieced together.

Excavations at Locality 4 in Zhoukoudian, from 1972–73, unearthed a Homo sapiens premolar.

Modern scientific dating techniques confirm that the site was occupied between 230,000 and 500,000 years ago.

== Excavation sites ==
=== Peking Man Site ===
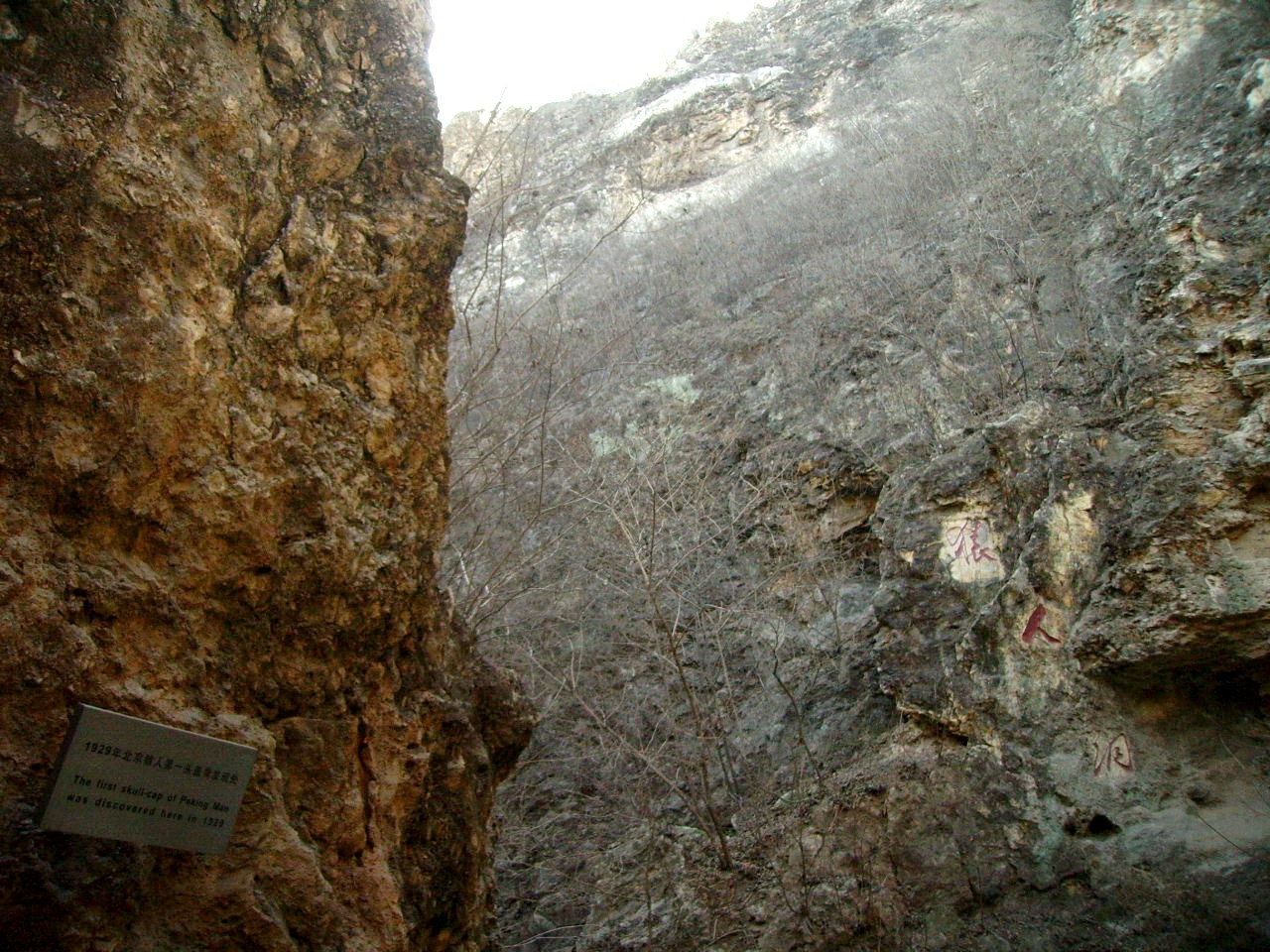
Peking Man Site

Locality 1, also known as Peking Man Site, was the first to be discovered, in 1921, under the direction of local quarry men. The site was originally a natural limestone cave, although the roof had long since collapsed, spreading a layer of breccia and rubble across the top of the deposits. Early excavations in 1921 and 1923 revealed evidence of human habitation from 200,000 to 500,000 years ago. The cave was excavated from 1927–37, yielding 200 human fossils (from 40 individuals) identified as Homo erectus, more than 10,000 lithic pieces, several cinder layers indicating fire use in early man, as well as animal fossils from 200 separate species. The bulk of this material was lost in 1941 during the Japanese occupation and has never been recovered. Excavations recommenced in 1949 and continued to yield fossils and artefacts, making this site one of the most fruitful sources of material from the Middle Pleistocene era.

A total of 13 layers have been excavated at the site to a depth of nearly 40 m.

Layer	Thick	Consistency	Finds
1–2	4m	Breccia & travertine	Fossils & lithic material
3	3m	Course breccia & limestone blocks formed by the roof collapse	Peking Man skull (1966), fossils, & lithics
4	6m	Ash & limestone blocks	Upper Cultural Zone of burned bone & stone, fossils, & lithics
5	1m	Ragstone	Fossils & lithics
6	5m	Breccia, limestone blocks, & Hyena dung	Fossils & lithics
7	2m	Sand	Fossils & lithics
8-9	6m	Breccia & ash	Lower Cultural Zone containing majority of the Peking Man fossils recovered
10	2m	Laterite and ash	Fossils & lithics
11	2m	Breccia	First Peking Man skull (1929), fossils, & lithics
12	2m	Red sand	Fossils
13	2m	Silt & Hyena dung	Fossils & lithics

Layers below this have been shown by test-pit excavation not to contain fossils or lithics and have never been excavated.

==== East Slope ====
Part of the Peking Man Site, this slope was excavated 1930–58 and again in 1978–79 in a multi-disciplinary research mission. Excavations have dug to a depth of 7m through Layers 3–6, and have unearthed stone tools, burned bones and ashes, and fossils of bird, reptile, and mammal species.

==== Pigeon Hall ====
Pigeon Hall was named in honour of its frequent avian visitors, and was connected with the Peking Man Site by workmen in 1928. Excavations from 1930 to 1931 unearthed numerous Peking Man bones (including mandible, clavicle, and parietal bones), signs of fire use (including a scorched redbud stick), and stone tools of quartz, and green sandstone.

=== Upper Cave ===
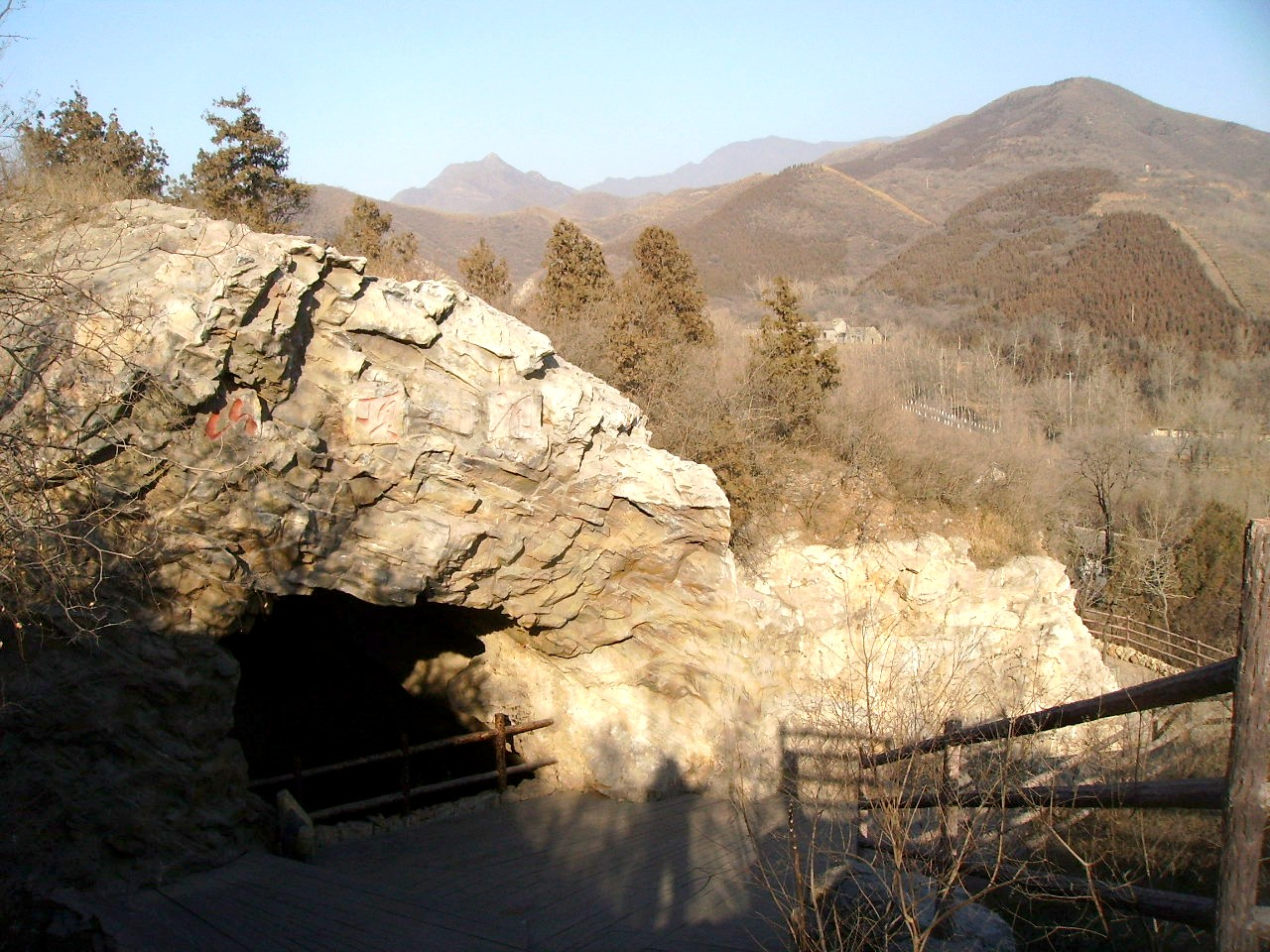
Upper Cave Site

Situated on the upper part of Dragon Bone Hill, this cave was discovered in 1930, and excavated from 1933–34, during which time the roof and north-facing opening were removed. Excavations found evidence of human habitation in the cave dating back to 10,000 to 20,000 years ago. The cave was divided into an upper-level living quarters, and a lower-level burial ground, while a small recess on the lower level acted as a natural animal trap. Finds unearthed included three human skulls, and other remains from at least eight individuals identified as archaic Homo sapiens, tools and ornaments made from stone and bone, and numerous animal bones, including complete skeletons of large mammals caught in the lower-level trap. Also, white powder sprinkled around the remains on the lower level indicated the inhabitants practiced burial rites.

The age for the Upper Cave specimen was revised to an age of 39,000–36,300 years ago, and being affiliated with modern homo sapiens.

=== Other localities ===
More than 20 fossil-bearing localities have been excavated in Zhoukoudian to date.

==== Locality 2 ====
This north–south running fissure is filled with red binder soil, and dates to the Middle Pleistocene era. Excavations in 1921 concurrent with those at the Peking Man Site unearthed mammalian fossils including hamster, rhino, and Chinese hyena.

==== Locality 3 ====
Discovered in 1927, this east–west running fissure is filled with breccia, and dates to the late Middle Pleistocene era. Excavations in 1933 unearthed mammalian fossils including porcupine, raccoon dog, and badger.

==== Locality 4 ====
Discovered in 1927, this north–south running fissure is filled with yellow sandy clay, and dates to the late Middle Pleistocene era. Excavations from 1937–38 unearthed lithics, burned bones and seeds (indicating fire use in early man), and fossils of jackal and deer. A second excavation in 1973 unearthed a human premolar, and the fossilised remains of 40 mammalian species including macaque, pig, bear, and horse.

==== Cap Deposit ====
This deposit, located 60m above the riverbed, is filled with layers of sand and gravel, and dates to the late Early Pliocene era. Excavations from 1937 to 1938 unearthed mammalian fossils including civet and bamboo rat.

==== New Cave ====
Discovered in 1967, this cave connects with Locality 4 to its south. The deposits formed by hydrostatic sedimentation in stagnant water conditions contained no fossils or human-related artefacts.

==== Locality 12 ====
Discovered in 1933, when Locality 3 was being excavated, this column-shaped corrosion pit is filled with red grit, and dates to the late Early Pleistocene era. Excavations unearthed fossils of 22 mammalian species, including sabre-toothed tiger and an extinct primate.

==== Locality 13 ====
This fissure in a limestone mound 1 km south of the Peking Man Site dates to the early Middle Pleistocene era and is the earliest site of cultural remains excavated so far at Zhoukoudian. Excavations of the thin-bedded sandy clay about 50m above the river bed have unearthed stone artefacts, ash and charred bones, and 36 species of deeply fossilised mammalian bones including thick-jawed giant deer, and sabre-toothed tiger.

==== Locality 14 ====
This narrow limestone cave 1.5 km (0.93 mi) south of the Peking Man Site dates to the early Pliocene era, and has yielded some of Zhoukoudian's oldest fossils, dating back 5 million years. Excavations in 1933, 1951, and 1953 of the thin-bedded fine sandstone about 70m above the river bed have unearthed more than 600 nearly complete fish fossils of four different species, two of which are now extinct.

==== Locality 15 ====
Discovered in 1932, this relatively young site dates to around 100,000 to 200,000 years ago. Excavations from 1934–35 revealed three layers; an upper layer of loess and limestone debris; a middle layer containing ash, lithics, burned bones and hackberry seeds; and a lower layer of red clay containing lithics, and bird and mammalian fossils including woolly rhino, giant deer, and gazelle. The site has yet to be fully excavated.

== Gallery ==
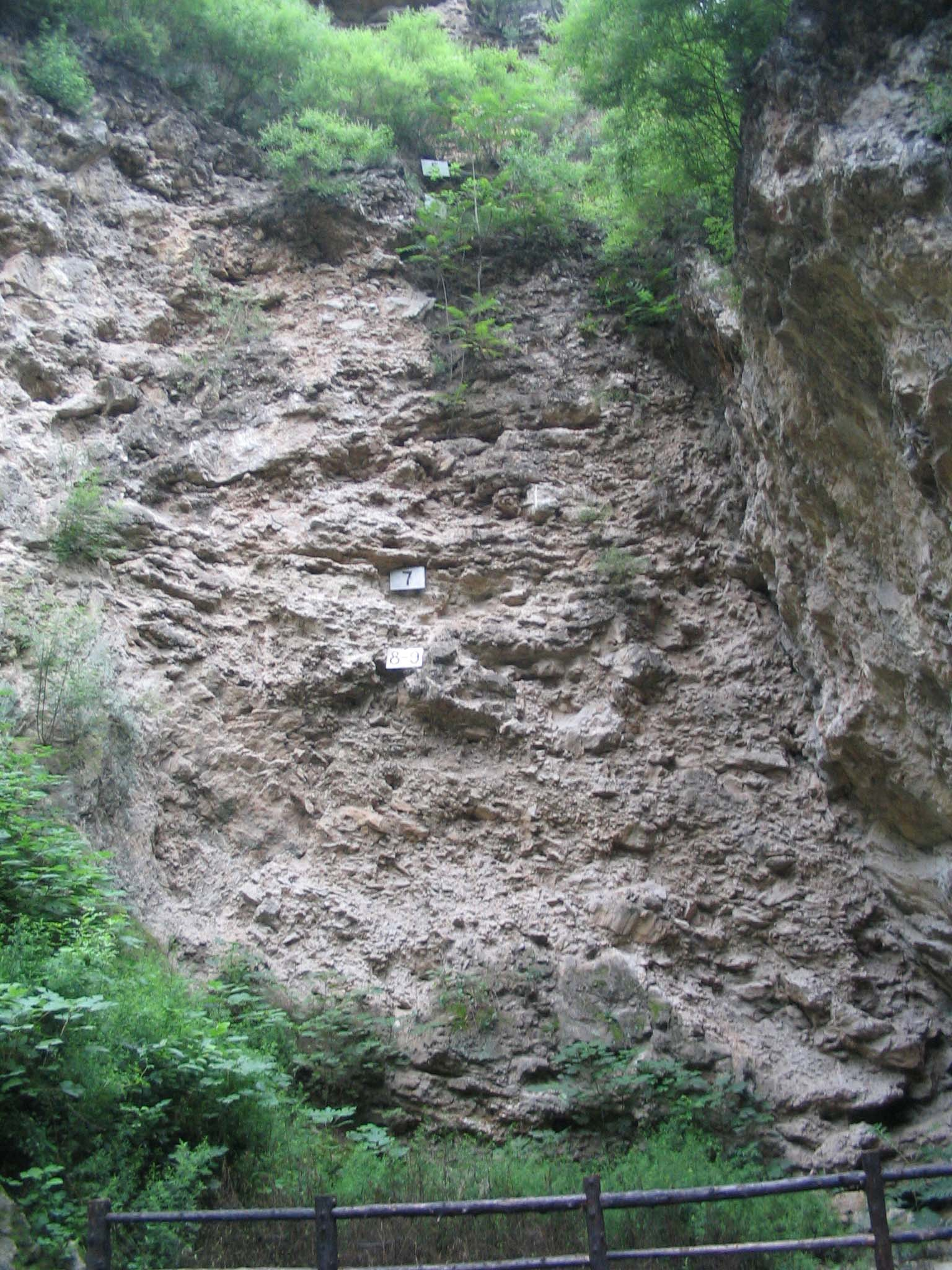
Peking Man Site (Locality 1)

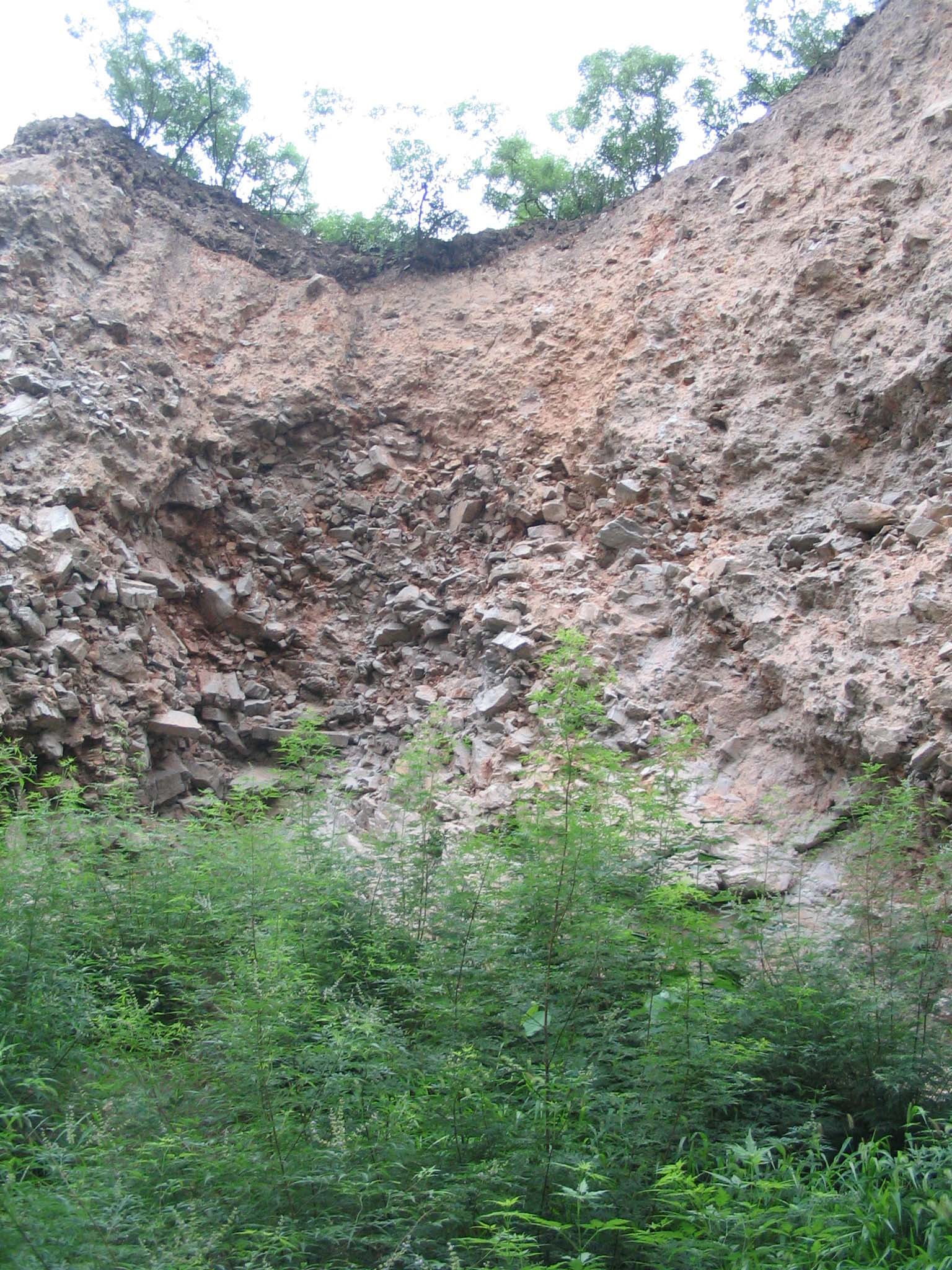
Locality 3

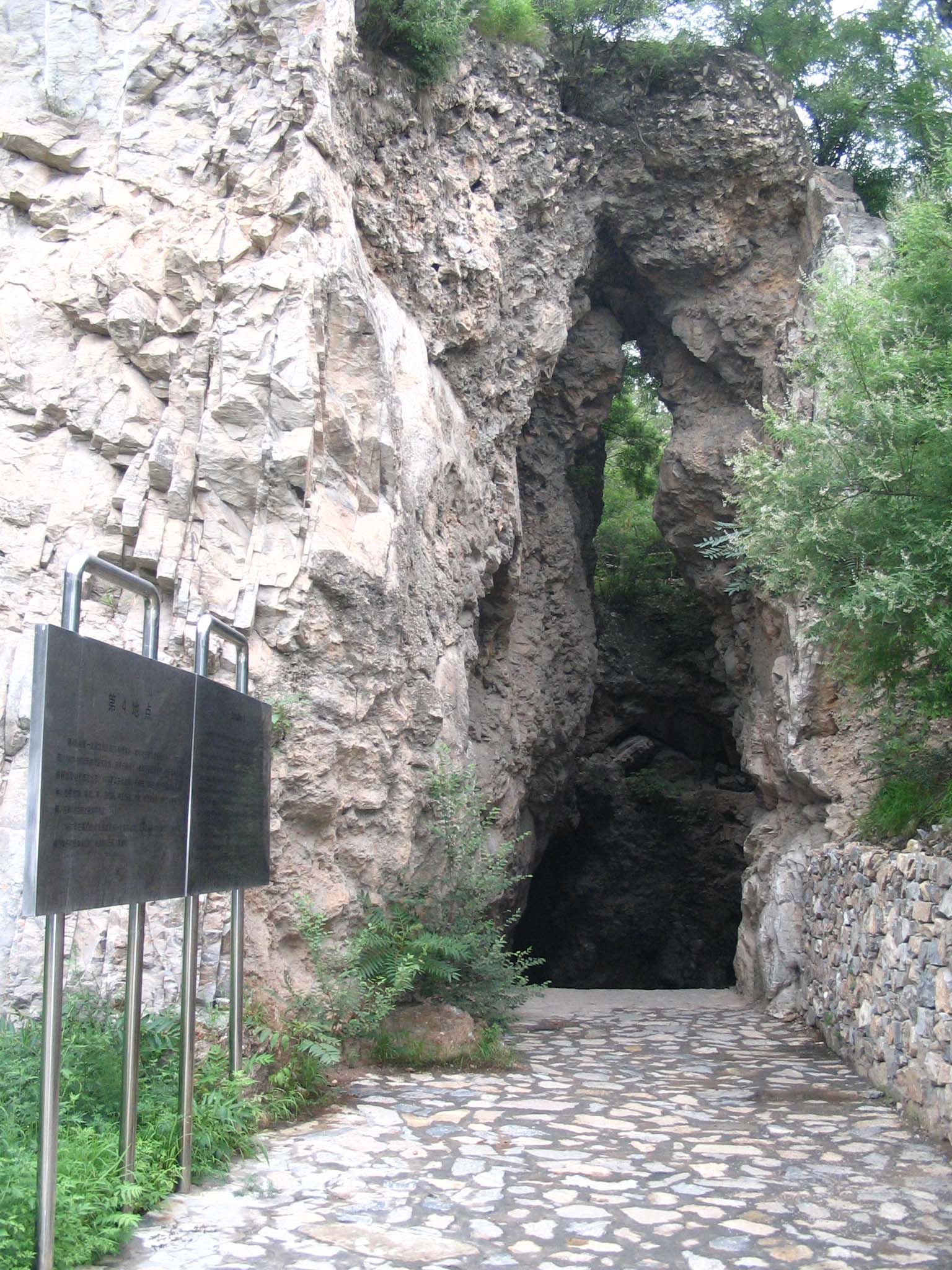
Locality 4

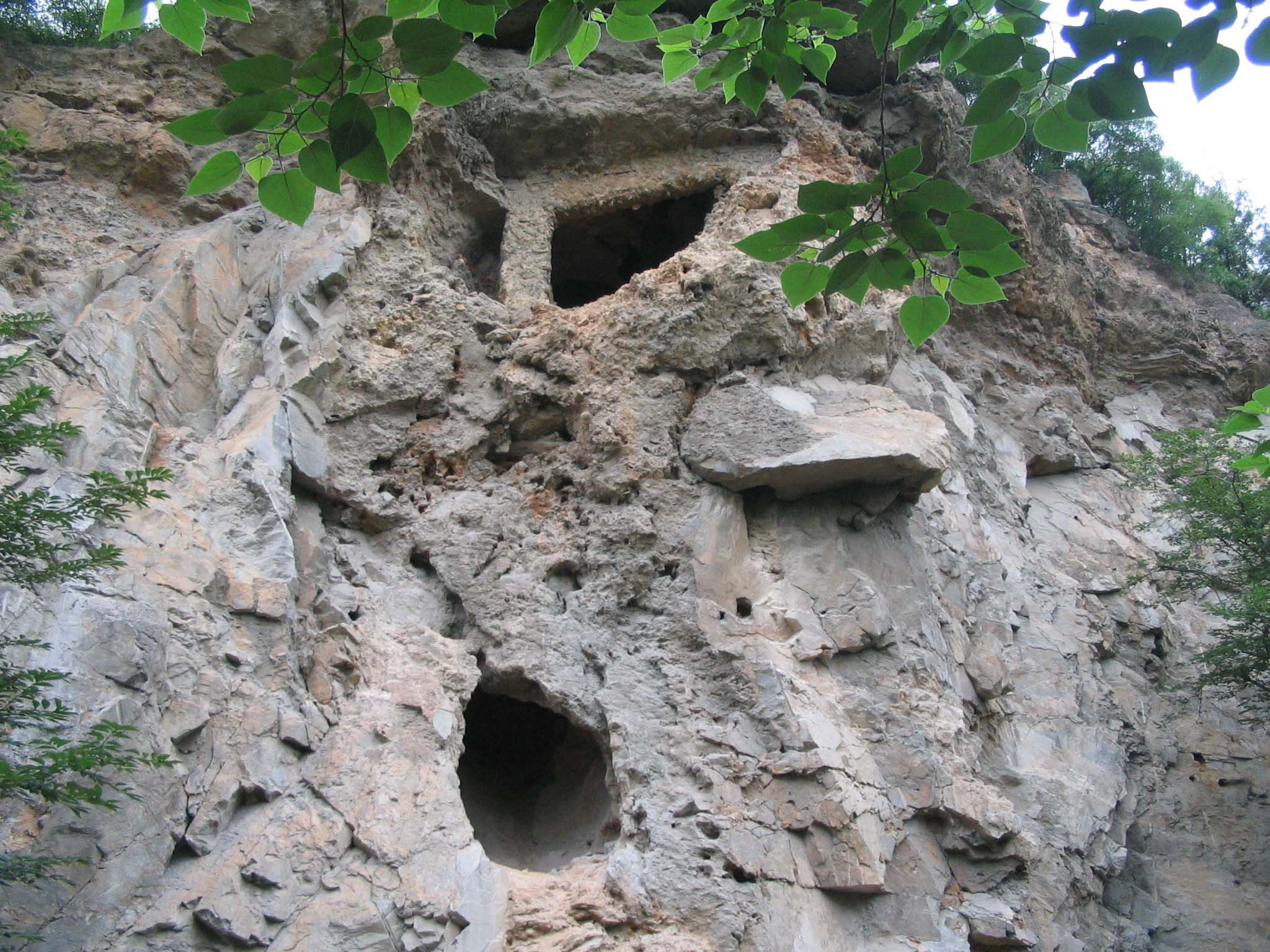
Locality 5

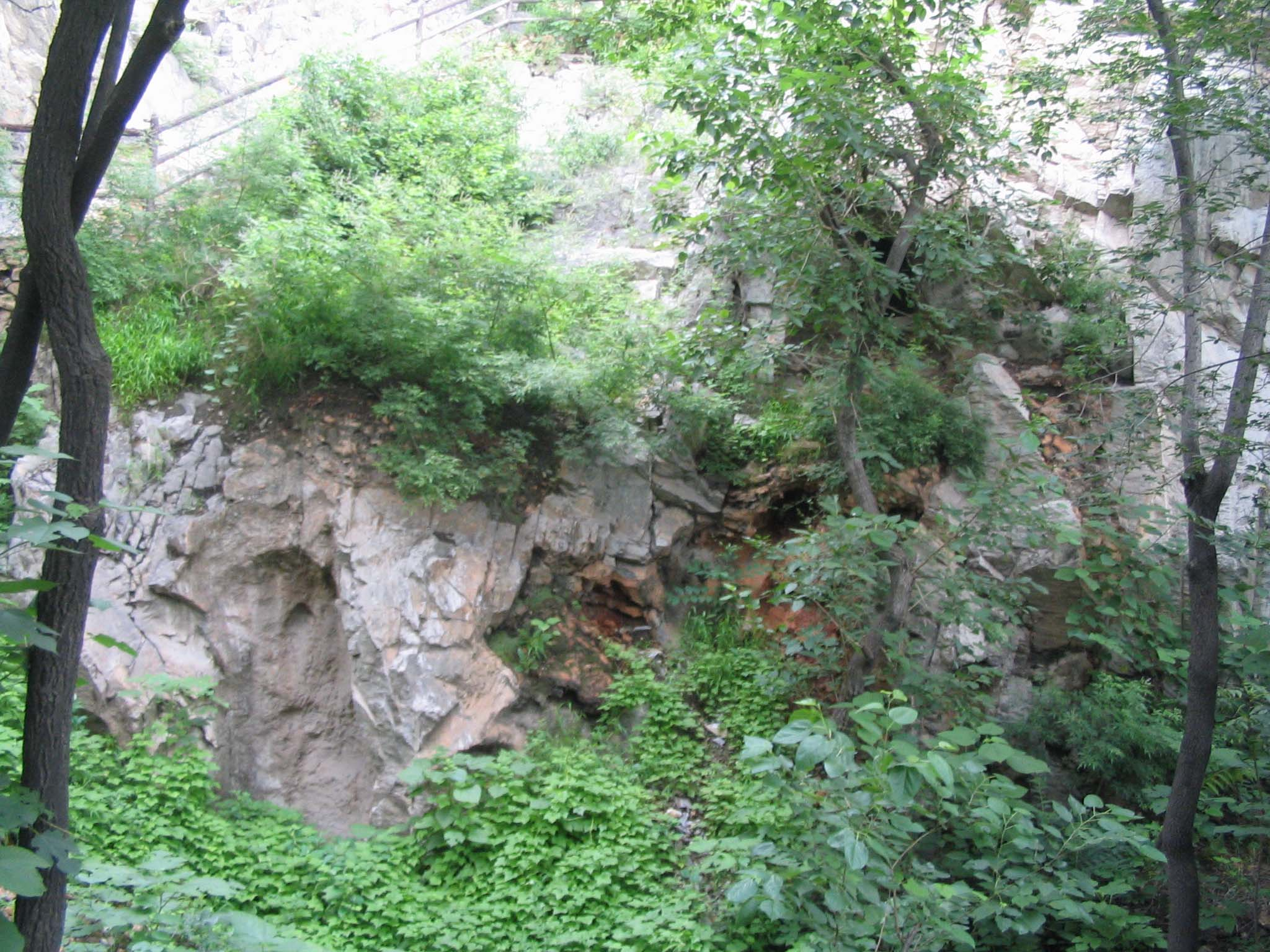
Locality 12

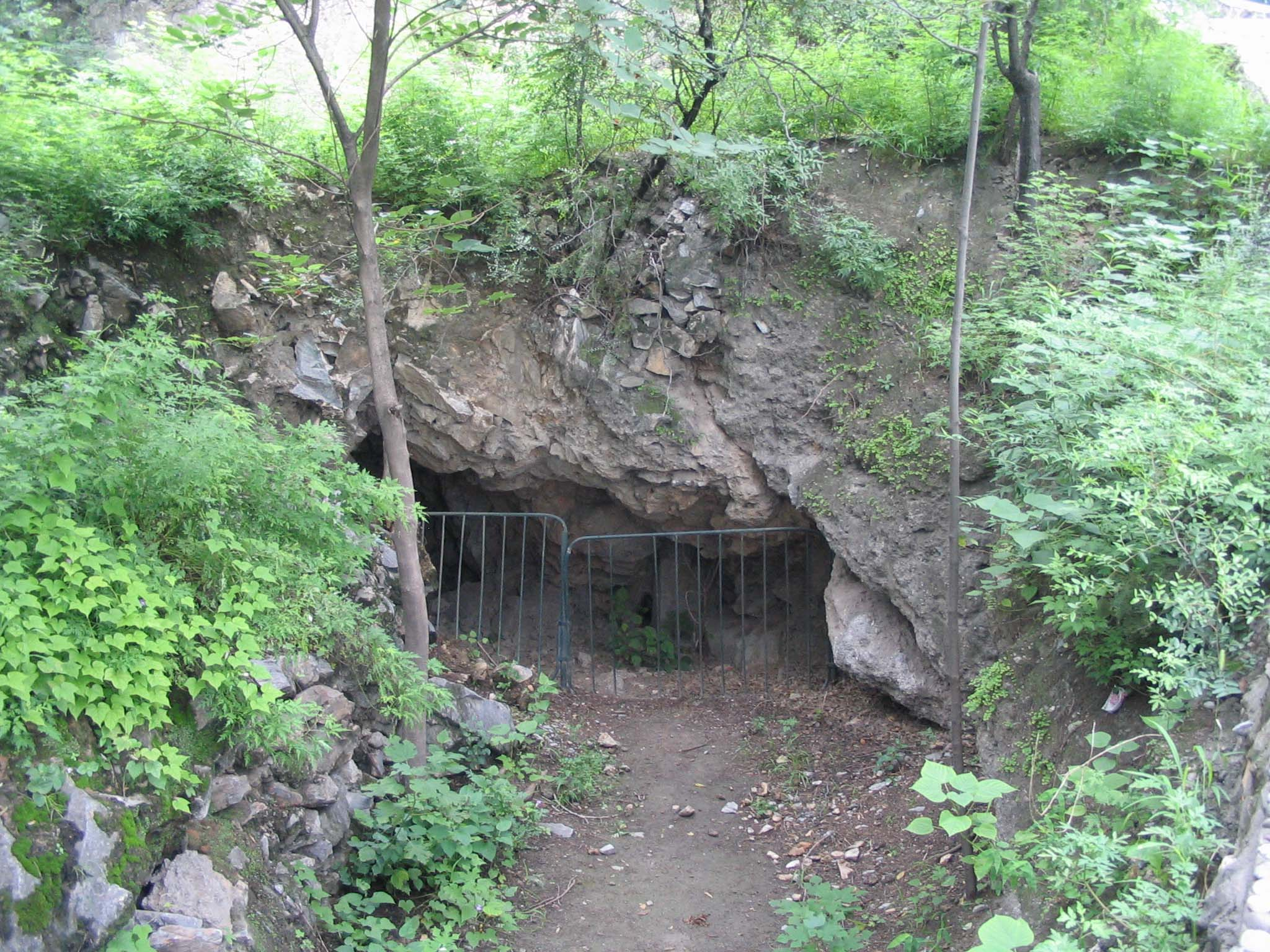
Locality 15

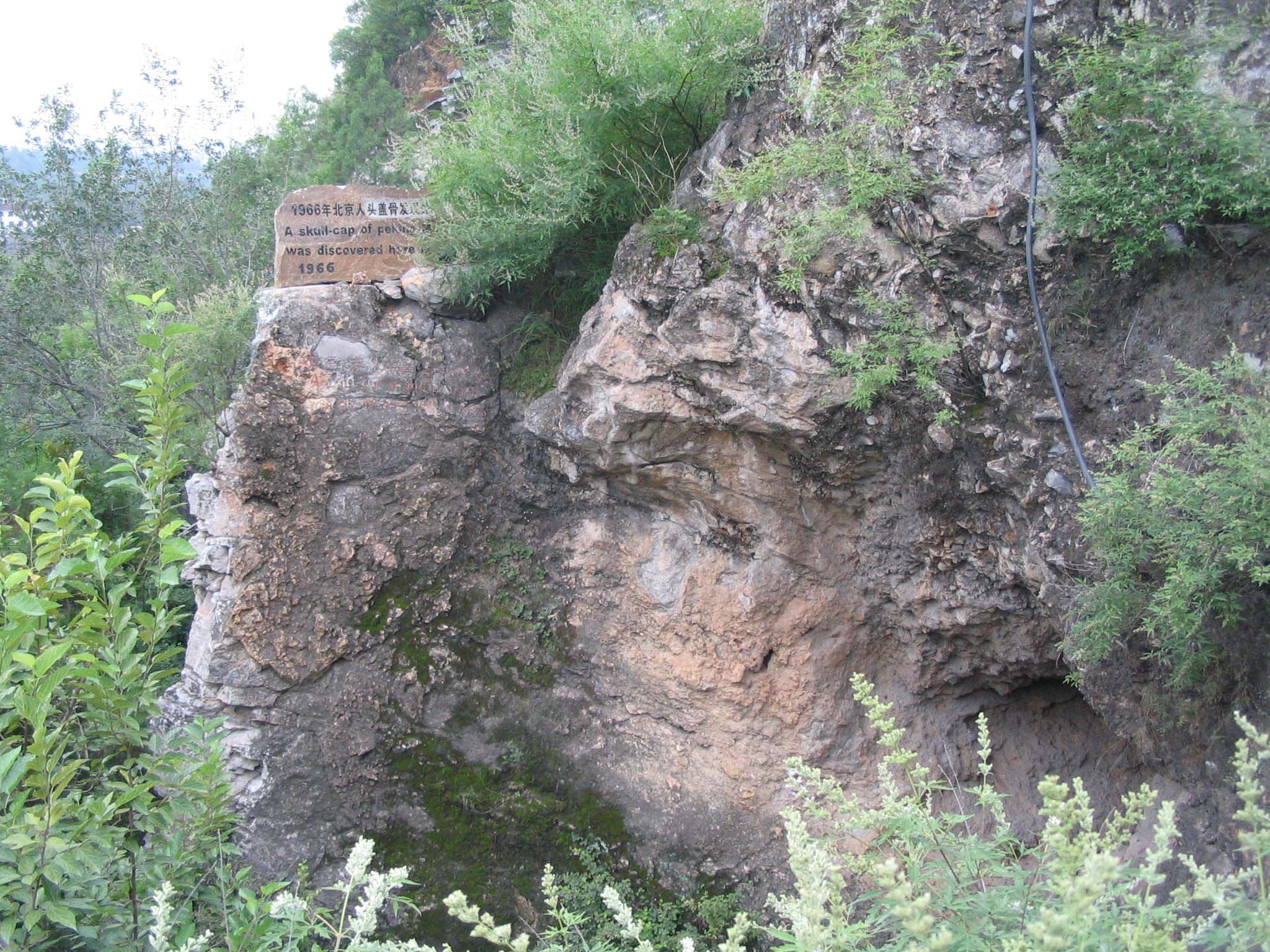
Site of skull find in 1966

== See also ==
- List of fossil sites (with link directory)
- List of hominina (hominid) fossils (with images)
- List of World Heritage Sites in China
- List of Paleolithic sites in China
- Peking Man
