= 1928 in archaeology =

| List of years in archaeology | (table) |
- … 1918; 1919; 1920; 1921; 1922; 1923; 1924; 1925; 1926; 1927; 1928; 1929; 1930; 1931; 1932; 1933; 1934; 1935; 1936; 1937; 1938 …
- In science 1925 1926 1927 1928 1929 1930 1931
- Art; Archaeology; Architecture; Literature; Music; Philosophy; Science; +...

Below are notable events in archaeology that occurred in 1928.

== Explorations ==
- American astronomer and University of Arizona professor A. E. Douglass participates in a National Geographic Society research project under Neil Merton Judd exploring Chaco Canyon. Using his newly invented technique of dendrochronology, Douglass dates Chetro Ketl and dozens of Chacoan sites (through 1929).
- Tell Arpachiyah in Iraq explored by Reginald Campbell Thompson.

== Excavations ==
- September: John Garstang conducts first excavations at Et-Tell.
- September–October: Porlock Stone Circle on Exmoor in England surveyed by Harold St George Gray.
- Italian archaeologist Luigi Maria Ugolini begins excavations at Buthrotum in Epirus (modern-day Albania).
- V. Gordon Childe begins excavations at Skara Brae.
- Stuart Piggott begins excavations at Butser Hill.
- Marthe and Saint-Just Péquart begin excavation of Mesolithic sites on the Breton island of Téviec.
- The first excavations begin at Yinxu, China led by Li Chi of the Chinese Institute of History and Philosophy.
- Chinese archeologist Pei Wenzhong joins the continuing excavations at Peking Man site in Zhoukoudian, China.
- Excavations at Beit Shemesh (continue to 1931).
- Gertrude Caton Thompson begins excavations at Great Zimbabwe.
- Dorothy Garrod excavates cave sites in Judea and south Kurdistan.
- A Deutsche Orient-Gesellschaft and University of Pennsylvania team led by Oscar Reuther begins excavations at Ctesiphon.
- John Winter Crowfoot begins excavations of early Christian churches at Jerash (Gerasa) in Transjordan (continue to 1930).
- Mortimer Wheeler begins excavations at Lydney Park (continues to 1929).

== Finds ==
- Continuing excavations at Peking Man Site in Zhoukoudian, China led by Davidson Black uncover more fossils of a new species he dubs Sinanthropus pekinensis.
- Ruins of Ugarit.
- First traces of Mal'ta–Buret' culture found in Siberia.
- First inscriptions of Byblos syllabary excavated by Maurice Dunand.

== Publications ==
- V. Gordon Childe - The Most Ancient East: the oriental prelude to European prehistory.
- O. G. S. Crawford and Alexander Keiller - Wessex from the Air (Oxford).

== Miscellaneous ==
- Davidson Black founds the Cenozoic Research Laboratory for the research and appraisal of fossils unearthed at Peking Man Site in Zhoukoudian, China
- Rosicrucian Egyptian Museum inaugurated in San Jose, California

== Births ==
- February 2: Stanley South, American archaeologist; author of Method and Theory in Historical Archaeology (1977) (died 2016)
- March 8: Björn Ambrosiani, Swedish archaeologist
- April 26: Charles Thomas, Cornish prehistorian (died 2016)
- September 27: Margaret Rule, British maritime archaeologist (died 2015)

== Deaths ==
Arthur Mace of the British archaeologist Howard Carter excavation team, said to have died of arsenic poisoning in 1928.
