= 1929 in archaeology =

List of years in archaeology	(table)
- … 1919; 1920; 1921; 1922; 1923; 1924; 1925; 1926; 1927; 1928; 1929; 1930; 1931; 1932; 1933; 1934; 1935; 1936; 1937; 1938; 1939 …
- In science 1926 1927 1928 1929 1930 1931 1932
- Art; Archaeology; Architecture; Literature; Music; Philosophy; Science; +...

Below are notable events in archaeology that occurred in 1929.

== Explorations ==
- Expedition under Neil Merton Judd to collect dendrochronological specimens to date habitation of Chaco Canyon.
- Blackwater Draw, New Mexico, first recognized as archaeologically significant by Ridgely Whiteman.

== Excavations ==
- Agora in Athens.
- Amri.
- Excavations at Ugarit by Claude F. A. Schaeffer begin; first texts in Ugaritic discovered.
- New excavations of Tell Halaf, Syria, by Max von Oppenheim.
- Excavations of palaeolithic sites at Mount Carmel, including the first of the Skhul and Qafzeh hominins, by Dorothy Garrod begin (continue to 1934).
- First of the Pazyryk burials in Siberia, by M. P. Gryaznov.
- Grobiņa in Latvia, by Birger Nerman.
- Chinese archeologist Pei Wenzhong appointed field director of the continuing excavations at Peking Man Site in Zhoukoudian, China.
- Whitehawk Camp near Brighton in England by R. P. Ross Williamson and E. Cecil Curwen.

== Finds ==
- June 22: Beam HH-39 is extracted at the Show Low site in Arizona enabling A. E. Douglass to construct a continuous dendrochronology record back to AD 700 for the Southwestern United States.
- December 1: Chinese archaeologist Pei Wenzhong unearths the first skullcap at Peking Man Site in Zhoukoudian, China.
- Jade relics at Sanxingdui in China.
- Mummy of Queen Meritamen (daughter of Thutmose III).
- Roman Amphitheatre at Chester (England) found by Hugh Thompson.
- Ruins of Kamiros on Rhodes.
- Guido Ucelli discovers the barges of Caligula in Lake Nemi.
- The Lyres of Ur in the tomb of Puabi.

== Publications ==
- V. Gordon Childe - The Danube in Prehistory.

== Births ==
- May 6: Rosemary Cramp, British medieval archaeologist (died 2023)
- July 17: Elin C. Danien, American scholar of ancient Maya ceramics (died 2019)
- September 23: Viktor Sarianidi, Soviet archaeologist, discoverer of the Bactria–Margiana Archaeological Complex (died 2013)

== Deaths ==
- Rodolfo Amadeo Lanciani, Italian archaeologist (born 1845)
