= 1935 in archaeology =

List of years in archaeology	(table)
- … 1925; 1926; 1927; 1928; 1929; 1930; 1931; 1932; 1933; 1934; 1935; 1936; 1937; 1938; 1939; 1940; 1941; 1942; 1943; 1944; 1945 …
- In science 1932 1933 1934 1935 1936 1937 1938
- Art; Archaeology; Architecture; Literature; Music; Philosophy; Science; +...

Below are notable events in archaeology that occurred in 1935.

== Excavations ==
- September 18: Excavation of the Kirkhaugh cairns in Northumberland (England) by Herbert Maryon begins.
- December: Chinese prehistorian Jia Lanpo appointed field director of the continuing excavations at Peking Man site in Zhoukoudian, China.

== Finds ==
- February 28: The Ladby ship Viking grave is discovered on Funen in Denmark.
- June 29: First portion of Swanscombe skull, belonging to a woman from 400,000 BP, is discovered in England.
- October 7: The skeleton of the Mesolithic Loschbour man is discovered in Mullerthal, Luxembourg.
- A hoard of more than 11,000 Celtic coins is discovered at La Marquanderie on the Channel Island of Jersey.
- The mural of the Investiture of Zimrilim is discovered in Mari, Syria.
- Viking Age ruins at Narsaq in Greenland are discovered by Aage Roussell.

== Events ==
- July: The Ahnenerbe is established in Nazi Germany as a division of the Schutzstaffel "for the Study of the History of Primeval Ideas" in support of Nazi racial ideology.
- August 2: The USS Philadelphia (1776) is raised from Lake Champlain.
- V. Gordon Childe delivers the inaugural Presidential address to The Prehistoric Society in England on 'Changing Methods and Aims in Prehistory'.
- Col. William Hawley reburies cremated human remains in A47 of the Aubrey holes at Stonehenge in England.

== Awards ==
- Leonard Woolley knighted for his work in archaeology.

== Births ==
- January 19: Robin Birley, English archaeologist, director of excavations at the Roman site of Vindolanda (d. 2018)

== Deaths ==
- May 11: Edward Herbert Thompson, American Mayanist (b. 1857)
- May 19: T. E. Lawrence, British archaeologist of the Middle East, military officer, diplomat and author, result of motorcycle accident (b. 1888)
- December 2: James Henry Breasted, American Egyptologist (b. 1865)
