= 1933 in archaeology =

List of years in archaeology	(table)
- … 1923; 1924; 1925; 1926; 1927; 1928; 1929; 1930; 1931; 1932; 1933; 1934; 1935; 1936; 1937; 1938; 1939; 1940; 1941; 1942; 1943 …
- In science 1930 1931 1932 1933 1934 1935 1936
- Art; Archaeology; Architecture; Literature; Music; Philosophy; Science; +...

Below are notable events in archaeology that occurred in 1933.

== Explorations ==
- Hull of Henry V of England's flagship Grace Dieu identified in the River Hamble.

== Excavations ==
- Excavations at Et-Tell by Judith Marquet-Krause begin (continue through 1935).
- Excavations at Tell Arpachiyah by Max Mallowan and John Cruikshank Rose of the British School of Archaeology in Iraq.
- Excavations at Tepe Sialk by Roman Ghirshman began (continued in 1934 and 1937).
- Excavation of the mastaba of Senewosret-Ankh at Lisht in Egypt by the Metropolitan Museum of Art concludes.
- Excavations at Tintagel Castle by C. A. Ralegh Radford began (continued through 1938).
- Gordon Vivian begins preservation work at Pueblo Bonito, Chetro Ket and Casa Rinconada (through 1937).

== Finds ==
- August 9 - Hoard of silver denarii and a fragment of tartan cloth were found at Falkirk, Scotland.
- Ancient city of Mari, Syria.
- Rock art at Tassili n'Ajjer.
- The submerged site of Heracleion in Egypt is identified from the air.

== Publications ==
- Stuart Piggott and Grahame Clark - "The age of the British flint mines", Antiquity.

== Births ==
- May 11 - Anna Marguerite McCann, American underwater archaeologist (d. 2017)
- June 9 - Jerzy Kolendo, Polish archaeologist (d. 2014)
- August 10 - Denise Schmandt-Besserat, French-born archaeologist specialising in the origins of writing and information management
- November 5 – Sonia Elizabeth Chadwick, British early mediaeval archaeologist (d. 1999)
- November 15 – Elizabeth Fowler (née Burley), British medieval archaeologist (d. 2017)
- Don Brothwell, British archaeologist (d. 2016)
- Christos G. Doumas, Greek archaeologist
- Robert Sténuit, Belgian underwater archaeologist

== Deaths ==
- February 4 - Archibald Sayce, English Assyriologist (b. 1845)
- July 13 - Mary Brodrick, English Egyptologist (b. c.1858)
