= 1921 in archaeology =

List of years in archaeology	(table)
- … 1911; 1912; 1913; 1914; 1915; 1916; 1917; 1918; 1919; 1920; 1921; 1922; 1923; 1924; 1925; 1926; 1927; 1928; 1929; 1930; 1931 …
- In science 1918 1919 1920 1921 1922 1923 1924
- Art; Archaeology; Architecture; Literature; Music; Philosophy; Science; +...

Below are notable events in archaeology that occurred in 1921.

== Explorations ==
- Peking Man Site at Zhoukoudian, China is discovered by Swedish geologist Johan Gunnar Andersson and American palaeontologist Walter W. Granger.

== Excavations ==
- Peking Man Site at Zhoukoudian, China is first excavated by Austrian palaeontologist Otto Zdansky.
- Excavations at Beit She'an by the University of Pennsylvania begin (continue to 1933).
- Daya Ram Sahni starts excavations at Harrappa for the Archaeological Survey of India.
- Georgios Sotiriou starts excavations at the church of Agios Gregorios Theologue in Thebes, Greece.

== Finds ==
- Material unearthed by Otto Zdansky's excavations at Peking Man Site in Zhoukoudian, China which will eventually yield two human molars; but these finds will not be announced until 1926.
- Edward Thurlow Leeds discovers an early settlement site of the Anglo-Saxons at Sutton Courtenay, the first in England to be systematically excavated.
- Hjortspring boat.
- Pernik sword is discovered.

== Institutions ==
- Origin of Museum of Anatolian Civilizations in Ankara, Republic of Turkey.

== Publications ==
- January - Society of Antiquaries of London begins publication of The Antiquaries Journal.

== Births ==
- March 11 - Philip Rahtz, English archaeologist (d. 2011)
- May 2 - B. B. Lal, Indian archaeologist (d. 2022)

== Deaths ==
- November 4 - Oscar Montelius, Swedish archaeologist (b. 1843)
