= 1936 in archaeology =

List of years in archaeology	(table)
- … 1926; 1927; 1928; 1929; 1930; 1931; 1932; 1933; 1934; 1935; 1936; 1937; 1938; 1939; 1940; 1941; 1942; 1943; 1944; 1945; 1946 …
- In science 1933 1934 1935 1936 1937 1938 1939
- Art; Archaeology; Architecture; Literature; Music; Philosophy; Science; +...

Below are notable events in archaeology that occurred in 1936.

== Events ==
- Pedestal of the Colossus of Nero in Rome removed.

== Excavations ==
- Dmanisi historic site, Georgia.
- Julliberrie's Grave by Ronald Jessup.
- Spiro Mounds by the University of Oklahoma.
- Fort Hawkins, Georgia, by Gordon Willey.
- Govurqala, Azerbaijan.
- Al Mina, Syria, by Leonard Woolley.
- Excavation and identification of necropolis at Beit She'arim.
- Excavations at Mersin by John Garstang begin (continue to 1939).
- New excavations at Viroconium (Wroxeter) in England begin (continue to 1937).

== Finds ==
- October - The Mästermyr chest, a Viking Age tool chest, is accidentally discovered in a mire on the island of Gotland, Sweden.
- November - Gebang Hindu temple at Yogyakarta on Java is discovered.
- Baghdad Battery discovered in Iraq.
- The Emesa helmet, from Roman cavalry, is found by looters near Homs in Syria.
- First undisturbed artefacts of Clovis culture found in New Mexico.
- The Statue of Iddi-Ilum is unearthed in Mari, Syria.

== Publications ==
- 6 July - Publication of Agatha Christie's novel Murder in Mesopotamia.
- First report on excavations of Iron Age settlement of Biskupin.
- V. Gordon Childe - Man Makes Himself.
- W. F. Grimes - The Megalithic Monuments of Wales.

== Births ==
- 4 April - Barri Jones, Welsh Classical archaeologist (d. 1999)
- 12 July - John Wilkes, English Classical archaeologist

== Deaths ==
- 9 May - Humfry Payne, English Classical archaeologist (b. 1902)
- 10 October - Luigi Maria Ugolini, Italian archaeologist (b. 1895)
- December 12 - Arthur Callender, English engineer and archaeologist, assistant to Howard Carter during the excavation of Tutankhamun's tomb (b. 1875)
