= Cenozoic Research Laboratory =

Chinese research institute

The Cenozoic Research Laboratory (Chinese: 新生代地质与环境研究室) of the Geological Survey of China was established within the Peking Union Medical College in 1928 by Canadian paleoanthropologist Davidson Black and Chinese geologists Ding Wenjing and Weng Wenhao for the research and appraisal of Peking Man fossils unearthed at Zhoukoudian.

== History ==
Davidson Black founded the laboratory with an $80,000 grant from the Rockefeller Foundation and stayed on as honorary director until his death in 1934. He was replaced by Franz Weidenreich.

Excavations at Zhoukoudian ceased in 1937 with the Japanese occupation and the fossils from the site were locked in the laboratory safe under the assumption that they would be secure at the American-run hospital.

However, in the summer of 1941, fearing imminent war between America and Japan, Weidenreich ordered copies of the bones to be made. When this task had been completed secretary Hu Chengzi prepared the fossils to be shipped to the U.S. for safekeeping until the end of the war. They disappeared in transit, and have not resurfaced.

Only Weidenreich's copies and the research notes of the staff remain as research materials on the fossils. The laboratory is considered to be the precursor of the modern Institute of Vertebrate Paleontology and Paleoanthropology (IVPP) of the Chinese Academy of Sciences.

== Staff ==
- Bian Mienmien joined in 1931 and undertook excavations at Zhokoudian until they ceased in 1937.
- Davidson Black founded the laboratory in 1928 and served as its honorary director until he died at his desk in 1934.
- Ding Wenjing assisted in the founding of the laboratory and served as honorary director in its early years.
- Jia Lanpo joined in 1931 and took over the running of the excavations at Zhoukoudian from 1935-37.
- Pei Wenzhong joined in 1928, took over the running of the excavations at Zhoukoudian from 1933-34, and returned in 1937.
- Pierre Teilhard de Chardin worked as a consultant from its foundation.
- Franz Weidenreich appointed honorary director in 1935 following Black's death.
- Yang Zhongjian took over the running of the excavations at Zhoukoudian from 1928 to 1933.
