= 1844 in archaeology =

Below are notable events in archaeology that occurred in 1844.

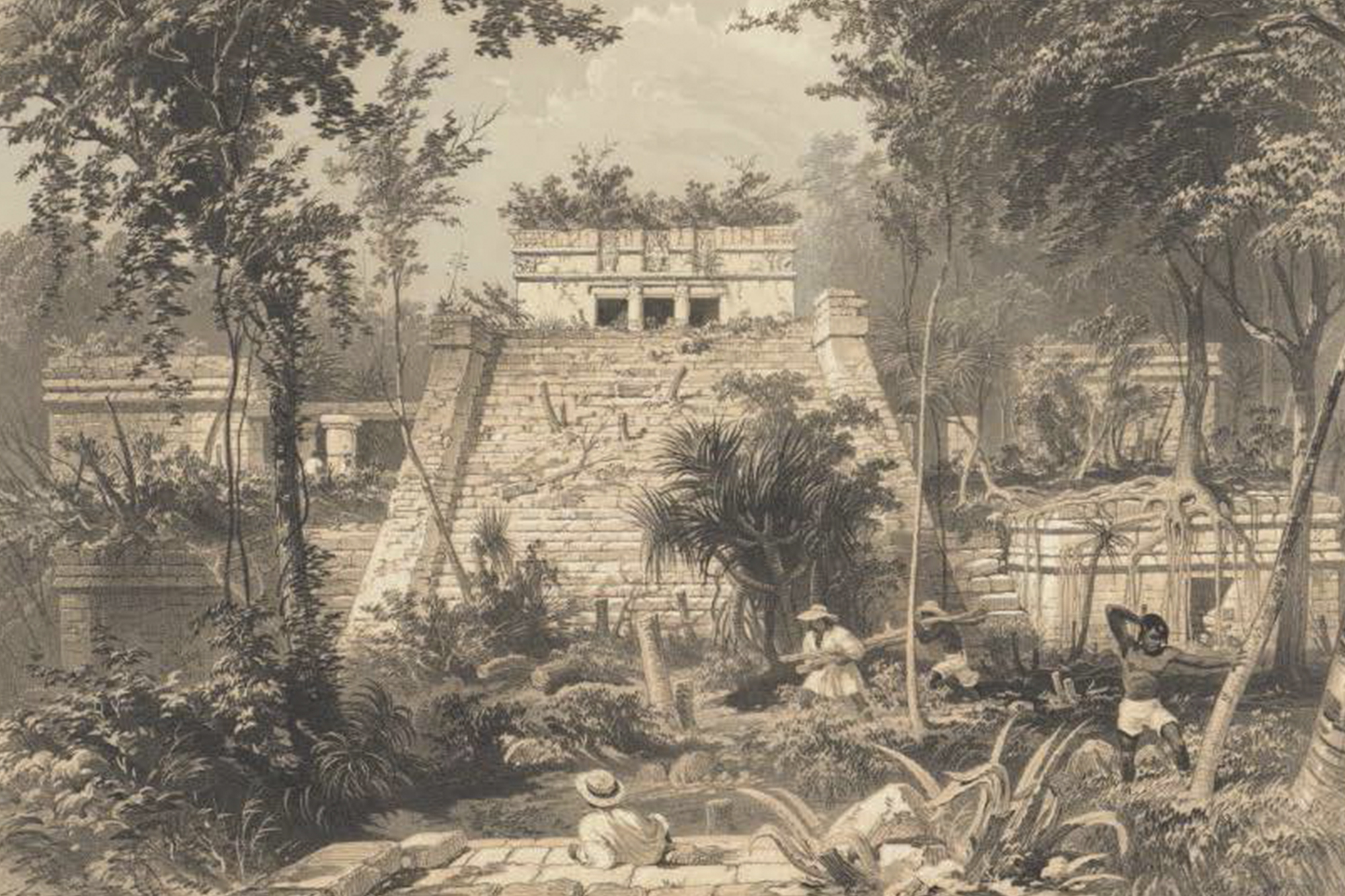
Lithograph of ruins at Tulum, by Frederick Catherwood

== Explorations ==
- Karl Richard Lepsius examines, describes, and maps Meroë; and partially explores the upper passage of tomb KV20 in the Valley of the Kings.

== Excavations ==
- Frances Stackhouse Acton excavates a Roman villa in the grounds of her home at Acton Scott in England.

== Finds ==
- The François Vase is discovered in fragments at Chiusi in Tuscany by Alessandro François.
- Nendrum Monastery is located on Hadrian's Wall by William Reeves.
- Discovery of Rudchester Mithraeum in the north of Ireland.

== Publications ==
- Views of Ancient Monuments in Central America by Frederick Catherwood, with color lithographs of ruins of the Maya civilization.
- March - The Archaeological Journal first published. The first volume includes Frederick Lukis's "Observations on the primeval antiquities of the Channel Islands" (pp. 144–52).

== Births ==
- August 3 - Marcel-Auguste Dieulafoy, French archaeologist of Iran (d. 1920)

== See also ==
- List of years in archaeology
- 1843 in archaeology
- 1845 in archaeology
