= 1856 in archaeology =

Below are notable events in archaeology that occurred in 1856.

== Finds ==
- First remains of Neanderthal Man found in the Neandertal Valley of Germany.
- Södermanland Runic Inscription 113 discovered in Sweden.
- Two busts of Antinous are found in Patras, Greece.

== Births ==
- 28 September: Edward Herbert Thompson, American Mayanist (died 1935)

== See also ==
- List of years in archaeology
- 1855 in archaeology
- 1857 in archaeology
