= 1846 in archaeology =

Below are notable events in archaeology that occurred in 1846.

== Explorations ==
- Johann Georg Ramsauer discovers a large prehistoric cemetery near Hallstatt.
- Ephraim Squier and Edwin Davis find and describe Serpent Mound in Ohio.

== Excavations ==
- The Rev. John Wilson publishes "Antiquities found at Woodperry, Oxon", an early account of excavations at a medieval village site (in Oxfordshire, England).

== Finds ==
- The Stele of Arniadas is found at the necropolis of the Corfu Palaiopolis.

== Events ==
- August 10 - The Smithsonian Institution is founded in Washington, D.C.
- The Cambrian Archaeological Association is founded in Wales by Harry Longueville Jones and John Williams (Ab Ithel) and launches its journal Archaeologia Cambrensis.
- The French School at Athens is founded.

== Publications ==
- Jacques Boucher de Crèvecœur de Perthes first publishes his discoveries over the previous two decades of a worked flint implement in the context of elephant and rhinoceros remains in the gravels of the Somme valley
- John Disney publishes first edition of Museum Disneianum
- Journal of the British Archaeological Association first published

== Births ==
- February 19 - Charles Simon Clermont-Ganneau, French Orientalist (d. 1923)

== See also ==
- List of years in archaeology
- 1845 in archaeology
- 1847 in archaeology
