= Ina Plug =

South African archaeozoologist

- Born: Ina Post; 5 August 1941 (age 85); Amsterdam, Netherlands
- Education: University of South Africa; University of Pretoria
- Known for: 130 scientific publications mostly about skeletal remains of southern African animals
- Scientific career
- Fields: Archaeozoology
- Workplaces: Transvaal Museum

Ina Plug (née Post) (born 5 August 1941) is a South African archaeozoologist (or zooarchaeologist), and teacher. Her long career included field research and in museums such as Transvaal Museum (now the Ditsong: National Museum of Natural History) and for the University of Pretoria on southern African mammals, starting with the animals from Iron Age sites at the Kruger National Park. Her work resulted in her publishing 130 scientific papers mostly on the skeletal remains of animals. She also published a book titled What Bone Is That? A Guide to the Identification of Southern African Mammal Bones.

During her research work Plug traveled widely to many countries to enhance her knowledge base and participated in many meetings of the International Council of Archaeozoologists (ICAZ) of which she is now a Council member.

== Early life ==
Ina Post was born on 5 August 1941 in Amsterdam, Netherlands to parents Gerritdina Fransina (née Bruinenberg) and Jan Post; she was their only daughter. Following the end of World War II the family had moved to South Africa, traveling on the ship Pretoria Castle in 1949. They had taken residence at Villieria, a suburb of Pretoria. Her initial school education was at the Primary School in Sunnyside and the Wonderboom High School. She completed her matriculation in 1959 with the principal of the high school supporting her, even though her mother had desired her to take up a job to run the family.

After matriculation, Plug worked as a librarian at the University of South Africa and concurrently took up further studies at the same university, receiving a BA degree in library science in 1968. At the university, in 1970, she met Cornelis Plug, a physicist at the Iscor (Iron and Steel Corporation) who later had a successful career in the Department of Psychology at the University of South Africa. She married Cornelis in 1962. They have two children, Ada and Ingrid; Ada is a social worker at the Leeukop Prison, Johannesburg, and Ingrid works as a librarian at the University of South Africa.

Plug then continued her studies in anthropology and archaeology at the university. She finished her studies in anthropology up to third-year level, and archaeology to second-year level as at that time the university provided college education in these subjects to that level only. Concurrently, she also studied for an Honours course in the Department of Anthropology (Volkekunde) in the University of Pretoria and received her Honours degree cum laude, in 1972.

== Research ==
In 1976, Plug started working at the newly created Department of Archaeozoology of the Transvaal Museum in Pretoria; initially as a volunteer for a small pay provided under the Liz Voigt research grant, with C.K. (‘Bob’) Brain. In 1978, she started working on a "half-day basis". The same year she received her master's degree from the University of Pretoria, with Professor J.F. Eloff as her guide, on the subject of "investigations of faunal and lithic remains from Bushman Rock Shelter", Mpumalanga in the northeastern region of South Africa. She then continued with her research work on faunal specimens obtained from various parts of Southern Africa.

In 1986, Plug became the Head Curator of the Department of Archaeozoology at the Transvaal Museum. She then participated, for the first time in 1986, in the conference of the International Council for Archaeozoology (ICAZ) in Bordeaux, France and subsequently became a member of ICAZ's International Committee. During this time, in Europe she was further trained in the field of archaeozoology under Angela von den Driesch of the Ludwig-Maximilians-Universität München, Germany and Anneke Claassen of the University of Groningen, Netherlands.

== Transvaal Museum upgrade ==
The Transvaal Museum, which initially in 1975 had only a small skeletal collection mostly of skulls and skins, was substantially expanded with the joint efforts of Voigt and Plug. The museum now boasts of the most extensive skeletal collections in Africa (South Africa, Lesotho, Eswatini, Mozambique, Zimbabwe, Botswana, Namibia, Malawi and Zambia) comprising the "full spectrum of the diverse fauna of Southern Africa" which covered Stone Age, Iron Age and the historical period. Most of the research is credited to Plug.

== Doctoral work ==
In 1988 Plug received her DPhil. Litt cum laude from the University of Pretoria. Her doctoral guides were Professor J.F. Eloff and Dr C.K. Brain and the thesis related to investigations of the faunal aspects of prehistoric lifeways in the Kruger National Park.

Plug held the post of deputy director at the Transvaal Museum and was also the Head Curator of the Department of Archaeozoology, until she retired in 1999. During her career, apart from writing papers and books based on her research which covered Early Stone Age, the Middle Stone Age, and the hunter-gatherers of the Later Stone Age, she was also involved in training many students in the field of anthropology, history, archaeology and wildlife from different institutions across the country.

Plug's research work has contributed richly to subjects of "faunal quantification, taphonomy, animal distributions, past environments, and modern wildlife."

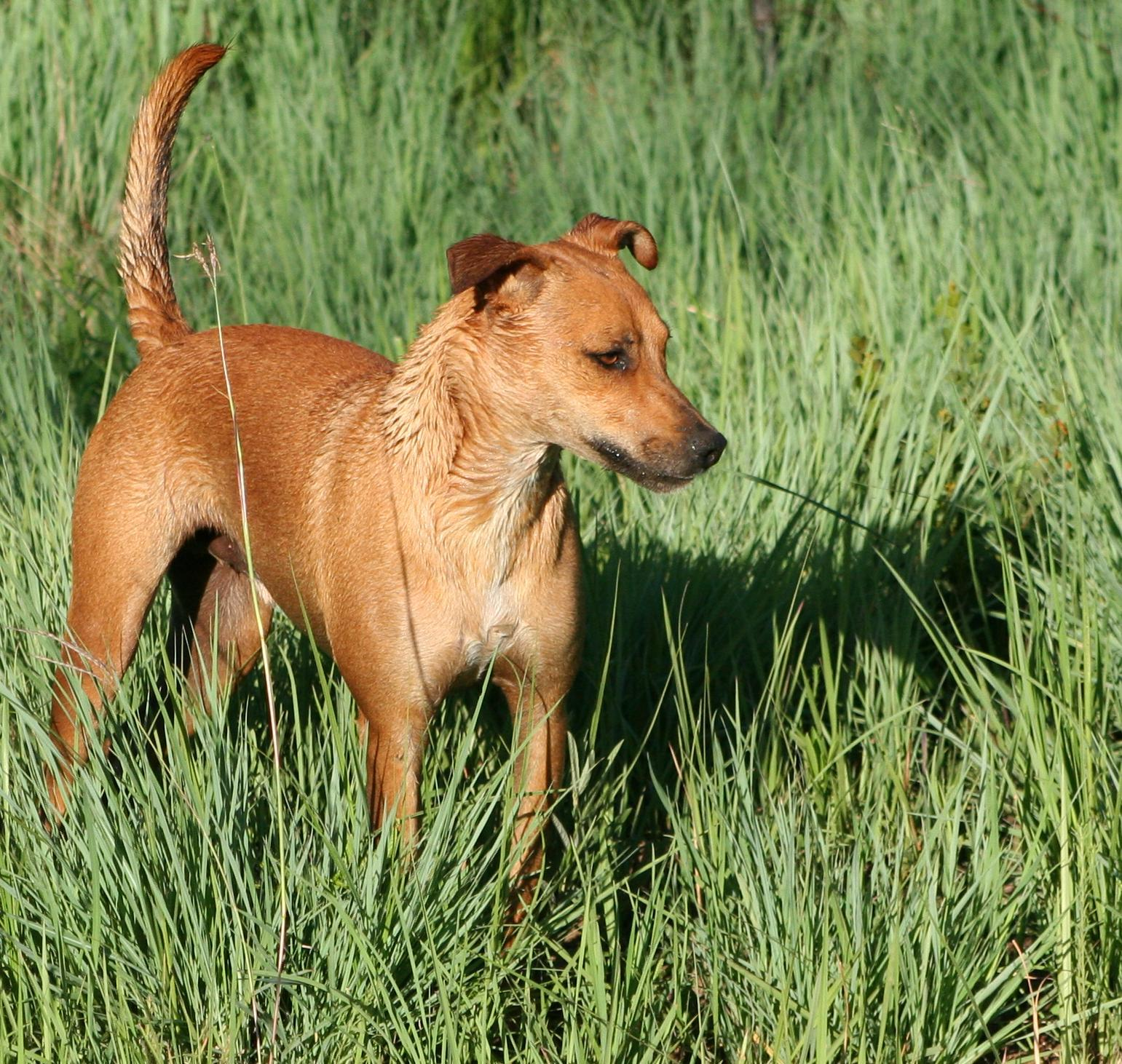
Domestic dog in South Africa

One of her prominent research work was on domestic dogs in South Africa. Dog remains from a site of an Early Iron Age settlement on the farm Diamant near Ellisras were dated to 570 AD. She identified two breeds of dogs, slender and stockier.

For her research work, Plug received financial support from the Foundation for Research Development, now the National Research Foundation, the Transvaal Museum, and the Human Sciences Research Council in Pretoria.

== Post-retirement ==
After retirement, Plug taught, part-time, at the University of Pretoria on subjects of archaeozoology and museology for many years. In 2005, she was made a research fellow in the Department of Anthropology and Archaeology of the University of South Africa and in 2008 was honoured with the status of Professor Extraordinarius. She continues to be associated with archaeozoological research not only in South Africa but also in Lesotho.

== Memberships ==
Plug has held memberships in many scientific institutions and societies such as:

- The African Museums Associations
- The Farm Animal Conservation Trust
- The South African Archaeological Society
- The Association of Southern African Professional Archaeologists,
- The International Council for Archaeozoology (ICAZ)
