= 1920 in archaeology =

- 1919 ^{.} 1920 ^{.} 1921
- Other events: 1920 ^{.} Archaeology timeline

Below are notable events in archaeology that occurred in 1920.

== Explorations ==
- Synagogue of Tomar identified in Portugal.

== Excavations ==
- Work begins at Pueblo Bonito and other sites in Chaco Canyon by Neil Merton Judd for the National Geographic Society (through 1927).
- Work begins on the Philistine site at Ashkelon (then al-Majdal) by John Garstang (through 1921).

== Finds ==
- March 30: Wall paintings at the Temple of Bel, Dura Europos on the Euphrates are discovered by a soldier.
- November 29: The Kedukan Bukit inscription, a stone written in the Pallava script of the Malay language and dated May 1, 683 AD (604 in the local calendar), is unearthed on the banks of the Tatang River on the Indonesian island of Sumatra at Palembang, significant as containing the earliest dated use of a symbol for zero and the oldest example of the Malay language.
- Hoby treasure is discovered on the Danish island of Lolland.

== Publications ==
- Sylvanus Morley - The Inscriptions of Copán

== Events ==
- O. G. S. Crawford is appointed as the first Archaeology Officer of the Ordnance Survey in the United Kingdom.
- The Romanian Academy in Rome is established.

== Births ==
- 22 January: Richard J. C. Atkinson, English prehistorian and archaeologist (d. 1994)
- 21 May: John Chadwick, English co-decipherer of Linear B (d. 1998)
- 22 August: Philip A. Barker, British archaeologist and castellologist (d. 2001)

== Deaths ==
- 25 February: Marcel-Auguste Dieulafoy, French archaeologist of Iran (b. 1844)
- 17 July: Heinrich Dressel, German archaeologist (b. 1845)
- 18 July: Robert Munro, Scottish archaeologist (b. 1835)

== See also ==
- List of years in archaeology
- 1919 in archaeology
- 1921 in archaeology
