= Govurqala, Nakhchivan =

Govurqala is a name shared by four archaeological sites in Azerbaijan, located in Nakhchivan.

Govurqala here is 35 km north-west from Nakhchivan, on the left bank of Araz. Inhabited place is dated back to the Bronze Age (3rd–2nd century BC), the area is over 5 ha. During the 1936 and 1967–75 excavations different stone tools, monochrome and polychrome ceramics, stone tombs etc. were revealed. In the middle of the 2nd century BC, the place turned into the town-like settlement and the centre of tribal alliances. Population was engaged in agriculture, stock-breeding and pottery-making.
