= 1857 in archaeology =

Below are notable events in archaeology that occurred in 1857.

== Events ==
- Shadwell forgeries first made.

== Excavations ==
- Coldrum Long Barrow in south east England.
- 16 November - The remains of English commander John Fitzalan, 7th Earl of Arundel (died of wounds in France, 1435) are excavated in the Fitzalan Chapel of Arundel Castle in England, demonstrating that he had been buried in accordance with his will.

== Finds ==
- First artifacts of La Tène culture at La Tène, Switzerland.
- Battersea Shield in the River Thames.

== Publications ==
- William Wilde begins publication of a classified catalogue of the museum of the Royal Irish Academy.

== Births ==
- 3 June - Jacques de Morgan, French archaeologist (d. 1924)
- 27 July - E. A. Wallis Budge, English Egyptologist (d. 1934)

== Deaths ==
- 6 May - John Disney, English barrister and archaeologist (b. 1799)

== See also ==
- List of years in archaeology
- 1856 in archaeology
- 1858 in archaeology
