= Pei Wenzhong =

Chinese paleontologist, archaeologist and anthropologist

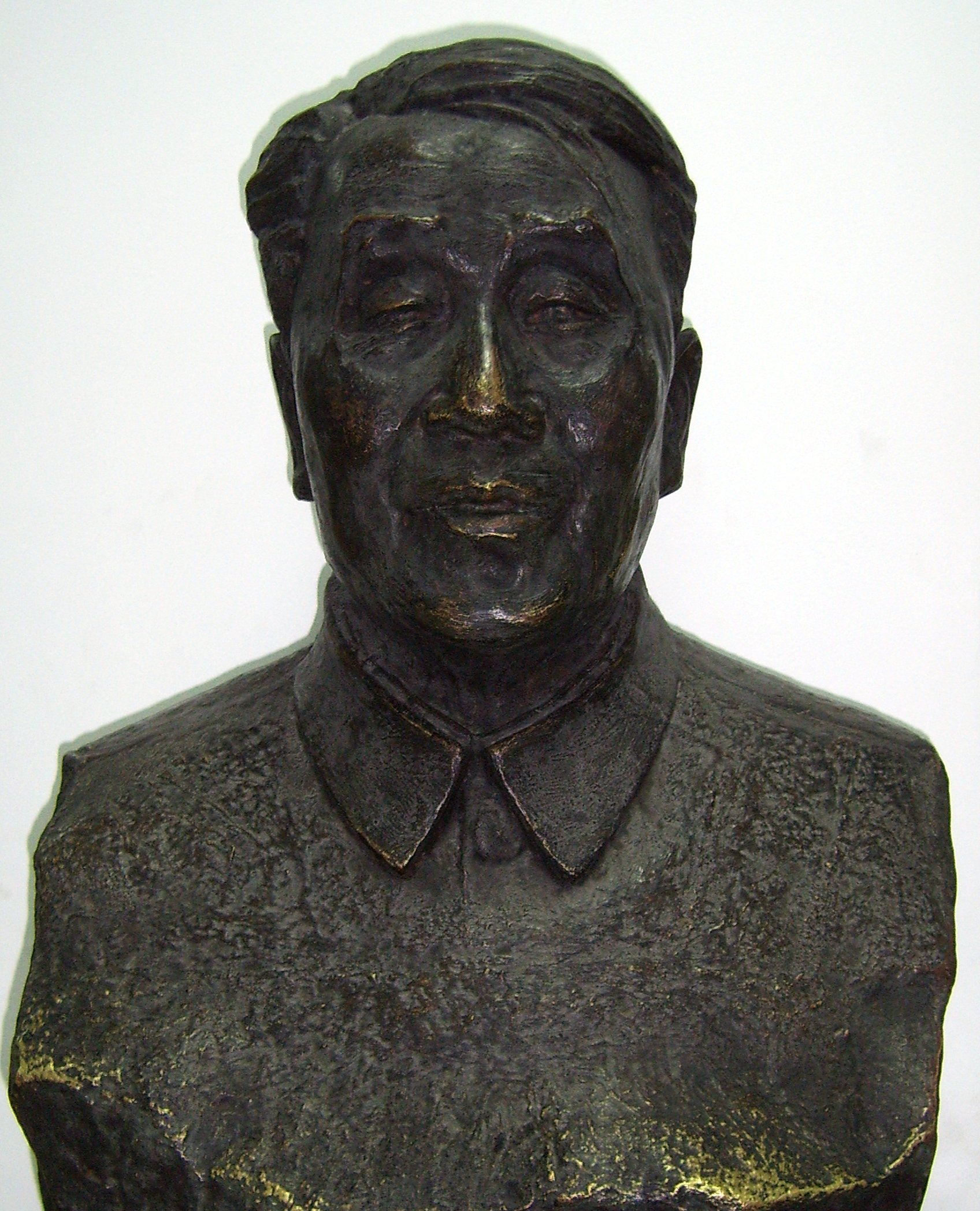
- Statue of Pei Wenzhong in Beijing Natural History Museum
- Born: January 19, 1904; Fengnan, Hebei, Qing Dynasty
- Died: September 18, 1982 (aged 78)
- Occupations: Field researcher, professor
- Known for: Peking Man excavations Discovery of Canis lupus variabilis
- Title: Chairman of Chinese Association of Natural Science Museums

Academic background
- Education: Peking University; University of Paris
- Influences: Yang Zhongjian

Academic work
- Discipline: Paleontology, anthropology, archaeology
- Sub-discipline: Paleoanthropology, paleoarchaeology
- Institutions: Cenozoic Research Laboratory, Chinese Academy of Sciences, Beijing Museum of Natural History
- Main interests: Chinese prehistory
- Influenced: Jia Lanpo

Pei Wenzhong (Chinese: 裴文中; pinyin: Péi Wénzhōng; Wade–Giles: P'ei Wen-chung; January 19, 1904 – September 18, 1982), or W. C. Pei, was a Chinese paleontologist, archaeologist and anthropologist born in Fengnan. He is considered a founding figure of Chinese anthropology.

== Career ==
Pei graduated from Peking University in 1928 and went to work for the Cenozoic Research Laboratory of the Geological Survey of China joining the excavations of the Peking Man Site at Zhoukoudian, where he was named the field director of the excavations the following year. The work at Zhoukoudian was carried out under difficult conditions: for example, the scientists had to ride there on mules, some 40 km southwest of the city of Beijing. The first fossil hominin skullcap was recovered by Pei "working in a 40-meter crevasse in frigid weather with a hammer in one hand and a candle in the other on December 2, 1929, at 16.00 hours (local).

From 1933 to 1934, he supervised the excavation of the Upper Cave at Zhoukoudian and was director of the Zhoukoudian Office of the Cenozoic Research Laboratory of the Geological Survey of China. Here he discovered and classified the small, extinct "Zhoukoudian wolf" (Canis lupus variabilis). He left the excavation in 1935 to pursue a doctoral degree at the University of Paris and was succeeded by Professor Jia Lanpo. He returned to the excavation in 1937, shortly before they ceased due to the Japanese invasion of north China.

After Zhoukoudian, Pei worked at many other archaeological sites, including Djalainor (Zhalainu'er) in eastern Inner Mongolia and in Gansu. In 1955 he was elected to membership in the Chinese Academy of Sciences, became the first Chairman of Chinese Association of Natural Science Museums, and the second director of Beijing Museum of Natural History. Until his death in 1982, he worked at the Institute of Vertebrate Paleontology and Paleoanthropology (IVPP) of the Chinese Academy of Sciences. He also wrote several books, including the first on Chinese prehistory written in Chinese.

His cremated remains are interred behind the museum at the Zhoukoudian site alongside those of his colleagues, Yang Zhongjian and Jia Lanpo.

== Publications ==
Pei, W.C. (1934). The carnivora from locality 1 of Choukoutien. Palaeontologia Sinica, Geological Survey of China, Beijing
PEI, W. C. (1934), REPORT ON THE EXCAVATION OF THE LOCALITY 13 IN CHOUKOUTIEN. Bulletin of the Geological Society of China, 13: 359–368. doi: 10.1111/j.1755-6724.1934.mp13001021.x
PEI, W. C. (1934), A PRELIMINARY REPORT ON THE LATE-PALÆOLITHIC CAVE OF CHOUKOUTIEN. Bulletin of the Geological Society of China, 13: 327–358. doi: 10.1111/j.1755-6724.1934.mp13001020.x
