= Elin C. Danien =

American anthropologist (1929–2019)

Elin Corey Danien
- Born: July 17, 1929; New York City, New York
- Died: February 19, 2019 (aged 89); Exton, Pennsylvania
- Education: B.A. Anthropology, University of Pennsylvania, 1982; M.A. Anthropology, University of Pennsylvania; PhD, Anthropology, University of Pennsylvania, 1998
- Spouse: Wilton R. "Bud" Danien
- Scientific career
- Fields: Ancient Maya ceramics
- Institutions: Penn Museum
- Thesis: The Chama Polychrome Ceramic Cylinders in the University of Pennsylvania Museum (1998)
- Doctoral advisor: Robert J. Sharer

Elin Corey Danien (1929–2019) was an American anthropologist and scholar of ancient Maya ceramics. She was an expert on Chamá pottery: polychrome, cylindrical vases produced in the eighth century CE in the highlands of what is now Guatemala. After earning BA, MA, and PhD degrees from the University of Pennsylvania, Danien worked at the Penn Museum, where she conducted and published research, developed exhibits, initiated public outreach events including "Member's Nights" and an annual "Maya Weekend", and later, after retirement, volunteered as a docent. She co-founded the museum's Pre-Columbian Society, which gathered professional and amateur scholars interested in indigenous peoples of the Americas. As a philanthropist, she founded a scholarship program called Bread Upon the Waters which gave women over age thirty the opportunity to pursue and complete undergraduate degrees at the University of Pennsylvania through part-time study. A colleague remembered her as someone who was "more than a force of nature," and who often claimed that, "Archaeology is the most fun you can have with your pants on."

== Education and career ==
Born in New York City July 17, 1929, Elin Corey Danien became interested in Central America and its pre-Columbian culture when she hitchhiked to Mexico as a young woman and stayed in the region for two years. She later worked as an advertising copywriter in New York and then, in the early 1970s, moved to Philadelphia.

Danien earned her BA degree from the University of Pennsylvania in Anthropology in 1982, summa cum laude, by which time she was fifty-three years old. She went on to earn an MA degree and, in 1998, her PhD, also from Penn. For her doctoral dissertation, she studied the Penn Museum's collection of Chamá pottery, which the archaeologist Robert Burkitt had excavated between 1912 and 1937. With her husband, Wilton R. "Bud" Danien (who died in 2013), Danien traveled to Guatemala in 1979 and found many of the records and papers of Robert Burkitt in the stables of a ranch in Cobán. With the ranch owner's permission, Danien took the papers back to Philadelphia and deposited them in the archives of the Penn Museum, for researchers to consult.

Danien worked as Events Coordinator for the Penn Museum from 1981 to 1989. She also started the annual Maya Weekend, which ran from 1983 to 2013, and which exposed Museum visitors to Mayan epigraphy (reading Mayan glyphs). Later, recognizing her work as a volunteer and her connection to the Penn Museum for more than forty years, the Penn Museum recognized her as its Volunteer of the Year for 2015.

She died February 19, 2019.

== Scholarship and publications ==
Danien earned an Anthropology PhD for her 1998 dissertation entitled "The Chama Polychrome Ceramic Cylinders in the University of Pennsylvania Museum", which she wrote under the supervision of Robert J. Sharer. The Penn Museum's specimens were especially valuable for study, she argued, because they "constitute the only museum collection of Chama polychrome cylinders with provenience information." Her approach was interdisciplinary, combining approaches from archaeology, art history, epigraphy, ethnohistory, and more.

Danien compiled and edited a collection of Maya folktales, published in 2005 as Maya Folktales from the Alta Verapaz. This volume gathered stories that anthropologists and folklorists had recorded in Guatemala in the early twentieth century, including tales of the Popul Vuh, the ancient Maya creation legend. Danien also published several articles in the Penn Museum's magazine, Expedition. Her research formed the basis of an exhibit at the Penn Museum in 2009; it was called Painted Metaphors: Pottery and Politics of the Ancient Maya. She prepared a guide to the Penn Museum's Mesoamerican collections, and also edited a volume of conference papers on Alexander the Great and his father, Philip of Macedon.

== Philanthropy ==
In 1986, Danien founded a scholarship program at the University of Pennsylvania called Bread upon the Waters. The program took its name from a verse from the Bible – Ecclesiastes 11:1, "Cast thy bread upon the waters: for thou shalt find it after many days" – a statement often understood to mean that doing good for and sharing with others reaps rewards of its own. In 2009, the Charlotte W. Newcombe Foundation established a partnership with Penn to fund three of the twenty-five "Bread" scholarships that were intended for "serving Mature Students by offering free tuition for selected part-time students as a way of helping them earn a bachelor's degree". The Newcombe Foundation noted that Danien, the program's founder, "began her [own] freshman year at the age of forty-six" and appreciated the needs and challenges of "nontraditional students" when she graduated with her BA in seven years. The Newcombe Foundation also noted the successes of many past Bread scholars, including one who went on to earn a PhD, and another who became a prize-winning poet and high school teacher. Danien called graduates of this program her "daughters" and declared that "each one is a marvel!"
