= Jia Lanpo =

Chinese palaeoanthropologist

- 贾兰坡
- Born: November 25, 1908; Yutian County, Hebei, Qing Dynasty
- Died: July 8, 2001 (aged 92); Beijing, China
- Occupations: Field researcher, professor
- Known for: Zhoukoudian excavations

Academic background
- Education: Huiwen Academy; Cenozoic Research Laboratory
- Influences: Pierre Teilhard de Chardin, Henri Breuil, Davidson Black, Franz Weidenreich, Pei Wenzhong

Academic work
- Discipline: Anthropology, paleontology
- Sub-discipline: Palaeoanthropology, palaeoarchaeology
- Institutions: Institute of Vertebrate Paleontology and Paleoanthropology
- Main interests: Chinese prehistory

Jia Lanpo (Chinese: 贾兰坡; Wade–Giles: Chia Lan-p'o; November 25, 1908 in Yutian, Hebei – July 8, 2001 in Beijing) was a Chinese palaeoanthropologist, considered a founder of Chinese anthropology.

He graduated from the Huiwen Academy in Beijing in 1929 and went on to work as a trainee at the Cenozoic Research Laboratory of the Geological Survey of China. In April 1931 he joined the excavations at Zhoukoudian where fossils of Peking Man were discovered in 1921 and where he worked with many of the most renowned figures in paleoanthropology of his era, including Pierre Teilhard de Chardin, Henri Breuil, Davidson Black, Franz Weidenreich and Pei Wenzhong whom he replaced as the field director of the Zhoukoudian excavations in 1935. After the founding of the People's Republic of China in 1949, he served in many academic positions as well as working in the field, but he is most closely associated with the Chinese Academy of Sciences' Institute of Vertebrate Paleontology and Paleoanthropology (IVPP) in Beijing where Jia played a pivotal role in opening up Chinese paleoanthropological research to foreign scientists beginning in the late 1970s.

Jia was elected a Foreign Associate of the United States National Academy of Sciences in 1994.

His cremated remains are interred behind the museum at the Zhoukoudian site alongside those of his colleagues, Pei Wenzhong and Yang Zhongjian.

== Selected bibliography ==
- Early Man in China
- The Story of Peking Man
