= 1941 in archaeology =

Below are notable events in archaeology that occurred in 1941.

== Explorations ==
- First Gujarat prehistoric expedition (continues to 1942).

== Excavations ==
- June 19 - Mikhail M. Gerasimov opens Tamerlane's tomb.
- Excavations at Olmec site of La Venta by Matthew Stirling begin.
- Excavations at Arikamedu (Podouké) by the Société de l'histoire de l'Inde française begin (continue to 1945).
- Excavations at Baiae, Italy, begin.
- Excavations at Fulda.

== Publications ==
- Father Alberto Maria de Agostini becomes the first to write about Cueva de las Manos.

== Finds ==
- September - Remains of Roman villa at Brantingham in the East Riding of Yorkshire, England.

== Miscellaneous ==
- September 27 - A Vichy France law promulgated by Jérôme Carcopino makes buried archaeological relics state property.
- The bulk of the finds from the 1927-1937 excavations of Peking Man Site in Zhoukoudian, China are lost, never to be recovered, while being transported to safety.

== Births ==
- July 8: Martin Carver, English archaeologist of early medieval Britain
- August 5: Ina Plug, née Post, Dutch-born zooarchaeologist
- December 16: Kent R. Weeks, American Egyptologist

== Deaths ==
- July 11: Arthur Evans, English archaeologist of Minoan civilisation
