= 1923 in archaeology =

Below are notable events in archaeology that occurred in 1923.

== Explorations ==
- May 5: The Synagogue of Tomar in Portugal is purchased by scholar Samuel Schwarz for the purposes of excavation, restoration and preservation.
- Expedition under Neil Merton Judd to collect dendrochronological specimens in order to date habitation of Chaco Canyon.
- Exploration of Tasghîmût fortress in Morocco by Henri Basset and Henri Terrasse begins.

== Excavations ==
- February 16: Howard Carter opens the inner chamber of Tutankhamun's tomb.
- Peking Man Site at Zhoukoudian, China is excavated a second time by Otto Zdansky under the supervision of Johan Gunnar Andersson.
- New excavations at Viroconium (Wroxeter) in England begin (continue to 1927).

== Finds ==
- July 13: An American Museum of Natural History expedition to Mongolia under Roy Chapman Andrews is the first in the world to discover fossil dinosaur eggs. Initially thought to belong to the ceratopsian Protoceratops, they will be determined in 1995 actually to belong to the theropod Oviraptor.
- Material unearthed by Otto Zdansky's excavations at Peking Man Site in Zhoukoudian, China will eventually yield two human molars, but these finds are not announced until 1926.
- Copper Bull from Leonard Woolley's excavations at Ur.
- Bronze Age hoard found in Huelva harbour.
- A decapitated 7th-century Saxon man is excavated from the prehistoric Stonehenge site in England.
- Aphrodite of Rhodes statue in Rhodes (then part of Italy).

== Publications ==
- O. G. S. Crawford - "Air Survey and Archaeology", The Geographical Journal (May).
- Cyril Fox - The Archaeology of the Cambridge Region.
- Ralph Linton - The Material Culture of the Marquesas Islands.

== Deaths ==
- February 15 - Charles Simon Clermont-Ganneau, French Orientalist (b. 1846)
- April 5 - George Herbert, 5th Earl of Carnarvon, British Egyptological excavation sponsor (b. 1866).
