= 1845 in archaeology =

Below are notable events in archaeology that occurred in 1845.

== Events ==
- February 7: In the British Museum, a drunken visitor smashes the Portland Vase which takes John Doubleday months to repair.

== Explorations ==
- E. G. Squier and E. H. Davis begin one of the first American scientific archaeological studies, exploring the remains of the prehistoric mound builders of Ohio, leading to the publication of the landmark Ancient Monuments of the Mississippi Valley three years later.

== Excavations ==
- Austen Henry Layard begins excavating the Assyrian sites of Nimrud and Nineveh, lasting until 1851.
- Early excavation work at Ephesus

== Finds ==
- Austen Henry Layard finds first group of Nimrud ivories.
- The existence of the Lycurgus Cup, a piece of glassware demonstrating 4th century AD Roman technology, is reported.
- Approximate date: When the Rhine is blasted near Bingen am Rhein to deepen and remove rocks, Roman-era iron weapons are dredged from the river bed.

== Publications ==
- Jean-François Champollion's Monuments de l'Égypte et de la Nubie is published posthumously.

== Births ==
- March 20: Lucy Wright Mitchell, American archaeologist (d. 1888)
- June 16: Heinrich Dressel, German archaeologist (d. 1920)
- August 25: Ernest Volk, German archaeologist (d. 1919)
- September 25: Archibald Sayce, English Assyriologist (d. 1933)

== See also ==
- Ancient Egypt / Egyptology
