= 1936 in science =

The year 1936 in science and technology involved some significant events, listed below.

== Chemistry ==
- February 4 – Radium E (bismuth-210) becomes the first radioactive element to be made synthetically.
- December 23 – The first nerve agent, Tabun, is discovered (accidentally) by a research team headed by Dr Gerhard Schrader of IG Farben in Germany.

== Computer science ==
- May 28 – Alan Turing's paper "On Computable Numbers" is received by the London Mathematical Society for publication, introducing the concept of the theoretical "a[utomatic]-machine" or Turing machine. Its formal publication is on November 12.
- Rózsa Péter presents a paper entitled "Über rekursive Funktionen der zweite Stufe" to the International Congress of Mathematicians in Oslo, helping to found the modern field of recursive function theory.

== Earth sciences ==
- Inge Lehmann argues that the Earth's molten interior has a solid inner core.

== History of science and technology ==
- Economist John Maynard Keynes buys a trunk of Isaac Newton's papers at auction.

== Mathematics ==
- March – Alonzo Church's "A Note on the Entscheidungsproblem" is published.
- Dutch mathematician Cornelis Simon Meijer introduces the Meijer G-function.

== Paleontology ==
- First remains of the small Late Triassic South American dinosaur Staurikosaurus are found by Llewellyn Ivor Price in Brazil, the first dinosaur to be discovered there.

== Physics ==
- The muon is discovered by Seth Neddermeyer and Carl D. Anderson at California Institute of Technology.

== Physiology and medicine ==
- July 4 – First publication recognizing stress as a biological condition.
- December 7 – Streptococcous meningitis (a condition previously 99% fatal) is successfully treated for the first time with a sulfonamide.
- American researcher Thomas Francis Jr. isolates influenza B virus. Also this year, Australian Macfarlane Burnet discovers that Orthomyxoviridae can be grown in embryonated hens’ eggs.
- António Egas Moniz publishes his first report of performing a prefrontal leukotomy on a human patient.
- Guido Fanconi describes a connection between celiac disease, cystic fibrosis of the pancreas and bronchiectasis.
- Harry Himsworth distinguishes the two principal types of diabetes.

== Psychology ==
- Sherif's experiment on conformity.

== Technology ==
- June 26 – Focke-Wulf Fw 61, the first fully controllable helicopter, makes its first flight.
- November 3 – The world's first regular daily high-definition (at this time defined as at least 200 lines) television broadcast service is begun by the British Broadcasting Corporation from Alexandra Palace in London (following test transmissions since August). The service initially alternates on a weekly basis between John Logie Baird's 240-line electromechanical system and the Marconi–EMI all-electronic 405-line television system.

== Zoology ==
- September 7 – Death of the last recorded thylacine, in Hobart Zoo.
- November 9 – American explorer Ruth Harkness encounters and captures in China a live giant panda, a cub named Su Lin, the first to enter the United States.

== Awards ==
- Fields Prize in Mathematics (first award): Lars Ahlfors and Jesse Douglas
- Nobel Prizes
  - Physics – Victor Franz Hess, Carl David Anderson
  - Chemistry – Peter Debye
  - Medicine – Sir Henry Hallett Dale, Otto Loewi

== Births ==
- January 8 – Robert May, Australian-born Government Chief Scientific Adviser (United Kingdom) (died 2020).
- January 10
  - Walter Bodmer, German-born British human geneticist.
  - Robert Wilson, American physicist and radio astronomer.
- January 27 – Barry Barish, American gravitational physicist, Nobel Prize winner.
- March 16 – Raymond Vahan Damadian, Armenian-American MRI practitioner.
- March 24 – David Suzuki, Canadian geneticist and populariser of science.
- April 1 – Abdul Qadeer Khan (died 2021), Pakistani nuclear physicist.
- April 17 – Meemann Chang, Chinese paleontologist.
- June 29 – Leon O. Chua, American electrical engineer and computer scientist.
- August 1 – W. D. Hamilton (died 2000), English evolutionary biologist, widely recognised as one of the greatest evolutionary theorists of the 20th century.
- August 17 – Margaret Hamilton (died 2026), American computer scientist, Presidential Medal of Freedom laureate.
- September 17 – Gerald Guralnik (died 2014), American physicist most famous for his co-discovery of the Higgs mechanism and Higgs boson.
- November 3 – Anatoly Mikhaylov (died 2026), Belarusian radiologist.
- November 25 – John Taylor, English inventor.
- November 30 – Eric Walter Elst (died 2022), Belgian astronomer.
- December 22 – James Burke, British historian and populariser of science.
- December 31 – Szilveszter E. Vizi, Hungarian physician, neuroscientist and pharmacologist.

== Deaths ==
- February 9 – Sir Charles Ballance (born 1856), English surgeon.
- February 27 – Ivan Pavlov (born 1849), Russian physiologist.
- April 8 – Róbert Bárány (born 1876), Austro-Hungarian-born otologist, Nobel Prize winner in medicine.
- April 9 – John Uri Lloyd (born 1849), American pharmacist and science fiction author.
- April 27 – Karl Pearson (born 1857), English mathematician.
- August 25 – Maria von Linden (born 1869), German bacteriologist and zoologist.
