= 1930 in archaeology =

Below are notable events in archaeology that occurred in 1930.

== Excavations ==
- Vere Gordon Childe completes excavations at Skara Brae (begun in 1927).
- John Garstang begins excavations at Jericho (continue to 1936).
- Francis Llewellyn Griffith excavates at Kawa (Sudan).
- Flinders Petrie begins excavations at Tall al-Ajjul (continue to 1934).

== Finds ==
- August 5 - Remains of S. A. Andrée's Arctic Balloon Expedition of 1897 discovered.
- First fragments from an ancient boat harbour found on the bank of the Suojoki river in central Finland (one boat from site later dated to 13th century).

== Publications ==
- Aleš Hrdlička - The Skeletal Remains of Early Man.

== Miscellaneous ==
- September 11 - Max Mallowan marries Agatha Christie.
- Max von Oppenheim opens a private museum of his Near Eastern archaeological finds in Berlin.
- Edwin Smith Papyrus first translated.

== Births ==
- March 25 - John M. Coles, English prehistorian (d. 2020)
- June 13 - Paul Veyne, French Roman archaeologist, historian
- September 23 - Edda Bresciani, Italian Egyptologist (d. 2020)

== See also ==
- List of years in archaeology
- 1929 in archaeology
- 1931 in archaeology
