= Otto Zdansky =

Austrian paleontologist

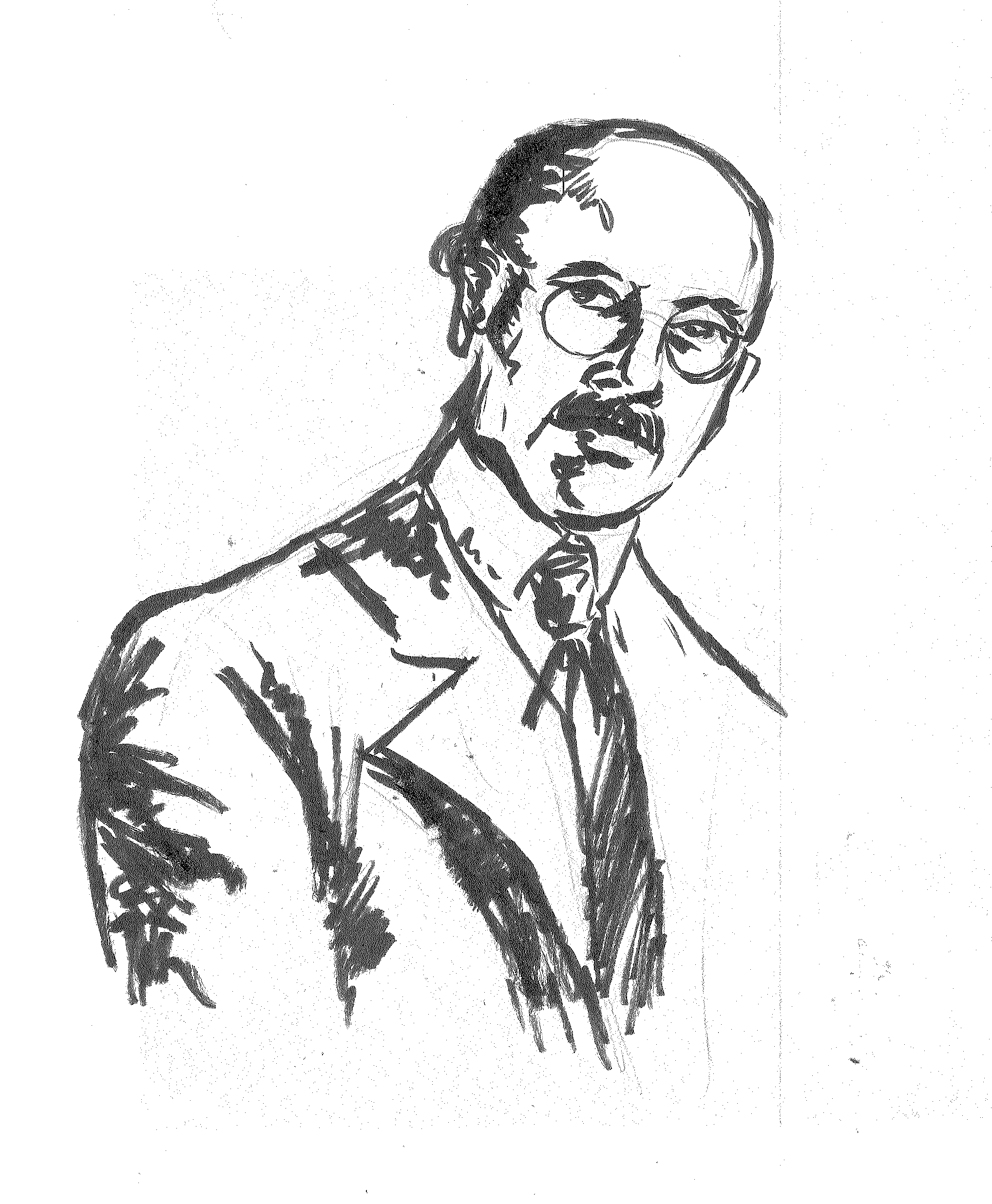
image of Otto Zdansky

Otto Karl Josef Zdansky (28 November 1894, Vienna – 26 December 1988, Uppsala) was an Austrian paleontologist.

== Biography ==
He graduated from the Philosophical School at the University of Vienna in Paleontology on 21 March 1921, with the academic degree 'Dr. phil.' (dissertation: 'Über die Temporalregion des Schildkrötenschädels').

He is best known for his work in China, where he, as an assistant to Johan Gunnar Andersson, discovered a fossil tooth of the Peking Man in 1921 at the Dragon Bone Hill, although he did not disclose it until 1926 when he published it in Nature after an analysis by Davidson Black. He is also famous for his excavations of mammal fossils in Baode County area (Pao Te Hsien), Shanxi Province. Zdansky in 1923 excavated the sauropod dinosaur Euhelopus zdanskyi named after him.
