= Aage Roussell =

Danish architect, archaeologist and historian

Dr. Aage Rousell, (27 October 1901, Copenhagen – 9 June 1972, Frederiksberg) was a Danish architect, archaeologist and historian. He was best known for his archaeological work in Greenland in the 1920s and 1930s, especially for his work on Norse settlements in medieval Greenland.

== Biography ==
Roussell was the son of Rudolf Christian Roussell (1859-1933) and wife Sidse Hansine Nielsen (1868-1941). Roussell became a student at Sankt Andreas Kollegium in Ordrup in 1919 and took a degree in philosophy from the University of Copenhagen in 1920. He was admitted to the Royal Danish Academy of Fine Arts from which he graduated in 1922.

Roussell participated in archaeological Greenland expeditions in 1926, 1930, 1932, 1934, 1935 and 1937 and an expedition to Iceland in 1939. In 1926 Roussell together with cultural historian Poul Nørlund (1888–1951) unearthed 13 skeletons at Igaliku in southern Greenland. In 1932 he returned to Greenland with Eigil Knuth (1903–1996) on an archaeological dig to excavate Viking Age sites on West Greenland's coast. Roussel, Knuth and Nørlund returned during the summer of 1934, excavating the old Norse ruins again at Igaliku. He returned again in the summer of 1937 with a Polish expedition to the Godthaab district.

Roussel became museum inspector at the National Museum of Denmark in 1937 and was from 1949 to 1971 chief inspector and leader of the medieval collection. He authored works including Farms and Churches in the Mediaeval Norse Settlement of Greenland (1941) He was later a contributor to the Arctic Encyclopedia.

During the German occupation of Denmark, Roussel participated actively in the resistance movement. As a result, in 1957 he was appointed head of the newly established Denmark's Liberation Museum 1940-1945 (Frihedsmuseet), a position he held until 1971.
