= Neil Judd =

American archaeologist

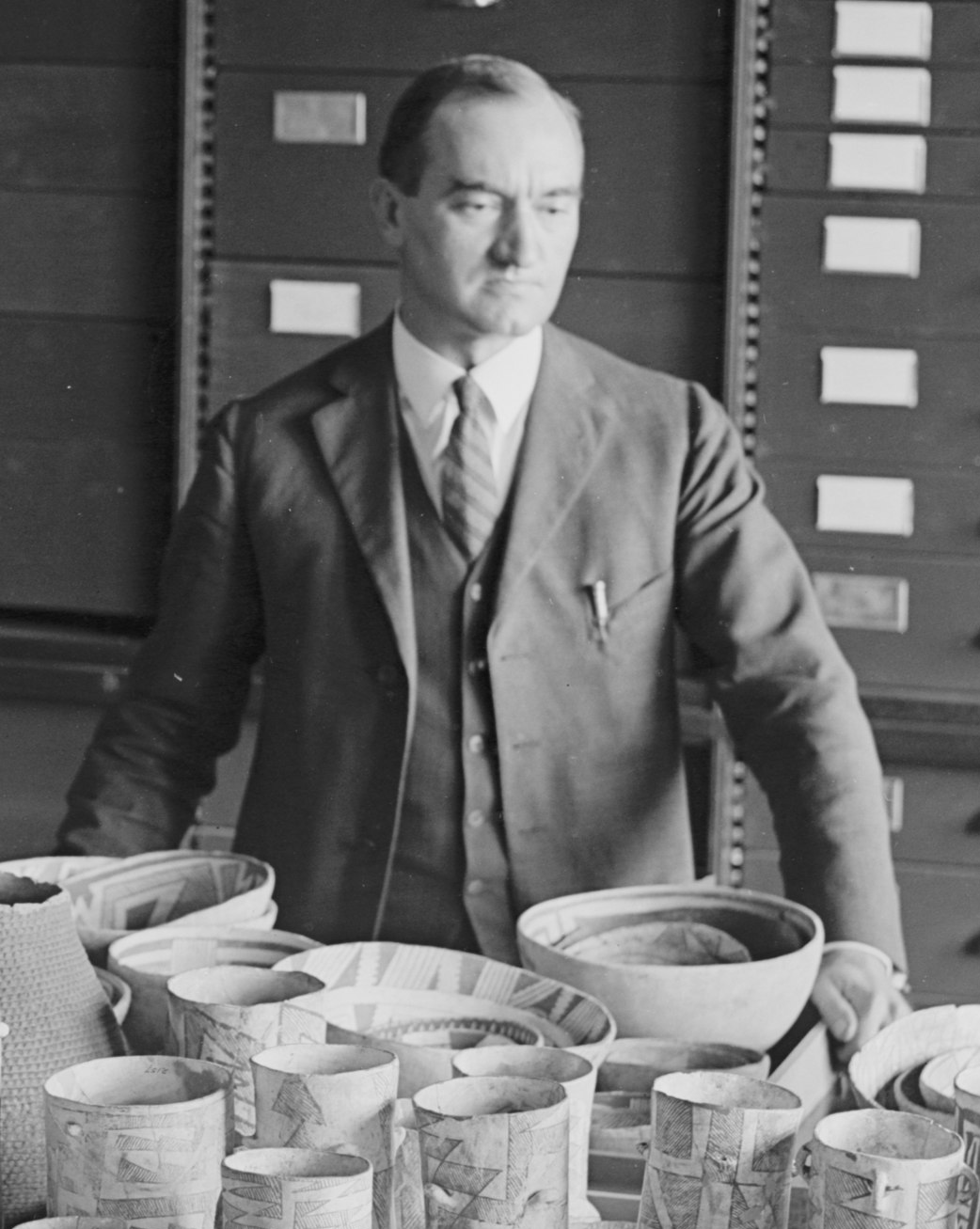
Judd in 1924

Neil Merton Judd (October 27, 1887 – December 19, 1976) was an American archaeologist who studied under both Byron Cummings and Edgar Lee Hewett. He was the long-term curator of archaeology at the United States National Museum, part of the Smithsonian Institution. He is noted for his discovery and excavation of ruins left by the Ancestral Pueblo People (also known as Anasazi) of the Four Corners area, especially sites located within Chaco Canyon, a region located within the now-arid San Juan Basin of northwestern New Mexico. He headed the first federally backed archeological expeditions sent to Chaco Canyon, excavating the key ruins of Pueblo Bonito and Pueblo del Arroyo. He was also a member of the 1909 expedition that publicized Utah's Rainbow Bridge.
