= 1924 in archaeology =

Below are notable events in archaeology that occurred in 1924.

== Excavations ==
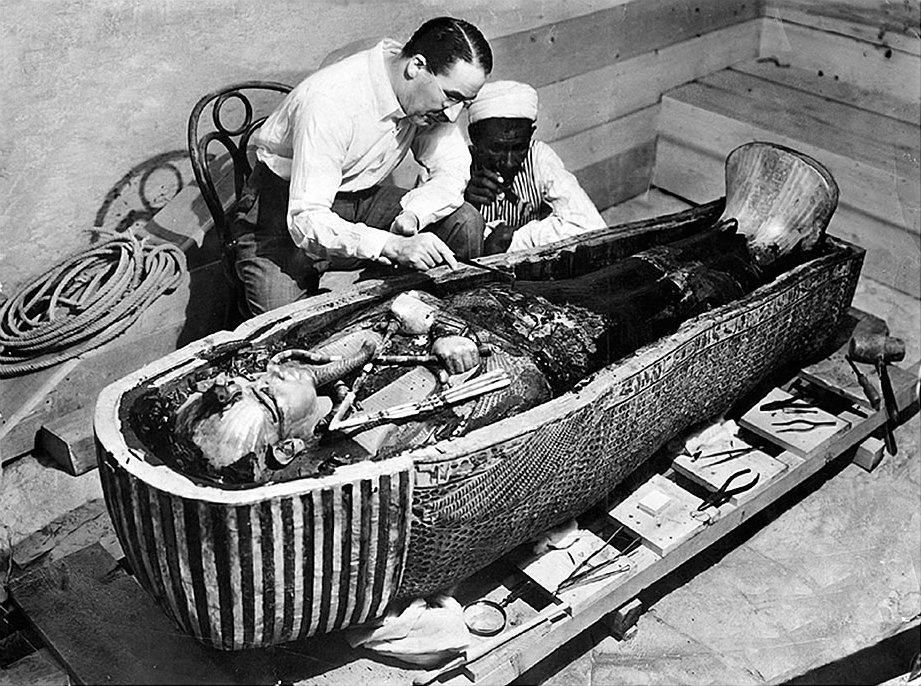
Howard Carter examining Tutankhamun's sarcophagus

- February 12 - Howard Carter opens the sarcophagus of Tutankhamun. Two days later, he closes the tomb in protest against the actions of the Egyptian authorities.
- March 1 - Discovery and subsequent start of excavations at Glozel.
- Work at Dolní Věstonice in Moravia begins under direction of Karel Absolon.
- 20-year project at Chichen Itza by the Carnegie Institution and Harvard University begins under direction of Sylvanus G. Morley.
- Excavations at Qatna by Robert du Mesnil du Buisson begin.
- Excavation of Indus Valley Civilisation site at Mohenjo-daro by Kashinath Narayan Dikshit (following survey by M. S. Vats) begins.

== Publications ==
- Francis Haverfield - The Roman Occupation of Britain, being six Ford Lectures (published posthumously).
- Alfred V. Kidder - An Introduction to the Study of Southwestern Archaeology.

== Finds ==
- The Beeston Tor Hoard, an Anglo-Saxon jewellery and coin hoard, discovered at Beeston Tor in Staffordshire, England.
- Bab edh-Dhra discovered.

== Miscellaneous ==
- Alexander Keiller purchases Windmill Hill, Avebury.
- Francis Llewellyn Griffith appointed first professor of Egyptology in the University of Oxford.
- The Nefertiti Bust (excavated in 1912) is first displayed to the public, as part of the Egyptian Museum of Berlin.
- Storms sweep away a portion of the Neolithic settlement at Skara Brae on Mainland, Orkney (Scotland).

== Births ==
- Elisabeth Munksgaard, Danish prehistorian (died 1997)

== Deaths ==
- June 14 - Jacques de Morgan, French archaeologist (born 1857)
