= 1926 in archaeology =

Below are notable events in archaeology that occurred in 1926.

== Explorations ==
- February: Thomas Gann visits the Maya ruin of Coba, and publishes the first first-hand description of the site later in the year.
- Enrique Juan Palacios makes detailed description of Chinkultic.
- Matthew Stirling explores New Guinea (through 1929).
- Leo Frobenius makes the first detailed survey of the central Eastern Desert of Egypt.
- First survey at Tel Hazor made by John Garstang.
- Louis and Mary Leakey discover the Neolithic site at Hyrax Hill, Kenya.

== Excavations ==
- British Museum-sponsored excavations at Lubaantun under T. A. Joyce.
- Uaxactun project by Carnegie Institution led by Oliver Ricketson begins.
- Alexander Keiller and Harold St George Gray excavate Windmill Hill, Avebury, in England (continues to 1929).
- Col. William Hawley concludes work (begun in 1919) at Stonehenge in England, including investigation of the Aubrey holes.
- Roman amphitheatre at Isca Augusta near Caerleon in South Wales excavated by Victor Erle Nash-Williams.
- Pierre Teilhard de Chardin joins the ongoing excavations of the Peking Man Site at Zhoukoudian, China, as an advisor.
- Aage Roussell and Poul Nørlund unearth 13 skeletons at Igaliku in Greenland.
- Hilbre Islands.

== Publications ==
- Nils Åberg - The Anglo-Saxons in England during the early centuries after the invasion.
- V. Gordon Childe - The Aryans: a Study of Indo-European Origins.

== Finds ==
- October: Johan Gunnar Andersson announces the discovery of two human molars amongst the material excavated from the Peking Man site in Zhoukoudian, China by his assistant Otto Zdansky in 1921 and 1923.
- Dorothy Garrod finds 'Gibraltar 2', fossilized components of a Neanderthal child's skull, in excavations at the Devil's Tower rock shelter on Gibraltar.
- Mayan settlement of El Mirador first discovered.
- Crofton Roman Villa discovered by bricklayers in Orpington, England.
- Leonidas sculpture discovered on the Acropolis of Sparta.
- Dancing Girl sculpture discovered in British India.
- Treasure buried by pirate Benito de Soto in 1828 is discovered at his home village in Galicia (Spain).

== Miscellaneous ==
- June - Baghdad Archaeological Museum opens.
- Sir Ellis Minns elected to the Disney Professorship of Archaeology at the University of Cambridge.

== Births ==
- August 22: Ángela Jeria, Chilean archaeologist and human rights activist (d. 2020)
- September 24: Aubrey Burl, English prehistoric archaeologist (d. 2020)
- December 12: Wang Jin, Chinese prehistoric archaeologist (d. 2020)

== Deaths ==
- July 12: Gertrude Bell, British archaeologist (b. 1868)
- December 9: Francis Joseph Bigger, Irish antiquarian (b. 1863)
