= 1925 in archaeology =

Below are notable events in archaeology that occurred in 1925.

== Excavations ==
- Kaminaljuyu Mayan site, by Manuel Gamino.
- Kültepe in Turkey, by Bedřich Hrozný.
- Excavations in Gibraltar by Dorothy Garrod begin (continue to 1926).
- October - Tin Hinan Tomb in the Sahara located and opened by Byron Khun de Prorok.
- December - Complete excavation of the Great Sphinx of Giza by Émile Baraize begins (continues to 1936).

== Publications ==
- John Beazley - Attische Vasenmaler des rotfigurigen Stils
- V. Gordon Childe - The Dawn of European Civilization.
- Aleš Hrdlička - The Old Americans.

== Finds ==
- July 13 - "Venus of Dolní Věstonice" at Dolní Věstonice in Moravia.
- October 28 - Howard Carter reveals the golden death mask of Tutenkhamun.
- Ennigaldi-Nanna's Museum at Ur is discovered by Leonard Woolley.
- "Venus of Savignano" near Savignano sul Panaro in Italy.
- "Galilee skull" in Mugharet el-Zuttiyeh.
- The Aurignacian settlement site at Breitenbach in Saxony-Anhalt is discovered by local schoolteacher E. Thiersch.
- Belgic pottery at Swarling, Kent.
- Makapansgat pebble in South Africa.

== Births ==
- January 22 - John Davies Evans, English archaeologist and academic (d. 2011)
- April 24 - Leslie Alcock, English archaeologist (d. 2006)
- November 14 - James Mellaart, British archaeologist. (d. 2012)

== Deaths ==
- February 4 - Robert Koldewey, German archaeologist (b. 1855).
