= 1932 in archaeology =

Below are notable events in archaeology that occurred in 1932.

== Explorations ==
- "Antro della Sibilla" cave discovered by Amedeo Maiuri in Italy.

== Excavations ==
- Excavations of Antioch begun by an international committee (until 1939).
- The first organized excavations, to be pursued until 1942, are started in Classical Period Smyrna by Rudolf Naumann and Selahattin Kantar, after preliminary explorations made in 1927.
- Excavations of Troy begun by Carl Blegen (until 1938).
- Brattahlid, home of Erik the Red, is excavated by Danish archaeologists in southern Greenland.
- Clovis, New Mexico, excavations reveal the tools of the Clovis culture.
- Aage Roussell and Eigil Knuth excavate old Norse sites on the west Greenland coast.
- Excavation of a 'tumulus' in the grounds of Fawley Court in England proves it to have been created in 1731.

== Publications ==
- William F. Albright - The Archaeology of Palestine and the Bible.
- R. G. Collingwood - Roman Britain.
- Cyril Fox - The Personality of Britain: its influence on inhabitant and invader in prehistoric and early historic times.
- Mary Hamilton Swindler becomes the first woman editor-in-chief of the American Journal of Archaeology

== Finds ==
- November 22: Dura-Europos synagogue (244 CE) is discovered in Syria.
- Baal with Thunderbolt or the "Baal stele" is excavated in Ugarit.
- Parts of the western quay for the Diolkos in Greece are discovered by Harold North Fowler.
- Taur Ikhbeineh is discovered in Palestine

== Miscellaneous ==
- October: Secunda nave of the Nemi ships is recovered.

== Births ==
- Patty Jo Watson, American archaeologist
