= 1934 in archaeology =

Below are notable events in archaeology that occurred in 1934.

== Explorations ==
- Maya site of Becan rediscovered by archaeologists Karl Ruppert and John Denison.

== Excavations ==
- Poznań University project at Biskupin begins, led by Józef Kostrzewski and Zdzisław Rajewski.
- Snaketown, Arizona, United States, under direction of Harold S. Galdwin.
- Kennet Avenue, by Alexander Keiller (continues to 1935).
- Maiden Castle, Dorset, by Mortimer Wheeler (continues to 1937).
- Persepolis, by Erich Schmidt (continues to 1939).
- Qafzeh cave excavations at Mount Precipice begin, led by René Neuville, uncovering remains of Hominidae dated to ca. 95,000 years BP.
- The site of the statue of the Warrior of Capestrano, accidentally discovered this year, is investigated by Giuseppe Moretti.
- Viking Age ruins at Igaliku in Greenland, by Aage Roussell, Eigil Knuth and Poul Nørlund.

== Finds ==
- 2 January: Warka Vase found at Uruk.
- The Statue of Ebih-Il is unearthed in Mari, Syria, by a French team.

== Events ==
- Russian paleophytologist V. A. Petrov sees a Latin stone inscription near Füzuli, Azerbaijan, mentioning Legio XII Fulminata; its exact location is unknown.

== Births ==
- January 1 - Khaled al-Asaad, Syrian archaeologist (d. 2015)
- May 13 - Ehud Netzer, Professor of archeology at Hebrew University known for his excavations related to Herod the Great (d. 2010)
- August 11 - Graham Connah, English-born archaeologist
- September 2 - Donald B. Redford, Canadian Egyptologist
- September 4 - Giovanni Colonna, Italian archaeologist of the Etruscan civilization

== Deaths ==
- January 29 - Albert Lythgoe, American Egyptologist, curator of the New York Metropolitan Museum (b. 1868)
- March 14 - Francis Llewellyn Griffith, British Egyptologist (b. 1862)
- March 15 - Davidson Black, Canadian paleoanthropologist (b. 1884)
- November 23 - E. A. Wallis Budge, English Egyptologist. (b. 1857)
