= 1931 in archaeology =

Below are notable events in archaeology that occurred in 1931.

== Events ==
- Athens Charter for the Restoration of Historic Monuments adopted at the First International Congress of Architects and Technicians of Historic Monuments.

== Explorations ==
- Aleš Hrdlička begins survey of Kodiak Island.

== Excavations ==
- 23 May–1 October: Discovery and subsequent excavation of human artefacts at Vogelherd Cave in Germany, including Upper Paleolithic figurines (under direction of Gustav Riek).
- Chinese prehistorian Jia Lanpo and archaeologist Bian Mienmien join the ongoing excavations at Peking Man Site in Zhoukoudian, China.
- University of Pennsylvania project at Piedras Negras, Guatemala begins (lasts to 1939).
- Excavation of tomb of Hemaka at Saqqara in Egypt is begun by Cecil Mallaby Firth.
- Tunnelling into Great Pyramid of Cholula in Mexico is begun by Ignacio Marquina.
- Alfonso Caso begins eighteen-year project at Monte Albán, Oaxaca, Mexico.
- International project at Samaria, led by John Winter Crowfoot, begins (lasts to 1935).
- Prima nave of the Nemi ships is recovered.

== Finds ==
- 9 February: The Uzziah Tablet, a 1st-century CE Aramaic funerary inscription commemorating the reburial of King Uzziah of Judah, is identified by Eleazar Sukenik in the collection of the Russian Orthodox Eleona Church on the Mount of Olives, Jerusalem.
- September: First prehistoric tool recovered from Doggerland.
- October: The Parel Relief or Parel Shiva, an important monolithic relief of the Hindu god Shiva in seven forms that is dated to the late Gupta period, in the 5th or 6th century AD is found in Parel, now a neighbourhood of Mumbai, India, where a road is being constructed.
- 29 December: Calakmul rediscovered by Cyrus L. Lundell.
- French archaeologist Henri Breuil visits the Peking Man Site at Zhoukoudian, China and confirms the presence of stone tools.
- George Florescu discovers Vlad III Dracula's tomb in Snagov Monastery.
- The remains of 450 infants and 150 dogs dated to 165 BC–150 BC are found at the Athenian Agora; the infants are subsequently found to have died from meningitis and other natural causes.
- A statue of Tyche is uncovered at Prusias ad Hypium in Turkey.
- A conch from 18000 years BP in Marsoulas Cave in the Haute-Garonne of France, demonstrated in 2021 as having been adapted by Magdalenian people as a musical instrument.

== Publications ==
- W. D. Caröe - The Importance of the Historical Buildings of Cyprus.
- C. F. C. Hawkes - "Hillforts". Antiquity 5 pp. 60–97.

== Births ==
- 15 July - Clive Cussler, American thriller writer and underwater explorer (died 2020)
- 13 September - Brian Dobson, British archaeologist notable for work on Hadrian's Wall and the Roman Army (died 2012)
- 8 October - Giovanni Garbini, Italian Orientalist (died 2017)
- 30 October - Giancarlo Ligabue, Italian paleontologist, discoverer of Ligabueino (died 2015)
- 21 November - Lewis Binford, American archaeologist known for his development of processual archaeology (died 2011)

== Deaths ==
- Alfred Maudslay, explorer, archaeologist and writer of accounts of the ruins of the Maya civilization (b. 1850)
