= 1927 in archaeology =

Below are notable events in archaeology that occurred in 1927.

== Excavations ==
- Large scale excavations begin at Peking Man Site in Zhoukoudian, China under Canadian paleoanthropologist Davidson Black with support from the Rockefeller Foundation.
- The Swedish Cyprus Expedition begins 3½ years of excavations under Einar Gjerstad.
- Excavations at Skara Brae begin under V. Gordon Childe (completed in 1930).
- Excavations at Tepe Gawra begin by an American team under Ephraim Avigdor Speiser.
- Pločnik archaeological site discovered in southern Serbia, with findings of the Vinca culture (5500 BC).
- Excavations begin at Garðar Cathedral Ruins.

== Finds ==
- Davidson Black's excavations at Peking Man Site in Zhoukoudian, China yield a human tooth that he proposed belonged to a new species that he names Sinanthropus pekinensis.
- Skeleton of Asselar man discovered by Théodore Monod and Wladimir Besnard in the Adrar des Ifoghas.
- Kents Cavern 4 maxilla found in England.
- Leonard Woolley's excavations at Ur uncover the Enheduanna calcite disc.
- "Priest-King" sculpture from the Indus Valley Civilisation found at Mohenjo-daro.
- First location of wreckage from the VOC Zuytdorp in Western Australia.
- Pilot Percy Maitland observes stone wheel-like structures across Syria and Saudi Arabia.

== Publications ==
- March - The journal Antiquity is first published in the United Kingdom. In the first two issues, the editor O. G. S. Crawford dismisses the Glozel artifacts as largely fakes.
- Alan Gardiner's Egyptian Grammar: Being an Introduction to the Study of Hieroglyphs is first published.

== Other events ==
- Work begins on draining Lake Nemi to recover the Nemi ships.
- December - An international commission declares most artefacts from the excavations at Glozel to be forgeries.

== Births ==
- January 14 - Rodolphe Kasser, Swiss philologist and archaeologist (d. 2013)
- February 10 - Bridget Allchin, British archaeologist and prehistorian (d. 2017)
- July 1 - Leo Klejn, Russian archaeologist, anthropologist and philologist (d. 2019)
- August 20 - John Boardman, British classical archaeologist and art historian (d. 2024)
- November 4 - Ivor Noël Hume, British historical archaeologist (d. 2017)

== Deaths ==
- January 21 - Gen. Sir Charles Warren, British Biblical archaeologist (born 1840)
