= Zhoukoudian =

Zhoukoudian Town 周口店镇 Chou-K'ou-Tien
- Town
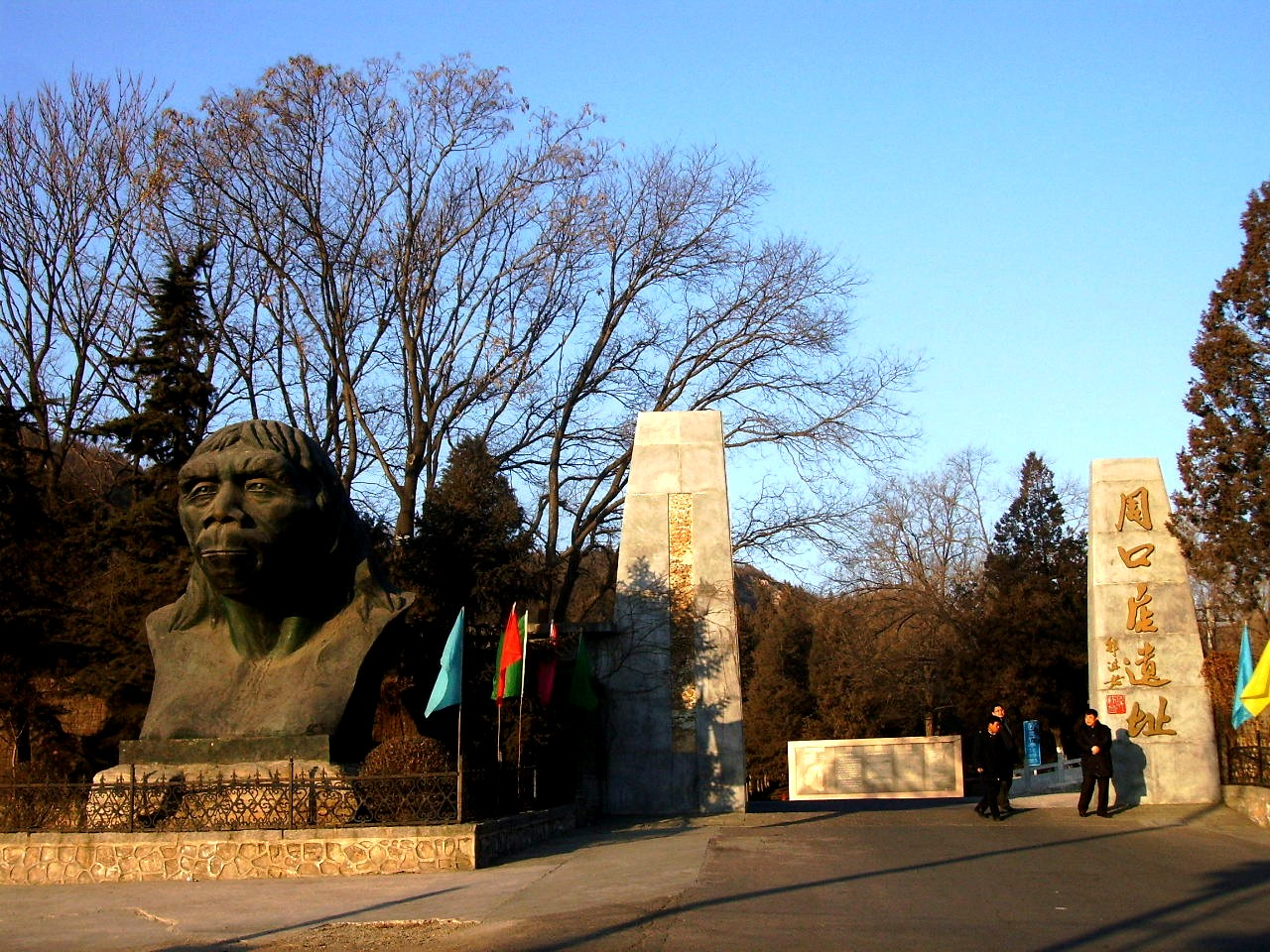
- Entrance to Zhoukoudian Peking Man Site, 2008

- Location within Beijing Location within China
- Coordinates: 39°40′47″N 115°56′46″E
- Country: China
- Municipality: Beijing
- District: Fangshan
- Village-level Divisions: 5 communities 24 villages

Area
  - Total: 121.2 km^{2} (46.8 sq mi)

Population (2020)
  - Total: 41,868
  - Density: 345.4/km^{2} (894.7/sq mi)
- Time zone: UTC+8 (China Standard)
- Postal code: 102454
- Area code: 010

Zhoukoudian Town (Chinese: 周口店镇; pinyin: Zhōukǒudiàn Zhèn) is a town on the east Fangshan District, Beijing, China. It borders Nanjiao and Fozizhuang Townships to its north, Xiangyang, Chengguan and Yingfeng Subdistricts to its east, Shilou and Hancunhe Towns to its south, and Xiayunling Town to its west. Its population was 41,868 in the 2020 census.

== History ==
Timeline of Zhoukoudian Area's History
Year	Status
1916	Part of the 2nd District of Fangshan County
1949	Part of the 7th District
1952	Formed as Zhoukoudian Microdistrict, under Jingxi Mining District
1953	Made into a township
1956	Incorporated Zhoukoucun Township
1958	Incorporated Xizhuang and Xinjie Townships. Became part of Chengguan People's Commune in May.
1961	Chengguan People's Commune renamed to Zhoukoudian People's Commune
1963	Made into a town
1989	Made into an area
1993	Incorporated Huangshandian Township and Changgouyu Area
2000	Became a town while retaining the status of an area

== Administrative divisions ==
In 2021, Zhoukoudian Area was formed by 29 subdivisions, of those 5 were communities and 24 were villages:

Administrative division code	Subdisvision names	Name transliteration	Type
110111009001	周口店	Zhoukoudian	Community
110111009002	长沟峪	Changgouyu	Community
110111009003	金巢	Jinchao	Community
110111009004	红光	Hongguang	Community
110111009005	鑫山矿	Xinshankuang	Community
110111009200	南韩继	Nanhangji	Village
110111009201	瓦井	Wajing	Village
110111009202	新街	Xinjie	Village
110111009203	大韩继	Dahanji	Village
110111009204	辛庄	Xinzhuang	Village
110111009205	周口村	Zhoukoucun	Village
110111009206	云峰寺	Yunfengsi	Village
110111009207	周口店	Zhoukoudian	Village
110111009208	娄子水	Louzishui	Village
110111009209	拴马庄	Shuanmazhuang	Village
110111009210	黄院	Huangyuan	Village
110111009211	龙宝峪	Longbaoyu	Village
110111009212	黄山店	Huangshandian	Village
110111009213	黄元寺	Huangyuansi	Village
110111009214	良各庄	Lianggezhuang	Village
110111009215	西庄	Xizhuang	Village
110111009216	车厂	Chechang	Village
110111009217	涞沥水	Lailishui	Village
110111009218	泗马沟	Simagou	Village
110111009219	北下寺	Beixiasi	Village
110111009220	葫芦棚	Hulupeng	Village
110111009221	长流水	Changliushui	Village
110111009222	山口	Shankou	Village
110111009223	官地	Guandi	Village

== Geography and Climate ==
Zhoukoudian Town is situated in the mountainous western portion of Fangshan District, approximately 50 kilometers southwest of central Beijing. The town occupies an area of 121.2 square kilometers characterized by limestone hills and cave formations that have made the region significant for paleontological research. The terrain consists of rolling hills in the north transitioning to steeper mountains in the southern sections, with elevations ranging from 80 to 400 meters above sea level.

The region experiences a typical continental monsoon climate with four distinct seasons. Summers are hot and humid with average temperatures reaching 26-28°C (79-82°F) in July and August, while winters are cold and dry with January temperatures averaging -4 to -6°C (21-25°F). Annual precipitation averages 600-650 millimeters, with approximately 75% falling during the summer months between June and August. The area's limestone geology has created numerous karst features including caves, sinkholes, and underground water channels that have been crucial to the preservation of ancient fossil remains.

The town's location along historical transportation routes between Beijing and the western mountainous regions contributed to its development as a mining and agricultural center before gaining prominence for its archaeological significance in the early 20th century.

== Landmark ==
- Zhoukoudian Peking Man Site

== See also ==
- List of township-level divisions of Beijing
