= 2015 in archaeology =

This page lists major archaeological events of 2015.

== Explorations ==
- July–September – Survey and identification of British Royal Navy submarine HMS D5 (sunk 1914 following the Raid on Yarmouth) in the North Sea.
- University of Bradford 'Europe's Lost Frontiers' project begins mapping the Palaeolithic landscapes of Doggerland beneath the North Sea.

== Excavations ==
- April 9–10 – A winter diving expedition on the Franklin expedition ship HMS Erebus, consisting of Parks Canada underwater archaeologists and Royal Canadian Navy divers, commences.
- May–October – Griffin Warrior Tomb near Pylos.
- September
  - Start of major excavations at Must Farm Bronze Age settlement in The Fens of eastern England by archaeologists from Cambridge.
  - Excavation of abandoned Bradford Park Avenue football stadium in England.
- End – Enigma Shipwrecks Project investigates the Levantine Sea.
- Excavation of Hill 20, a site in the Battle of Ypres, begins.
- 2015–2017 – Investigation of the Pictish site of Dunnicaer.
- Excavations at Craig Rhos-y-felin in the Preseli Hills of south-west Wales end (begun 2011).

== Finds ==
- January 4 – The discovery of the tomb of Khentakawess III in Abusir is announced.
- January 27 – Discovery of an extinct Homo bone under Penghu Strait in Taiwan named Penghu 1 is published.
- February 18 – Marine archaeologists and diving club members from the Israel Antiquities Authority announce that about 2,000 gold coins dating back more than 1,000 years have been discovered in Caesarea.
- Summer – Ice Age engravings dating from at least 12,000 BCE are found at Les Varines site on Jersey in the Channel Islands (part of the European continental mass when created), the earliest known art in the British Isles.
- June – Discovery of almost eight million animal mummies next to the sacred temple of Anubis is announced in Egypt, in Saqqara
- July – Discovery of two possible tunnels in Tutankhamun's tomb by Nicholas Reeves.
- October 7 – Watlington Hoard of Anglo-Saxon silver coins and other items found in Oxfordshire, England, by a metal detectorist.
- November 27 – Spanish galleon San José located off Cartagena, Colombia, in the Caribbean Sea.
- December 19 – Discovery of the wreck of a merchant ship in the Indian Ocean, thought to be the West Ridge (lost 1883).
- The lower half of one of three known statues of Egyptian pharaoh Sahure is discovered in Elkab.
- Pylos Combat Agate from Griffin Warrior Tomb excavated, but not published until 2017.
- A wood bark shield from 2300 years BP is found at Enderby, Leicestershire, in the east midlands of England.
- Wreck of British Royal Navy submarine HMS Saracen (P247) (sunk 1943) located off Corsica.

== Publications ==
- January 28 – Nature reports the dating of a modern human skull from Manot cave is the first evidence in support of the Out of Africa theory and shows modern humans living alongside Neanderthals in the Levant.

== Events ==
- March 5–8 – The ancient city sites of Nimrud, Hatra and Dur-Sharrukin in Iraq are demolished by the Islamic State of Iraq and the Levant (ISIS).
- May – The Temple of Baalshamin is destroyed by ISIS.
- June – Welsh metal detectorists discover a large Viking and Anglo-Saxon coin and jewellery hoard at Eye, Herefordshire on the English border but steal and conceal most of the find.
- June 3 – Formal confirmation that a wreck first located in the 1980s off Cape Town, South Africa, is the Portuguese São José Paquete Africa (sank 1794), the first and only confirmed find of a working slave ship sunk in transit with its human cargo aboard.
- August – The Temple of Bel in Palmyra is destroyed by ISIS.

== Deaths ==
- January 25 – Giancarlo Ligabue, Italian paleontologist, discoverer of Ligabueino (b. 1931)
- February 25 – Sheppard Frere, British archaeologist of the Roman Empire (b. 1916)
- April 9 – Margaret Rule, British maritime archaeologist (b. 1928)
- August 18 – Khaled al-Asaad, Syrian archaeologist (b. 1934)

== See also ==
- List of years in archaeology
