= 1998 in archaeology =

The year 1998 in archaeology involved some significant events.

== Explorations ==
- Location of site of Portuguese carrack Esmeralda wrecked off the coast of Oman in 1503.
- Tell Ali Muntar, a Bronze Age settlement in Palestine, is surveyed by the Gaza Research Project

== Excavations ==
- August - Excavation begins at the Belitung shipwreck, an Arab dhow wrecked off Belitung island in Indonesia about 830 AD discovered earlier in the year; it will yield the biggest single collection of Tang dynasty treasures found in one location.
- October - Excavation begins at "Seahenge" ('Holme I'), a prehistoric timber circle off Holme-next-the-Sea in England discovered earlier in the year.
- November 5–20 - British female Mark IV tank D51 Deborah, knocked out at the Battle of Cambrai (1917), at Flesquières in the north of France.
- Igeum-dong, a settlement-burial-ceremonial site of the Mumun Pottery Period in Sacheon, Korea (excavations finish in 1999).
- Excavations at Urkesh by the Deutsche Orient-Gesellschaft.
- Excavations begin at Pichvnari in Georgia by an Anglo-Georgian joint team.
- Excavations begin at Taposiris Magna in Egypt.

== Finds ==
- Bronze Age Tell es-Sakan in the State of Palestine was discovered during construction of a residential building complex.
- September - The largest Shapwick Hoard of Roman coins, including the largest number of silver denarii ever found in Britain.
- Whydah Gally, wrecked off Cape Cod, Massachusetts, in 1717, the first authenticated pirate shipwreck ever discovered.
- Artognou stone found at Tintagel Castle, Cornwall.
- World's oldest wet-rice (rice paddy) agricultural feature, c. 800 BC, at Okhyeon site, Ulsan, Korea.
- Human remains at 36 Craven Street, London, former home of Benjamin Franklin, probably dissected in the anatomy school run here by his friend, surgeon William Hewson, 1772–74.
- A floor mosaic depicting Orpheus is found at Prusias ad Hypium in Turkey.

== Publications ==
- Flemming Kaul - Ships on Bronzes: a study in Bronze Age religion and iconography.
- Ian M. Stead - The Salisbury Hoard.
- Patricia Wattenmaker - Household and State in Upper Mesopotamia: specialized economy and the social uses of goods in an early complex society.

== Other events ==
- Exhibition is held at the Harvard University Semitic Museum, Cambridge, Massachusetts: "The Sphinx and the Pyramids: One Hundred Years of American Archaeology at Giza". A model of the Giza plateau is prepared for it.

== Deaths ==
- April 18 - Linda Schele, American Mayanist (b. 1942)
- May 11 - Vronwy Hankey, British Near Eastern archaeologist (b. 1916)
- November 24 - John Chadwick, English co-decipherer of Linear B (b. 1920)
