= 1916 in archaeology =

Below are notable events in archaeology that occurred in 1916.

== Excavations ==
- Start of first excavations at Adelsö.
- In Ireland, the burial mound at Grannagh, near Ardrahan in County Galway, is first excavated by R. A. Stewart Macalister (re-excavated in 1969 by Etienne Rynne).

== Publications ==
- Grafton Elliot Smith - On the Significance of the Geographical Distribution of Mummification: a study of the migrations of peoples and the spread of certain customs and beliefs.

== Finds ==
- Uaxactun and the first known Maya inscription from the 8th Baktun of the Maya calendar are found by Sylvanus G. Morley.
- Construction work on the New York City Subway uncovers remains of a ship believed to be the Tyger, burned in 1613.

== Births ==
- January 1 - Paul Faure, French Mediterranean archaeologist (d. 2007)
- June 14 - Joe Caldwell, American archaeologist (d. 1973)
- August 23 - Sheppard Frere, British archaeologist of the Roman Empire (d. 2015)
- August 27 - Halet Çambel, Turkish archaeologist (d. 2014)
- September 15 - Vronwy Hankey, British Near Eastern archaeologist (d. 1998)
- November 3 - Rúaidhrí de Valera, Irish archaeologist (d. 1978)
- Matteo Sansone, Italian archaeologist (d. 1992)
- Probable date - Tahsin Özgüç, Turkish archaeologist (d. 2005)

== Deaths ==
- May 25 - Jane Dieulafoy, French archaeologist, explorer, novelist and journalist (b. 1851)
- October 3 - James Burgess, Scottish archaeologist active in India (b. 1832)
