= 2014 in archaeology =

The year 2014 in archaeology involved some significant events.

== Explorations ==
- January 7 - A report in the journal Nature announces that some Tsinghua Bamboo Slips represent "the world's oldest example of a multiplication table in base 10".

== Excavations ==
- Summer - First excavations at the Roman Zerzevan Castle in Turkey.
- November 6 - The recovery of the bell of the Franklin expedition's HMS Erebus is announced.
- Portions of Timișoara Fortress in Romania.
- Re-excavation of St Piran's Oratory, Perranzabuloe, Cornwall, England, begins.
- Re-excavation of the Kirkhaugh cairns.
- Excavation of the Australian Aboriginal sacred site of Juukan Gorge reveals it to be more than twice as old as previously thought.
- Excavations reveal the private dock built in 1802–04 for the yacht Peggy of Castletown, Isle of Man.

== Finds ==
- January 6 - Egyptian Minister of State for Antiquities Mohamed Ibrahim announces the positive identification of the tomb of Sobekhotep I.
- March 7 - The discovery of an alabaster statue of Princess Iset, dating from c. 1350 BC, is announced in Egypt.
- April–May - The earliest known mariner's astrolabe is recovered by David Mearns from ongoing excavation of what is believed to be the Portuguese carrack Esmeralda, wrecked in 1503 off the coast of Oman.
- April 9 - The Israel Antiquities Authority announces the discovery of a 3,300-year-old ancient Egyptian coffin in the Jezreel Valley during a natural gas pipeline excavation. The coffin is thought to have belonged to a wealthy Canaanite.
- April 19 - Egyptian Minister of State for Antiquities announces the discovery of two Twenty-sixth Dynasty tombs in Oxyrhynchus, one of which belonged to a scribe and the other one to a major clerical family.
- April 28 - Egyptian Minister of State for Antiquities announces the discovery of at least 50 mummies in the tomb KV40.
- May 7 - The discovery of a 5,600-year-old preserved tomb and mummy predating the First Dynasty of Egypt, at Nekhen, is announced by the Egyptian Minister of State for Antiquities.
- June 3 - The discovery of a 5,000-year-old pair of woollen riding trousers in China is announced.
- July 4 - The discovery of more than 150 burials in the Atacama Desert belonging to a previously unknown culture is announced. The findings are dated to between the 4th-7th century AD and indicate that the area was inhabited before the expansion of the Tiwanaku culture.
- July 7 - The discovery of 26 Roman/late Iron Age coins probably of the Corieltauvi in a Dovedale cave in the Peak District of England is announced.
- September 9 - A ship of Franklin's lost expedition is located, later announced as the flagship, HMS Erebus.
- September 21 - The Wold Newton Hoard, containing 1,857 Roman coins, is found by metal detectorist David Blakely in a field near Wold Newton in the East Riding of Yorkshire.
- September - Galloway Hoard found by Derek McLennan, a metal detectorist. The hoard was buried in the early 10th century and includes more than 100 items of gold and silver.
- October - Cave paintings in Pettakere Cave at Maros on Sulawesi are dated as being approximately 40,000 years old, it is announced; one of a hand is 39,900 years old, making it "the oldest hand stencil in the world". Dr. Maxime Aubert, of Griffith University, Queensland, Australia, adds: "Next to it is a pig that has a minimum age of 35,400 years old, and this is one of the oldest figurative depictions in the world, if not the oldest one."
- November 24 - Discovery of SS Ventnor, sunk off New Zealand in 1902, is reported.
- December - The Winfarthing pendant, a gold and garnet 7th century disc brooch, is found by landscape archaeology student, Tom Lucking, near Diss, Norfolk.
- December 18 - The discovery of a large British Iron Age and Anglian square barrow cemetery at Pocklington in the East Riding of Yorkshire, England, in a rescue archaeology excavation is announced.
- December 21 - The Lenborough Hoard, a lead container of 5,251 mint-condition silver coins from the reigns of Æthelred the Unready and Cnut the Great is found in Buckinghamshire, England, by a metal detectorist.
- December 28 - An underground city estimated to be around 5,000 years old is discovered in Turkey.
- Undated - An 8th century ski is found on Digervarden in Norway.

== Publications ==
- Paul Bahn (ed.) - The History of Archaeology: an introduction.
- Beth Laura O'Leary and P. J. Capelotti (ed.) - Archaeology and Heritage of the Human Movement into Space.

== Events ==
- Military destruction of Tell Qarqur in Syria begins.
- Osteological analysis of the skeleton of the Birka female Viking warrior excavated on the Swedish island of Björkö in 1878 suggests it may not be male.

== Deaths ==
- January 12 - Halet Çambel, Turkish archaeologist (b. 1916)
- February 22 - Richard Daugherty, American archaeologist (b. 1922)
- February 28 - Jerzy Kolendo, Polish archaeologist (b. 1933)

== See also ==
- List of years in archaeology
