= Sharon Stocker =

American archaeologist

Sharon R. Stocker
- Born: La Grange, Illinois
- Education: Denison University; University of Illinois at Chicago; University of Cincinnati
- Known for: Discovery of Griffin Warrior Tomb and Pylos Combat Agate
- Spouse: Jack L. Davis
- Scientific career
- Fields: Classical archaeology
- Institutions: University of Cincinnati
- Thesis: "Illyrian Apollonia: Toward a New Ktisis and Development History of the Colony"

Sharon (Shari) Stocker is an American archaeologist who is best known, along with her husband, archaeologist Jack L. Davis, for leading an international team of researchers who discovered a previously undisturbed tomb of a Bronze Age warrior in southwest Greece. The 3500 year old intact grave was named the Griffin Warrior Tomb by the research team during the initial excavation in May 2015.

Stocker is currently a senior research associate and the director of publications for the University of Cincinnati's excavations at the Palace of Nestor in Greece. She was a co-director of archaeological surveys in the ancient cities of Epidamnos and Apollonia, Albania. Her professional expertise "lies in the analysis of ceramics of the Middle Bronze Age and Early Greek colonization in the Western Mediterranean." In 2021 Stocker was named a Commander of the Order of the Phoenix (Greece) by the Hellenic Republic.

== Education ==
Stocker majored in history and classics at Denison University (BA 1981). She did post graduate study in Classics at the University of Cincinnati (1982–1984) and at the University of Illinois at Chicago (1991–1993). From 1993 to 2009, Stocker furthered her studies at the University of Cincinnati, earning an MA in Classics in 1996 and a PhD in Greek Prehistory in 2009.

== Griffin Warrior Tomb ==
The Griffin Warrior Tomb was discovered in May 2015 by an international team of researchers, led by Stocker and Davis, and sponsored by the University of Cincinnati. In October, 2015, Greece's Ministry of Culture announced the discovery: "More than 1,400 artifacts were uncovered, including a three-foot long bronze sword with an ivory hilt, four solid gold rings -- more than found at any single burial elsewhere in Greece -- and ivory combs and carvings, depicting griffons and a lion".

== Pylos Combat Agate ==
Two years after the initial excavation of the Griffin Warrior Tomb, the University of Cincinnati team made another remarkable discovery which has become the most significant find to date: an intricately carved sealstone about 1.4 inches in length with details of the artifact visible only under magnification. Known as the Pylos Combat Agate, the seal was encrusted in limestone, and it took researchers over a year to clean and restore it.

== Selected publications ==
- Stocker, Sharon R.; Davis, Jack L. (2016). "The Lord of the Gold Rings: The Griffin Warrior of Pylos". Hesperia. 85 (4): 627–655. doi:10.2972/hesperia.85.4.0627. JSTOR 10.2972/hesperia.85.4.0627. S2CID 164287861.
- Stocker, Sharon R.; Davis, Jack L. (2013). "The Medieval Deposit from the Northeast Gateway at the Palace of Nestor". Hesperia. 82 (4): 673–731. doi:10.2972/hesperia.82.4.0673. JSTOR 10.2972/hesperia.82.4.0673. S2CID 165184507.
- Isaakidou, Valasia; Halstead, Paul; Davis, Jack L.; Stocker, Sharon R. (2015). "Burnt animal sacrifice at the Mycenaean 'Palace of Nestor', Pylos". Antiquity. 76 (291): 86–92. doi:10.1017/S0003598X00089833. S2CID 161718832.
- Stocker, Sharon R.; Gerkie, Tammie; Davis, Jack L. (2006). "Sourcing Volcanic Millstones from Greco-Roman Sites in Albania". Journal of Field Archaeology. 31 (2): 137–146. doi:10.1179/009346906791072034. JSTOR 40024953. S2CID 129905802.
- Stocker, Sharon R.; Davis, Jack L. (2004). "Animal Sacrifice, Archives, and Feasting at the Palace of Nestor". Hesperia. 73 (2): 179–195. doi:10.2972/hesp.2004.73.2.179. JSTOR 4134892. S2CID 192207685.

== See also ==
- Minoan seals
