= Matteo Sansone =

Matteo Sansone may refer to:

- Matteo Sansone (musicologist), Italian musicologist
- Matteo Sansone (archaeologist) (1916–1992), Italian archaeologist
