= 1851 in archaeology =

Below are notable events in archaeology that occurred in 1851.

== Excavations ==
- Some excavation at Susa by William Loftus, who identifies the location.

== Publications ==
- J. Collingwood Bruce's The Roman Wall: a historical, topographical, and descriptive account of the barrier of the lower isthmus, extending from the Tyne to the Solway.
- Mariano Eduardo de Rivero y Ustáriz and Johann Jakob von Tschudi's Antigüedades peruanas, published in Vienna, the first scientific work on Peruvian archaeology.
- Daniel Wilson's The Archaeology and Prehistoric Annals of Scotland, which introduces the word prehistoric into the English archaeological vocabulary.

== Miscellaneous ==
- John Disney endows the Disney Professorship of Archaeology in the University of Cambridge, first held by John Howard Marsden

== Births ==
- 29 June: Jane Dieulafoy, born Jeanne Magre, French archaeologist, excavator of Susa, explorer, novelist and journalist (d. 1916)
- 8 July: Arthur Evans, English archaeologist best known for discovering the palace of Knossos on Crete (d. 1941)
