= Winfarthing =

Village in Norfolk, England

Coordinates: 52°25′43″N 1°05′57″E

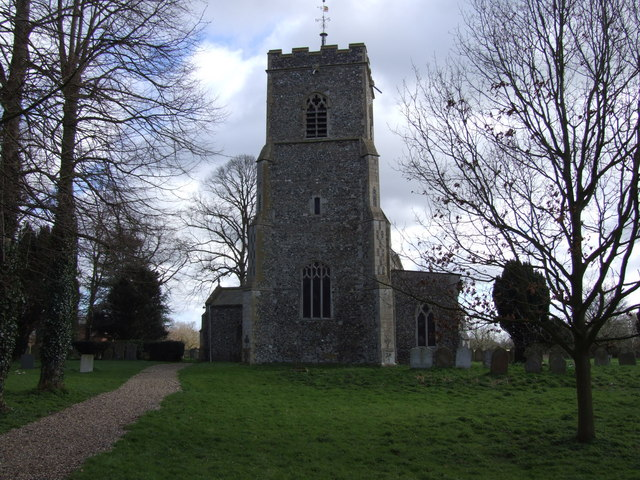
- Church of Saint Mary the Virgin, Winfarthing

- Location within Norfolk
- Area: 10.80 km^{2} (4.17 sq mi)
- Population: 503 (2011)
  - Density: 47/km^{2} (120/sq mi)
- OS grid reference: TM108857
- Civil parish: Winfarthing
- District: South Norfolk
- Shire county: Norfolk
- Region: East
- Country: England
- Sovereign state: United Kingdom
- Post town: DISS
- Postcode district: IP22
- Dialling code: 01379
- Police: Norfolk
- Fire: Norfolk
- Ambulance: East of England

Winfarthing is a village and civil parish in the English county of Norfolk. It is located 4 miles (6 km) north of the town of Diss, 12 miles (19 km) east of the town of Thetford, and 19 miles (31 km) south of the city of Norwich. The gold and garnet Anglo Saxon Winfarthing pendant was found nearby in 2014.

The civil parish has an area of 4.2 sq mi (10.8 km^{2}) and in the 2001 census had a population of 403 in 162 households, the population increasing to 503 at the 2011 Census. For the purposes of local government, the parish falls within the district of South Norfolk.

The village is the site of the grade I listed St Mary's church.

== History ==
The place-name 'Winfarthing' is first attested in the Domesday Book of 1086, where it appears as Wineferthinc. The name means "Wina's quarter part". The name of the former English coin the farthing has a similar origin, meaning "the fourth part (of a penny)".

The parish of Winfarthing was a demesne of the King until around 1189 in the reign of Henry II, when it was sold off to a private landowner. In 1600, there were 189 communicants, and by 1739, there were 50 dwelling-houses, and about 260 inhabitants in total, at which point the parish was valued for tax purposes at £924 (£172000 today).

The Anglo-Saxon Winfarthing pendant was found in a nearby field in 2014, in a woman's grave. It is made of gold with garnets, and is held in Norwich Castle Museum.
