= Lentoid =

Three-dimensional geometric shape

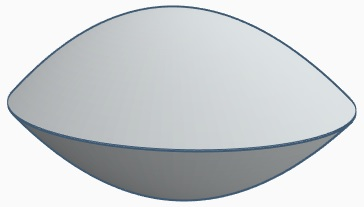
Lentoid

A lentoid is a geometric shape of a three-dimensional body, best described as a circle viewed from one direction and a convex lens viewed from every orthogonal direction. It has no strict mathematical definition, but may be described as the volume enclosed within overlapping paraboloids.

The term is most often used in describing jewelry and cellular phenomena in microbiology.

== In history ==
Since ancient times, the lentoid shape has been used to fashion jewelry and seals for identification made from a variety of gemstones and metals. In Minoan Crete, for example, Minoan seals have been found with complex carving on lentoid stones. The lentoid shape was one of the most commonly recovered seal shapes from Minoan Knossos on Crete dating to the Bronze Age, as evidenced by the finds at that Bronze Age palace.

== Gallery ==
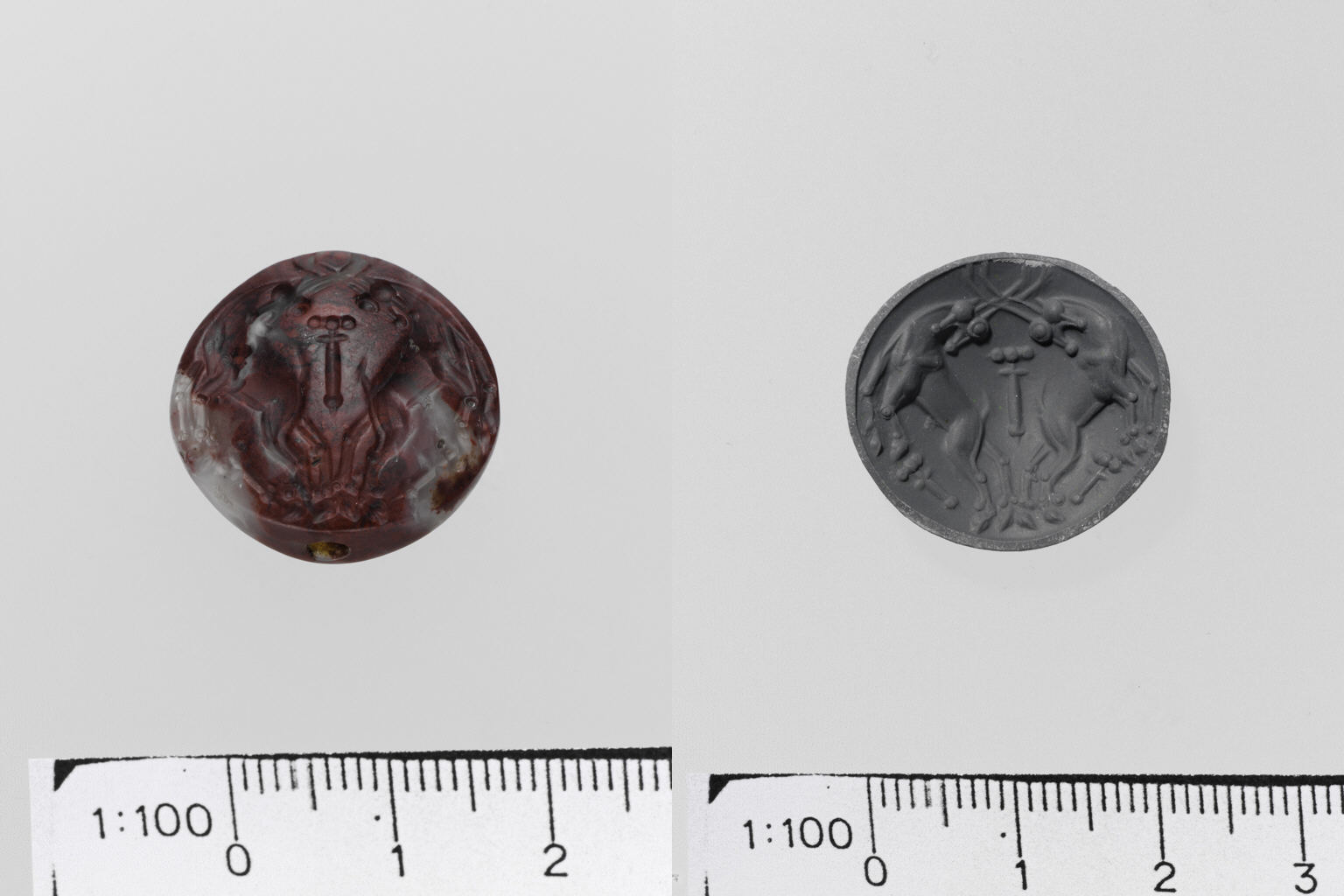
Lentoid Minoan seal in agate: seal and impression

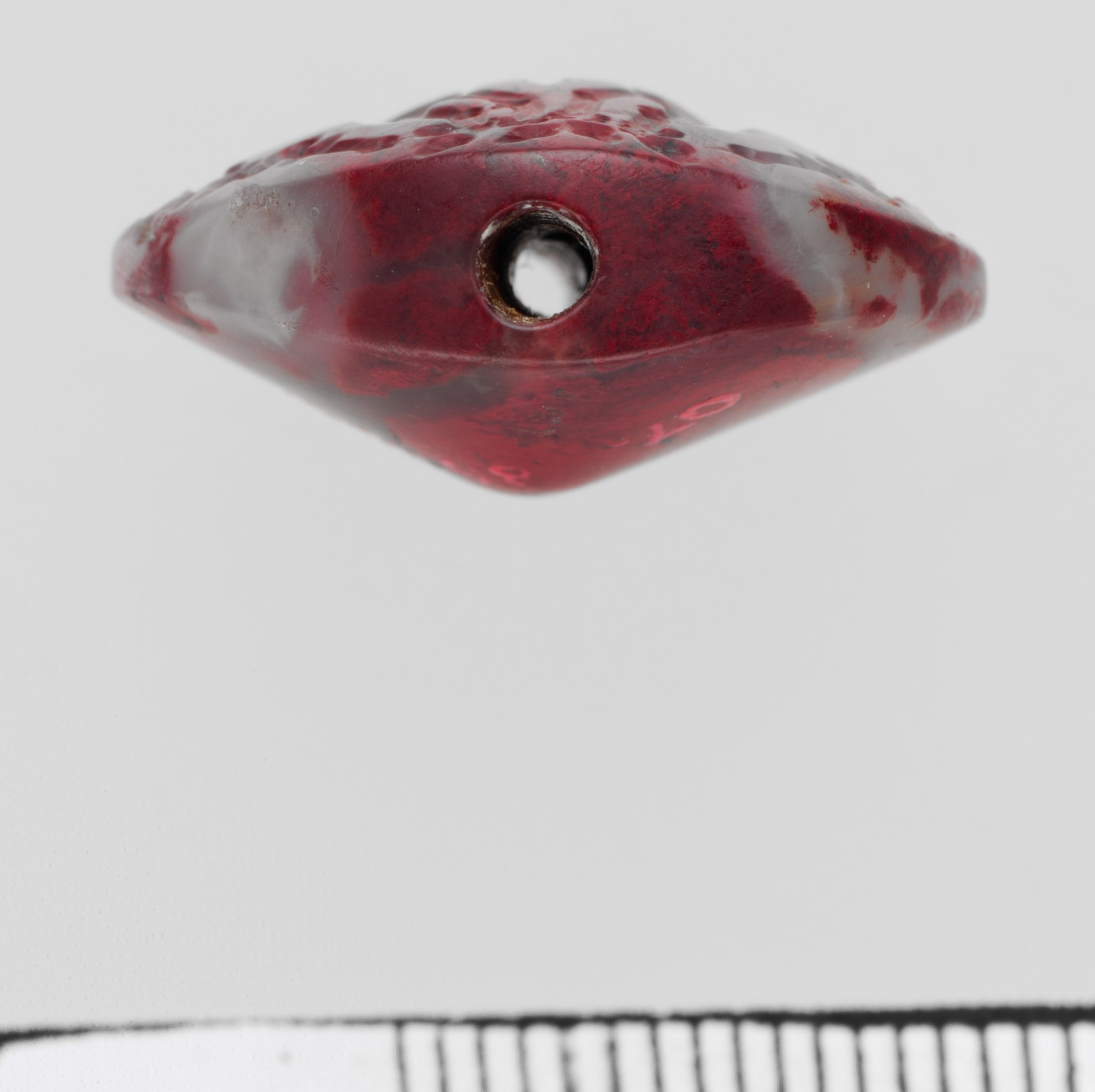
Side view of same seal

== See also ==
- Disc
- Oblate spheroid
- Spheroid
- Lists of shapes
