= Griffin Warrior Tomb =

Ancient site in Bronze Age Pylos, Greece

- Bronze Age Warrior Tomb
- Location within Greece
- 37°01′41.6″N 21°41′45.4″E
- Periods: Aegean Bronze Age
- Cultures: Minoan, Mycenaean
- Location: Pylos
- Region: Greece

Site notes
- Archaeologists: Jack Davis, Sharon Stocker
- Discovered: May 28, 2015; 11 years ago
- Website: www.griffinwarrior.org

The Griffin Warrior Tomb is a Bronze Age shaft tomb dating to around 1450 BC, near the ancient city of Pylos in Greece. The grave was discovered by a research team sponsored by the University of Cincinnati and led by husband-and-wife archaeologists Jack L. Davis and Sharon Stocker. The tomb site was excavated from May to October 2015.

During the initial six month excavation, the research team uncovered an intact adult male skeleton and excavated 1400 objects including weapons, jewels, armour and silver and gold artifacts. Since 2015, the number of artifacts recovered from the grave has reached over 3500 items, including a historically significant Minoan sealstone called the Pylos Combat Agate and four signet gold rings with detailed images from Minoan mythology.

== Background ==
The "most completely preserved of all Bronze Age palaces on the Greek mainland" is the so-called "Palace of Nestor", located near the modern town of Pylos. In 1939, archaeologist Carl Blegen, a professor of classical archaeology at the University of Cincinnati, with the cooperation of Greek archaeologist Konstantinos Kourouniotis, led an excavation to locate the palace of the famous king of Homer's Iliad.

Blegen selected a hilltop site in Messenia, called Epano Englianos, as a possible location of the ancient ruins. The excavation uncovered the remains of a number of structures, tombs and the first examples of Greek writing in Linear B. The excavation continued from 1952 to 1966, with Blegen retiring in 1957.

With questions still to be answered about the Mycenaean civilization prior to the 13th century BC, the University of Cincinnati renewed excavations at the "Palace of Nestor" in 2015, with the support of the American School of Classical Studies at Athens and the permission of the Greek Ministry of Culture. Blegen's work at Pylos is continued by Davis and Stocker, who have both worked in this area of Greece for the past 25 years.

== Initial excavation ==
The gravesite was discovered in an olive grove near the ancient Palace of Nestor, within the Bronze Age city of Pylos, in southwest Greece. The excavation leaders, Davis and Stocker, had originally planned to excavate downhill from the Palace. Due to local bureaucracy issues and an unforeseen strike, they were unable to get a permit for their desired site and were instead only given permission to dig in a neighboring olive grove.

A few spots in the olive grove were chosen for investigation, including "three stones that appeared to form a corner". On May 28, 2015, as two members of the research team started to dig, a two meter by one meter shaft revealed itself, suggesting a grave. Researchers discovered a skeleton at the bottom of the grave surrounded by various artifacts. The remains were found in a wooden coffin placed within a stone lined chamber. Items determined to be grave offerings were found inside and on top of the coffin and in the stone lined shaft. The finds consisted of jewelry, sealstones, carved ivories, combs, gold and silver goblets, and bronze weapons.

=== Identifying the Griffin Warrior ===
"Analyses of the skeleton show that this 30-something dignitary stood around 5ft. Combs found in the grave imply that he had long hair. A recent computerized facial reconstruction based on the warrior's skull, created by Lynne Schepartz and Tobias Houlton, physical anthropologists at the University of the Witwatersrand in Johannesburg, shows a broad, determined face with close-set eyes and a prominent jaw."

"So far we have no idea of the identity of this man," said Stocker—other than he was someone very important and very rich. His bones showed he had been of a robust stature—which, along with martial objects found in the grave, suggested he was a warrior—although he could also have been a priest, as many of the objects found with him had ritual significance."

Further analysis of the skeleton will enable researchers to learn more about the identity of the male skeleton. Scientific examination of his well-preserved teeth and pelvic bones may help determine his genetic background, diet and cause of death.

=== Tomb artifacts ===
- A gold box-weave chain with "sacral ivy" finials.
- A meter-long sword with a gold-coated hilt.
- A gold-hilted dagger.
- Multiple gold and silver cups.
- Carnelian, amethyst, amber, and gold beads.
- Four gold rings.
- Dozens of small, carved seals with etched depictions of combat, goddesses, reeds, altars, lions, and men jumping over bulls.
- A plaque of ivory with a representation of a griffin in a rocky landscape.
- A bronze mirror with an ivory handle.
- Thin bands of bronze (remains of the warrior's armor).
- Boar tusks, possibly from the warrior's helmet.
- A knife with a large, square blade.
- Two squashed gold cups, and a silver cup with a gold rim.
- Six silver cups.
- Bronze cups, bowls, amphora, jugs, and a basin, some trimmed with gold, some with silver trim.
- Six decorated ivory combs.

== Further excavation and analysis ==
Initially, the research team found it difficult to determine the date of burial of the tomb's inhabitant. Pottery remnants are typically used for dating purposes, but the warrior's grave contained no pottery. In the summer of 2016, further excavations in the area surrounding the gravesite unearthed pottery fragments that enabled Davis and Stocker to date the site to 1500–1450 BC. With that information, they were able to determine that the warrior lived during the end of the shaft grave period before the construction of the palatial centres in Mycenaean Greece, including the Palace of Nestor.

Researchers are currently studying the artifacts in detail, with all excavation objects remaining in Greece and their final placement to be determined by the Greek Archaeological Service. Former University of Cincinnati anthropologist Lynne Schepartz, now of the University of Witwatersrand in Johannesburg, South Africa, is studying the skeletal remains.

DNA tests and isotope analyses are also underway in the hope of learning more about the warrior's ethnic and geographic origins.

=== Gold signet rings ===
Four gold signet rings unveiled in late 2016 are engraved with intricate Minoan images and clearly indicate significant Mycenaean-Minoan cultural transfer in this era.

=== Pylos Combat Agate ===
Among the various tomb artifacts found, a small item 1.4 inches (3.6 cm) in length, and embedded in limestone was revealed after a year of cleaning to be a beautifully carved sealstone. The sealstone's image, an intricately carved combat scene can only be viewed in full detail with a photomicroscopy camera lens. "A magnifying glass may have been used to create the details on the stone", according to Stocker, but "no type of magnifying tool from this time period has ever been found."

== Interpretations ==
"'Probably not since the 1950s have we found such a rich tomb," said James C. Wright, the director of the American School of Classical Studies at Athens. The grave, in Dr. Wright's view, lies "at the date at the heart of the relationship of the mainland culture to the higher culture of Crete" and will help scholars understand how the state cultures that developed in Crete were adopted into what became the Mycenaean palace culture on the mainland.

"The palaces found at Mycene, Pylos and elsewhere on the Greek mainland have a common inspiration: All borrowed heavily from the Minoan civilization that arose on the large island of Crete, southeast of Pylos. The Minoans were culturally dominant to the Mycenaeans but were later overrun by them. How, then, did Minoan culture pass to the Mycenaeans? The warrior's grave may hold many answers. He died before the palaces began to be built, and his grave is full of artifacts made in Crete. 'This is a transformative moment in the Bronze Age," said Dr. Brogan, the director of the Institute for Aegean Prehistory Study Center for East Crete.'"

Davis and Stocker believe that the artifacts uncovered in 2015 in the 3,500-year-old grave "were symbols of his power as a ruler of the town of Pylos", located on the southwestern coast of Greece. "Whoever they are, they are the people introducing Minoan ways to the mainland and forging Mycenaean culture," Davis said.

== See also ==
- Minoan civilization – Bronze Age civilization on Crete and other Aegean Islands
- Mycenaean Greece – Late Bronze Age Greek civilization
