= Minoan seals =

Artifacts from the Minoan civilization

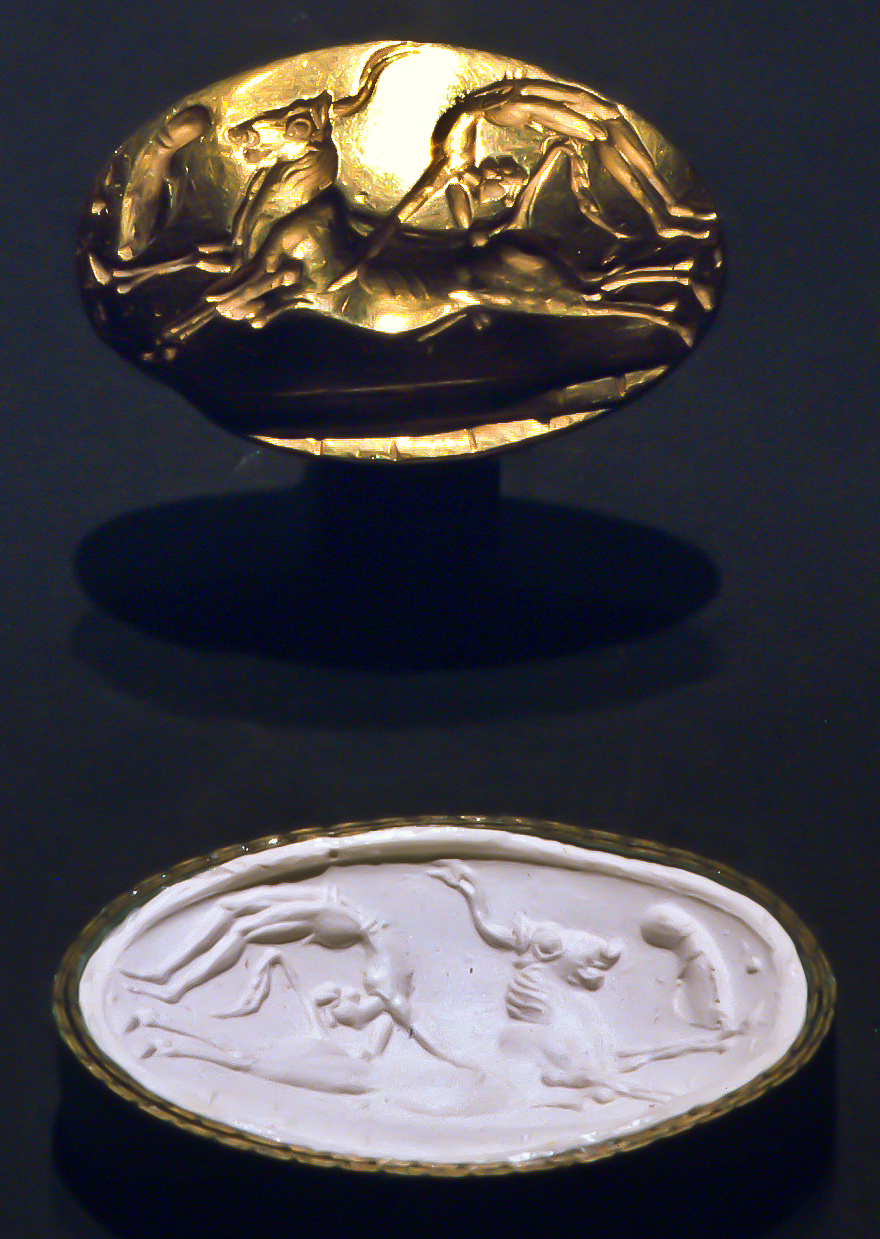
A gold signet ring and its impression. Ashmolean Museum

Minoan seals are impression seals in the form of carved gemstones and similar pieces in metal, ivory and other materials produced in the Minoan civilization. They are an important part of Minoan art, and have been found in quantity at specific sites, for example in Knossos, Malia and Phaistos. They were evidently used as a means of identifying documents and objects.

Minoan seals are of a small size, 'pocket-size', in the manner of a personal amulet. Many of the images are a similar size to a human fingernail, with a high proportion that of the nail of a little finger. They might be thought of as equivalent to the pocket-sized, 1 inch (3 cm) scaraboid seals of Ancient Egypt, which were sometimes imitated in Crete. However Minoan seals can be larger, with largest examples of many inches.

Minoan seals are the most common surviving type of Minoan art after pottery, with several thousand known, from EM II onwards, in addition to over a thousand impressions, few of which match surviving seals. Cylinder seals are common in early periods, much less so later. Seals with different shapes and multiple faces are especially common, unusually so by comparison with later and neighbouring cultures: "lentoid" ones have two faces, usually curving towards a thin circular edge, and there are many "prism" ones with three flat faces. A seal-carving workshop from MM I excavated at Malia mostly made this type; here, as throughout the surviving seals, there are wide variations in the quality of the carving. Often seals are pierced, so they can be worn around the neck or wrist on a string. Probably many early examples were in wood, and have not survived. Ivory and soft stone were the main surviving materials for early seals, the body of which were quite often formed as animals or birds. From the Middle Minoan period fast rotary drills were used, enabling harder stones to be utilized.

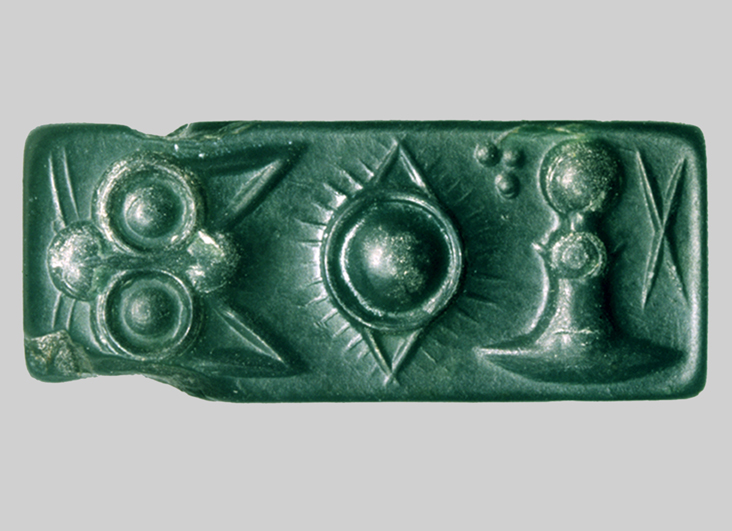
Green jasper, with Cretan hieroglyphs, 1800 BC

Later, some are extremely fine engraved gems; other seals are in gold, usually on signet rings. The subjects shown cover the full range of Minoan art. The so-called Theseus Ring was found in Athens; it is gold, with a bull-leaping scene in intaglio on the flat bezel. The Pylos Combat Agate is an exceptionally fine engraved gem, probably made in the Late Minoan, but found in a Mycenaean context. This is a common issue: Minoan art was exported around the Aegean Sea and beyond, and many finds in Mycenaean and other contexts are thought to be either made in Crete or by Cretan or Cretan-trained artists working outside Crete.

== Subjects depicted ==
Some seals are carved on more than one face, as many as eight in one case. Some have Minoan hieroglyphs. Most early seals carry geometric patterns or plant-like designs. Birds and animals, both land and marine, generally appear rather earlier than human figures. Mythological and fantastic creatures such as the griffin, sphinx and Minoan Genius also appear. Figurative designs gradually become more complicated, to include dance and goddesses. One common iconographic motif in Minoan art, especially frescoes, is bull-leaping; the example illustrated shows leapers and a bull. Other themes are varied, including for example: 'pottery and a plant'-(with 5 moon/planet crescents), 'confronted-goats', and a 'single bird'.

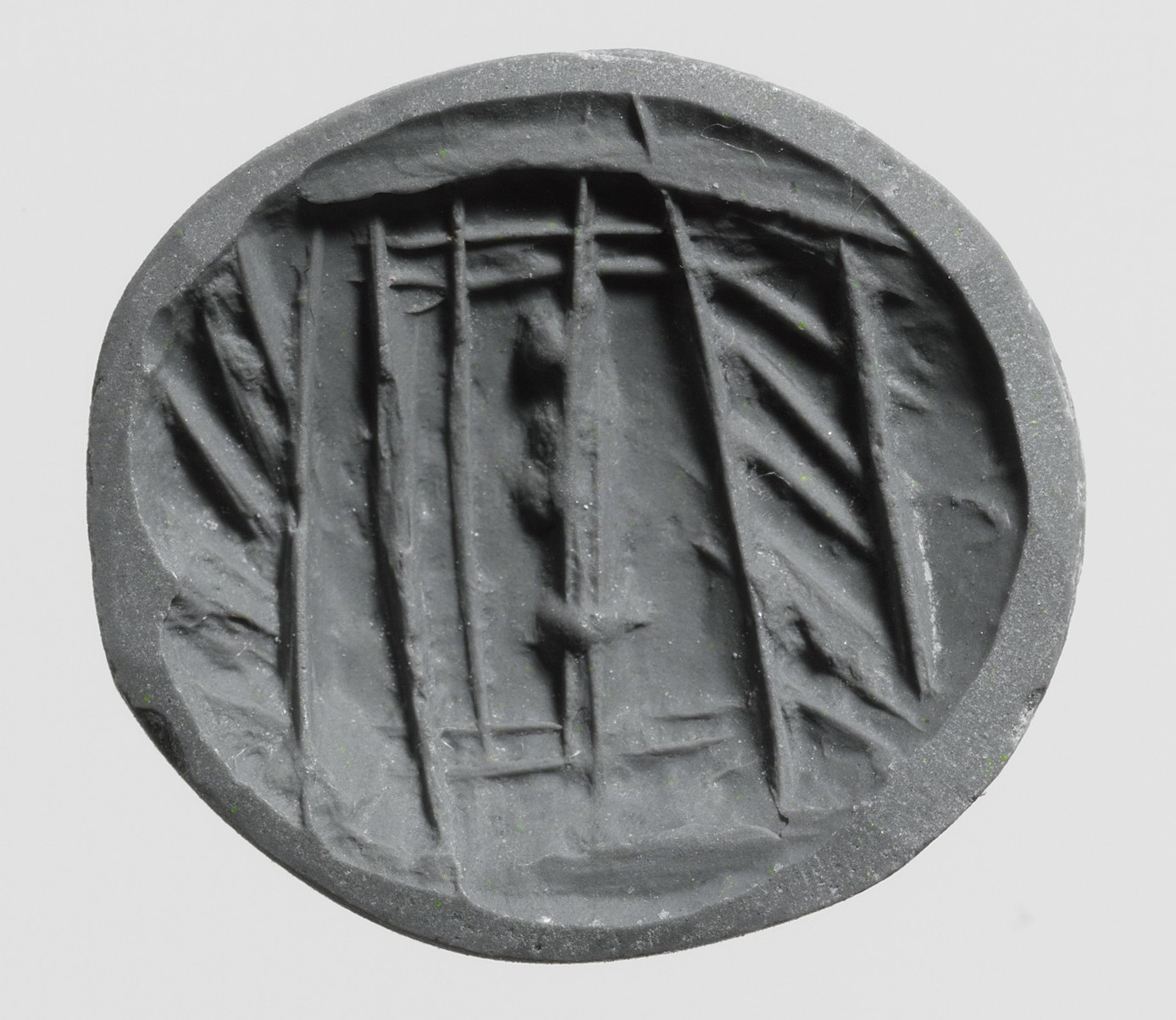
Impression of seal from Early Minoan III; designs like this are thought to represent buildings, probably rustic shrines.

In a large group of sealings from the palace at Phaistos that seem to be early MM II, or around 1800 BC, over two thirds of the nearly 300 designs are abstract patterns, some very simple, but others complicated and sophisticated. The sharp curving of bodies, typical of human bull-leaper figures, is often seen in animals in round images, though others are seen in a natural profile. Some seals seem to show their dependence on images from frescos by having a "dado" of lines or ornament beneath the main image, typical of Minoan painting.

In MM III, from c. 1700 on a class of "talismanic seals" appear, that are thought to have had a magical function. Often they are too deeply cut to be very effective in sealing, and may have been just carried as amulets. They are less often found outside Crete than other types. Their designs are typically bold and deeply cut, "executed in a brisk and time-saving technique".

What may be a regional style on large sealings from Zakros in LM I has exotic hybrid monsters such as "Eagle Ladies", a pair of breasts with wings and either a bird's head or a helmet with no head. Another has male human legs, bird's wings and a horned goat's head, and a third large breasts, the wings of a butterfly, a human head with crown and animal legs. Though "no doubt the designs had some magical import", there seems also to be a strong element of whimsical fantasy.

When metal, mostly as gold rings, was used, complex designs with many figures were possible.

== Significant archaeological finds ==
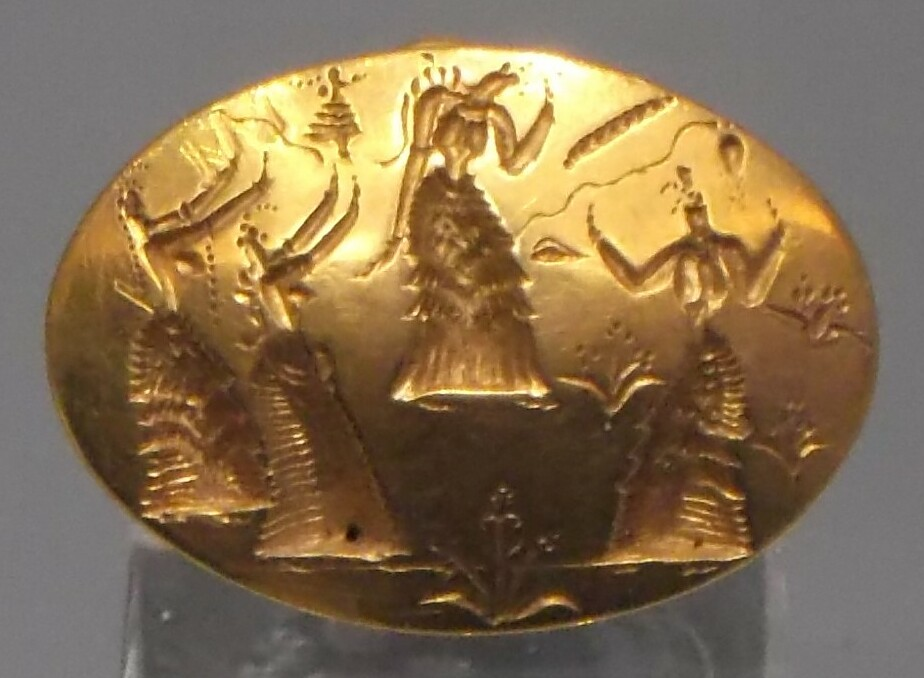
A much-discussed gold signet ring from Knossos, perhaps showing a goddess and worshippers

At Mycenae, the shaft grave circles A and B are groups of elite burials with rich grave goods that include many seals that are thought to be Minoan, certainly in terms of their tradition, and probably in terms of their place of manufacture. For Sinclair Hood, these objects (specifically those from Circle A) "raise in an acute form the related questions of how to distinguish mainland from Cretan work, and the significance of any distinction that may exist". The eight seals (three stone, five gold) found in Shaft Grave Circle A are of the large multi-figure type. Although scenes of combat and hunting predominate, all were found in the graves of women. It does not seem that seals were actually used for making impressions on the Greek mainland at this point, so these objects, usually thought to be of Minoan workmanship, were apparently treated as jewellery for women.

The tholos or beehive tomb at Vaphio (or Vapheio) near Sparta is another famous find that has generated much discussion as to the origin of many pieces; the two gold cups are now usually thought to be Cretan in the case of one, and the other Mycenaen, made to match. The 43 seals in the tomb include a variety of fine stones, and gold, and several have parallels in Cretan finds. The princely figure buried there seems to have worn them on his wrists, like a modern charm bracelet. Sinclair Hood believed that at this date "it was broadly speaking possible to classify the finer seals as being of Cretan, the more crudely engraved of mainland manufacture", but that "this criterion no longer applies after the mainland conquest of Crete c. 1450".

In 2015, an international team of archaeologists led by University of Cincinnati researchers discovered the Griffin Warrior Tomb, an undisturbed Bronze Age warrior's tomb at Pylos in southwestern Greece. The grave contained more than 50 gold or hardstone seal-stones, with intricate carvings in Minoan style showing goddesses, altars, reeds, lions and bulls, some with bull-jumpers soaring over the bull's horns – all in Minoan style and probably made in Crete. The Pylos Combat Agate is the most remarkable of these.

== Gallery ==
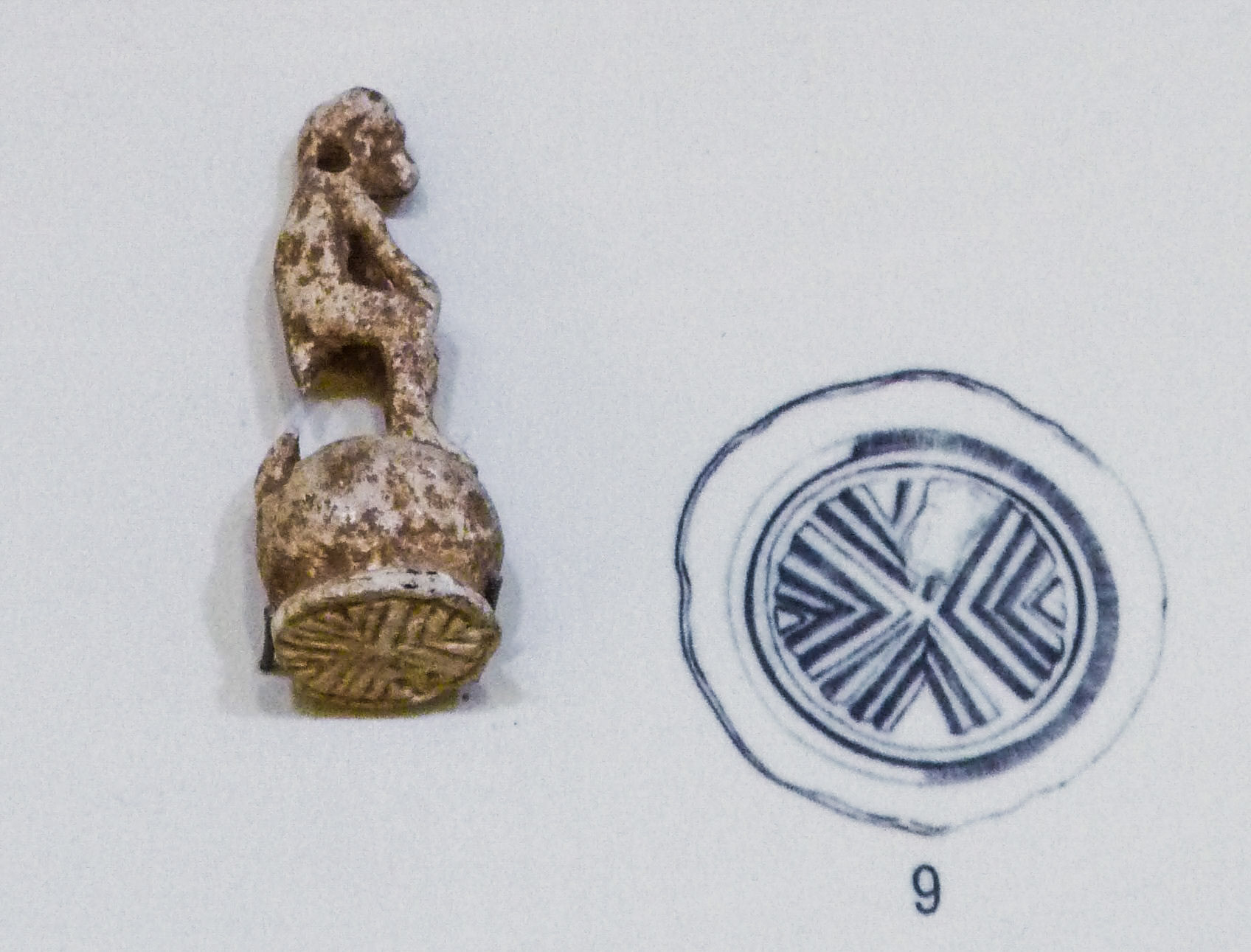
Early ivory "knob seal" with impression, the knob formed as a monkey.

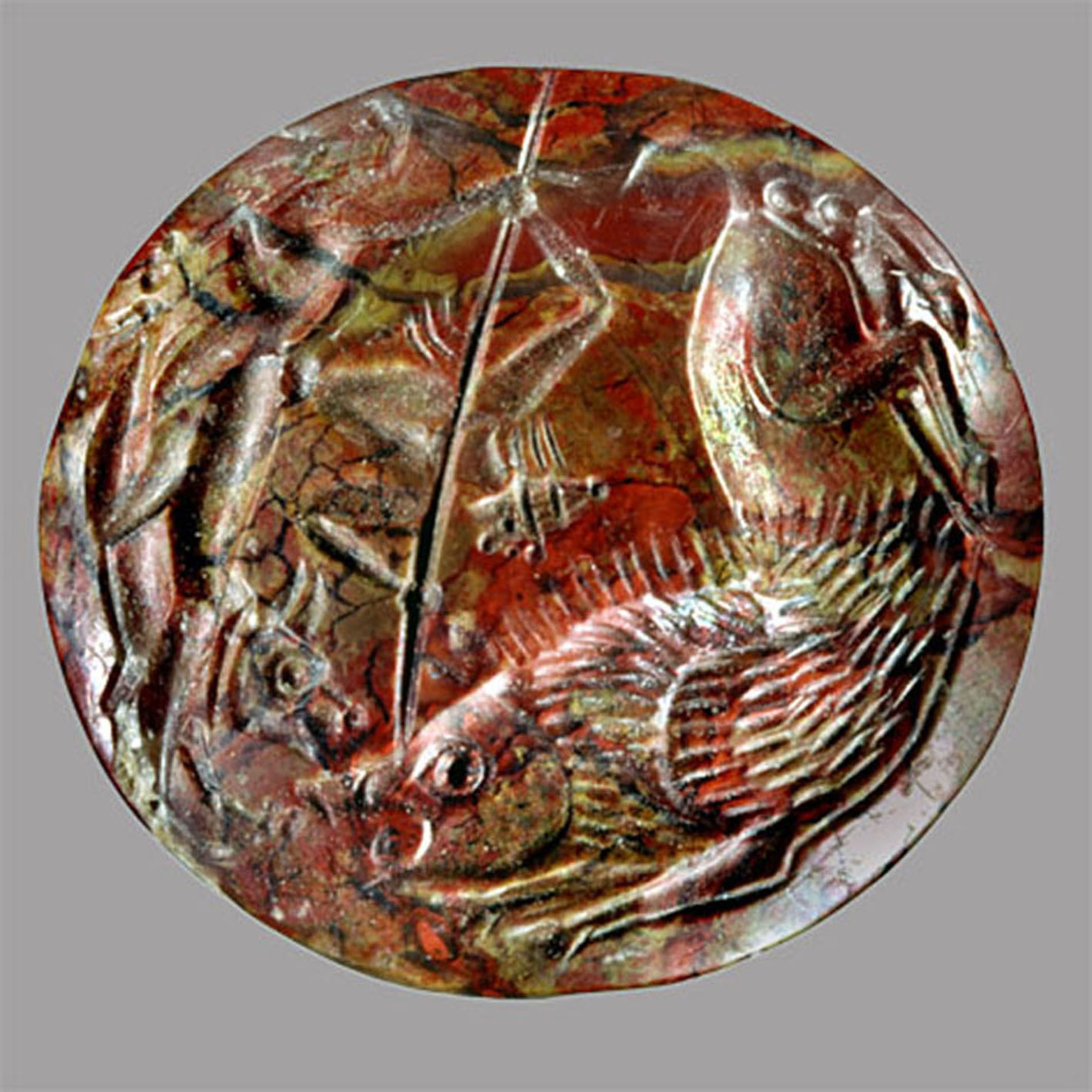
Boar-hunting gem

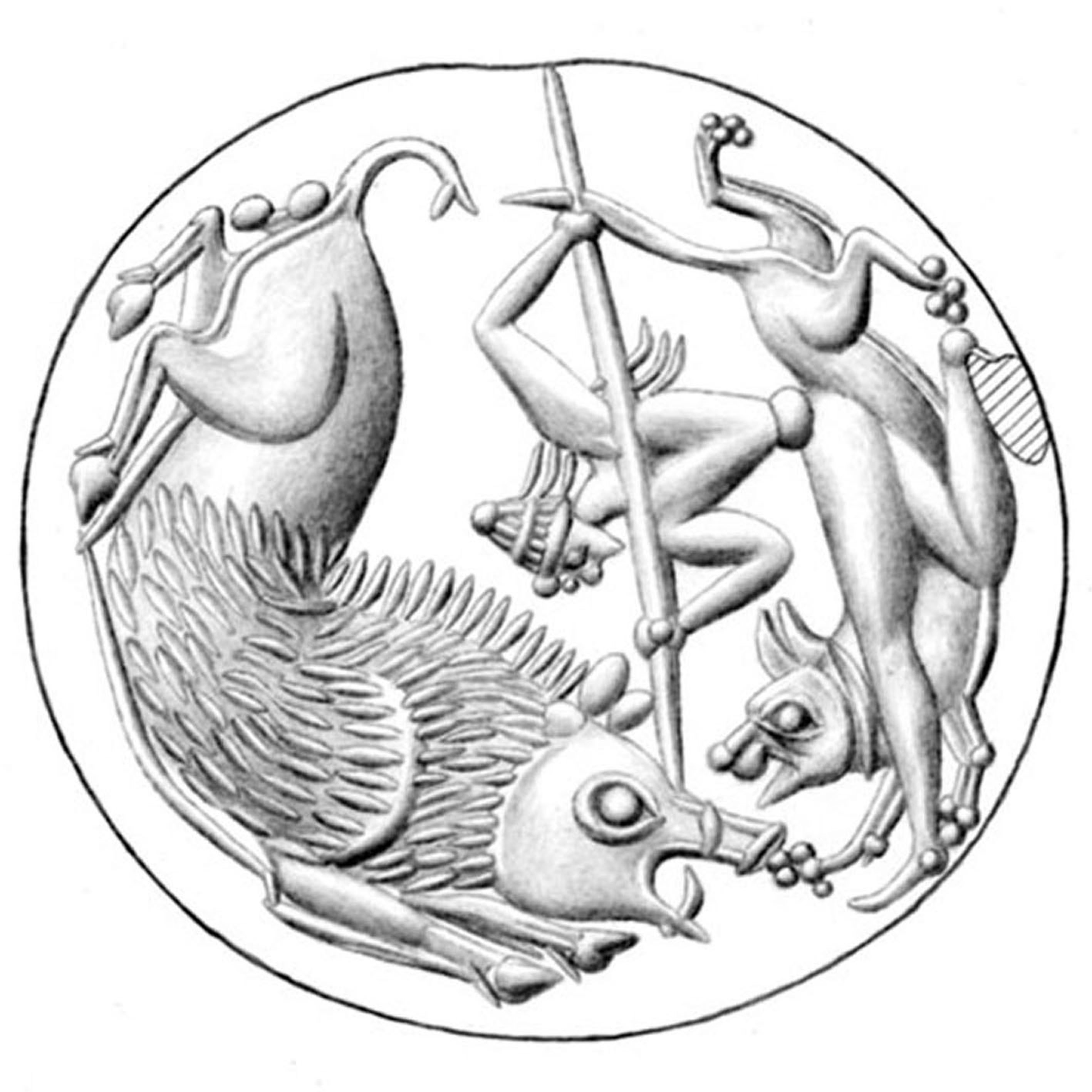
Drawing of last seal

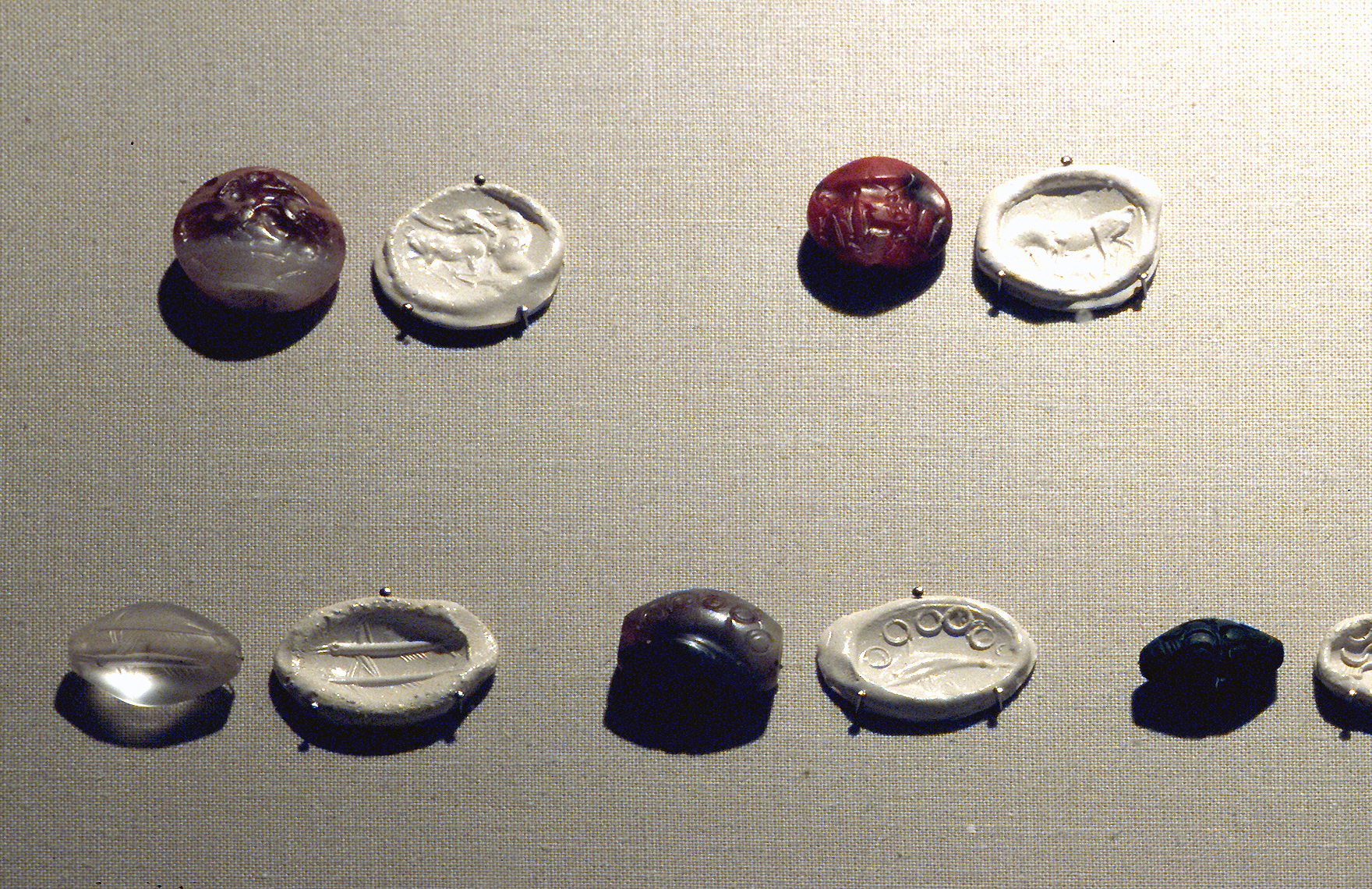
Fish and animal seals and impressions

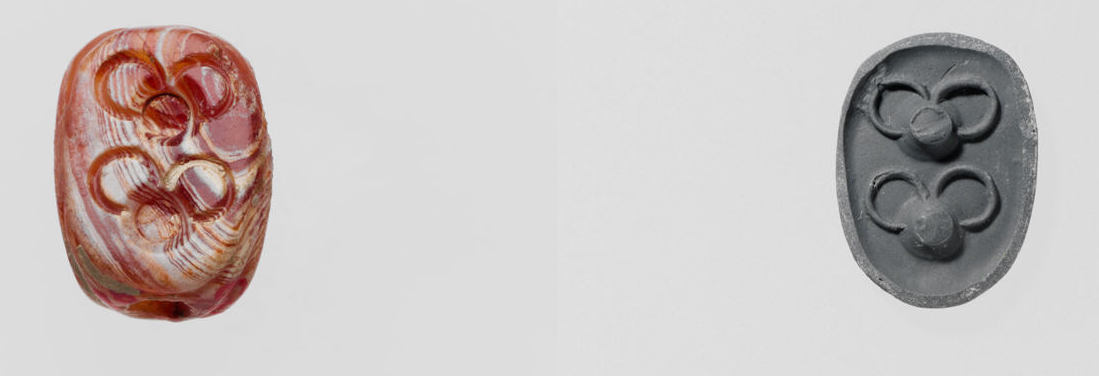
one of the carved faces of a prism seal in jasper

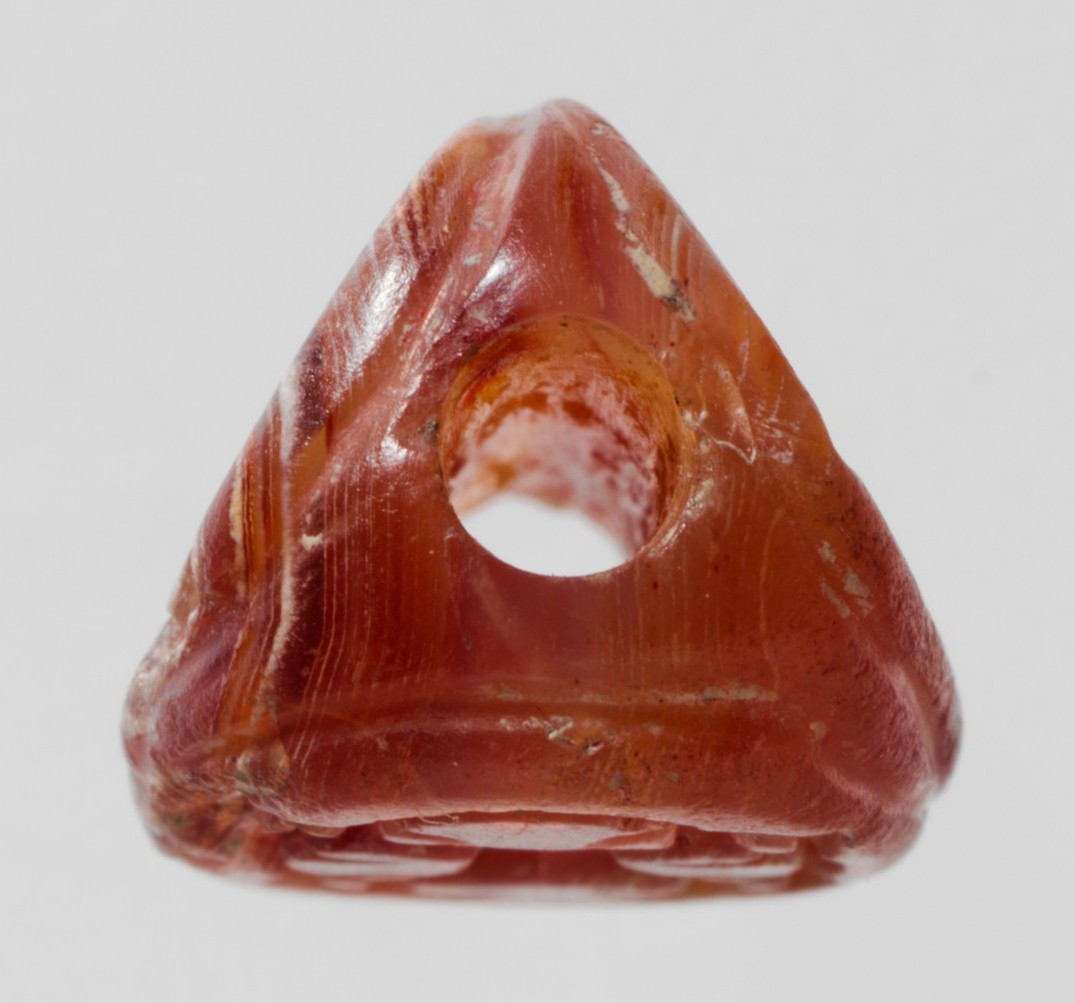
End view of the same "prism" seal in jasper

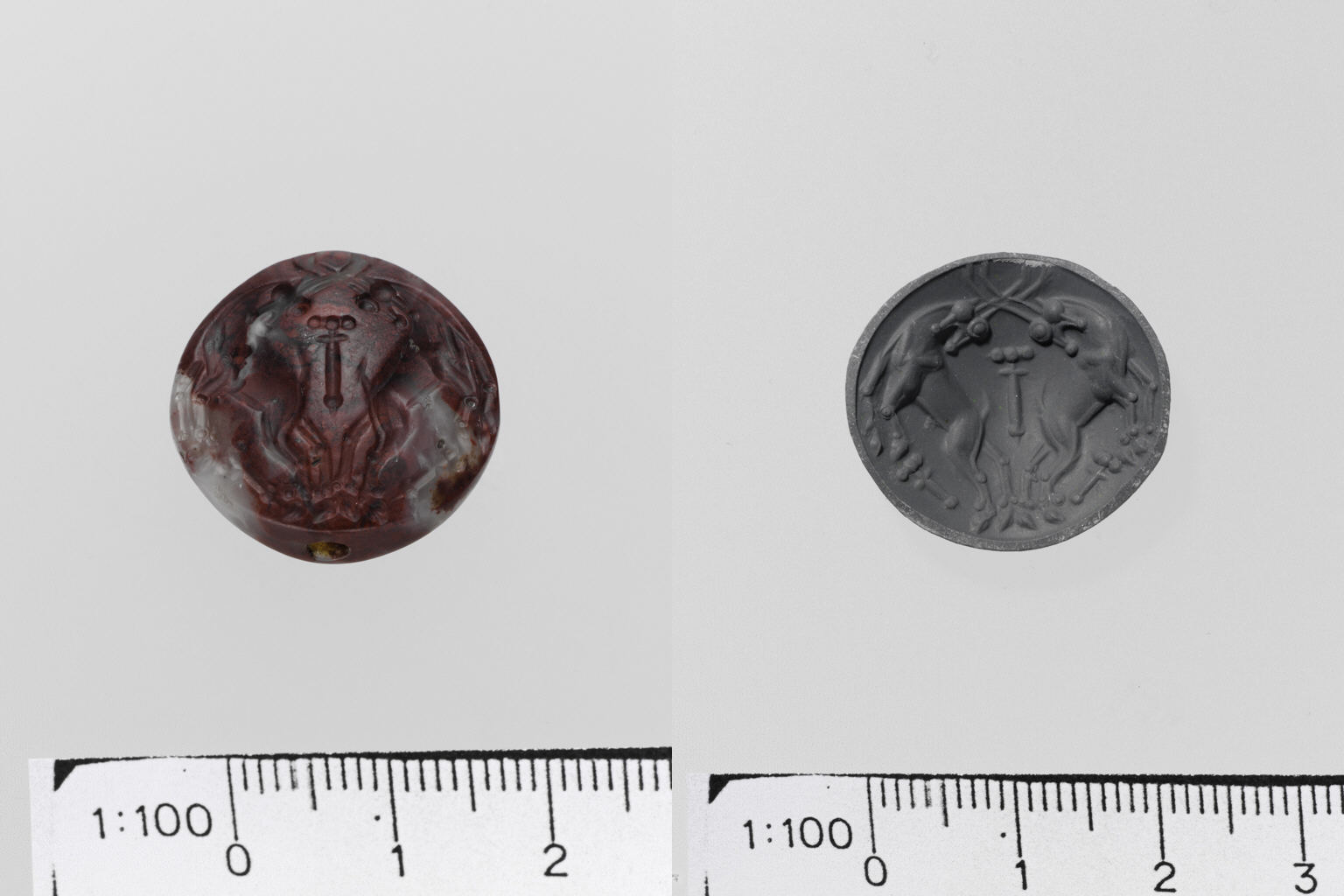
Lentoid Late Minoan seal in agate: seal and impression

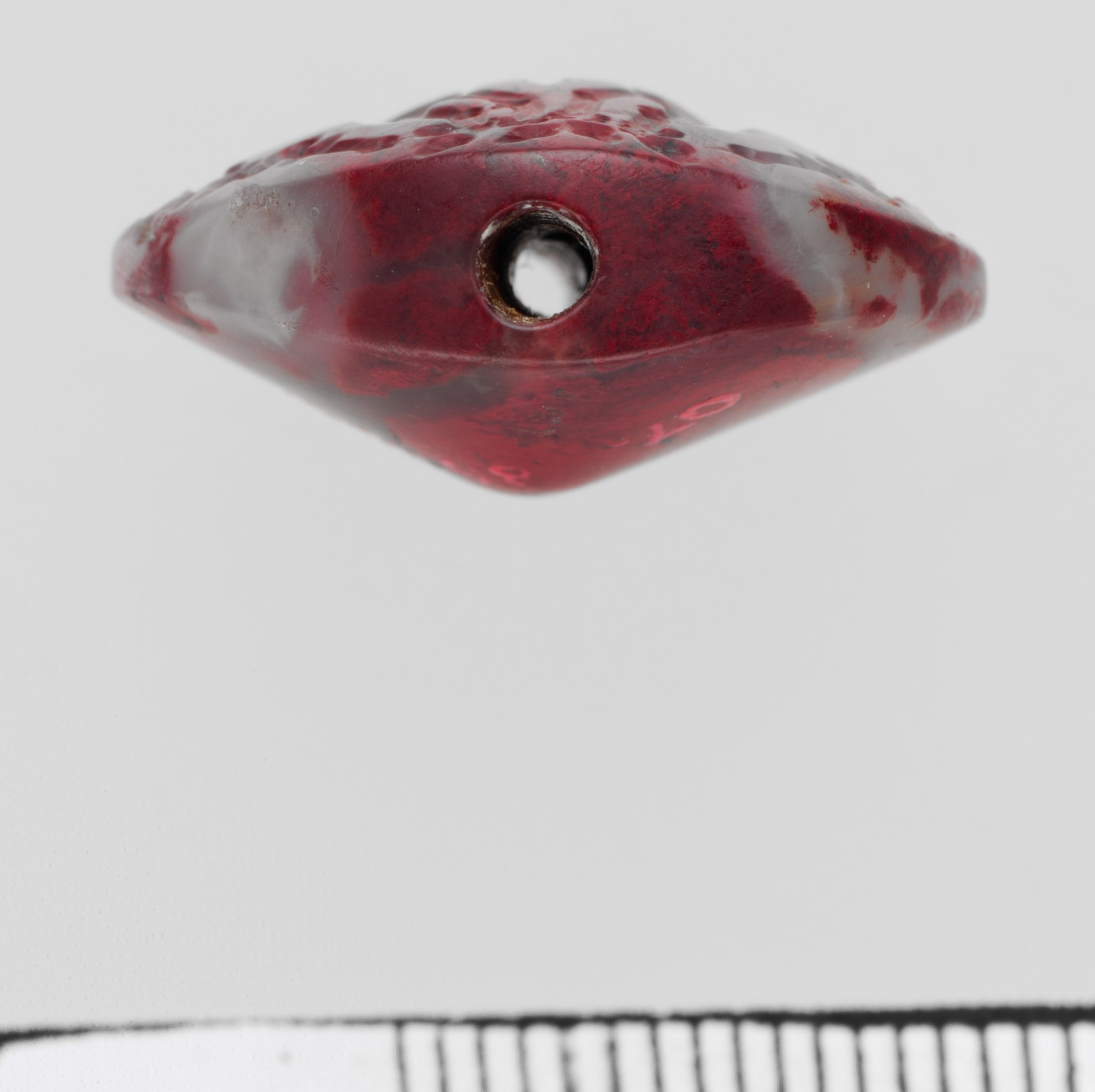
Side view of same seal

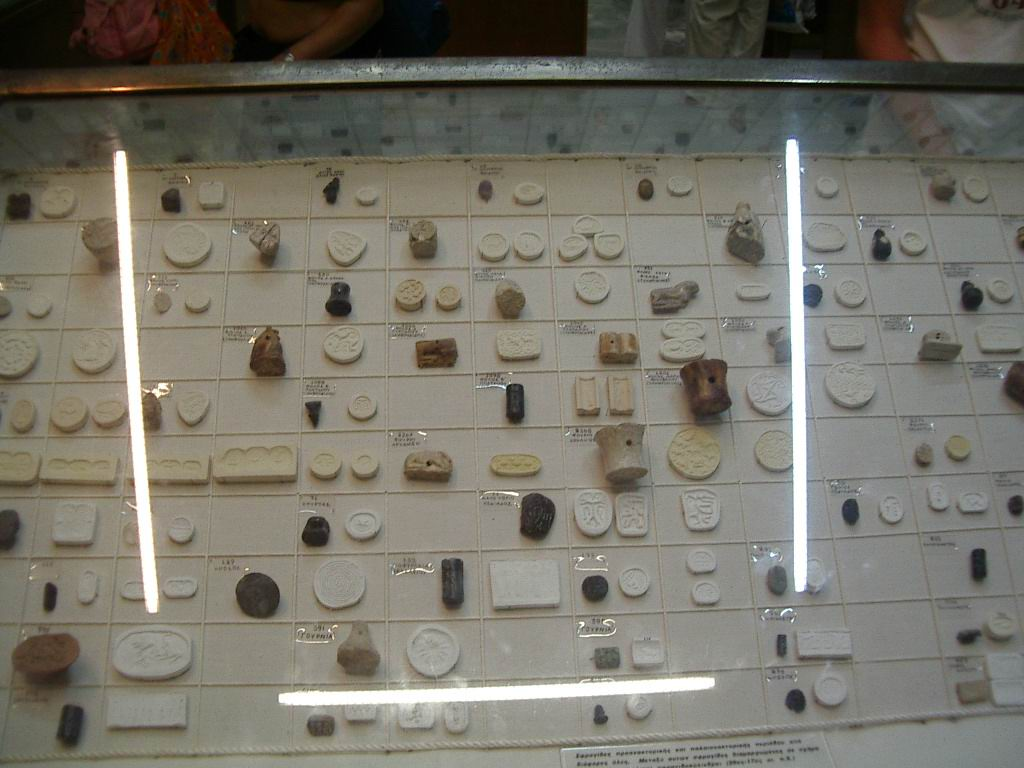
museum examples—impressions
(stamp seals also shown)
