= Winfarthing pendant =

7th-century Anglo-Saxon disc brooch

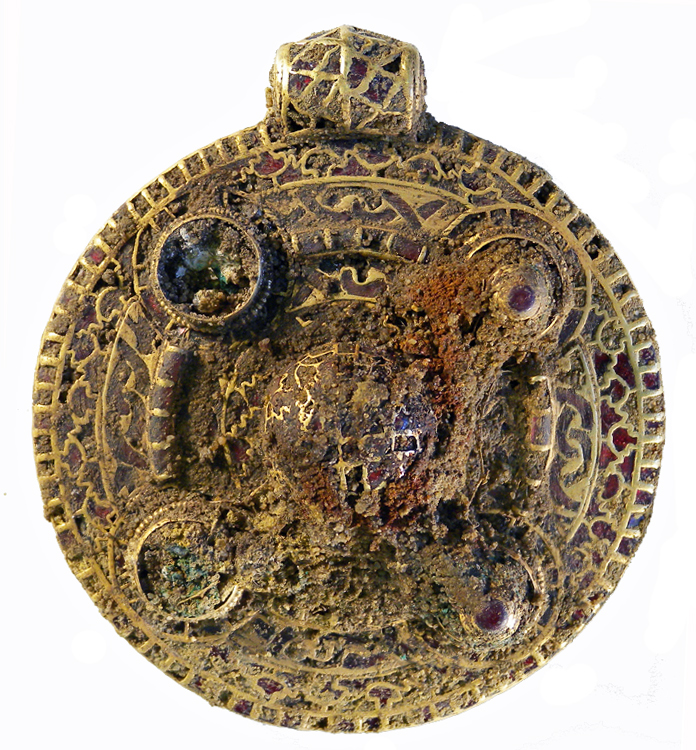
- The Winfarthing pendant, before cleaning.
- Material: Gold, garnet
- Size: 7 cm in diameter
- Created: 7th century AD
- Period/culture: Anglo-Saxon
- Discovered: 2014
- Place: Winfarthing, Norfolk, England

The Winfarthing pendant is a seventh century Anglo-Saxon disc brooch that was found in an undisturbed grave in 2014 near Diss, Norfolk. The gold composite pendant is inlaid with hundreds of small garnets. The pendant is currently on display at the Norfolk Castle Museum.

== Description ==
The circular gold pendant, 7 cm (3 in) in diameter, is made from sheet gold which was fastened with gold cells "inlaid with hundreds of tiny cloisonné-set garnets forming sinuous interlacing beasts and geometrical shapes." The stones are embedded in six concentric bands which surround four outer bosses (protruding stones) and a large central boss.

== History ==
The Winfarthing pendant was found in December, 2014 by landscape archaeology student, Tom Lucking, while metal-detecting in a Winfarthing field near Diss, Norfolk. Lucking initially uncovered an ancient metal bowl, and understanding the significance of his find, stopped digging and contacted the Norfolk County Council's Find Identification and Recording Service. Archaeological excavation at the site uncovered an Anglo-Saxon grave and various burial artefacts, primarily jewellery.

The grave contained the poorly preserved skeleton of a woman, along with the gold and garnet Winfarthing pendant, two Merovingian coin pendants, a necklace of two gold beads, two other pendants in the shape of a Maltese cross, a bronze bowl, an imported biconical pottery jar, copper alloy chatelaine rings, and an iron knife. The worn Merovingian coins dated the grave to the mid to late 7th century. This era is the latest period in which Anglo-Saxon burials with grave goods occurred. The pendant cross motifs suggest that the woman may have been an early convert to Christianity.

The find was declared treasure by the UK Government and was valued at £145,050. A fundraising campaign to buy the pendant for the Norwich Castle Museum by the Friends of Norwich Museum achieved its goal in June 2018. The pendant is on display at the Norwich Castle Museum.

== See also ==
- Harford Farm Brooch
- Kingston Brooch
- Anglo-Saxon brooches
