= Tell Ali Muntar =

Bronze Age archaeological site in Palestine

- Ali Montar, Tell Muntar, Tell Al-Muntar
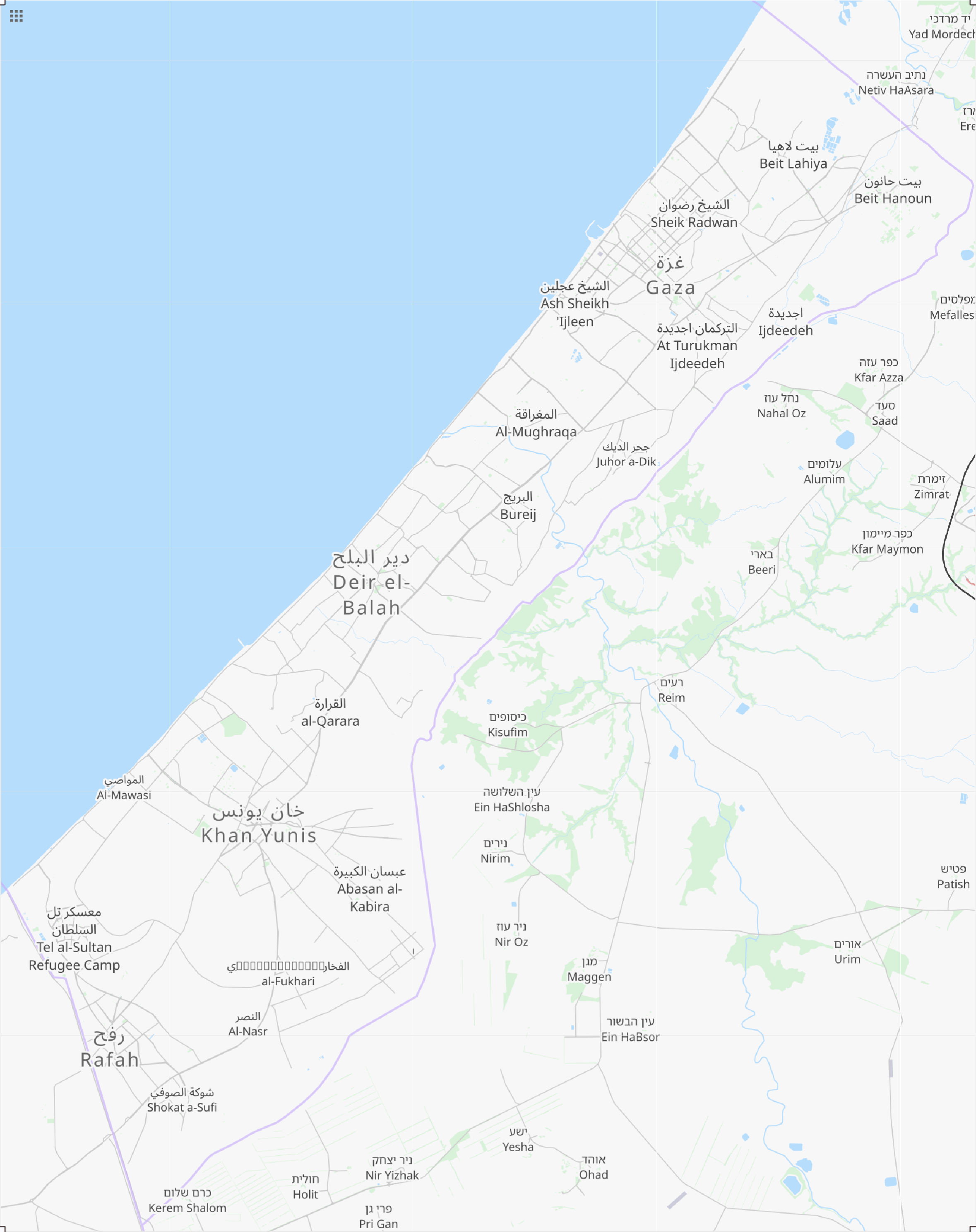
- Location within Gaza City Location within Gaza Strip Location within State of Palestine
- 31°29′25″N 34°28′28″E
- Periods: Bronze Age
- Location: Palestine

Site notes
- Area: c. 100 square metres (1,100 sq ft)

Tell Ali Muntar, also known as Tell al-Muntar, is a tell (a mound created by accumulation of remains) at an elevation of 270 feet (82 m) above sea level, the highest elevation is the area, some 2 kilometres (1 mi) south-east of Gaza City in Palestine. The ancient site is thought to have been occupied in the Middle Bronze Age, about the 2nd millennium BCE, covering an estimated area of 100 square metres (1,100 sq ft).

Tradition holds it as the place where Samson brought down the city gates of the Philistines. The hill is crowned by a Muslim shrine (maqam) dedicated to Ali al-Muntar. There are old Muslim graves around the surrounding trees, and the lintel of the doorway of the maqam has two medieval Arabic scriptures.

Tell Ali Muntar was surveyed in 1998 as part of the Gaza Research Project, but it has not been excavated. The archaeologists discovered mud bricks from buildings and pottery that ranged from the Middle Bronze Age to the Ottoman period. It is likely that Tell Ali Muntar was occupied at the same time as the Bronze Age settlement of Tell Gaza; archaeologists Joanna Clarke and Louise Steel suggest that settlement may have shifted from Tell Muntar to Tell Gaza. UNESCO has verified that more than 150 heritage sites have been damaged or detroyed as a result of the Israeli invasion of the Gaza Strip starting in 2023, including Tell Ali Muntar.

== Bronze Age sites near Gaza ==
- Al-Moghraqa
- Tell Gaza
- Tell el-Ajjul
- Tell es-Sakan
- Deir al-Balah
- Tall Rīdān
- Tell es-Sanam

== See also ==
- List of archaeological sites in the Gaza Strip

== Bibliography ==
- Briggs, Martin Shaw (1918). Through Egypt in War-time. London: T. Fisher Unwin Ltd.
- Clarke, Joanna; Sadeq, Moain (2004), "Gaza Research Project: 1998 Survey of the Old City of Gaza", Levant, 36: 31–36, doi:10.1179/lev.2004.36.1.31
- Clarke, Joanna; Steel, Louise (1999), "Demographic patterns and differential settlement in the Bronze Age landscape of Palestine" (PDF), The landscape of Palestine: equivocal poetry, pp. 211–231, hdl:20.500.11889/4685
- Green, John D.M.; Henry, Ros, eds. (2021). Olga Tufnell's 'Perfect Journey': Letters and photographs of an archaeologist in the Levant and Mediterranean. UCL Press. doi:10.2307/j.ctv18msqnb.14. ISBN 978-1-78735-906-2.
- UNESCO (25 March 2026), "Gaza Strip: Damage assessment", UNESCO
