= Pylos Combat Agate =

Minoan sealstone of the Mycenaean era

- The Pylos Combat Agate
- Material: Agate
- Size: 3.4 centimetres (1.3 in)
- Created: 1450 BCE
- Period/culture: Aegean Bronze Age
- Discovered: 2017; Pylos, Greece; 37°01′41.6″N 21°41′45.4″E
- Discovered by: Sharon Stocker and Jack L. Davis
- Place: Pýlos, Greece

Location
- Location of discovery

The Pylos Combat Agate is a Minoan sealstone of the Mycenaean era, likely manufactured in Late Minoan Crete. It depicts two warriors engaged in hand-to-hand combat, with a third warrior lying on the ground. It was discovered in 2015 during the excavation of the Griffin Warrior Tomb near the Palace of Nestor in Pylos and is dated to about 1450 BCE. The seal has come to be known as Pylos Combat Agate.

The 3.4 cm seal is noted for its exceptionally fine and elaborate engraving, and considered "the single best work of glyptic art ever recovered from the Aegean Bronze Age". Agates demonstrating this level of mastery and expressiveness were not thought to have been produced before the Classical Age, some 1,000 years later.

== Background ==
The Pylos Combat Agate was discovered by a University of Cincinnati archaeological team directed by Sharon Stocker and Jack Davis in the Griffin Warrior Tomb near modern-day Pylos. It consists of an amygdaloid (almond-shaped) sealstone of banded agate, with gold caps, measuring 3.6 cm in length (1.4 in) and was found alongside four gold signet rings.

Though the site was discovered in 2015, the agate, then covered in calcium carbonate encrustations, would not be revealed until 2017 as other finds from the site were published first. Afterwards, the agate underwent conservation and study for a year. Prior to conservation, the stone was believed to be a bead due to its small scale. Due to a longstanding consensus that Mycenaean civilizations imported or stole riches from Minoan Crete, it is believed that the seal was created in Crete. The fact that the stone was found in a Mycenaean tomb in mainland Greece is suggestive of cultural exchange between the Minoan and Mycenaean civilizations.

== Subject matter ==
The seal portrays a warrior who, having already defeated one opponent sprawled at his feet, is plunging his sword into the exposed neck of another foe holding a "figure-of-eight" shield, while at the same time grabbing the crest of the man's helmet. The scene strikingly resembles the one depicted on the gold cushion seal from Shaft Grave III in Grave Circle A in Mycenae (and is similar to other Late Bronze Age signets or seals, such as the "Battle of the Glen" gold signet from the Shaft Grave IV at Mycenae). It is believed that all these objects were modeled after a well-known prototype, perhaps a wall painting, as it had already been suggested for other Early Mycenaean works of glyptic art; this view is partly shared by the discoverers, who otherwise see an intentional parallel between the winning hero in the sealstone and the person who was buried with it, also in view of the correspondence between his arms and ornaments (e.g., a necklace and a sealstone) and objects that are also found in the grave, close to the body.

Similar scenes in Mycenean seals

The combat scene in this gold cushion seal (from Grave III of Grave Circle A in Mycenae) closely resembles the one on the Pylos Combat Agate.

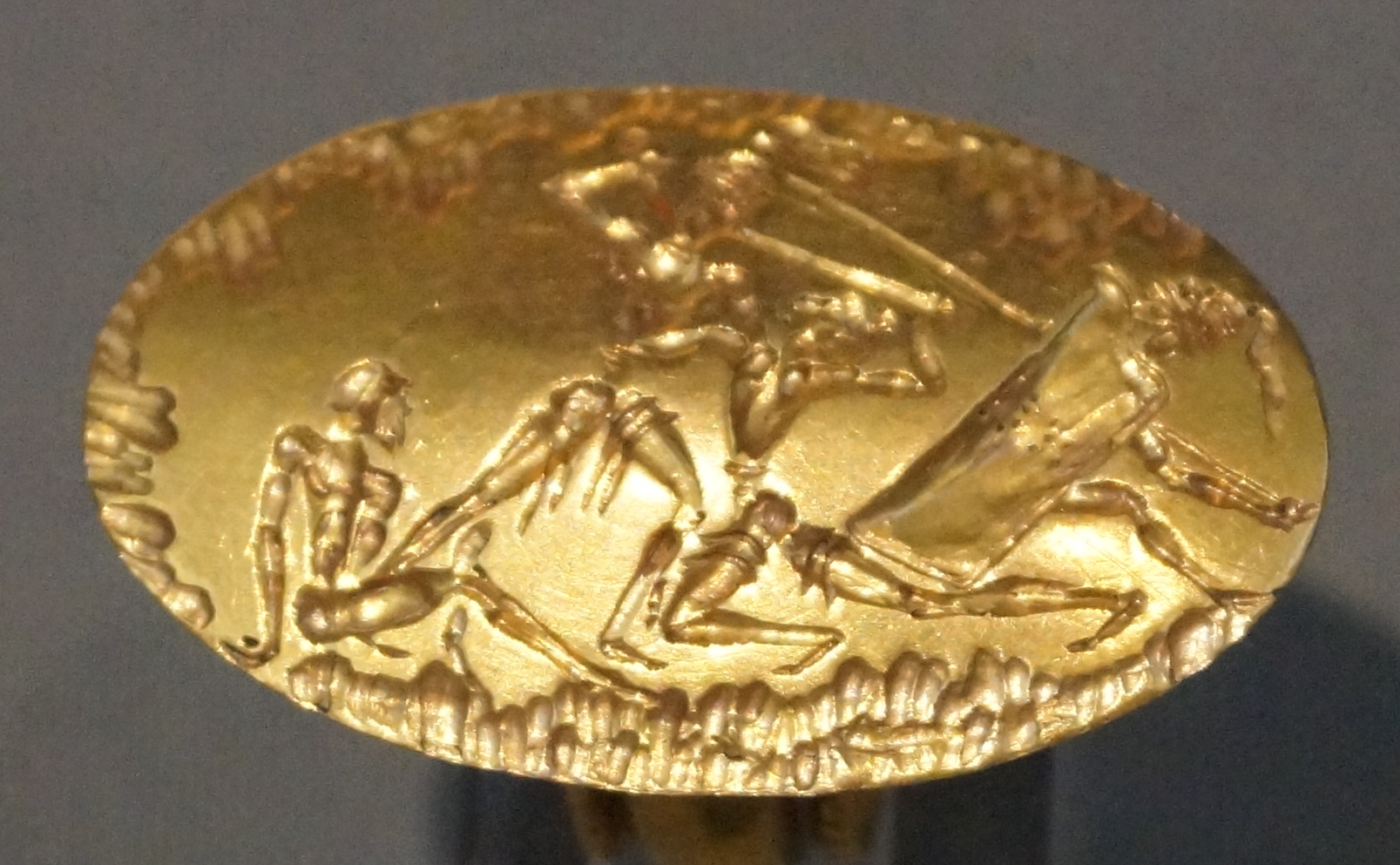
A similar combat scene in the "Battle of the Glen" ring, Shaft Grave IV at Mycenae. National Archaeological Museum of Athens

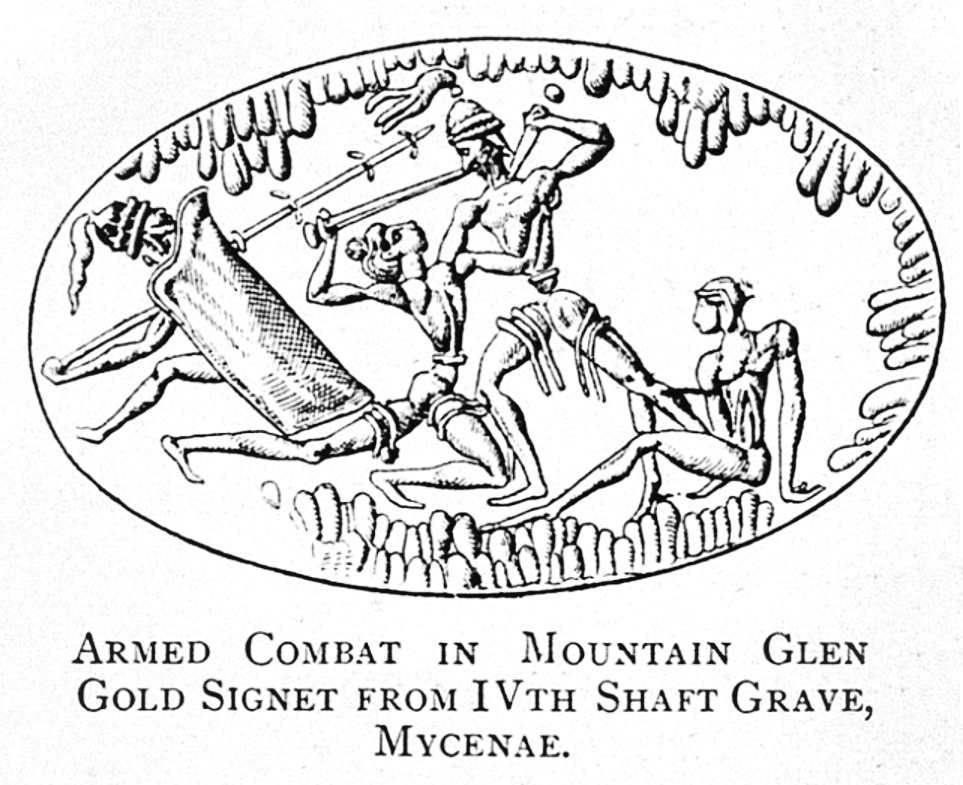
"Battle of the Glen" ring (drawing of the impression)

== Impact ==
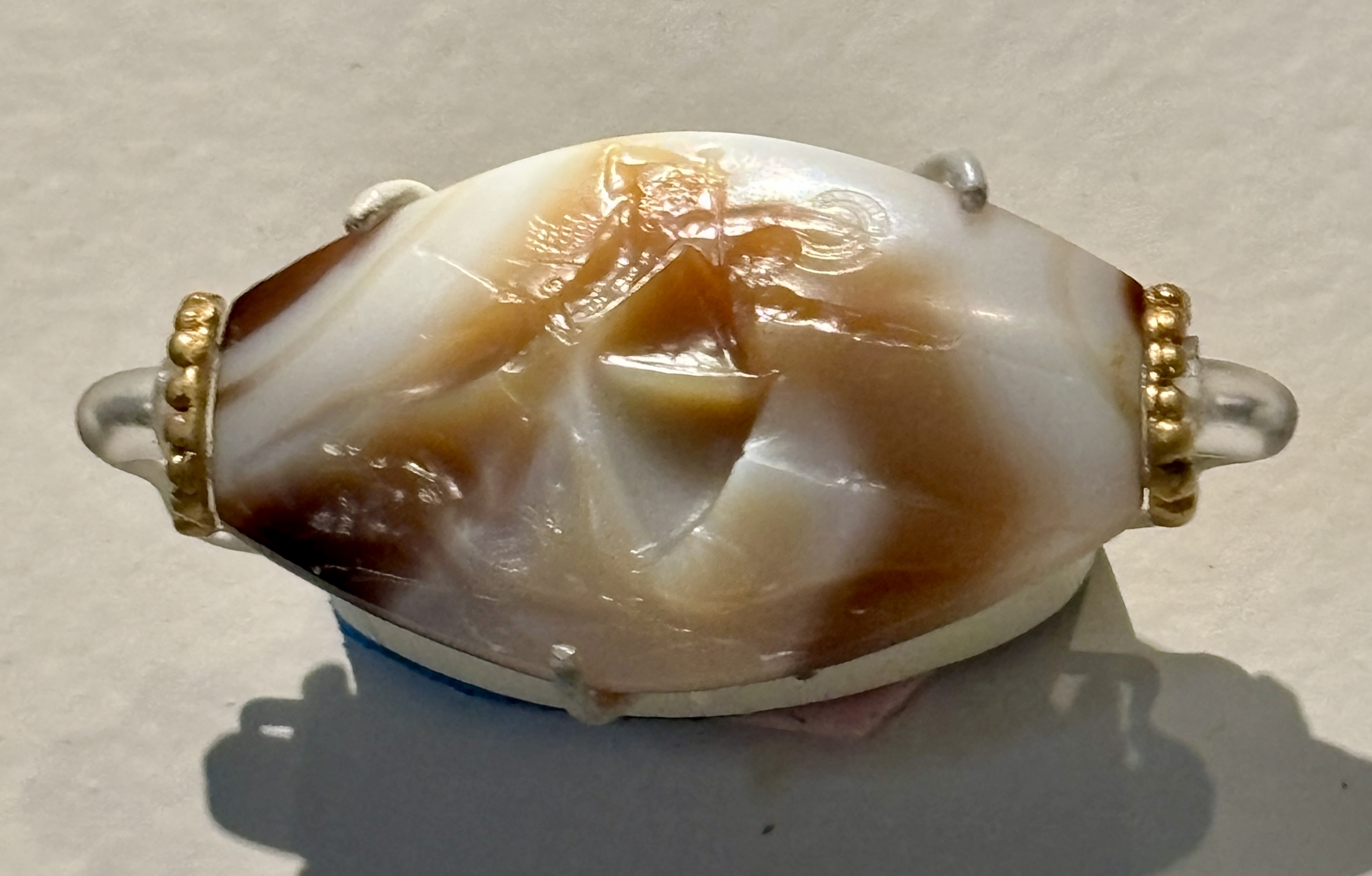
Pylos Combat Agate on exhibit at the Getty Villa, Malibu, California (2025)

In 2016, the Greek Culture Ministry referred to this excavation as the most significant discovery in continental Greece in the last 65 years. The small scale of the intricate details prompted questions regarding ancient Greek civilizations' ability to create such an object; such minute details could have only been created with the help of a magnifying glass; in a survey of lenses in the ancient world, Sines and Yannis note that at least 23 rock crystal lenses have been excavated in and around the Palace of Knossos on Crete, dating to around 1400 BCE. One well preserved example, 14mm in diameter, gave an 11X magnification.

Its co-discoverer Davis refers to the piece as "incomprehensibly small", remarking that works of art with as much detail would not be seen "for another thousand years." He also added: "It seems that the Minoans were producing art of the sort that no one ever imagined they were capable of producing. It's a spectacular find." Researchers have asserted that this discovery challenges previously established consensuses regarding the artistic development of the Minoan civilization. The agate's researchers state that this discovery necessitates a reevaluation of the time-line on which Greek art developed. While dated as belonging to the Aegean Bronze Age, Davis notes that it bears more resemblance to Classical period art, which developed a millennium later, due to the breadth of anatomical knowledge embodied in the stone's engravings.

== See also ==
- Ancient Greek art
- Arkalochori Axe
- Minoan Bull-leaper
- Minoan snake goddess figurines
- Phaistos Disc
