= Matteo Sansone (archaeologist) =

Matteo Sansone (1916–1992) was born in Monte Sant'Angelo, Italy. He was educated as a pharmacist but described himself as "an archaeologist out of passion". He is known for his archaeological work in the Gargano region in Apulia, Italy.
