= Vronwy Hankey =

British archaeologist (1916–1998)

- Hankey with various items of Minoan and Mycenaean pottery
- Born: 15 September 1916
- Died: 11 May 1998 (aged 81)

Academic background
- Education: Girton College, Cambridge

Academic work
- Discipline: Archaeology

Vronwy Hankey, FSA (née Vronwy Mary Fisher; 15 September 1916 – 11 May 1998) was an archaeologist and academic, specialising in Near Eastern archaeology, the Minoan civilization, and Mycenaean Greece. She had an Honorary Fellowship at University College London and an attachment to the university's Petrie Museum of Egyptian Archaeology.

Hankey was born on 15 September 1916 to a Welsh family, and was brought up in Stilton, Huntingdonshire, England. She studied classics at Girton College, Cambridge and graduated with a first class honours degree. She was also awarded a blue in hockey. In 1938, she joined the British School at Athens and was involved in a number of excavations, including those at Knossos and Mycenae.

In 1941 she married Henry Hankey, the son of Maurice Hankey, 1st Baron Hankey, who became a diplomat with whom she travelled for some years before he was posted to London in 1970. Vronwy continued her interest in archaeology alongside her duties as a diplomat's wife, and was the archaeologist "who identified Cyprus as the crucial link between East Mediterranean shipping in the Late Bronze Age."

A scholarship, the Vronwy Hankey Memorial Fund for Aegean Studies, is available from the British School at Athens.
