= 2013 in archaeology =

The year 2013 in archaeology involved some significant events.

== Excavations ==
- May
  - Excavations conducted at the Sobibór Museum in Poland unearth an escape tunnel made by victims of the Holocaust in the Sobibor extermination camp.
  - Excavation of Portuguese carrack Esmeralda, wrecked off the coast of Oman in 1503, by David Mearns begins.
- Excavation of abandoned Bradford Park Avenue football stadium in England begins.
- Excavation and recording of the large-scale military terrain model of the Battle of Messines (1917) on Cannock Chase in England is conducted.
- Excavations of the Roman site at Bloomberg London, beginning in 2010 and including discovery of the Bloomberg tablets, end.
- Excavations conducted in Kaarina find ruins of Ravattula Church, the oldest church building in Finland.
- Salah Hussein A. Al-Houdalieh of Al-Quds University leads a five-week excavation at the Byzantine Church of Khirbet et-Tireh in Palestine.

== Exploration ==
- September - Service tunnel network beneath Hadrian's Villa at Tivoli, Italy.

== Finds ==
- February 4 - DNA evidence confirms that bones found in 2012 at the site of Greyfriars, Leicester, are those of King Richard III of England (k. 1485).
- April - Burial of 5 Celtic warriors at Buchères in France discovered.
- May - Happisburgh footprints, the oldest hominin footprints outside of Africa, dating to more than 800,000 years ago, are discovered on the beach at Happisburgh, Norfolk, England.
- June - Chactún, a Mayan ruin, is discovered in Campeche, Mexico.
- July
  - A substantial and well-preserved section of the Willington Waggonway, an 18th-century wooden railway on Tyneside in England, is found.
  - The unexpected discovery of Pacific walrus bones among 19th-century human burials in St Pancras Old Church graveyard in London (in advance of High Speed 1 railway works) is reported.
- August - A 500-kg bronze statue of Apollo is found by Palestinian fisherman Joudat Ghrab. Dated between the 5th and the 1st century BC, the statue is seized by Hamas officials after briefly appearing on eBay.
- September - Wreck of Lake freighter SS Scotiadoc (sank 1953) located in Lake Superior.
- November - The Seaton Down Hoard of 22,888 Roman coins is found by metal detectorists in Devon, England.
- A grave and first remains of what will be identified as the oldest human burial in Africa – a 3-year old named Mtoto by archaeologists – from 78,000 years BP are located in Kenya.
- Wreck found in Nelson's Dockyard, Antigua, subsequently thought to be French ship Beaumont (1762).
- A draft of the Olive Branch Petition found in the attic of the Morris-Jumel Mansion among papers that had been donated in the early 20th century.

== Events ==
- A wreck found off the coast of modern-day Sweden is identified as the Danish flagship Gribshunden (sank 1495).
- Experimental archaeology: Construction of Campus Galli, a replica Carolingian monastic community in Meßkirch, Baden-Württemberg, Germany, according to period techniques, begins.

== Deaths ==
- 6 June: Malcolm Todd, English archaeologist of the Roman Empire (b. 1939)
- 24 June: Mick Aston, English archaeologist notable for his work with Time Team (b. 1946)

== See also ==
- List of years in archaeology
