= French ship Beaumont =

Several French ships have borne the name Beaumont:

- French ship Beaumont (1762), a 56-gun East Indiaman
- French ship Beaumont (Acadian transport), a ship used to transport Acadians to Louisiana in 1785
