= 1939 in archaeology =

Below are notable events in archaeology that occurred in 1939.

== Excavations ==
- Major excavation of Ostia Antica in Italy begins (continues to 1942).
- University of Pennsylvania project at Piedras Negras, Guatemala ends (started 1931).
- Palace of Nestor in Pylos by Carl Blegen (resumed 1952-69).
- Tomb of Psusennes at Tanis by Pierre Montet (started 1928).
- Deserted medieval village of Seacourt near Oxford by Rupert Bruce-Mitford (June–July 15).
- Medieval settlement at Bere, North Tawton, England, by Martyn Jope.
- Bowl barrow at Knap Hill, Wiltshire, England, by C. W. Phillips.

== Publications ==
- Grahame Clark: Archaeology and Society.

== Finds ==
- May
  - Sutton Hoo ship burial unearthed by Basil Brown and Edith Pretty in Suffolk, England. On July 28 the Sutton Hoo helmet is excavated.
  - Battle of Thermopylae site unearthed by Spyridon Marinatos in Greece.
- August 25: The Lion-man statue is discovered in the Hohlenstein-Stadel, a cave in southern Germany.
- Matthew Stirling discovers the bottom half of Stela C at Tres Zapotes in Veracruz, Mexico.
- Wyllys Andrews discovers the Maya civilization site of Kulubá in Yucatán, Mexico.

== Miscellaneous ==
- May 6: Dorothy Garrod is elected to the Disney Professorship of Archaeology in the University of Cambridge, the first woman to hold an Oxbridge chair.

== Births ==
- January 15: Neil Cossons, English industrial archaeologist and museum director
- July 12: Peter Addyman, English archaeologist
- November 6: Peter J. Reynolds, English experimental archaeologist (d. 2001)
- December 10: Barry Cunliffe, English archaeologist
- November 27: Malcolm Todd, English archaeologist (d. 2013)

== Deaths ==
- March 2: Howard Carter, English Egyptologist (b. 1874)
