= Robin Hood (2010 film) =

Historical action film by Ridley Scott

- British theatrical release poster
- Directed by: Ridley Scott
- Screenplay by: Brian Helgeland
- Story by: Brian Helgeland; Ethan Reiff Cyrus Voris
- Produced by: Ridley Scott; Brian Grazer; Russell Crowe
- Starring: Russell Crowe; Cate Blanchett; William Hurt; Mark Strong; Mark Addy; Oscar Isaac; Danny Huston; Eileen Atkins; Max von Sydow
- Cinematography: John Mathieson
- Edited by: Pietro Scalia
- Music by: Marc Streitenfeld
- Production companies: Universal Pictures; Imagine Entertainment; Relativity Media; Scott Free Productions
- Distributed by: Universal Pictures
- Release dates: 12 May 2010 (Cannes Film Festival and United Kingdom); 14 May 2010 (United States)
- Running time: 140 minutes
- Countries: United Kingdom; United States
- Language: English
- Budget: $155–237 million
- Box office: $321.7 million

Robin Hood is a 2010 historical action film directed by Ridley Scott and written by Brian Helgeland, which was based on a story written by Helgeland and the writing duo of Ethan Reiff and Cyrus Voris. It stars Russell Crowe as the outlaw legend, alongside Cate Blanchett, William Hurt, Mark Strong, Mark Addy, Oscar Isaac, Danny Huston, Eileen Atkins, and Max von Sydow.

Development began on the project in January 2007 with Universal Pictures' purchase of a spec script by Reiff and Voris, which would see the film focus on a more prominent and sympathetic Sheriff of Nottingham. Casting Crowe in the title role, Ridley Scott was hired to direct later that same year. Rewrites delayed the film throughout 2008, with Helgeland hired to rewrite the screenplay, which saw a refocus of the story to be about Robin Hood once again, abandoning the Nottingham angle entirely. Filming commenced in March 2009 throughout England and Wales.

Robin Hood held its world premiere at the 2010 Cannes Film Festival on 12 May 2010, the same day as its United Kingdom and Ireland release, and was later released on 14 May in the United States by Universal Pictures. The film received mixed reviews from critics and grossed $322 million worldwide against a $155–237 million budget.

== Plot ==
In AD 1199, Robin Longstride serves as a common archer in the army of King Richard the Lionheart. A veteran of Richard's crusade, he now takes part in the siege of Chalus Castle. Disillusioned, war-weary, and facing charges of misconduct after a tavern brawl, he gives a frank but unflattering appraisal of the King's conduct when the King asks for it, and Robin and his comrades—archers Allan A'Dayle and Will Scarlett and soldier Little John—are locked in the stocks.

After the King is killed during an attack on the castle, Robin and his comrades manage to free themselves and desert. They come across an ambush of the English royal guard by Godfrey, an English knight who has conspired with King Philip of France to assassinate King Richard. After pursuing Godfrey away, Robin and his Merry Men take advantage of the situation by impersonating the dead English knights to return to England, as they fear they will not be able to afford the passage during the ensuing retreat. Before they depart to sail across the Channel, he promises a dying knight, Sir Robert of Loxley, to return his sword to his father in Nottingham and deliver the news of the King's death.

Awaking to find their ship arrived in the Thames estuary, Robin must continue to assume the identity of Loxley to deliver Richard's crown to the Royal Family. He witnesses the coronation of King John, who orders the collection of harsh new taxes. William Marshal, the Lord Chancellor since the days of John's father, opposes the new taxes and is relieved of his position by John. The new king dispatches Godfrey to the North to collect the taxes—unaware that Godfrey will instead use French troops to stir up unrest and prepare for King Philip to invade England. In secret, spies working for Marshal follow Godfrey's men and learn of the planned invasion of England.

Robin and his companions head to Nottingham, where Loxley's elderly and blind father, Sir Walter, asks him to continue impersonating his son to prevent the Crown from seizing the Loxley family lands. Loxley's widow, Lady Marian, is initially cold toward Robin, but warms to him when he and his men recover grain for the townsfolk to plant.

Godfrey's actions incite the northern barons, who march to meet King John. Speaking now for Sir Walter, Robin proposes that King John agree to a charter of rights to ensure the rights of every Englishman and to unite his country. Realizing Godfrey's deception, and knowing he must meet the French invasion with an army, the King agrees. Meanwhile, French marauders plunder Nottingham. Robin and the northern barons arrive to stop Godfrey's men, but not before Godfrey has slain the blind Sir Walter.

As the main French expeditionary force begins its invasion of England on a beach below the cliffs of Dover, Robin leads the now united English army against them and Marian joins the fray with the forest orphans at her side. In the midst of the battle, Robin duels with Godfrey, who attempts to kill Marian and flees until Robin finally puts an arrow through his neck from afar. King Philip realizes that his plan to divide England has failed and calls off his invasion. When King John sees the French surrendering to Robin instead of to himself, he senses a threat to his power.

In London, King John reneges on his promise to sign the charter and declares Robin an outlaw to be hunted throughout the kingdom. The Sheriff of Nottingham announces the decree, and Robin and his men flee to Sherwood Forest with the orphans of Nottingham. Marian narrates their new life in the greenwood, noting that they live in equality as they right the many wrongs in the kingdom of King John.

== Cast ==
- Russell Crowe as Robin Longstride, an English archer and crusade veteran
  - Jack Downham as young Robin
- Cate Blanchett as Marian of Loxley, wife of Sir Robert of Loxley
- William Hurt as William Marshal, a knight and advisor to the English Crown
- Mark Strong as Godfrey, an English knight and traitor who works for King Philip
- Mark Addy as Friar Tuck, an amiable priest of Nottingham
- Oscar Isaac as Prince John, Richard's younger brother
- Danny Huston as Richard the Lionheart, King of England and crusader
- Kevin Durand as Little John, a strong-willed Scottish soldier
- Scott Grimes as Will Scarlet, a young Welsh archer
- Matthew Macfadyen as Sheriff of Nottingham, the chief lawman of Nottinghamshire
- Eileen Atkins as Eleanor of Aquitaine, formerly Queen of England, mother to Richard and John
- Simon McBurney as Father Tancred
- Max von Sydow as Sir Walter Loxley, an elderly Baron of Nottingham
- Alan Doyle as Allan A'Dayle, an Irish archer and minstrel
- Léa Seydoux as Isabella of Angoulême, a French princess and mistress of Prince John
- Douglas Hodge as Sir Robert Loxley, an English knight in King Richard's service
- Gerard McSorley as Baron Fitzrobert, an English nobleman
- Robert Pugh as Baron Baldwin, an English nobleman
- Jonathan Zaccaï as King Philip of France, ruler of France
- Velibor Topić as Belvedere, a French knight
- Denise Gough as Village Mother
- Pip Carter as Royal Equery
- Mark Lewis Jones as Stone Mason Longstride
- Bronson Webb as Jimoen
- Denis Ménochet as Adhemar
- Luke Evans as Sheriff's Thug
- Roy Holder as Gaffer Tom
- Ned Dennehy as Sentinel
- Jessica Raine as Princess Isabel of Gloucester, the wife of Prince John
- Steve Evets as Ragged Messenger
- Arthur Darvill as Groom
- Giannina Facio as Lady-in-Waiting
- Ralph Ineson as Northerner

== Production ==
=== Development and pre-production ===
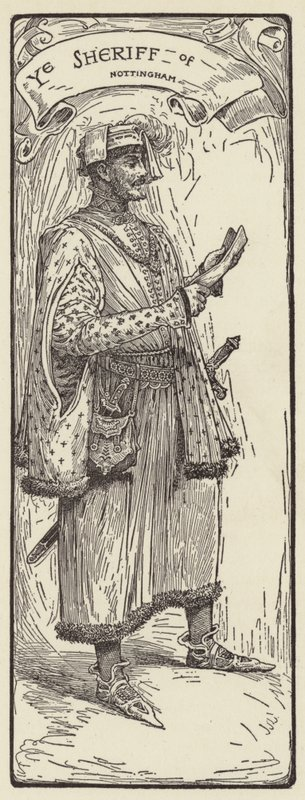
Earlier drafts of the script featured a bigger, more sympathetic focus on the Sheriff of Nottingham, with one idea being Robin Hood beginning as the Sheriff.

In January 2007, Universal Studios and Brian Grazer's Imagine Entertainment acquired a spec script written by Ethan Reiff and Cyrus Voris, creators of the television series Sleeper Cell. Their script portrayed a more sympathetic Sheriff of Nottingham and less virtuous Robin Hood, who becomes involved in a love triangle with Lady Marian. The writers received a seven-figure deal for the purchase. The following April, Ridley Scott was hired to direct the film, with Sam Raimi and Bryan Singer also considered for the position. Scott had attempted to get rights for himself and 20th Century Fox, but had previously collaborated with Grazer on American Gangster and signed on as director rather than a producer. Scott claimed two previous film adaptations of Robin Hood: The Adventures of Robin Hood (1938) and Robin Hood: Prince of Thieves (1991) had failed to hit the target, saying "the best, frankly, was Mel Brooks's Men in Tights (1993), because Cary Elwes was quite a comic".

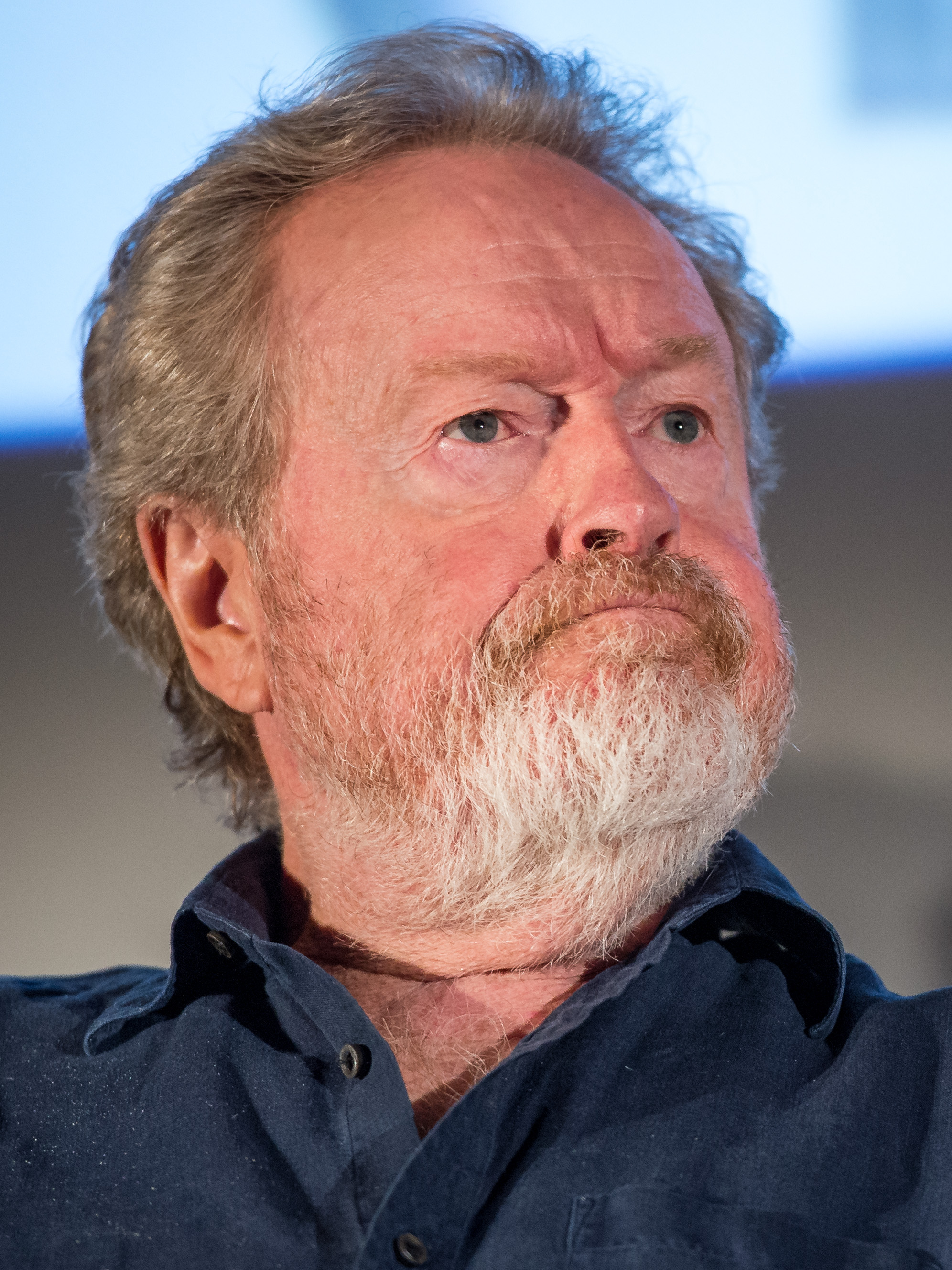
Director Scott in 2015

Scott's dissatisfaction with the script led him to delay filming, and during 2008 it was rewritten into a story about Robin Hood becoming an outlaw; at one point Crowe was even being considered for a dual role as both Robin and the Sheriff. Scott dropped the latter notion and Nottingham was retitled to reflect the more traditional angle. In June, screenwriter Brian Helgeland was hired to rewrite the script by Reiff and Voris. Producer Marc Shmuger explained Scott had a different interpretation of the story from "the script, [which] had the sheriff of Nottingham as a CSI-style forensics investigator". Scott elaborated the script, portraying the Sheriff of Nottingham as being Richard the Lionheart's right-hand man, who returns to England to serve Prince John after Richard's assassination. Though Scott felt John "was actually pretty smart, he got a bad rap because he introduced taxation so he's the bad guy in this", and the Sheriff would have been torn between the "two wrongs" of a corrupt king and an outlaw inciting anarchy. Locations were sought in North East England including Alnwick Castle, Bamburgh Castle and Kielder Forest. A portion of filming was intended to take place in Northumberland. As a result of the WGA strike, production was put on hold.

Filming was scheduled to begin in August in Sherwood Forest if the 2008 Screen Actors Guild strike did not take place, for release on 26 November 2009. By July, filming was delayed, and playwright Paul Webb was hired to rewrite the script. The film was moved to 2010. The Sheriff of Nottingham's character was then merged with Robin. Scott describes the identity of Robin, "In the context of the story he starts off as one thing, becomes the guise of another and then has to retire to the forest to resume his name Robin, so he was momentarily the Sheriff of Nottingham." Helgeland returned to rewrite, adding an opening where Robin witnesses the Sheriff dying in battle, and takes over his identity. Scott chose to begin filming in February 2009 in forests around London, having discovered many trees which had not been pollarded. By February 2009, Scott revealed Nottingham had become his version of Robin Hood, as he had become dissatisfied with the idea of Robin starting as the Sheriff.

=== Casting ===
Russell Crowe was cast into the role of Robin Hood in January 2007, with a fee of $20 million against 20% of the gross. The next addition to the cast was Mark Strong. When interviewed about his role, Strong stated his character of Sir Godfrey was originally called Conrad and was based on Guy of Gisbourne. He described the original character as having blond hair and being disfigured from being struck by a crossbow bolt.

In February 2009, Cate Blanchett was cast to play Maid Marian, replacing Sienna Miller who was previously cast, but exited in late 2008 as due to rewrites in the script, she was now considered too young for the role. Rachel Weisz and Kate Winslet were considered for the role prior to Blanchett signing on. Prior to the start of filming in March, Kevin Durand, Scott Grimes and Alan Doyle were cast to portray Little John, Will Scarlet and Allan A'Dayle, respectively, with Vanessa Redgrave as Eleanor of Aquitane, Oscar Isaac as Prince John and Léa Seydoux as Isabella of Angoulême. Redgrave withdrew from the film following the death of her daughter Natasha Richardson, replaced with Eileen Atkins. The castings of William Hurt and Matthew Macfadyen were announced in April, with Macfadyen portraying the Sheriff. Danny Huston joined in July as King Richard, a role Rhys Ifans was initially in line for.

=== Filming ===
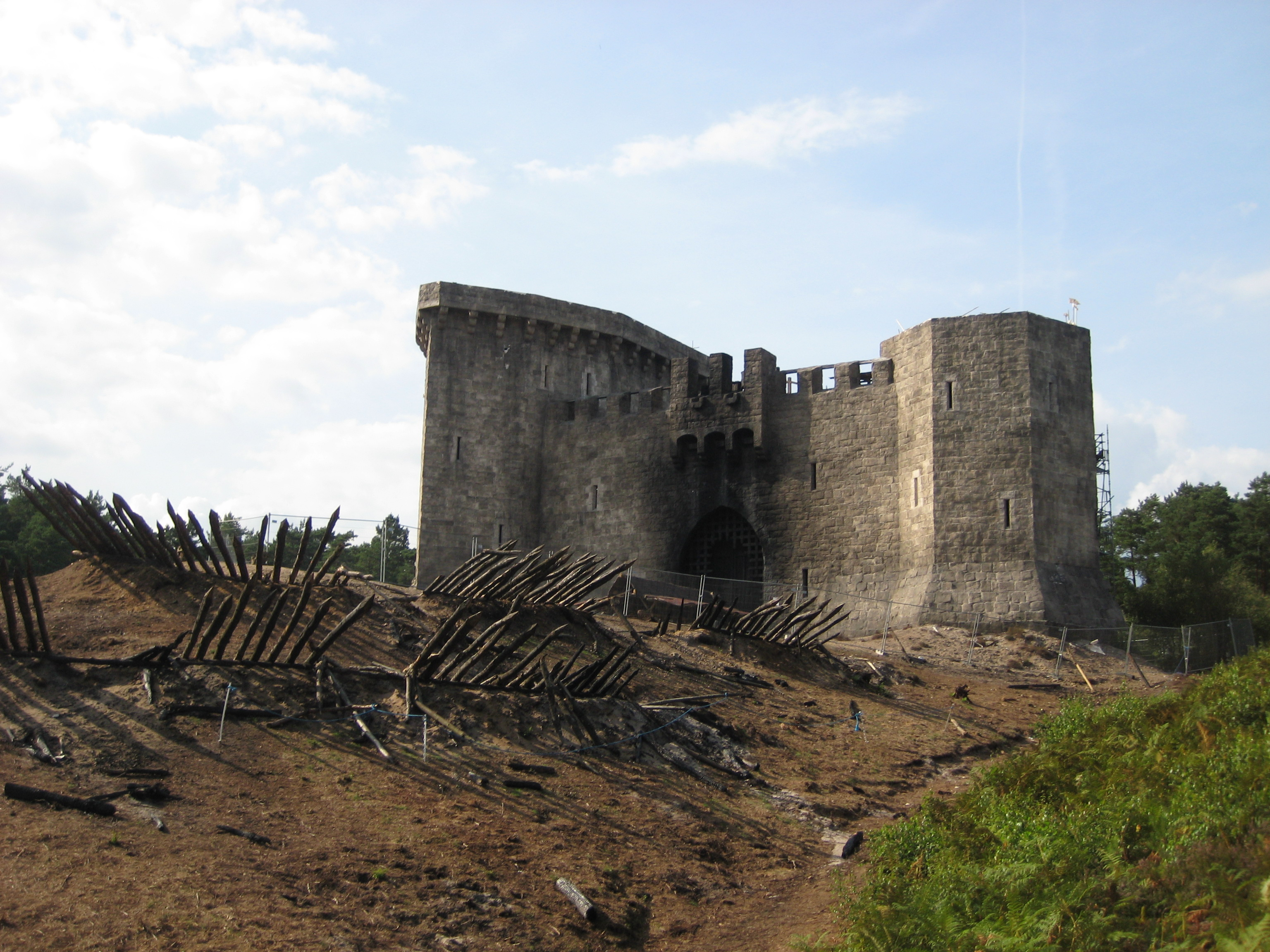
Mock castle at the Bourne Wood at the end of filming, showing the burnt-out castle gate

Filming began on 30 March 2009. In June and July, the crew filmed at Freshwater West beach, in Pembrokeshire, Wales. The arrival of the dead king's cog (boat), accompanied by Robin and his men, at the Tower of London was filmed at Virginia Water, where a partial mock-up of the Tower was built. Extensive scenes from the film were filmed on the Ashridge Estate, Little Gaddesden, on the Hertfordshire/Buckinghamshire border. Filming of the siege of Castle Chalus took place at the Bourne Wood at Farnham, Surrey during July and August. Filming also took place at Dovedale near Ashbourne, Derbyshire. On July 31, thieves broke into the props building at night and stole cameras that were being used for the film.

The battering ram used during the filming at the Bourne Wood in Surrey, which was nicknamed 'Rosie' by the film crew and is worth £60,000, was donated by Russell Crowe to a Scottish charity, the Clanranald Trust to be used for battle re-enactments at a fort named Duncarron, built in a forest in North Lanarkshire near the Carron Valley Reservoir.

Crowe rode the same horse, George, that he had ridden in Gladiator. During the shoot, Crowe fractured both of his legs doing a scene in which he "jumped off a castle portcullis onto rock-hard uneven ground" and said he "never discussed the injury with production, never took a day off because of it, I just kept going to work", only learning about the injury from an X-ray a decade later.

=== Visual effects ===
Moving Picture Company (MPC) provided the visual effects for the film. Richard Stammers, MPC's visual effects supervisor, worked with Universal Pictures's visual effects producer Allen Maris to "achieve a wide range of visual effects", which included computer-animated armies, boats, arrows, and digital environments. A challenge for MPC was to create the invading French Armada and the ensuing battle with the English army; 200 computer-animated ships and 6000 soldiers were added to the 8 practical boats, with 500 extras used in principal photography. Alice, MPC's proprietary crowd generation software, was used to simulate the rowing and disembarkation of French soldiers and horses. The water interactions were generated using Flowline. Matte paintings and computer-animated projections were used to reconstruct the medieval city in the film. MPC created cliffs to surround the beach environment, which was added to 75 shots.

== Soundtrack ==
The soundtrack to Robin Hood, with music written and performed by Marc Streitenfeld, was released on 11 May 2010.

== Release ==
Robin Hood held its world premiere at the 2010 Cannes Film Festival the same day as its United Kingdom and Ireland releases. It was then released on 14 May 2010 in North America. The film premiered in Japan on 10 December 2010.

=== Home media ===
Robin Hood was released on DVD and Blu-ray Disc on 20 September 2010 in the UK, and the following day in the US. While the UK home media releases only consisted of the extended 'Director's Cut' version (16 additional minutes), the US DVD and Blu-ray Discs consisted of both the 'Director's Cut' version and the shorter theatrical version.

== Reception ==
=== Box office ===
On its opening week, the film took in £5,750,332 in the UK, ahead of Iron Man 2, and $36,063,385 in the US and Canada. It grossed a total of £15,381,416 in the UK, $105.2 million in North America and $321,669,741 worldwide. Although the film performed better overseas, the box office figures were still seen as somewhat of a disappointment. Brandon Gray of Box Office Mojo thought the take was unfairly maligned. Gray wrote that the film was among the highest grossing medieval-period films of all time, and that the true financial issue was the production going over budget rather than returns being particularly beneath expectations.

=== Critical reception ===
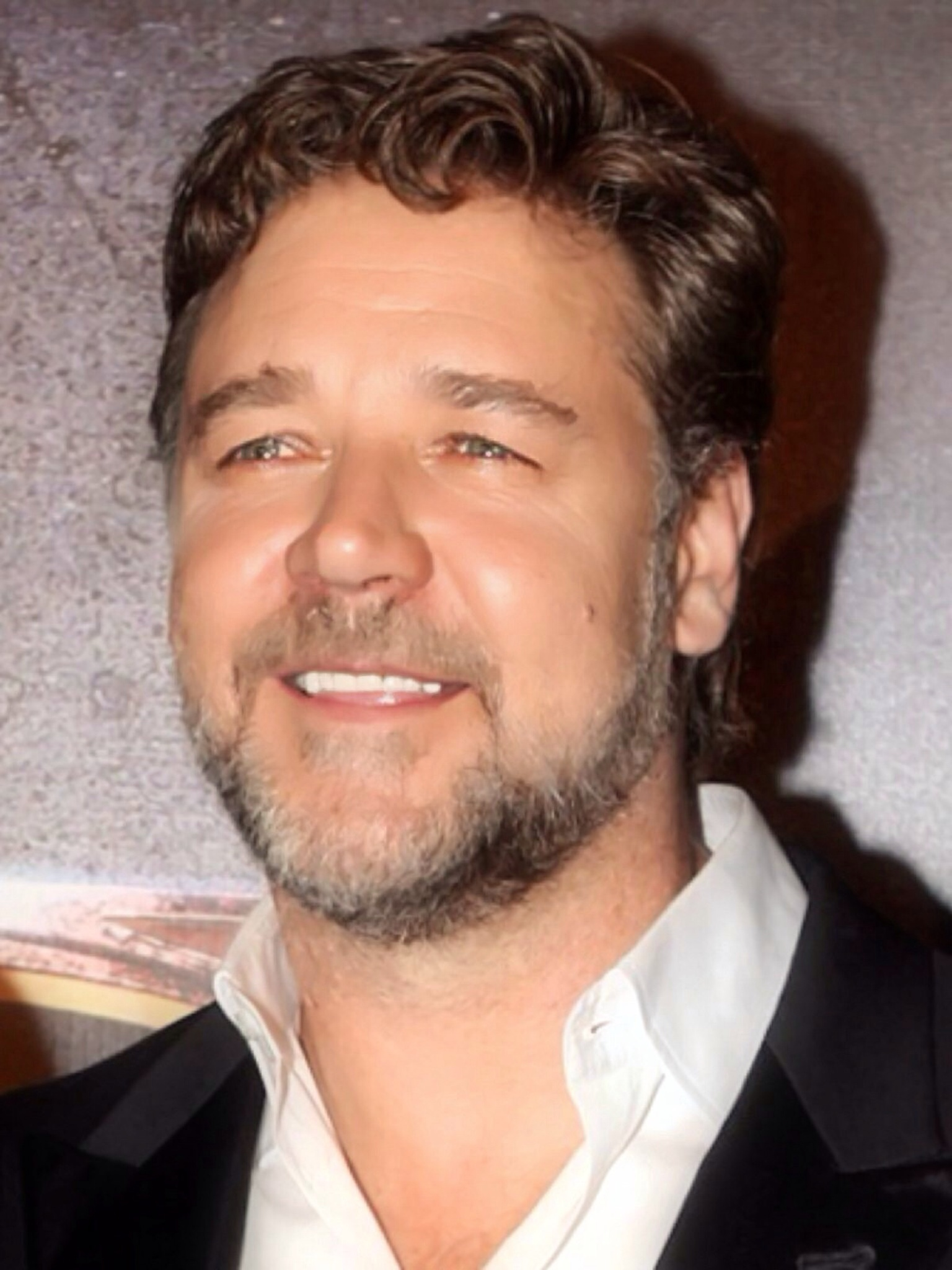
Russell Crowe's performance as Robin earned a mixed response, with some specific criticism focused particularly on his accent in the film.

On review aggregate website Rotten Tomatoes the film holds an approval rating of 43% based on 251 reviews, with an average rating of 5.4/10. The website's critical consensus reads, "Ridley Scott's revisionist take on this oft-told tale offers some fine acting and a few gripping action sequences, but it's missing the thrill of adventure that made Robin Hood a legend in the first place." Metacritic assigned the film a weighted average score of 53 out of 100, based on 40 critics, indicating "mixed or average reviews". Audiences polled by CinemaScore gave the film an average grade of "B−" on an A+ to F scale.

Roger Ebert of the Chicago Sun-Times gave the film two stars out of four, writing that "little by little, title by title, innocence and joy is being drained out of the movies." Joe Neumaier of the New York Daily News felt that "the problem with Russell Crowe's new take on the legend is that it has one muddy boot in history and the other in fantasy. The middling result is far from a bull's-eye." David Roark of Relevant accused Scott of replacing depth with detail and manipulative themes, like vengeance and unjust war, and stated that Scott had sucked the life out of a cherished fable, writing that "Scott has turned a myth, a concept essentially, into a history which emerges as dry, insensible clutter." Anthony Lane, writing for The New Yorker, found the film "dour and dun", and was critical of Crowe's performance, stating "His Robin, however, seems pathologically glum; even when leading a cavalry charge on a white steed, he cuts a lonesome figure, marooned in his own feuds and ruminations". Owen Gleiberman of Entertainment Weekly was critical of the film not holding any traits of the Robin Hood myth, and said of Scott's direction and Crowe's performance "Scott and Crowe made a great movie out of Gladiator, tapping deep into the showbiz masculine bravura of ancient-world Hollywood spectaculars. In Robin Hood, Scott tries to go deep again, but in a misguided way—he thinks he's making a pop-medieval Saving Private Robin. The battles are grainy and "existential," but what they aren't is thrilling. They're surging crowd scenes with streams of arrows and flecks of blood, and Crowe, slashing his way through them, is a glorified extra. He's so grimly possessed with purpose that he's a bore, and so is the movie."

Among the film's more positive reviews, Mick LaSalle of the San Francisco Chronicle wrote that "Scott has great command of his action sequences" and praised his "sophisticated approach to the material." Ty Burr of The Boston Globe called the film "smart, muscular entertainment" and wrote that Crowe "possesses a presence and authority to make you forget all about Kevin Costner." Though he noted that the film downplayed several characters, Kirk Honeycutt of The Hollywood Reporter was complimentary of the film, praising John Mathieson's cinematography and Marc Streitenfeld's musical score.

Russell Crowe received criticism from the British media for his variable accent during the film. Empire said his accent was occasionally Scottish, while Total Film thought there were also times when it sounded Irish. Mark Lawson, while interviewing Crowe on BBC Radio 4, suggested there were hints of Irish in his accent, which angered Crowe who described this as "bollocks" and stormed out.

A number of reviewers have criticised historical inaccuracies in the film. In The New York Times, A. O. Scott complained that the film made "a hash of the historical record". In The Guardian, Alex von Tunzelmann complained that the film was filled with historical impossibilities and anachronisms. She notes that Richard the Lionheart was indeed fighting in France in 1199, but that he had actually come back from the Holy Land seven years earlier, so it is inaccurate to depict him fighting in France on his way back from the Holy Land in 1199, as is the case in the film.

=== Accolades ===
Year	Award	Category	Recipient	Result	Notes
2010	Satellite Awards	Best Costume Design	Janty Yates	Nominated	
2011	Art Directors Guild Awards	Excellence in Production Design Award – Period Film	Arthur Max	Nominated	
2011	People's Choice Award	Favourite Action Film	Robin Hood	Nominated	
2011	Screen Actors Guild Awards	Stunt Ensemble	Robin Hood	Nominated	
2011	Teen Choice Awards	Choice Movie: Action	Robin Hood	Nominated	
2011	Teen Choice Awards	Choice Movie Action: Action	Russell Crowe	Nominated	
2011	Teen Choice Awards	Choice Actress: Action	Cate Blanchett	Nominated	
2011	Visual Effects Society Awards	Outstanding Supporting Visual Effects in a Feature Motion Picture	Richard Stammers, Allen Maris, Jessica Norman, Max Wood	Nominated	
2011	Saturn Awards	Best Action/Adventure Film	Robin Hood	Nominated	

== Potential sequels ==
Scott indicated he had been considering a further film in an interview with The Times in April 2010, stating, "Let's say we might presume there's a sequel. [...] Honestly, I thought, 'Why not have the potential for a sequel, particularly if it is a genre that you absolutely love and has never been fully explored?' If there were to be a sequel, you would have a constant enemy throughout, King John, and you would follow his reign of 17 years. The signing of Magna Carta could be Robin's final act." In May 2010, while Scott was recovering from a knee operation, Crowe said "There's no sort of cynicism with this, we don't have two other scripts under Ridley's hospital bed [...] Obviously there's a figure in the studio heads' mind, if we pass a certain figure then they'll give us a call and say, 'well, tell the second part of the story', but there's no grand plan in that regard. [...] if I had the opportunity to address what happens next with Ridley and Cate, then great, let's do it."

In February 2026, Crowe looked back at the plans for sequels, saying that at the time the story was meant "To be told in three parts [...] When I started digging in to RH, I found the story and its roots in Greene Man mythology deeply interesting. The tale of Robin lasted hundreds of years, how? It was my idea to show that RH was a title, passed down, not one man."

== See also ==
- List of films and television series featuring Robin Hood
