= The Clanranald Trust for Scotland =

Scottish non-profit organisation

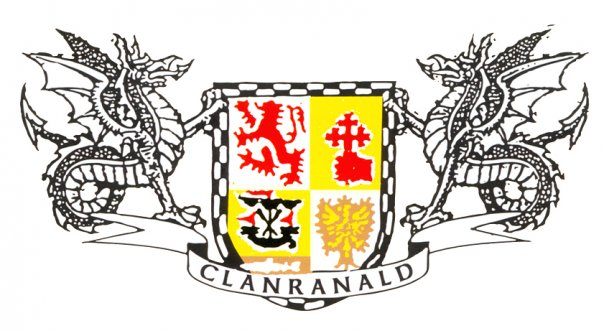
The Clanranald Trust for Scotland's emblem

Arms of Macdonald of Clanranald

The Clanranald Trust for Scotland is a recognised non-profit organisation founded in 1995 and based in Carronvalley, Scotland. Its chairman is Charlie Allan.

== Objectives ==
The prime objectives of the Clanranald Trust for Scotland are the preservation and dissemination of Scottish culture and Scottish heritage through entertainment and education.

=== Activities ===
- Duncarron medieval fort – major construction project: replica of a medieval castle courtyard as a visual interactive visitor attraction
- Educational activities for schools, gala days and public events
- Combat International Team – the official Clanranald fight team for stunt work in film and TV productions
- Additional services to the film industry (actors, fight training, battle choreography, music scoring, video production, etc.)
- Medieval martial arts classes – training on methods of medieval fighting; many members of the class participate in the International Combat Team
- Retailing, costume making and supply, themed room dressing
- Genealogy and Scottish History research services

== History ==
In 1995 the decision was taken to recreate an original medieval village to illustrate the life and the culture of Scotland at that time. The Trust was established and the proceeds and donations taken by the various activities (see above) flow into this project; more than £400,000 has so far been made available for the construction of Duncarron. A big supporter of the charity is the film actor Russell Crowe, a close friend of the chairman Charlie Allan. Crowe donated the battering ram used during the filming of his 2010 version of Robin Hood nicknamed 'Rosie' by the film crew and was worth £60,000, to The Clanranald Trust to be used for battle re-enactments at the completed Duncarron, built in a forest near the Carron Valley Reservoir in North Lanarkshire.
