= Duncarron =

Coordinates: 56.0279°N 4.0555°W

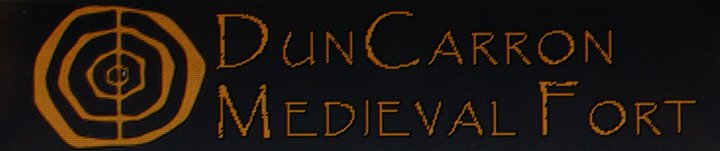
Duncarron
- Location: Carron Valley on the eastern end of the Carron Valley Reservoir, near Stirling, Scotland
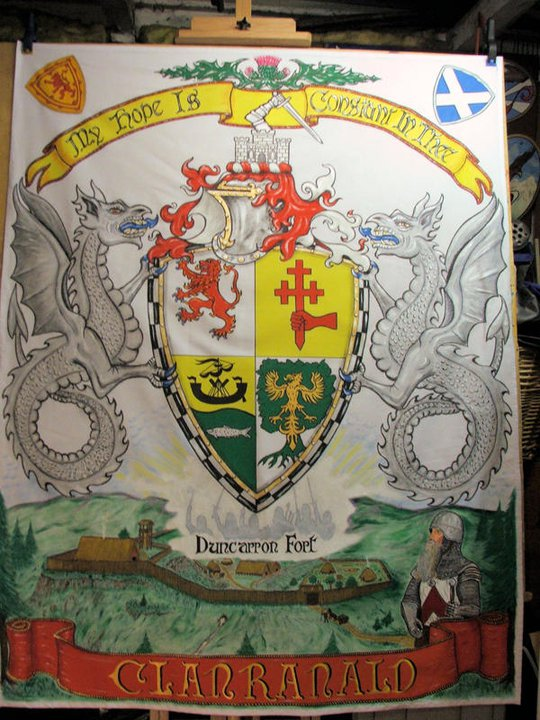
- Flag of The Clanranald Trust for Scotland with illustration of Duncarron Fort

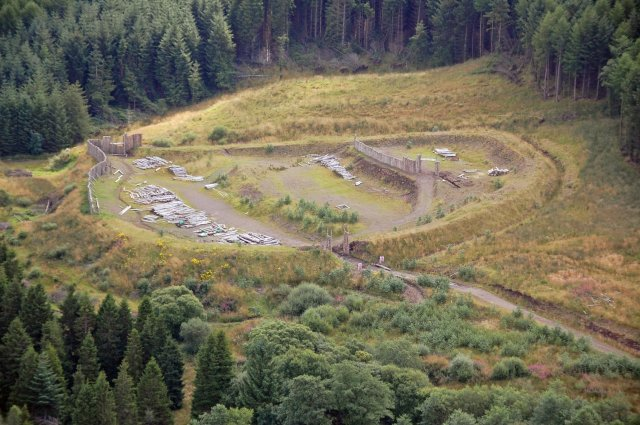
- Aerial photograph of Duncarron site (2008)

Site information
- Type: Fortress
- Owner: The Clanranald Trust for Scotland
- Open to the public: yes

Site history
- Built: 2004-Present

Duncarron is a modern reproduction of a fortified village from the early Middle Ages of Scotland. It is the reconstruction of a typical residence of a Scottish clan chief from the early part of the last millennium. The supporter is the nonprofit organization The Clanranald Trust for Scotland, whose chairman is Charlie Allan. Duncarron is located in the Carron Valley on the eastern end of the Carron Valley Reservoir, near Stirling. The medieval village is being built with the help of volunteers from all walks of life, and is intended to preserve and disseminate Scottish culture and heritage through education, active participation and entertainment.

== History ==
In 1995 the decision was made to recreate an original medieval village in order to illustrate the life and culture of Scotland at that time. The Trust being established, the proceeds and donations raised by various activities, Combat International, Scottish Federation of Medieval Martial Arts (SFMMA) contributed to this project. This has so far enabled over £1,900,000 to be made available for the construction of Duncarron.

Planning for the project began in 1996. Experts, such as archaeologists, historians and architects, were called in to help create an authentic appearance of the village. At the same time a suitable location was eventually found in the Carron Valley. Big support was given by film actor Russell Crowe, a close friend of chairman Charlie Allan. He presented the village with a battering ram from the film Robin Hood in the value of £60,000. This prop is exhibited in Duncarron since 2010.

A grand opening was scheduled to take place on 18/19 May 2019.

== Description ==
Construction work began in 2004. Previously, a visitor centre and facilities for the volunteers was built. In August 2011 the construction of the Palisade was completed. In September 2012 the construction of the Longhouse was completed.

In planning are a Chief's house, a dwelling Roundhouse, another Gatehouse, a Forge and a medieval kitchen with a herb garden, as well as a motte and bailey which are typical of a clan chief's residence. As of 2020 work continues on two smaller houses and a 10-metre lookout tower.

The operators offer events, tours, medieval banquets, and a location for film sets as well as for weddings and other ceremonies.

== Photographs ==
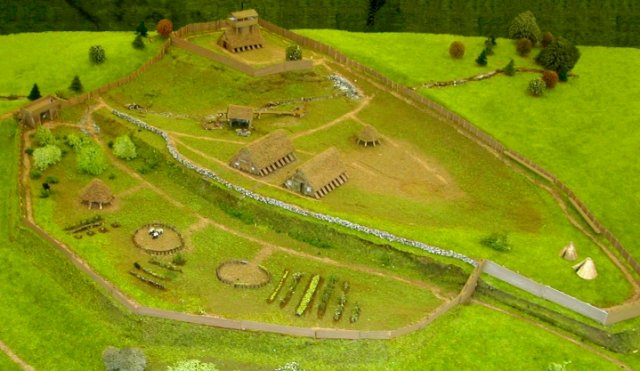
Model of Duncarron

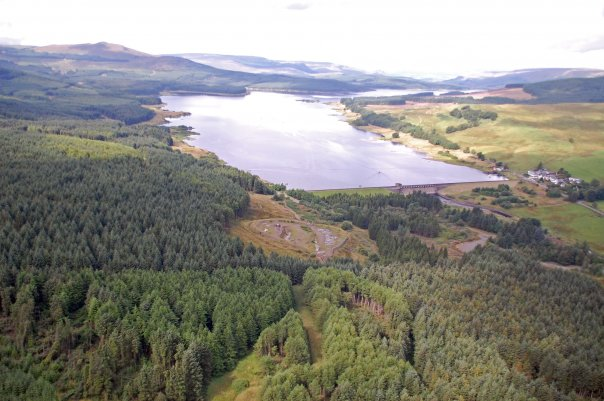
Aerial photograph of Duncarron with the Carron-Valley-Reservoir in background (2008)

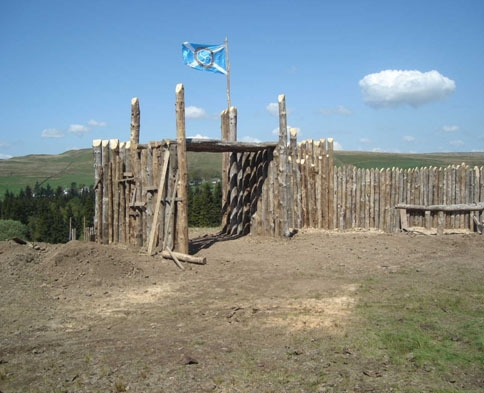
Fort construction (2010)

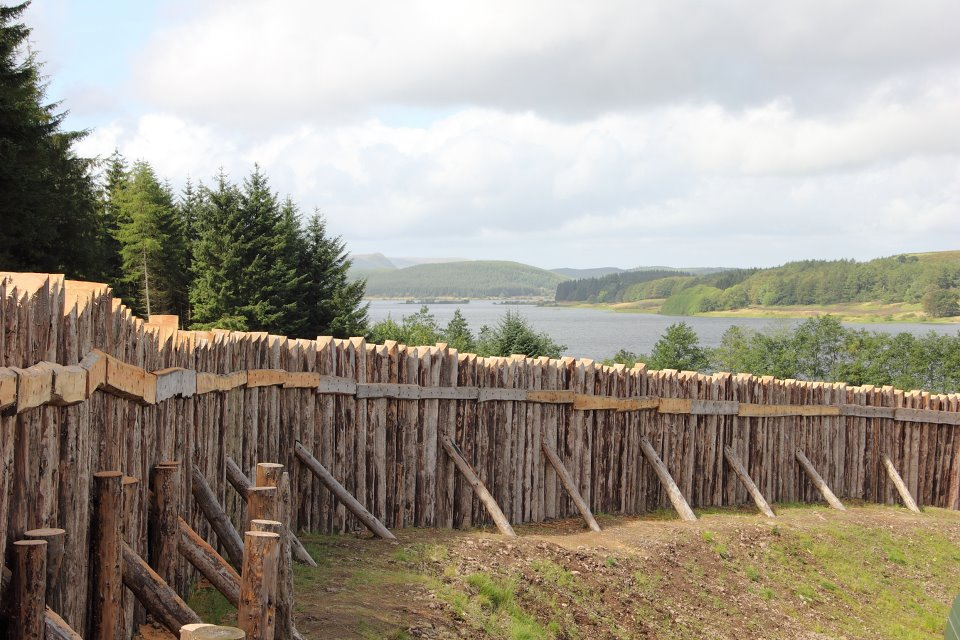
Palisades (2011)

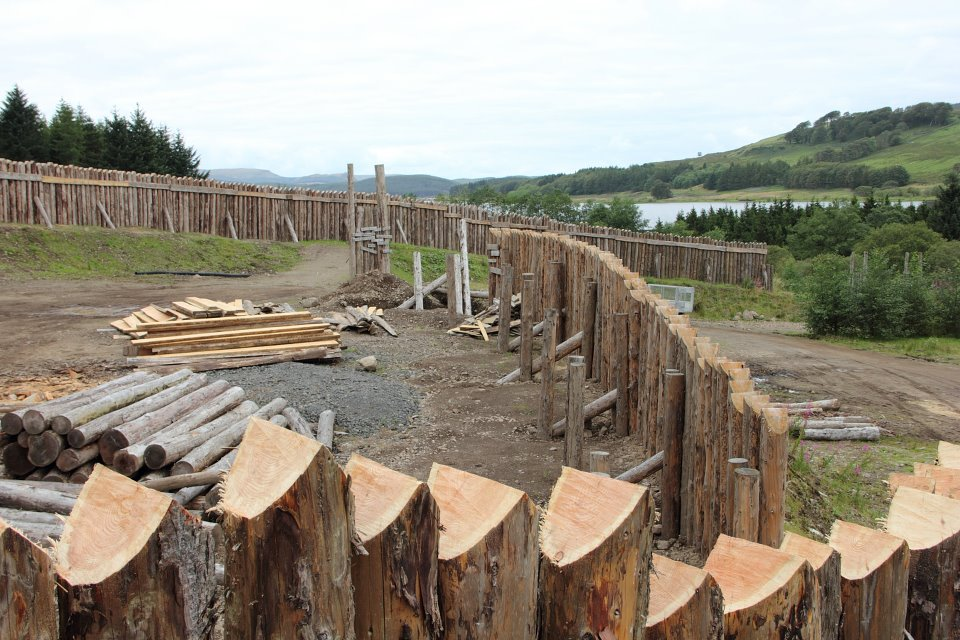
Palisade of the Clan-Chiefs area (2011)

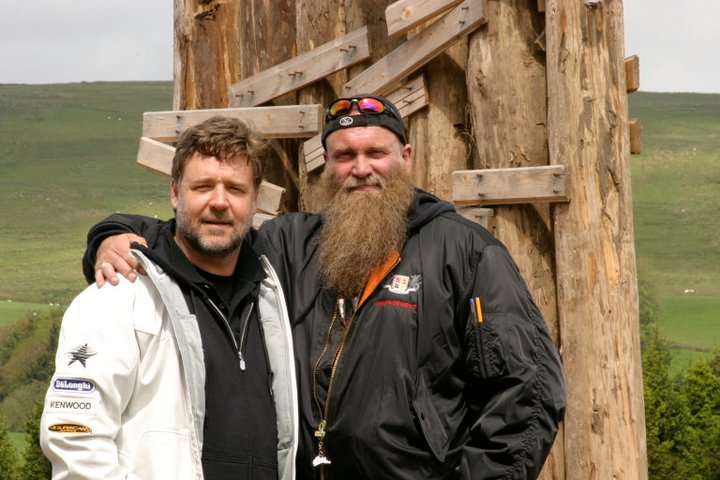
Russell Crowe as a guest of Charlie Allan in Duncarron (2011)

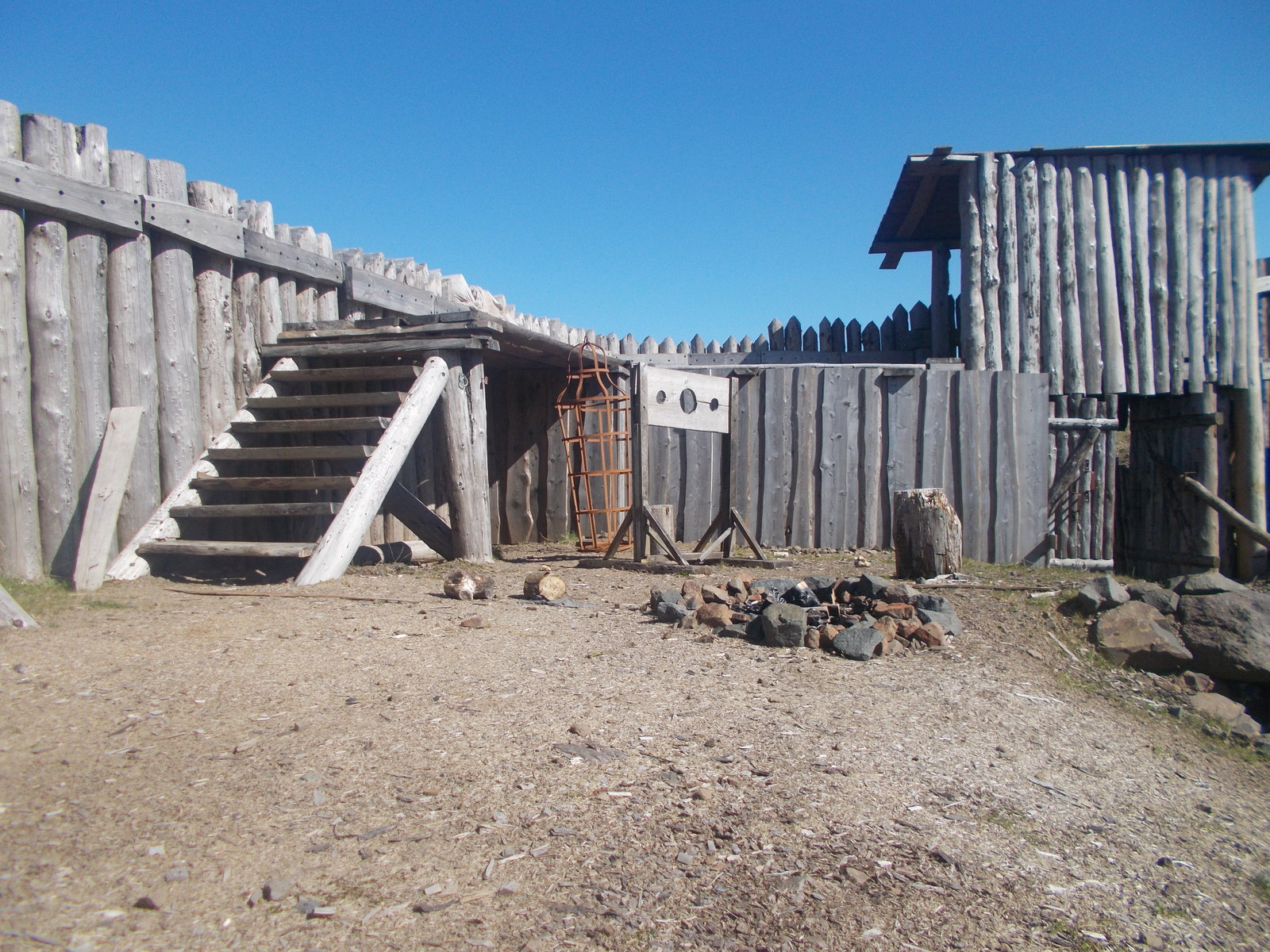
Duncarron Fort (2015)

== See also ==
- Guédelon a 13th-century château built in France since 1996
- Campus Galli a Carolingian monastery built in Germany since 2013
