= Campus Galli =

Carolingian monastic community under construction in Germany

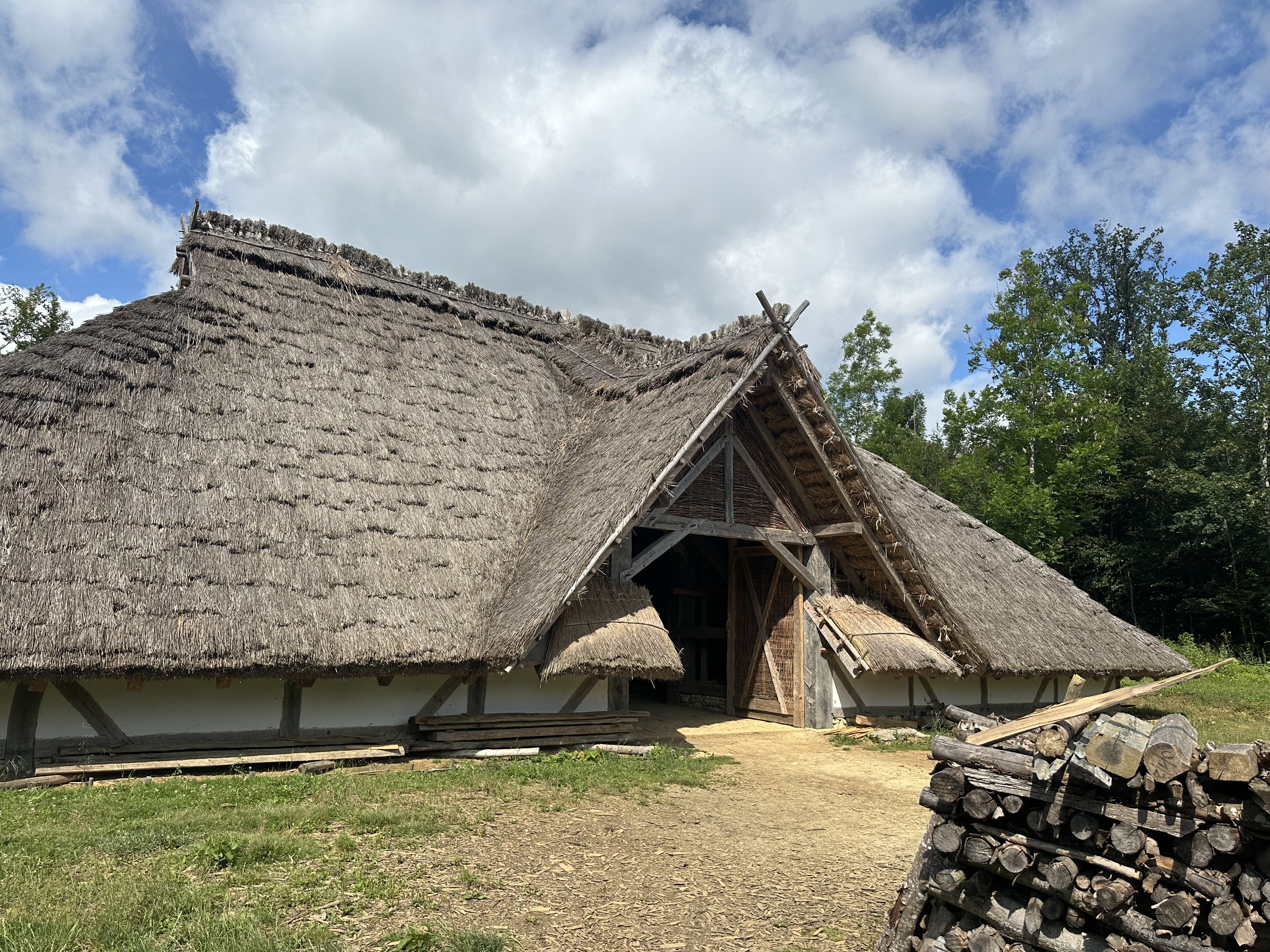
- Barn (2024)

- Location within Baden-Württemberg Location within Germany

General information
- Status: Under construction
- Location: Four kilometres north of Meßkirch, Baden-Württemberg, Germany
- Coordinates: 48°02′01″N 9°06′32″E
- Year built: 2013–Present
- Construction started: 2013

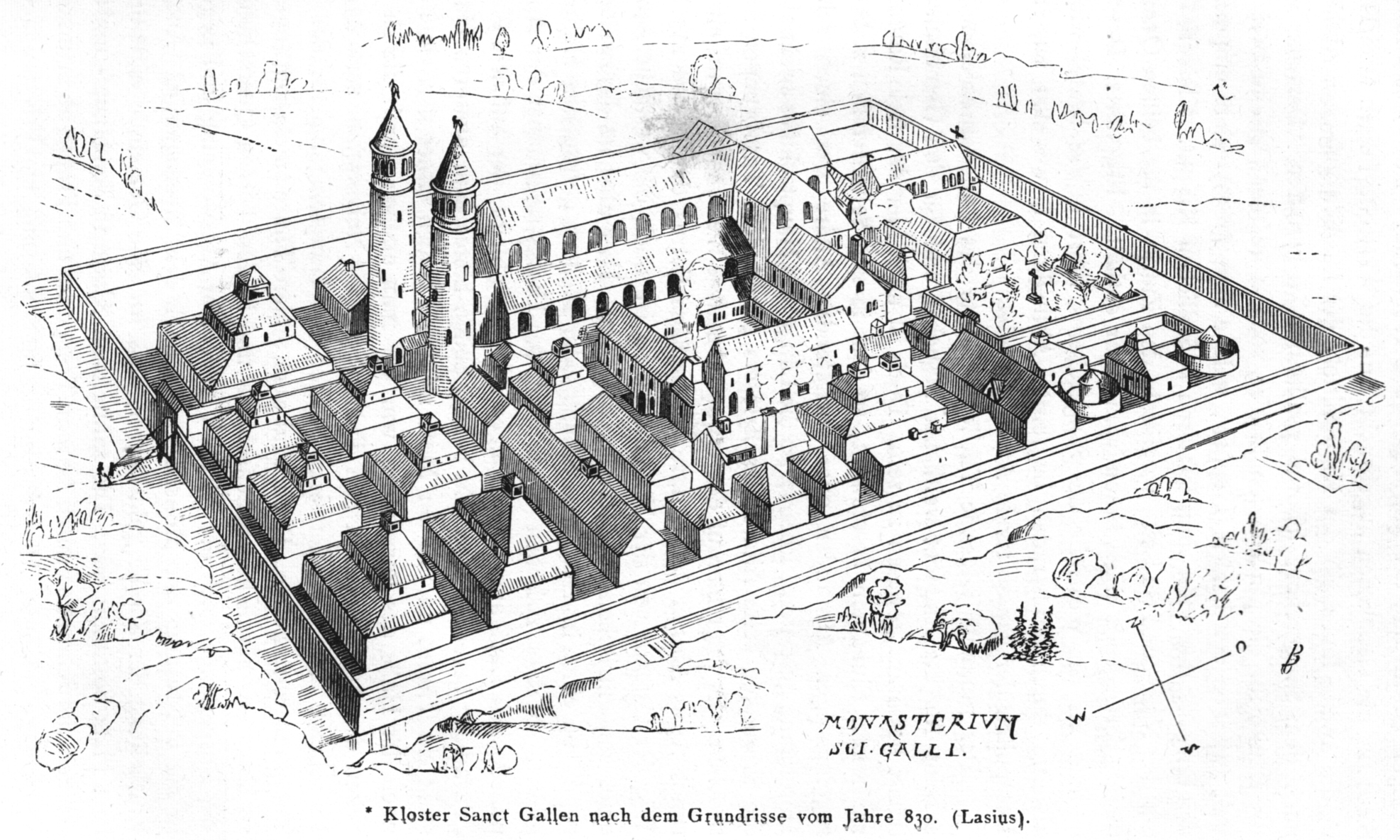
Artist's rendition of the Plan of Saint Gall

Campus Galli is a Carolingian monastic community under construction in Meßkirch, Baden-Württemberg, Germany. The construction project includes plans to build a medieval monastery according to the early ninth-century Plan of Saint Gall using techniques from that era. The long-term financing of the project comes from revenue generated from the site's operation as a tourist attraction. The construction site has been open for visitors since June 2013.

== Construction site ==
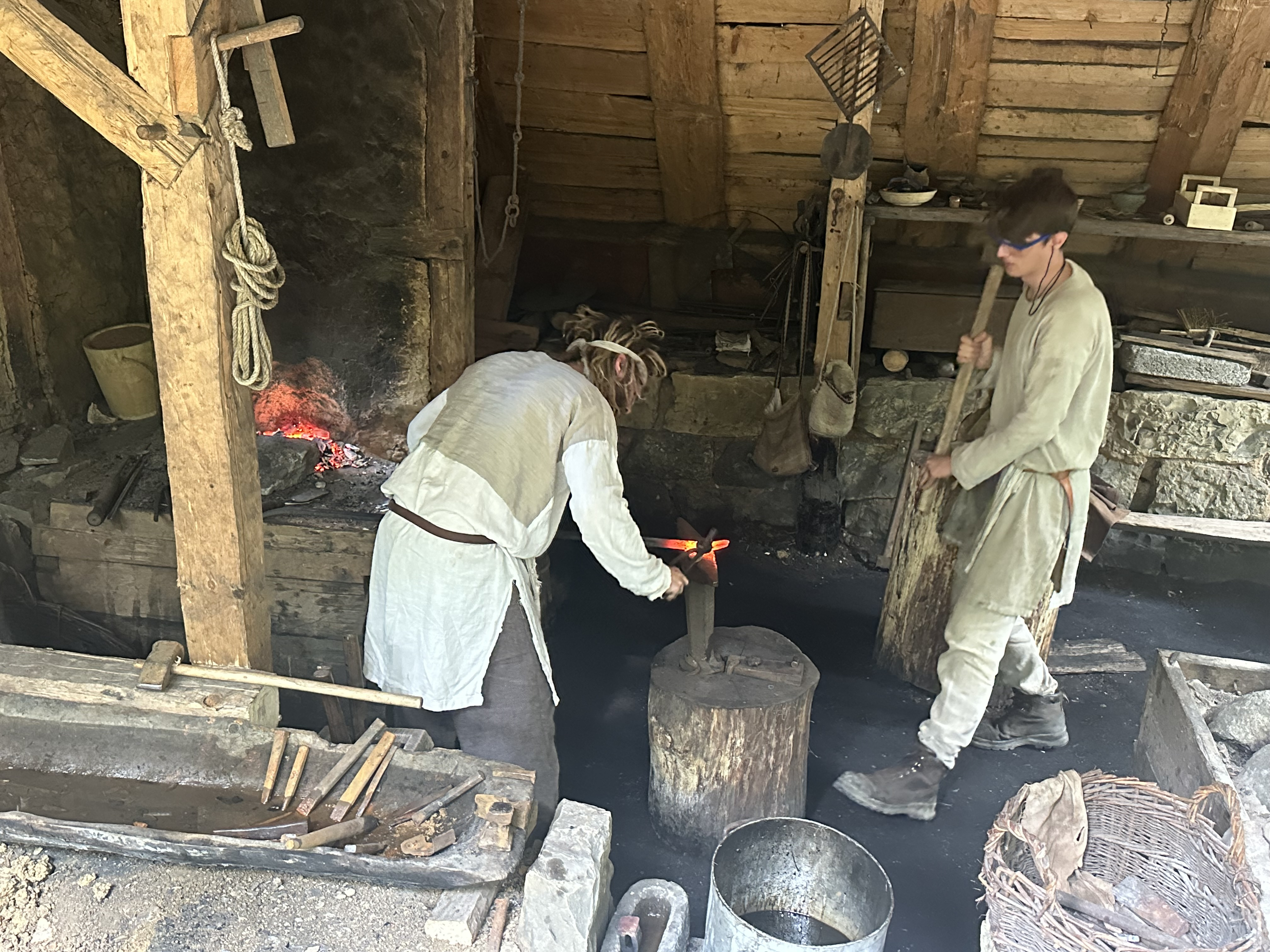
Blacksmith's hut (2024)

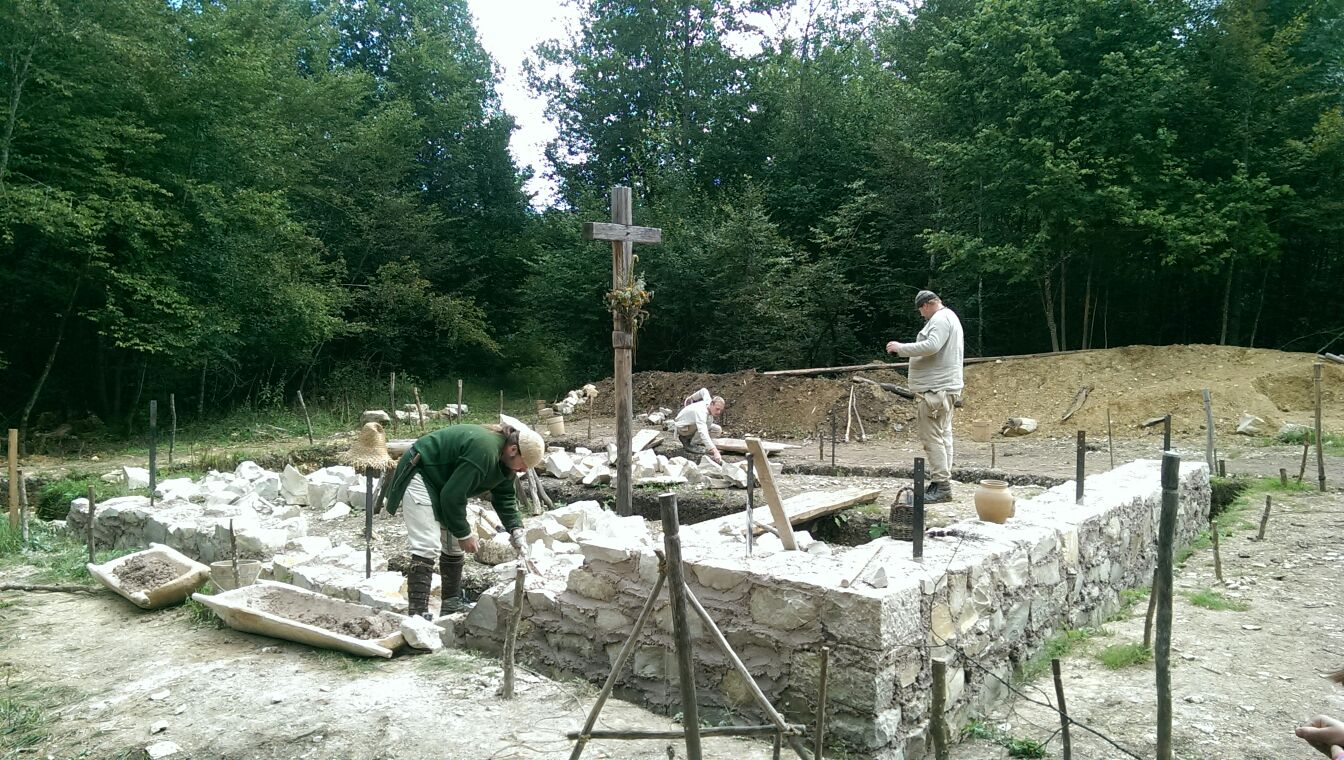
Chapel Building, August 2014

The Carolingian monastery town is located in a wooded area approximately four kilometers north of the small town of Meßkirch in southern Germany. The buildings follow the designs in the Plan of Saint Gall, the only surviving major architectural drawing from the Middle Ages, and uses as much as possible the materials and methods contemporary to the time of Charlemagne in keeping with goals of experimental archaeology. The major raw materials, such as wood and stone, are obtained from the site.

Between 20 and 30 staff members are permanently at the site, with an exception according to medieval custom for rest during the winter months from 11 November (St. Martin's day) until 2 April (Charlemagne's birthday). The total construction time is estimated at forty years. Volunteer workers not only help with the construction, but also act as costumed interpreters.

The project was launched by the Aachen-based journalist Bert Geurten with 1 million euros provided by city, state and European-Union sources. An Advisory Board of 18 experts in fields including archaeology, history, theology, and veterinary medicine provide the scientific management and monitoring of the construction.

== Construction progress ==
A small area in the forest was cleared by the end of June 2013, and temporary shelters for the craftsmen were built. A map of the site shows areas for carpenters, basket weavers, potters, blacksmiths, stonemasons, wood turners, broom makers, roofers, textile workers, and rope makers. There are also pens for pigs, goats and sheep, and a chicken coop, along with a bee hive. There is also a herb garden for medicinal plants.

=== Wooden church ===
The construction of a wooden church was started in 2014, and the main structure was completed in 2015. Construction continues on the interior and details of the exterior.

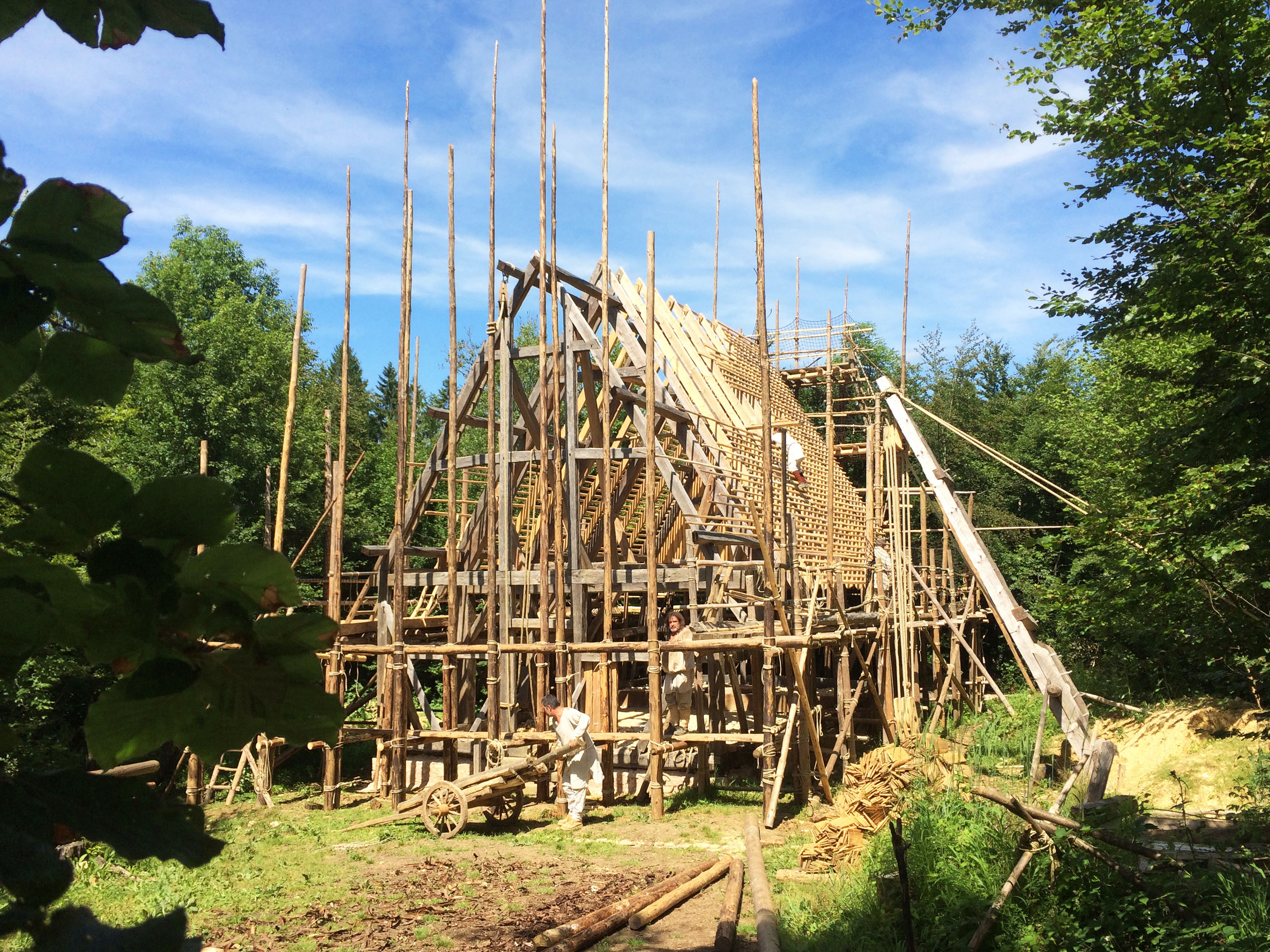
July 2016

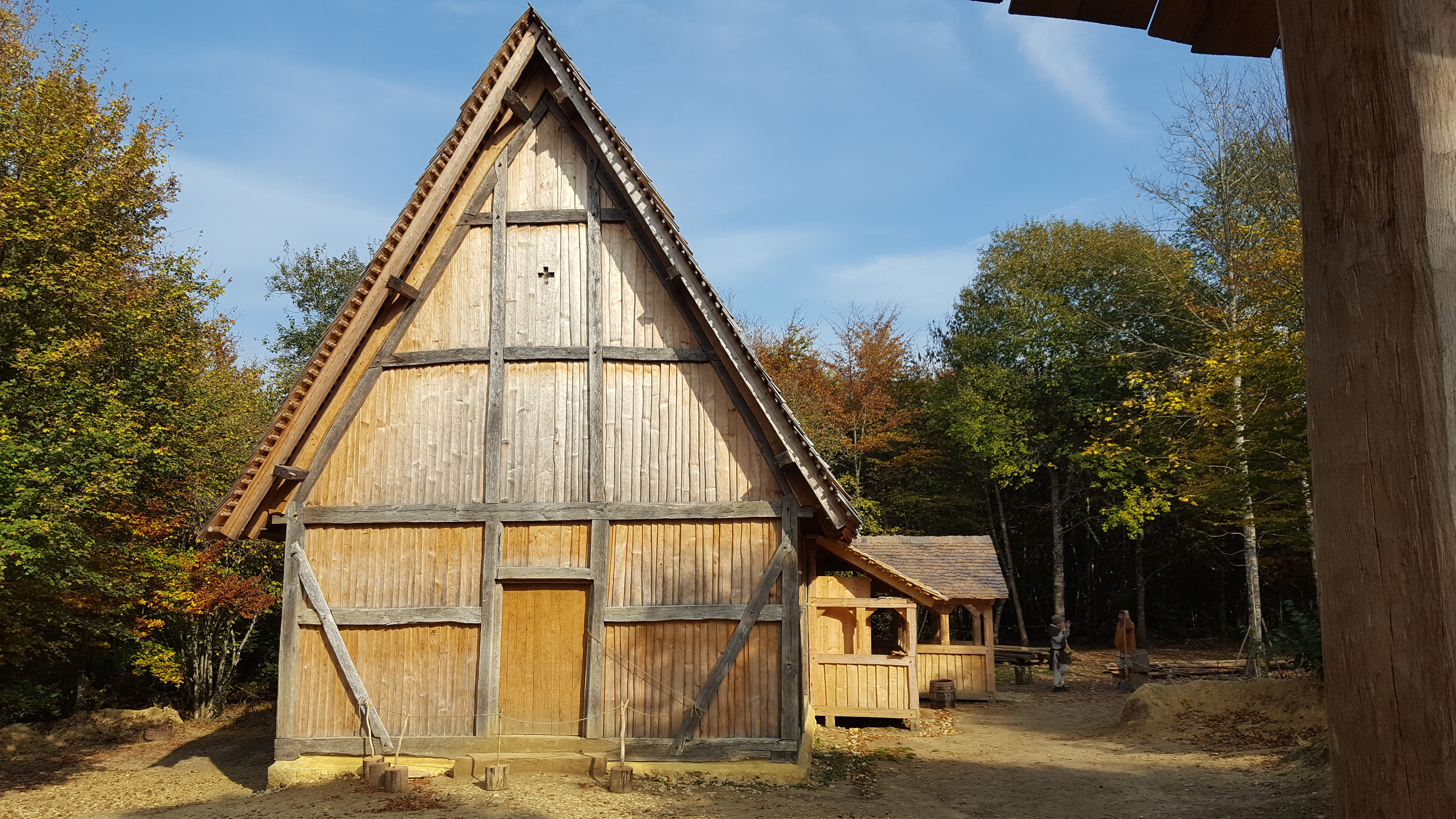
October 2018

== Scholarly research ==
On 20 April 2018, the Campus Galli was officially named 'teaching and research site of the University of Tübingen'. The production of ceramics and also the production and processing of mortars using medieval methods at Campus Galli are of interest to the Competence Center Archaeometry Baden-Wuerttemberg (CCA-BW). Mineralogical investigations can establish the connection between archaeological finds and materials produced according to traditional methods. Archaeological experiments on ceramic firing and joint courses for students of archaeology will also be conducted as part of the cooperation.

== See also ==
- Duncarron in Scotland, a reconstruction of a typical residence of a Scottish clan chief from the early part of the last millennium
- Guédelon Castle in France, an authentic construction of a medieval castle in Treigny
