= Byzantine Church of Khirbet et-Tireh =

Archaeological site in West Bank, Palestine

- Location within the West Bank
- 31°54′49″N 35°10′59″E
- Type: Church
- Periods: Byzantine, Umayyad
- Location: Khirbet et-Tireh, Ramallah, West Bank, Palestine

History
- Built: 4th/5th century
- Abandoned: 8th century

Site notes
- Excavation dates: 2013
- Archaeologists: Salah Hussein A. Al-Houdalieh

The Byzantine Church of Khirbet et-Tireh is the archaeological site of a ruined church located 2 kilometres (1.2 mi) west of the city of Ramallah in Palestine. The church was established in the 4th or 5th century, continued in use through the Umayyad period, and fell out of use after the mid-8th century. Parts of the building were still standing in the 19th century. It was excavated by archaeologists from Al-Quds University in 2013.

== Location ==
Khirbet et-Tireh is a historic settlement covering about 3 hectares (7.4 acres). An ancient road ran through the area, indirectly connecting Khirbet et-Tireh to Jerusalem in the south and the Mediterranean coast to the west. Khirbet et-Tireh is 2 kilometres (1.2 mi) west of the centre of Ramallah, and the site of the Byzantine church is on the south side of the settlement, inside the town wall. There were two Byzantine churches active at the same time in the settlement.

== History ==
Khirbet et-Tireh was inhabited in the Roman and Byzantine periods, and again in the Ottoman period. Along with the church, during the Byzantine period the settlement of Khirbet et-Tireh had a villa, a reservoir, fortifications, burial caves, and a monastery.

The church was established in the late 4th or 5th century. If activity at the site pre-dated this it was lost when the church was established as it was built on bedrock. Through the period of its use, the church was adapted and at one point an entrance on the east side was blocked. The church was used until the mid-8th century. The dating was based on the recovery of Byzantine and early Islamic pottery at the site. The 749 Galilee earthquake probably damaged the church, as evidenced by destruction layers at the site.

== Investigations and later history ==
French amateur archaeologist Victor Guérin visited Khirbet et-Tireh in 1863, at which point part of the church's apse was still standing. He noted that stone from the church had been reused (as process known as spoliation) in local construction. Later that century Marie-Joseph Lagrange, the founder of the École Biblique, visited the site and noted the presence of mosaics. German archaeologist Alfons Maria Schneider visited Khirbet et-Tireh in the 1930s and surveyed the ruins of the church; by that stage the west wall had been removed. Column bases were still visible, though their capitals did not survive in situ.

Archaeologist Salah H. Al-Houdalieh estimates that three-quarters of the church's archaeological remains have been lost to urban development and looting, including stones being removed to build the local Greek Orthodox church in the mid 19th century. There was illicit digging on the site of the church in the 1980s.

In 2013, the Greek Orthodox Patriarchate of Jerusalem commissioned an archaeological excavation at the church. Salah Hussein A. Al-Houdalieh of Al-Quds University led a team of 29 people excavating 400 square metres (4,300 sq ft) which encompassed adjacent structures: parts of a villa, monastery, and residential buildings, the latter dating from the Umayyad period. It was part of a multi-year project which found a second Byzantine church to the east.

== Layout ==
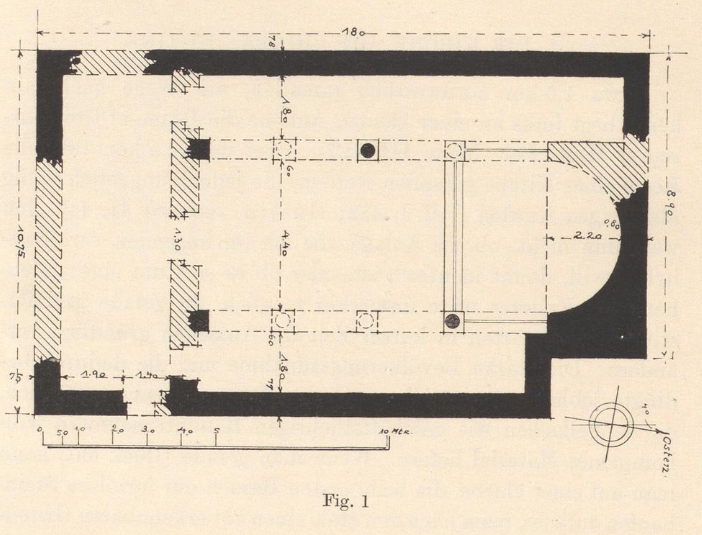
A plan of the church as prepared by Alfons Maria Schneider in the 1930s

The church was oriented west to east, with the altar at the east end. The stone-built church was laid out in the style of a basilica, with a central nave flanked by two aisles; at the west end was a narthex or entrance chamber leading into the main part of the church. The walls are about 90 centimetres (35 in) thick and the church measures 18 by 10.75 metres (59.1 by 35.3 ft) externally. The main building stone used was limestone. The church interior was paved with mosaics, though were badly damaged by spoliation and looting in the 19th and 20th centuries.

== Bibliography ==
- Al-Houdalieh, Salah H. (2014). "The Byzantine Church of Khirbet et-Tireh". Journal of Eastern Mediterranean Archaeology and Heritage Studies. 2 (3): 188–208. doi:10.5325/jeasmedarcherstu.2.3.0188. JSTOR 10.5325/jeasmedarcherstu.2.3.0188.
- Al-Houdalieh, Salah H. (2016). "A Clay Bread Stamp from Khirbet et-Tireh". Near Eastern Archaeology. 79 (4): 272–275. doi:10.5615/neareastarch.79.4.0272. JSTOR 10.5615/neareastarch.79.4.0272.
- Schneider, Alfons Maria (1934). "Zu einigen Kirchenruinen Palästinas". Oriens Christianus: Hefte für die Kunde des christlichen Orients (in German). 31 (2): 219–225. doi:10.71684/ORCHR.V31I2.102740.
