= Willington Waggonway =

Former waggonway in Tyneside

The Willington Waggonway was constructed in 1795 to carry coal from Tyneside mines to the river. It was rediscovered in 2013 during archaeological work being carried out prior to redevelopment of the former Neptune shipyard in Walker due to its proximity to the Roman fort, Segedunum. Well preserved under compacted coal waste was part of the most complete and complex 18th century waggonway ever found.
