= French ship Beaumont (Acadian transport) =

History

France
- Name: Beaumont

General characteristics
- Tons burthen: 180

The Beaumont was a 180-ton ship. Leaving Nantes, France on June 11, 1785, under the command of Captain Daniel, it transported 178 Acadians to New Orleans, Louisiana, arriving August 19, 1785.
