= French ship Beaumont (1762) =

French ship of the line

History

French East India Company
- Name: Beaumont
- Builder: Caro at Lorient, Brittany
- Laid down: March 1762
- Acquired: 19 August 1762
- Commissioned: December 1762
- Stricken: July 1770
- Fate: Taken into service with the French Navy

France
- Name: Beaumont
- In service: July 1770
- Out of service: 1772
- Fate: Sold to French citizen and renamed Lyon, captured by Royal Navy 1778 and presumed wrecked in dock at Antigua

General characteristics
- Displacement: 1,600 tonneaux
- Tons burthen: 900 port tonneaux
- Length: At gundeck: 47.098 m (154 ft 6.3 in); At keel: 40.929 m (134 ft 3.4 in)
- Beam: 12.045 m (39 ft 6.2 in)
- Depth: 4.588 m (15 ft 0.6 in)
- Propulsion: Sails
- Sail plan: Full-rigged ship
- Armament: 56 guns

Beaumont was a French ship built in 1762 for the French East India Company (FEIC). Intended for carrying trade from the Indian and Pacific Oceans, she was heavily armed. When the FEIC was dissolved in 1769 the Beaumont was taken into service with the French Navy, as a fourth-rate ship-of-the-line. She was sold out of service in 1772 and renamed the Lyon. Owned by a private citizen the Lyon provided support to the rebels during the American War of Independence and was captured by the British frigate Maidstone in 1778. Heavily damaged, she was taken to the Royal Navy dockyard in Antigua where she is believed to have sunk. A wreck was discovered in the dock in 2013 and a 2021 survey found it matched the dimensions of the Beaumont.

== Service history ==
The Beaumont was built by Caro at Lorient, Brittany, for the French East India Company (FEIC). She was similar in design to the East Indiamen Villevault and Pondichéry. Beaumont's keel was laid down in March 1762 and she was acquired by the FEIC on 19 August and commissioned into their service in December. She measured 126' 4" in length at the gundeck (in French feet, equivalent to 47.098 metres, 154 ft 6.3 in imperial), 126' 4" length at the keel (40.929 metres, 134 ft 3.4 in imperial), 37' in breadth (12.045 metres, 39 ft 6.2 in imperial) and 14' 6" in depth (4.588 metres, 15 ft 0.6 in imperial). Beaumont's displacement was 900 tons burthen. Intended for use as a merchantman she was nevertheless heavily armed for the France to Indian Ocean and Pacific Ocean trades.

The FEIC was dissolved in 1769 and in July of the following year Beaumont became a vessel of the French Navy. In naval service she was ship-rigged and, mounting 56 guns, was classified as a fourth-rate (a deuxième rang in the French classification system).

Beaumont left naval service in 1772, being sold to a private citizen and renamed Lyon. Lyon saw service in the American War of Independence and was captured, while acting in support of the rebels, by the British frigate Maidstone in 1778. The badly damaged Lyon was taken to the Royal Navy dockyard in Antigua. Her later fate is not known but she is unlikely to have ever left the dock and is likely to have been stripped down before she was wrecked. This theory is supported by a 1780 map of Antigua which implied the presence of a French Navy vessel, shipwrecked in the harbour.

== Supposed wreck ==
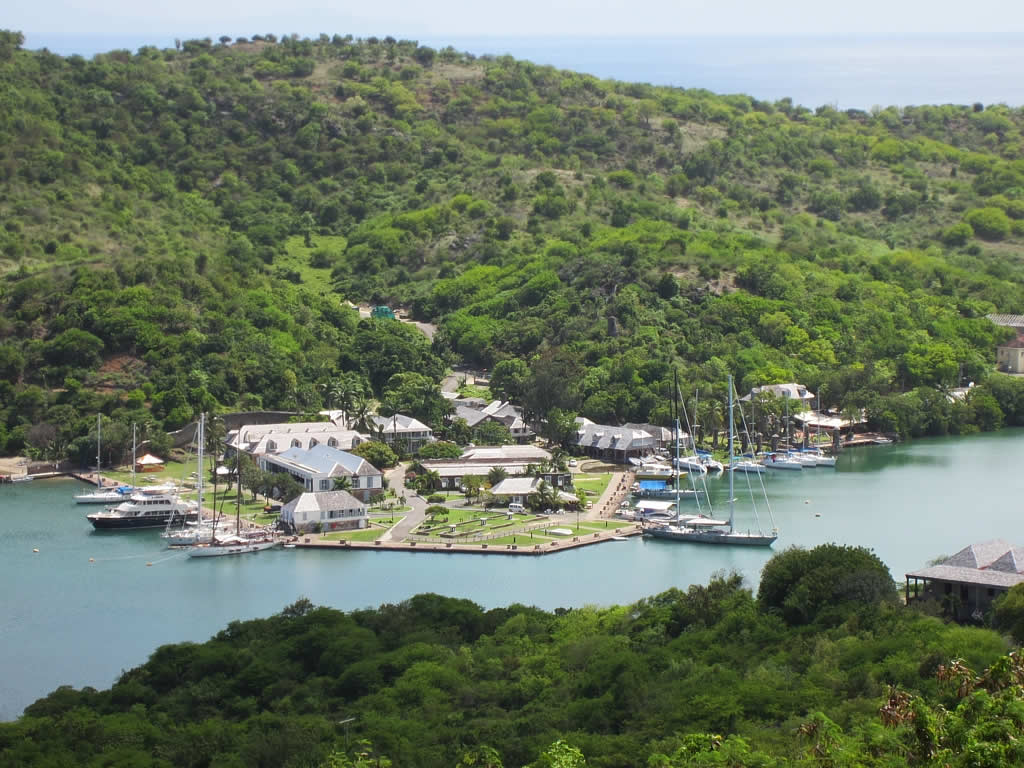
The former Royal Navy dockyard at Antigua, the entrance is to the left of this photograph

The wreck of the Beaumont/Lyon was long suspected to lie within the mud on the bed of Antigua dockyard. A hydrographic survey carried out in 2013 supported this hypothesis. Later that year local diver Maurice Belgrave found the timbers of a ship in the mud while carrying out the routine cleaning of an anchor chain. The wreck lay 8 feet (2.4 m) below water level in the Tank Bay part of the dockyard, close to its entrance.

The wreck remained uninvestigated until 2021 when an archaeological expedition was funded by the governments of France and Martinique and by the American Richard Lounsbery Foundation. After six days of investigation the expedition confirmed the discovery of the 40-metre (130 ft) long wreck of an 18th-century timber vessel. The identification of the vessel was not confirmed but its dimensions are consistent with those of the Beaumont. If confirmed the wreck would be the only one known of an FEIC vessel with an intact hull. The wreck has been deemed too costly and difficult to raise but some artefacts of its timbers and ballast have been recovered.
