= Mauer 1 =

Oldest-known human fossil found in Germany

Coordinates: 49.348558°N 8.800694°E

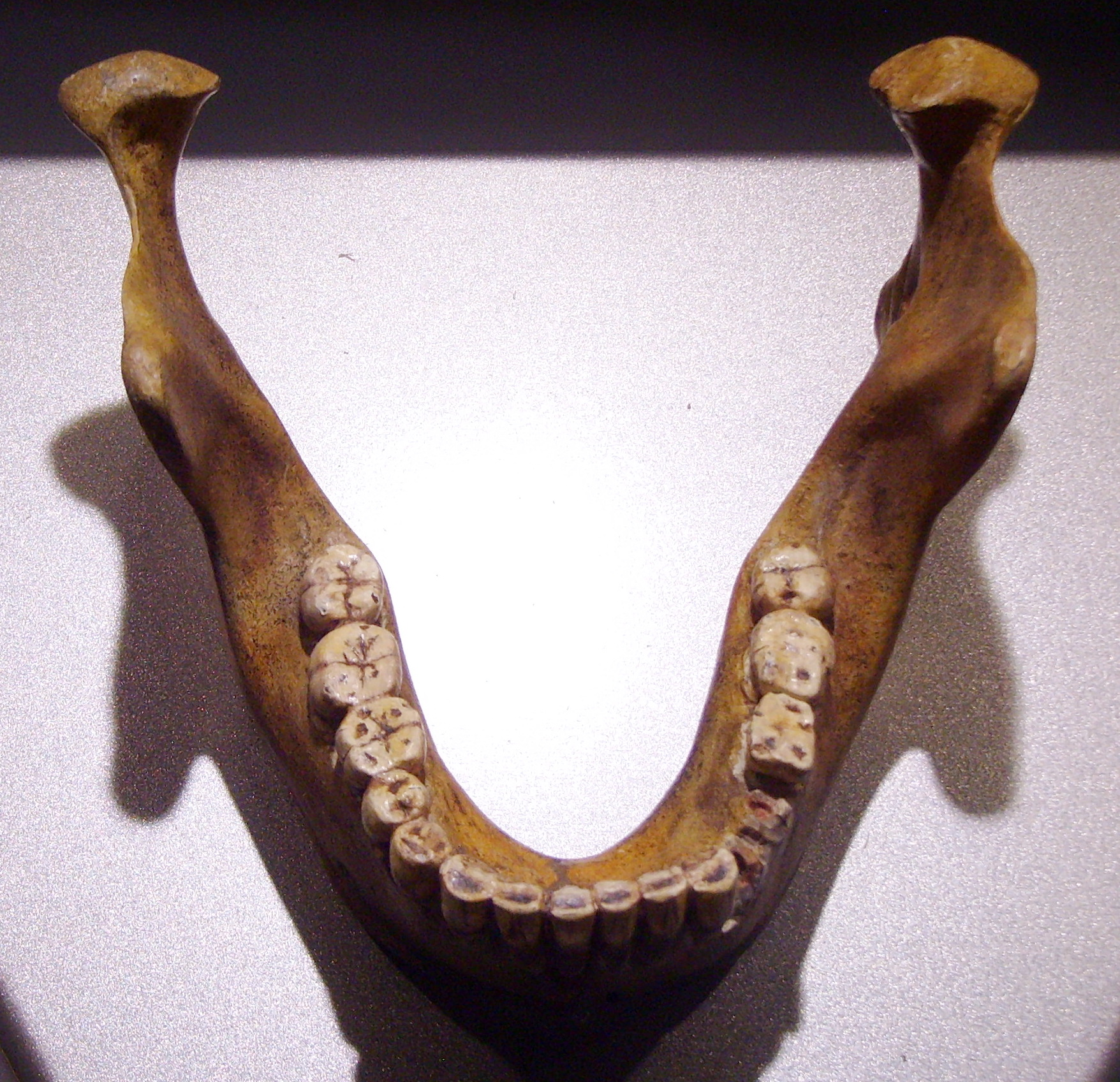
- Catalog no.: GPIH 1
- Common name: Mauer 1
- Species: Homo heidelbergensis
- Age: 609,000 ± 40,000 years
- Place discovered: Mauer, Germany
- Date discovered: October 21, 1907
- Discovered by: Daniel Hartmann

The Mauer 1 mandible is the oldest-known specimen of the genus Homo in Germany. It was found in 1907 in a sand quarry in the community of Mauer, around 10 km (6.2 mi) south-east of Heidelberg. The Mauer 1 mandible is the type specimen of the species Homo heidelbergensis. Some European researchers have classified the find as Homo erectus heidelbergensis, regarding it as a subspecies of Homo erectus. In 2010 the mandible's age was for the first time exactly determined to be 609,000 ± 40,000 years. Previously, specialist literature had referred to an age of either 600,000 or 500,000 years on the basis of less accurate dating methods.

== Discovery ==
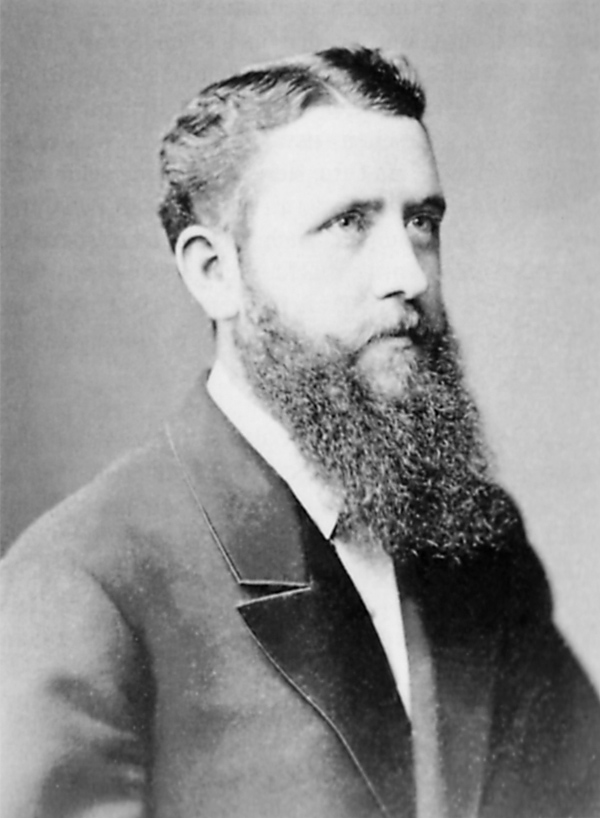
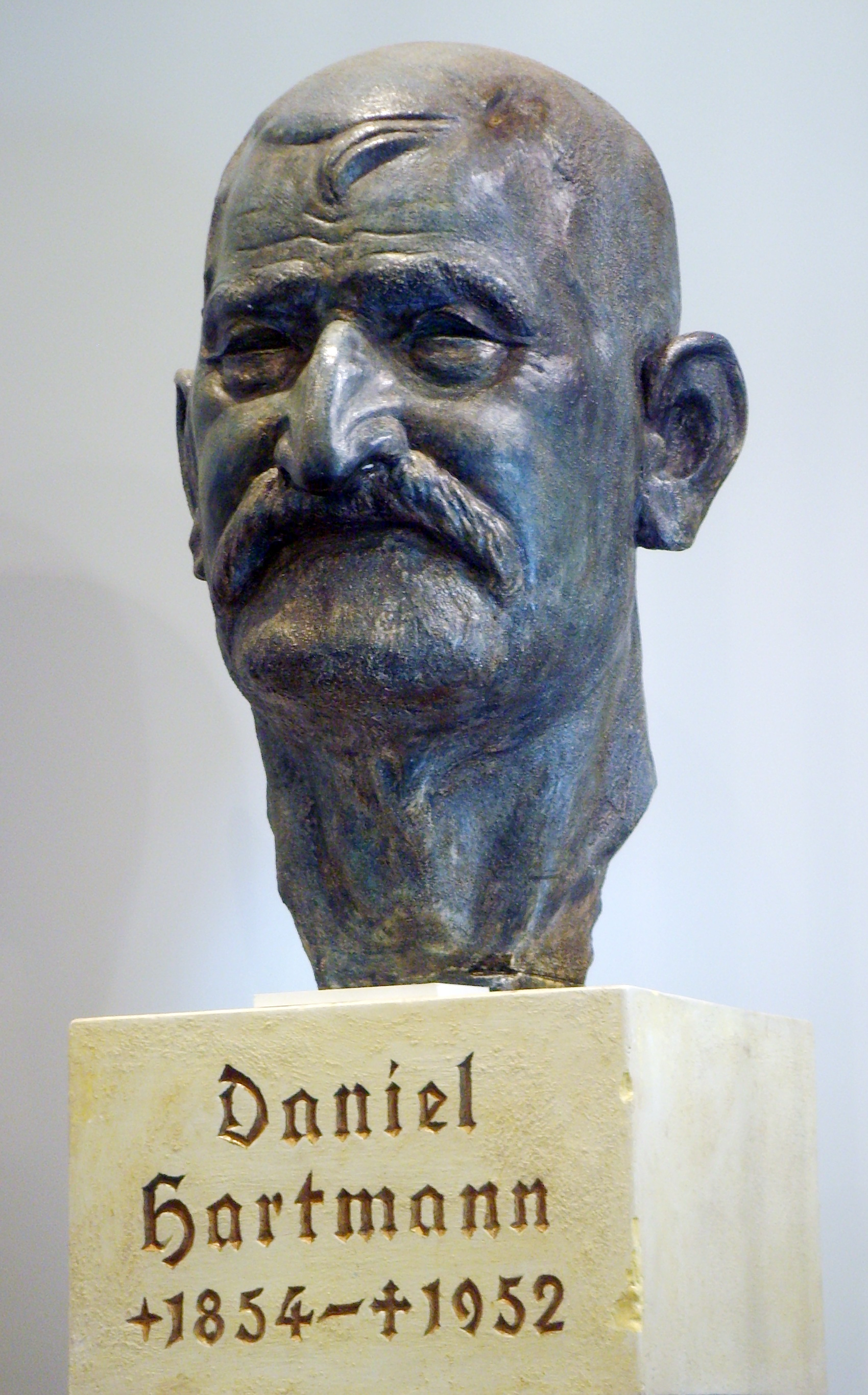
Otto Schoetensack and Daniel Hartmann

On October 21, 1907, Daniel Hartmann, a worker at a sand mine in the Grafenrain open-field system of the Mauer community unearthed a mandible at a depth of 24.63 m (80.81 ft), which he recognized as of human origin, saying that he found Adam. He was aware of the likelihood of finds, as for 20 years the Heidelberg scholar Otto Schoetensack had asked that the workers at the sand mine be encouraged to look out for fossils, after the well-preserved skull of a straight-tusked elephant had come to light there in 1887. Schoetensack had the workers taught the characteristics of human bones based on recent examples on his regular visits to the sand mine in search for "traces of mankind".

As it was dug out, the mandible was flung in the air and only discovered after it had broken into two parts. A piece of the left side of the mandible broke off in the process and was never found. A thick cemented crust of coarse sand stuck on and around the canines and molars—a characteristic of many of the Mauer fossils. The cementing had been caused by carbonation of calcium. A chunk of limestone, probably Muschelkalk, 6 cm (2.4 in) long and about 4 cm (1.6 in) wide was firmly stuck to the sand crust on top of the bicuspids and the two frontal molars on the left side of the mandible.

The contractor at the sand mine immediately reported the discovery to Schoetensack, who examined and documented the site and the fossil. He presented the results of his studies in autumn the following year in a monograph titled: "The lower jaw of Homo heidelbergensis from the sands of Mauer near Heidelberg". On November 19, 1907, Schoetensack stated in a legal document that mine contractor Josef Rösch had given the specimen to the Heidelberg University as a gift. The mandible remains in the university's Geological-Palaeontological Institute to this day as "the most valuable object in the natural history collections of the University of Heidelberg".

Further finds from the Mauer sand mine are the Hornstein artefacts, unearthed in 1924 by Karl Friedrich Hormuth, which scholars interpreted as tools of Homo heidelbergensis. In 1933 Wilhelm Freudenberg discovered a frontal bone fragment which has also been associated with Homo heidelbergensis.

== Description of the fossil ==
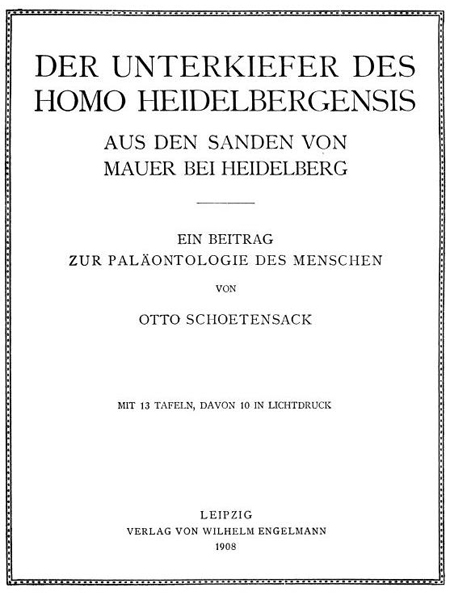
Title page of the original species description

The anatomical analysis of the lower jaw of Mauer in its 1908 original species description by Otto Schoetensack was based largely on the expertise of Breslau professor Hermann Klaatsch, which was only hinted at in a brief acknowledgement in the preface. In his original species description Schoetensack wrote that the "nature of our object" reveals itself "at first sight" since "a certain disproportion between the jaw and the teeth" is obvious: "The teeth are too small for the bone. The available space would allow for a far greater flexibility of development."

And further, on the find:

It shows a combination of features, that has been previously found neither on a recent nor on a fossilized human mandible. Even the scholar should not be blamed if he would only reluctantly accept it as human: Entirely missing is the one feature, which is regarded as particularly human, namely an outer projection of the chin portion, yet this deficiency is found to be combined with extremely strange dimensions of the mandibular body. The actual proof that we are dealing with human remains here only lies within the nature of the dentition. The completely preserved teeth bear the stamp human as evidence: The canines show no trace of a stronger expression in relation to the other groups of teeth. They suggest a moderate and harmonious co-evolution, as it is the case in recent humans.

The characteristics of the lower jaw are therefore the lack of a chin on the one hand and on the other it is the considerable size of the lower jaw bone, on which, behind the wisdom tooth a fourth premolar would easily have had space to develop. Since the third molar (the wisdom tooth) is present and its dentin exposed—although only in a few places—the age of death is estimated to be about 20 to 30 years.

Schoetensack concluded a relationship to modern man (Homo sapiens) from the similarity of the dentition and put the lower jaw in the genus Homo—a view that is still being held unanimously by today's palaeo-anthropologists. He derived the authority to define a new species with the type-epithet heidelbergensis from the fact that the lower jaw—in contrast to modern humans—is missing its chin. With the subtitle of his original description—"A contribution to the paleontology of the human species"—Schoetensack explicitly takes a clear position on the part of Darwinism "in the great debate on the origin of man, namely, that humans have evolved from the animal kingdom and are not the product of a singular act of creation." As to the lower jaw of Mauer's precise position in the ancestral chain of modern man Schoetensack expressed only cautious statements. Reluctantly he wrote in his study that "it seems possible that Homo heidelbergensis belongs in the ancestral series of the European man" and—after meticulous and detailed comparison with other European fossils he stated equally vaguely: "We must therefore denote the mandible of Homo heidelbergensis as pre-neandertaloid." The classification of the lower jaw of Mauer in the time before the Neanderthals proved to be accurate.

Schoetensack—like many of his colleagues around the beginning of the 20th century—was wrong with his assessment of kinship proximity of the lower jaw of Mauer with the apes (hominids): "The mandible of Homo heidelbergensis reveals the original state that defines mankind's and the ape's common ancestor." In 1924, the hitherto oldest fossil of the big pool of hominid variants—the Taung Child was discovered in what is now South Africa. It is around two million years older than the lower jaw of Mauer and, despite its advanced age, still does not represent the common base of humans and apes.

== Dating ==
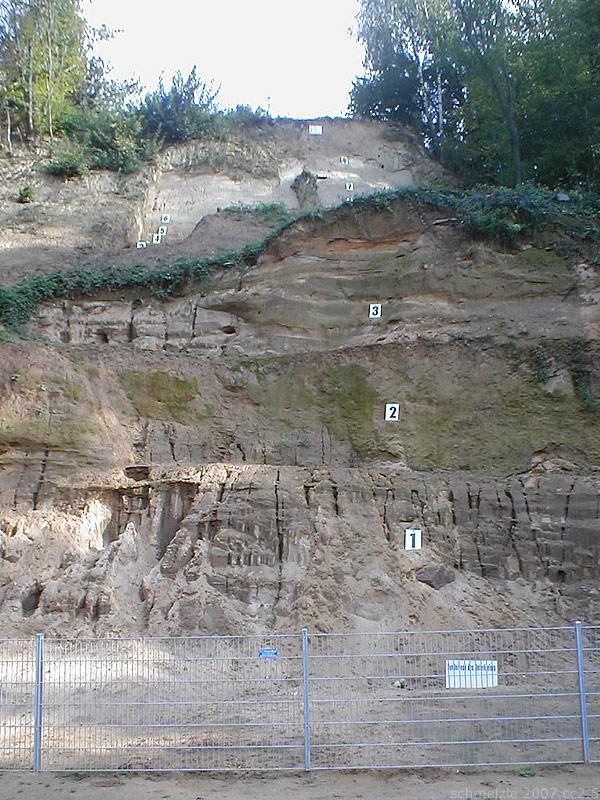
Sediment layers at the mine's edge in 2007

Otto Schoetensack had the site at the bottom of the sand mine marked with a commemorative stone on which a horizontal line represented the level of the find. Whether his wish had been granted—namely that the stone may remain in its place, even if the sand mine will one day be re-filled—is unknown. In fact, the part of the mine, in which the lower jaw came to light, was filled with overburden in the 1930s, later re-natured as arable land and declared a nature reserve in 1982. The actual site is therefore not accessible for research at the present time. Absolute dating of the strata using contemporary scientific methods proved to be not possible. Alternatively scientists have repeatedly tried to deduce the age of the fossil's layer, using stratigraphic methods.

Schoetensack had described the merely ten-centimeter-thick layer of the find as "layer of gravel (scree), slightly cemented due to carbonation of calcium, with very thin layers of clay (Letten), that faintly reacts with hydrochloric acid". Above and below of the finding's strata, sands and other materials had accumulated in various definable layers. These had been deposited on the edge of a former Neckar River arc over the course of millennia. In the preface to his study he states: "The age of these sands is commonly agreed to as paleo-diluvial (altdiluvial) by reference to embedded mammal remains; although certain species suggest a significant relationship with a more recent section of the Tertiary, namely the Pliocene. According to contemporary dating methods, these facts would imply a lower age limit of around 780,000 years and a maximum of several million years."

At the 100th anniversary of the discovery in 2007 a scientific commemorative publication complained that there "still existed no satisfactory exact data for the determination of the geological age of the lower jaw of Homo heidelbergensis". After all, in 1995 the age of the sands of Mauer 1 could approximately be determined on the basis of small fossils. Additionally, attempts were made to perform an absolute dating in yet accessible, adjacent sand mines. However, to date researchers could not agree on which of the several possible layers that belong to the Cromer-warm period is identical with the layer of the Grafenrain mine. So it happens that the commune of Mauer dates the fossil to an age "of more than 600,000 years" on its website, whereas the memorial stone called an age of 500,000 years. A range from 474,000 to 621,000 years is currently considered to be the established age of "layer 4", in which the actual fossil either originates from the lower (around 600,000) or the upper (around 500,000) spectrum.

In November 2010, the final dating of sand grains via infrared-radio fluorescence (IR-RF) and the dating of the teeth via a combined electron-spin and uranium–lead dating was published in the Proceedings of the National Academy of Sciences wherein the age of the fossil was concluded as to be of 609,000 ± 40,000 years.

== Relation to modern humans ==
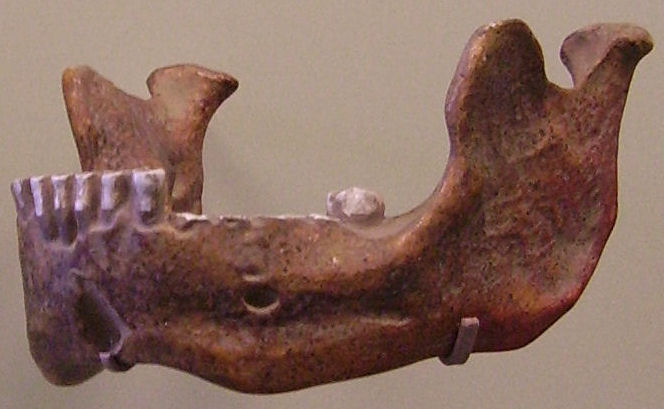
Lateral view (replica)

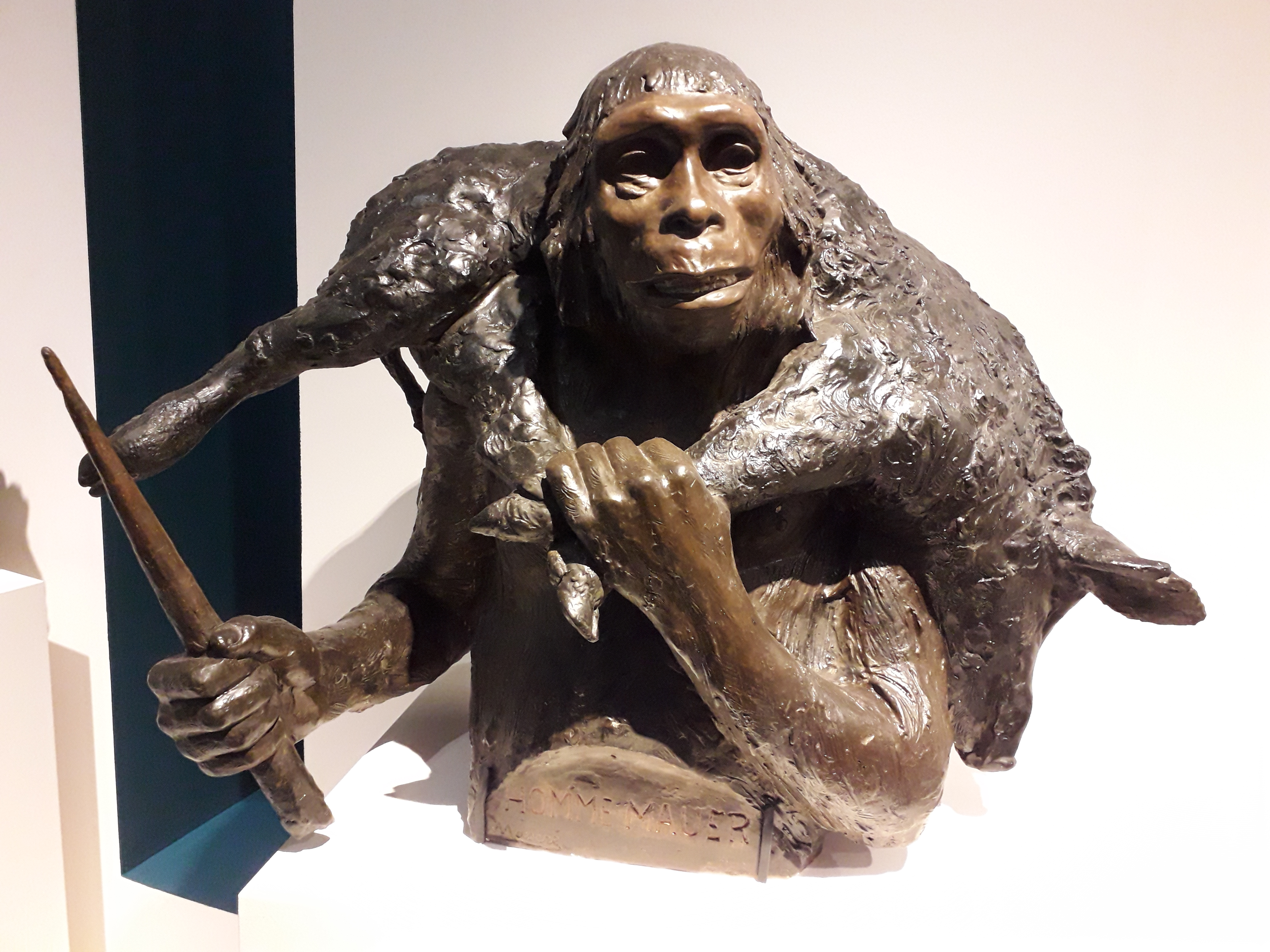
Bronze bust of the Mauer 1 individual by Louis Mascré and Aimé Rutot, 1909–1914 (Institut royal des Sciences naturelles de Belgique, Brussels)

The Mauer mandible is the type specimen of the species Homo heidelbergensis. "The anatomy is clearly more primitive than that of Neanderthal, but the harmoniously rounded dental arch and the complete row of teeth...already typically human." Based on these circumstances—the chronological delineation from the more recent Neanderthal on the one hand, and from older fossils, denoted as Homo erectus on the other—today's researchers consider it justifiable to declare Mauer 1 as an independent chronospecies. According to Chris Stringer, Homo heidelbergensis ranks separable between earlier Homo erectus and the more recent Neanderthal and Homo sapiens; it is from this point of view the last common ancestor of Neanderthal and anatomically modern man.

Other researchers hold the contrary view that the evolutionary development in Africa and Europe was a gradual process from Homo erectus via the representative of the findings assigned to Homo heidelbergensis towards Neanderthal. Any form of segregation is considered arbitrary, which is why these researchers forgo the name Homo heidelbergensis altogether. They classify the Mauer 1 man as a late local (European) form of Homo erectus.

However, there is agreement among all paleo-anthropologists that the lower jaw of Mauer does not belong to the immediate ancestral line of modern man. He is regarded rather as a descendant of an early migration to Europe and Asia (depending on the terminology—of Homo erectus or Homo heidelbergensis), whose oldest fossils outside of Africa are about 1.8 million years old. The last descendant of this first migration to Europe was Neanderthal, who became extinct about 30,000 years ago. Members of the species Homo sapiens arrived in Europe only in a second migratory wave of the genus Homo at around 40,000 to 30,000 years ago, whose descendants include modern man. This view might need to be revised after Svante Pääbo's discovery of Neanderthal DNA and its presence in modern humans.

== Habitat ==
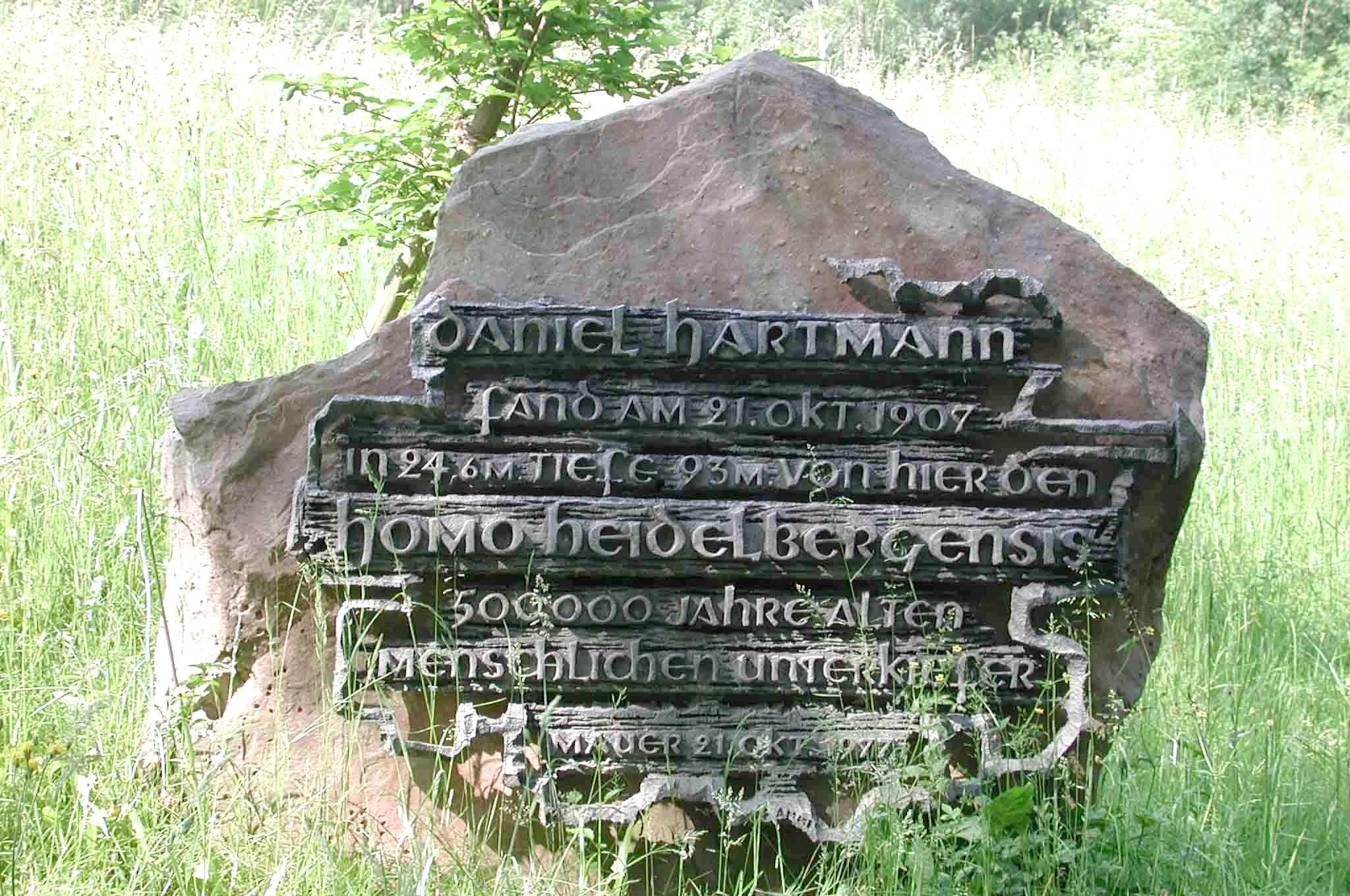
70th-anniversary memorial stone

As uncertain as the exact dating of the lower jaw of Mauer was until recently, so is the assignment of other fossils to its layer. Such contextual fossils are the only direct evidence for an accurate reconstruction of the habitat of a find. Not until 1991 two sets of core drilling were conducted in the defunct sand mine of Grafenrain and—beginning in 1995, several dozen cubic meters of sand were screened in search of fossil fragments that could shed light on accompanying species. However, mice teeth that were found proved to be not suitable for a more precise dating of the layer, since these mice lived anatomically virtually unchanged over too long a period. At least palynological findings of similar vegetation areas of the Cromer interglacial period can help with a description of the habitat.: "across alluvial forests in the river valleys, forests on the slopes and open forests on the heights; these were rather dry locations, regarding the hydro-geology of the crevasses (German: Kluftwassersystem) of the Buntsandstein—and Muschelkalk mountains, bare of any Loess sediments."

Animal fossils from different layers of the Grafenrain sand mine that were clearly identified and belonged to the same interglacial epoch as the find layer, inspired the author of a 2007 article in Die Zeit to a vivid diorama:

"...among spruce, birch and oak trees romped flying squirrels, roamed roe deer, elk and wild boar. Mole and shrew tunnelled through the grounds. And: Beavers damming the waters of the juvenile Neckar river. Hares flitted and horses galloped across open landscapes. Theoretically, nature provided steaks of elephant, the woolly rhinoceros and hippopotamus. Whether the "Heidelberger" ventured on such prey, must be doubted. Almost certainly he took to his heels in front of bear, wolf, leopard, saber-toothed cat and hyena."

== Images from the original species description ==
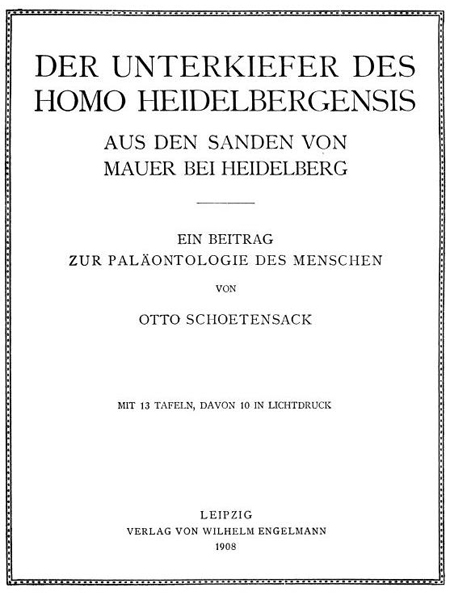
Title page of the first description of Homo heidelbergensis

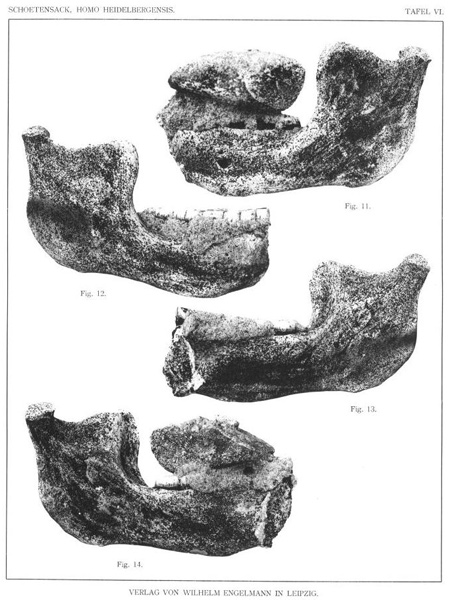
Original condition with adherent material

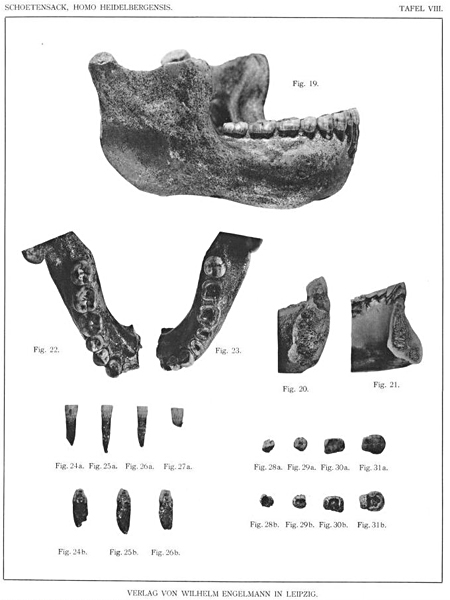
Condition after cleaning

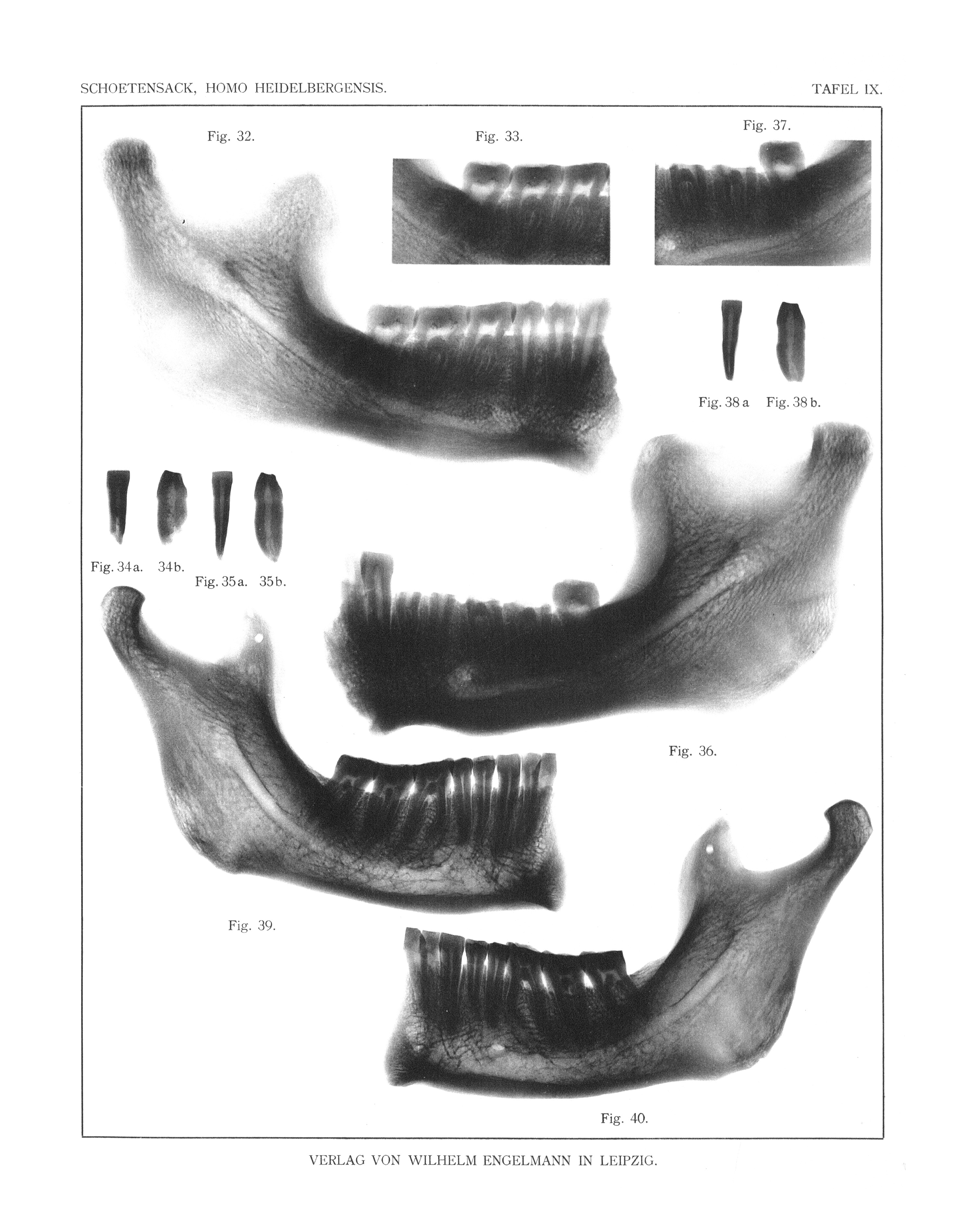
Radiography

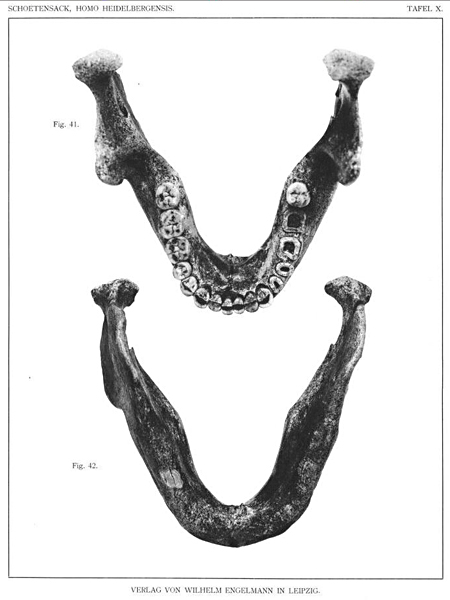
Inferior - and occlusal view

== Bibliography ==
- Otto Schoetensack: Der Unterkiefer des Homo Heidelbergensis aus den Sanden von Mauer bei Heidelberg. Ein Beitrag zur Paläontologie des Menschen. Verlag von Wilhelm Engelmann, Leipzig 1908 (Complete text(in German)).
- Alfried Wieczorek, Wilfried Rosendahl (Hrsg.): MenschenZeit. Geschichten vom Aufbruch der frühen Menschen. Philipp von Zabern, Mainz 2003, ISBN 3-8053-3132-0 (Katalog zur gleichnamigen Ausstellung der Reiss-Engelhorn-Museen in Mannheim).
- Günther A. Wagner, Hermann Rieder, Ludwig Zöller, Erich Mick (Hrsg.): Homo heidelbergensis. Schlüsselfund der Menschheitsgeschichte. Konrad Theiss Verlag, Stuttgart 2007, ISBN 978-3-8062-2113-8.
- Katerina Harvati: 100 years of Homo heidelbergensis – life and times of a controversial taxon. In: Mitteilungen der Gesellschaft für Urgeschichte 16, 2007, 85–94 PDF.

== See also ==
- Altamura Man
- List of fossil sites
- List of human evolution fossils
- Neanderthal 1
- Saldanha man
