= Narmada Human =

Extinct species of human

- Common name: Narmada Human
- Species: uncertain Archaic Human
- Age: Middle to Late Pleistocene, 160,000 to 50,000 years ago
- Place discovered: Hathnora village, Madhya Pradesh, India

The Narmada Human, originally the Narmada Man, is a species of extinct human that lived in central India during the Middle and Late Pleistocene. From a skull cup discovered from the bank of the Narmada River in Madhya Pradesh in 1982, the discoverer, Arun Sonakia classified it was an archaic human and gave the name Narmada Man, with the scientific name H. erectus narmadensis. Analysis of additional fossils from the same location in 1997 indicated that the individual could be a female, hence, a revised name, Narmada Human, was introduced. It remains the oldest human species in India.

The Narmada Valley became a fossil attraction in the early 19th century following the discovery of a dinosaur, Titanosaurus. Discovery of stone tools prompted a search for early human fossils, but over a century of research was in vain. The discovery of the Narmada Human is remarked as the moment that "brought the Narmada Valley back into palaeoanthropological focus." The fossil had been variously reclassified as archaic Homo sapiens, evolved Homo erectus, Homo heidelbergensis, and also dubiously (Note: The original publications in a predatory journal Advances in Anthropology from Scientific Research Publishing) as a distinct species, Homo narmadensis. Additional fossils described since 1997 have suggested more relatedness to archaic H. sapiens.

== Discovery ==
The Narmada Valley is one of the earliest and richest fossil sites in India. The first fossils were discovered by British Army Captain William Henry Sleeman in 1828. Sleeman found two backbones (caudal vertebrae) from the Lameta Formation at Jabalpur that were later identified as those of a dinosaur, Titanosaurus. Since then, many fossils of invertebrates and vertebrates have been discovered. The search for prehistoric human remains in the region was inspired by the discovery of a Stone Age hand axe by C.A. Hacket that was reported in 1873.

In October 1982, the Geological Survey of India (GSI) assigned Arun Sonakia to explore Hoshangabad district. On 5 December, Sonakia found a skull cup (calvaria) lying on the surface of an alluvial soil on the northern bank of Narmada River, near Hathnora village. The fossil was among several other fossils of horse, pig and Stegodon, and various stone tools. After careful analysis of the skull cup as part of a prehistoric human, the discovery was officially announced by the government on 21–22 July 1983, and through the newsletter of GSI. In 1984, N. G. K. Murthy, Director of GSI Southern Region, presented the technical report to the Birla Archaeological and Cultural Geological Research Institute in Hyderabad.

Sonakia displayed the fossil cast at the first "Ancestors exhibit" of the American Museum of Natural History in New York during 6 to 10 April 1984. The exhibit was recorded the next year in the American Museum of Natural History's proceedings Ancestors, the Hard Evidence.

=== Identification ===
The first scientific description by Sonakia appeared in the Records of the Geological Survey of India in 1984 which described the specimen as Homo erectus narmadensis. In 1985, Sonakia sought the help of french palaeontologist Henry de Lumley, with whom he made further descriptions in two articles simultaneously published in January issue of L'Anthropologie. The fossil was again identified as H. erectus.

Kenneth A. R. Kennedy of Cornell University conveyed the report in the Records of the Geological Survey of India to the American Anthropological Association, which published it in its September 1985 issue of American Anthropologist. In it, Sonakia gave a more careful description:

The hominid fossil specimen, presently designated as "Narmada Man," is represented by a complete right half of the skull cap, to which a part of the left parietal is attached... [Its] cranial capacity... would fall around 1,200 cc... [It] bears a number of similarities to skulls of Asian Homo erectus, hence an affinity of "Narmada Man" to Homo erectus is suggested.

Kennedy added a cautionary note that the fossil was an undetermined species of human ("hominid calvarium of Homo sp. indet.). In 1988, Sonakia invited Kennedy to further examine the fossil kept at Nagpur. Reanalysis by the GSI and Cornell teams were jointly published in the American Journal of Physical Anthropology in 1991, which concluded the identity as Homo sapiens.

=== Additional fossils ===
The Anthropological Survey of India (ASI) organised an archaeological exploration of the central Narmada valley between 1983 and 1992, resulting in the discoveries of many animal remains, stone tools and new human fossil. The collarbone (clavicle) among animal bones collected from Hathnora fossil site was not recognised that of humans until careful analysis was done. In 1997, Anek Ram Sankhyan, the ASI senior anthropologist reported the description of a right collarbone in the Journal of Human Evolution, and further explained it in Current Science.

In 1998, Sankhyan discovered another collarbone, a left one, along with one lower rib at Hathnora fossil site. He reported the findings in Current Science in 2005. Another ASI exploration between 2005 and 2010 led to the discovery of parts of a thigh bone (femur) and arm bone (humerus) at Netankheri village that was reported in Current Science in 2012.

== Description ==
=== Identity ===
Sonakia established from the first skull cup that the individual was an adult male, and originally gave the name Narmada Man to match those of other asian H. erectus, like Peking Man and Java Man, and was popularised as such. When he reassessed the fossil with Lumley, it was identified a female in her 30s. Kennedy also agreed that the individual was a female. The more gender-accurate name Narmada Human was later adopted. The individual could have lived any time between 50 ka and 160 ka, during the Middle and Late Pleistocene. Sonakia had originally estimated the fossil age at around 500 to 600 ka based on the associated fossil.

=== Features and taxonomy ===
There is no consensus on the exact species identification of Narmada Human. It had been variously described as archaic Homo sapiens, evolved Homo erectus, or Homo heidelbergensis because it exhibits features shared with these human species, along with its own unique features. Sonakia and Lumley firmly held the classification as an evolved H. erectus. Kennedy was the first to be critical of this assignment, and argued that it could be an archaic H. sapiens. Reporting his analysis (with Sonakia, John Chiment, and K.K. Verma) in 1991, he stated:

Results of the most recent study, which includes morphometric and comparative investigations, lead to the conclusion that "Narmada Man" is appropriately identified as Homo sapiens. While the calvaria shares some anatomical features with Asian Homo erectus specimens, it exhibits a broader suite of morphological and mensural characteristics suggesting affinities with early Homo sapiens fossils.

However, Sonakia was not entire convinced and adhered to the H. erectus classification. In 2007, Sheela Athreya of the Texas A&M University College Station revised the systematic identification and concluded that the Narmada Human could not be H. erectus, but instead could be loosely identified as H. heidelbergensis, as she noted:

Narmada [Human] shows affinities with anatomically modern Africans and Europeans as well as most Middle Pleistocene H. heidelbergensis specimens, and could be classified as such... If only the subjective criteria of brain size and "transitional" morphology are used, it could be classified as H. heidelbergensis... [or] it can simply be referred to as "Middle Pleistocene Homo" a term that is sufficiently descriptive without the historical baggage of nomenclature that comes from ascribing this specimen to Asian H. erectus.

Sankhyan used to support Kennedy's assignment of the Narmada Human as archaic H. sapiens. However, his analysis in his doctoral thesis led him to realise that Athreya's classification is the most likely conclusion, as he remarked: "both the metric and nonmetric comparisons show that the Narmada calvarium has a generalized mosaic of primitive, shared, and unique morphological features, but cladistically it is closer to H. heidelbergensis." David W. Cameron of the Australian National University, with Rajeev Patnaik and Ashok Sahni of the Punjab University, found that the Narmada Human fits well with the features of the Steinheim skull in Germany, which is either H. heidelbergensis or H. neanderthalensis.

As originally identified, the Narmada Human shares most features with other Asian H. erectus. The presence of a small mastoid process, narrow post-orbital constriction, large and thick cranial vault, and a distinct bone called torus angularis are the major and common features of Asian H. erectus.

However, the Narmada Human has features that are more related to H. sapiens. The most important is its brain size, which falls between 1,155 and 1,421 cc, with an approximate average of 1,200 cc. The average brain size of Asian H. erectus is about 1,000 cc, with mostly towards the lower range up to 800 cc; while early H. sapiens have the brain size ranging from 1,200 to 1,400 cc.

Some features of the Narmada Human are not shared with any other human species. A sagittal crest with a furrow on top of the skull, a large outer ear hole, and extended temporal bones are not known in other species.

== Evolutionary importance and interpretations ==
Sonakia held the view that the Narmada Human was a transitional group of H. erectus that links African and Asian populations. He wrote in 1998:

The discovery of Indian Homo erectus bridges the gap between African H. erectus in the west and Chinese [Peking Man] and Javan H. erectus [Java Man] in the east and south east respectively. There is a general consensus of opinion that Afro-Asian H. erectus ranges in age from Lower Pleistocene to Middle Pleistocene. Indian H. erectus falls within this range.

According to Cameron, Patnaik and Sahni, the Narmada Human is most closely related to extinct humans such as H. heidelbergensis or H. neanderthalensis than H. erectus. It represents a different species that met evolutionary dead-end in India, fitting into the out of Africa theory of modern human origin.
