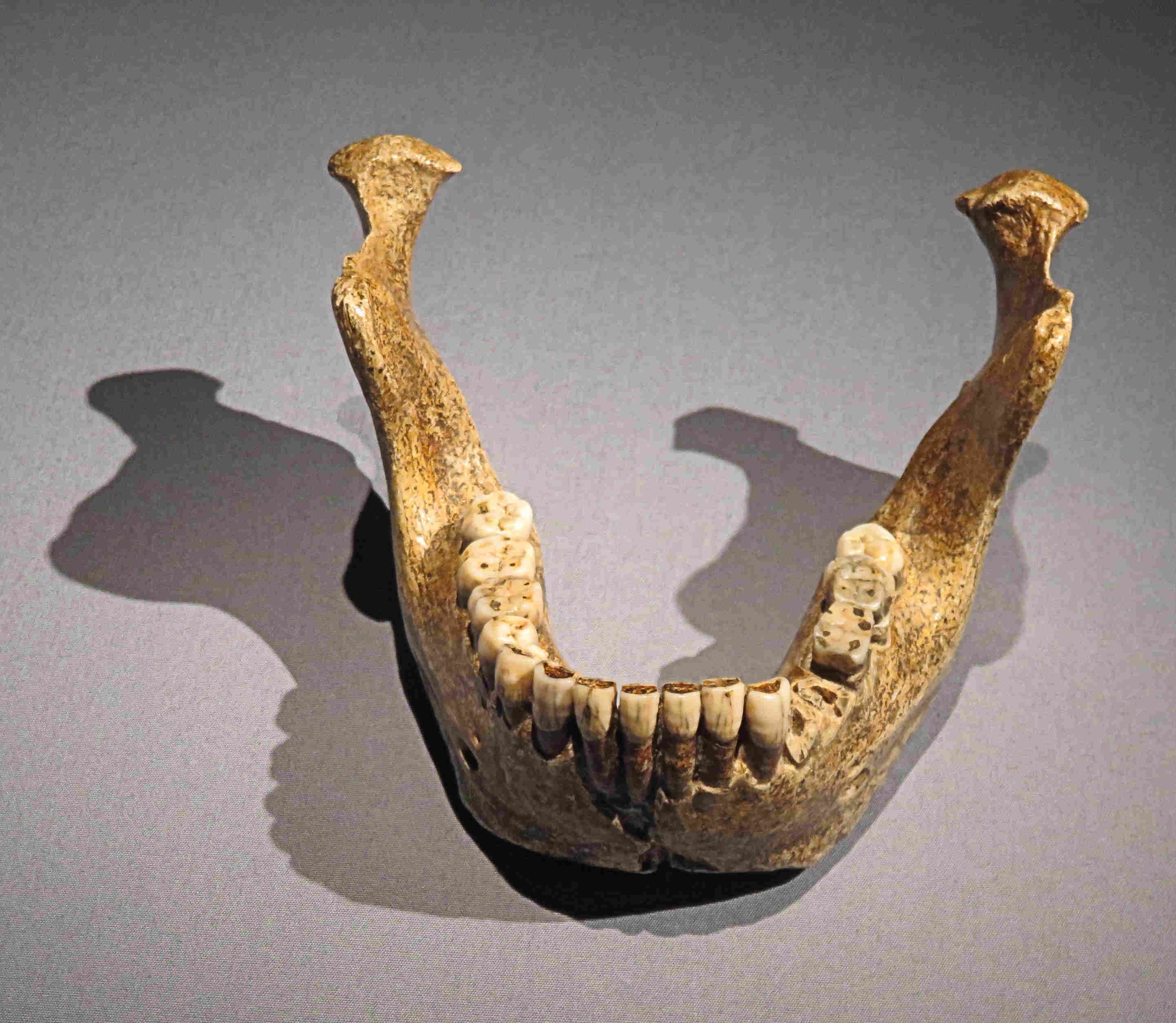
- The holotype specimen, Mauer 1

Scientific classification
- Kingdom: Animalia
- Phylum: Chordata
- Class: Mammalia
- Order: Primates
- Superfamily: Hominoidea
- Family: Hominidae
- Genus: Homo
- Species: †H. heidelbergensis

Binomial name
- †Homo heidelbergensis Schoetensack, 1908

= Homo heidelbergensis =

Homo heidelbergensis Temporal range: 0.7–0.3 Ma Middle Pleistocene

Extinct species of archaic human

Homo heidelbergensis (/ˌhoʊmoʊ ˌhaɪdəlbɜːrɡˈɛnsɪs/) is a controversial and somewhat poorly defined species of archaic human from the Middle Pleistocene of Europe and Africa, as well as potentially Asia depending on the taxonomic convention used. The species-level classification of Homo during the Middle Pleistocene is controversial, called the "muddle in the middle," owing to the wide anatomical range of variation that populations exhibited during this time. H. heidelbergensis has been regarded as either the last common ancestor of modern humans, Neanderthals, and Denisovans; or as a completely separate lineage.

H. heidelbergensis was described by German anthropologist Otto Schoetensack in 1908 based on a jawbone, Mauer 1, from a sand pit near the village of Mauer — 10 km (6.2 mi) southeast of Heidelberg. It was the oldest identified human fossil in Europe, and Schoetensack described it as an ancestor race of living Europeans. By the mid-20th century, all archaic human taxa were lumped as subspecies of either H. erectus or H. sapiens with the former evolving into the latter without any coexistence. The species was usually lumped as H. e. heidelbergensis. While its utility was complicated by its definition on a jawbone (which is rarely ever found, and otherwise bears few diagnostic features) British physical anthropologist Chris Stringer revived the species in 1983, redefining it as a Euro-African ancestor of modern humans and Neanderthals using namely Kabwe 1, Petralona 1, Bodo, and Arago. These skulls are united mainly by their supraorbital torus (brow ridge) anatomy.

H. heidelbergensis may have evolved from H. ergaster (African H. erectus) possibly following an intense population bottleneck 800,000 to 900,000 years ago. Populations dispersed into Europe by 700,000 years ago, spreading Late Acheulean stone tools. Settlements became more permanent by 500,000 years ago. H. heidelbergensis may have been an active hunter of big game including straight-tusked elephant and Stephanorhinus rhinoceroses, but at least some populations also subsisted significantly on food plants and small game. Fire does not seem to have been used frequently, but huts and temporary shelters may have been constructed at least around Europe. There are some instances of nondescript etchings on pebbles as well as modified and heated ochre which could have been done with symbolic intentions.

== Research history ==
=== Classification ===
==== Raciology ====
On 21 October 1907, miners recovered a large human mandible (lower jaw) about 24.1 m (79 ft) down the Grafenrain sand pit near the village of Mauer — 10 km (6.2 mi) southeast of Heidelberg. German geologists Ernst Wilhelm Benecke and Adolf Sauer had earlier characterised the site as diluvial deposits dating to the Tertiary. Mauer 1 was the oldest European human fossil at the time. German anthropologist Otto Schoetensack made the first report of the skull in 1908, classifying it as a new human species, Homo heidelbergensis. After Neanderthals (H. neanderthalensis), it was the second-named fossil species in the genus Homo.

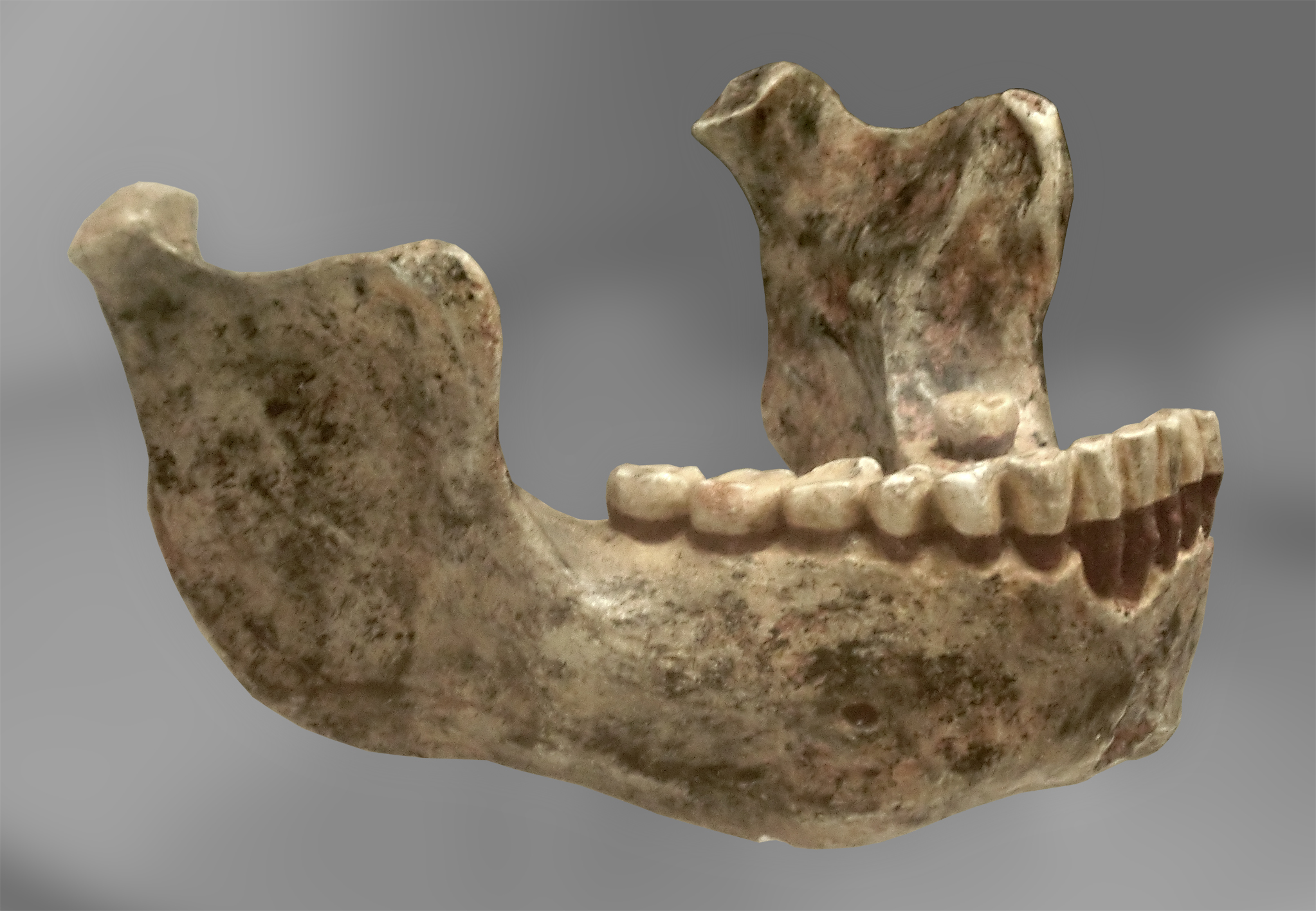
Cast of Mauer 1 at the Museum of Gothenburg

Schoetensack noted the jaw's exceptionally primitive anatomy with its massive size and lack of chin, yet more modern traits such as small teeth. Therefore, he concluded Mauer 1 must represent an ancient European ancestor, which he claimed was further supported by several ontogenetic developments in Europeans. He also claimed that the many similarities with non-human apes indicate that Mauer 1 lies near the last common ancestor of apes and humans.

Allerdings sind die Maße groβ [in Mauer 1], wenn man moderne europäische Objekte zum Vergleich heranzieht. Sowie man aber diesen auf jetzige niedere Rassen ausdehnt, verschwindet die Differenz.

The dimensions are large [in Mauer 1] when modern European objects are used for comparison. However, as soon as one extends this to present-day lower races, the difference disappears.

— Otto Schoetensack, 1908

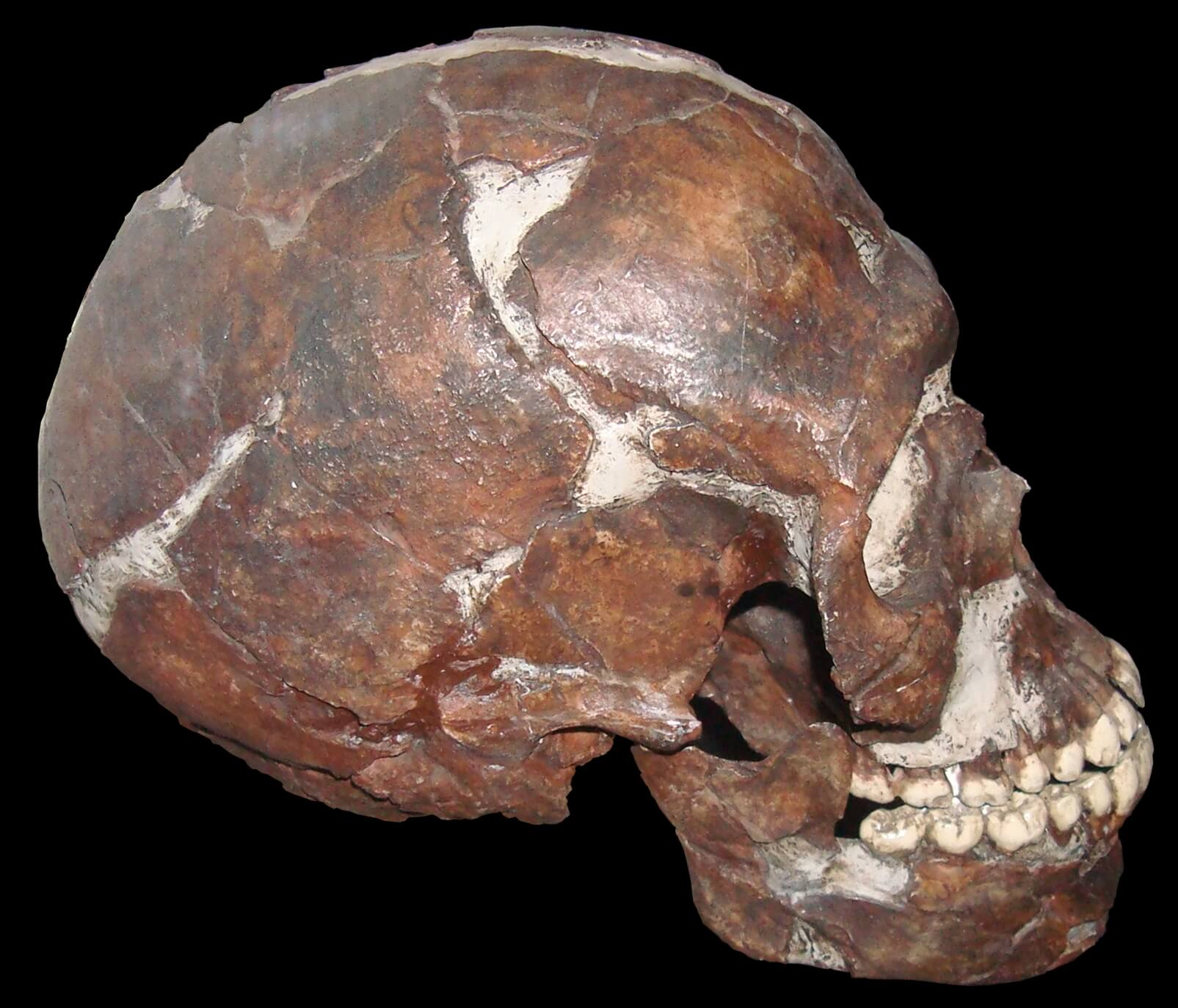
The Skhul and Qafzeh hominins (Qafzeh 9 pictured) were thought to directly descend from Mauer 1.

In 1909, Croatian archaeologist Dragutin Gorjanović-Kramberger recommended renaming Mauer 1 "H. amentalis" ("chinless") as, at that time, every other jaw classified in the genus Homo had at least a weak chin. In 1909, Italian palaeontologist Guido Bonarelli proposed erecting a new genus as "Palaeanthropus heidelbergensis" to recognise its age and primitiveness. German anthropologist Hans Weinert suggested "Europanthropus heidelbergensis", and German anthropologist Ludwig Wilser "Rhenanthropus heidelbergensis" for a similar reason. In 1927, Czech-American anthropologist Aleš Hrdlička considered it a European variant of the Java Man "Pithecanthropus erectus" (now Homo erectus erectus). In 1928, German anatomist Franz Weidenreich made a similar opinion. In 1937, American archaeologist Theodore D. McCown and British anatomist Sir Arthur Keith suggested extending "Palaeoanthropus" to any other fossil with many Neanderthal features, with "P. heidelbergensis" as the oldest member. They also included "P. neanderthalensis" (specifically La Chappelle-aux-Saints 1 and Neanderthal 1), "P. ehringsdorfiensis", "P. krapinensis", and "P. palestinensis".

==== Modern evolutionary synthesis ====
By the middle of the century with the formulation of modern evolutionary synthesis, the common convention was to relegate all ancient human specimens into the genus Homo, and designate only a single species of Homo at any point in time: H. erectus which evolved into H. sapiens (anagenesis). The many defined species of archaic humans, including heidelbergensis, were generally lumped as subspecies of either H. erectus or H. sapiens. This left H. erectus and H. sapiens considerably polytypic and anatomically variable. In 1963, Russian-American geneticist Theodosius Dobzhansky noted that Middle Pleistocene Western and Eastern Eurasia — the former represented by H. e. heidelbergensis and the Tunisian H. e. mauritanicus; and the latter by the Chinese H. e. pekinensis and H. e. erectus — had significant anatomical and technological differences (Movius Line). He forwarded the possibility that these two groups represent distinct but contemporary species (cladogenesis), with H. erectus in the East, and the ancestors of H. sapiens in the West.

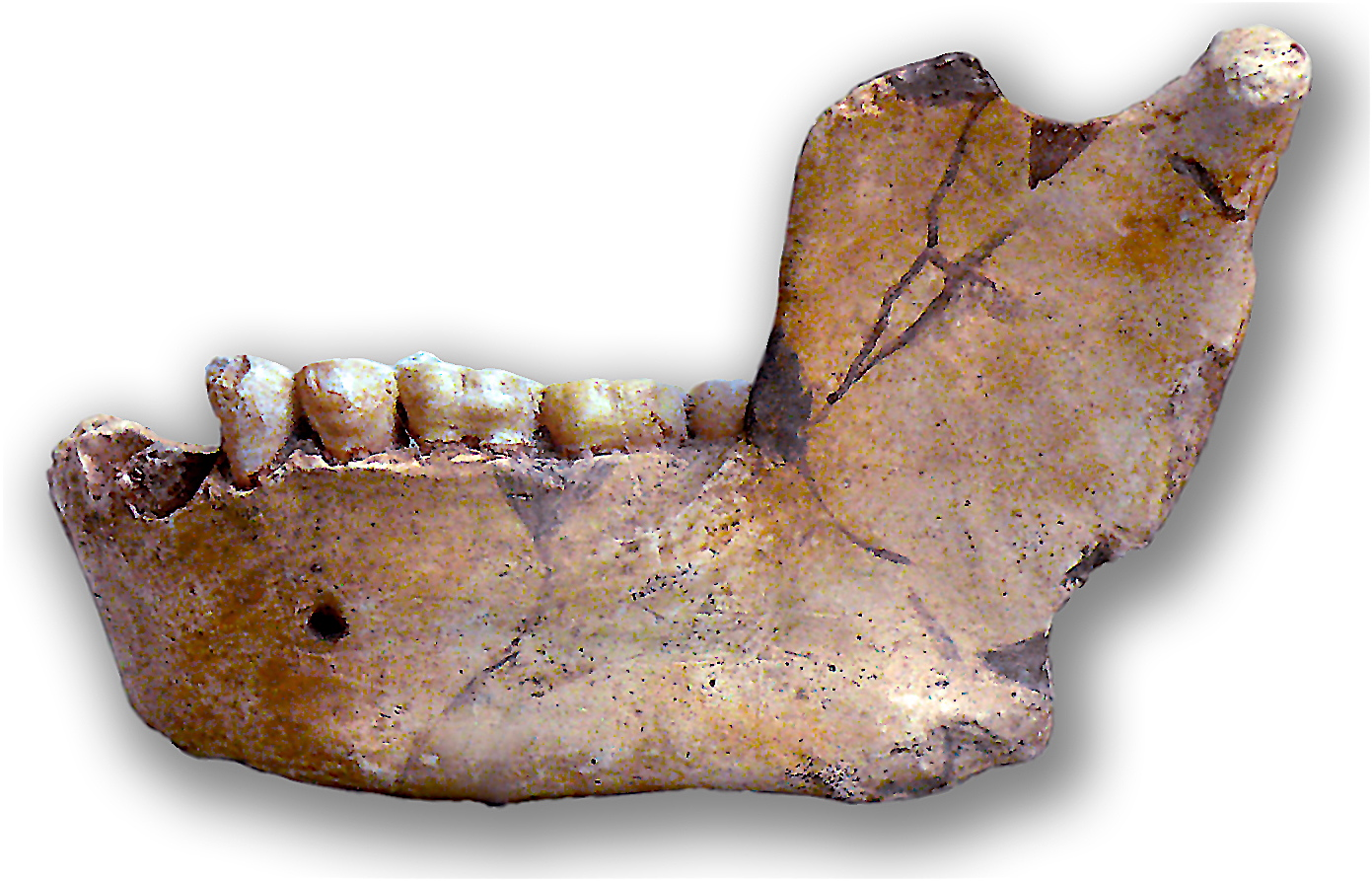
Theodosius Dobzhansky grouped the Tighennif jaw ("H. e. mauritanicus", pictured) with Mauer 1 ("H. e. heidelbergensis").

In 1972, American palaeoanthropologist Bernard Campbell divided Middle Pleistocene H. erectus into two chrono-subspecies (that is, designating a given subspecies as more closely related to certain subspecies over others); one group including H. e. heidelbergensis, H. e. mauritanicus, and H. e. pekinensis; and the other the Tanzanian H. e. leakeyi (Olduvai Gorge Bed IV) and H. e. erectus. At this point, H. e. heidelbergensis included at least Mauer 1 and the Hungarian Vértesszőlős 2.

==== Cladistics ====
In 1974, British physical anthropologist Chris Stringer noted that the Greek Petralona 1 was anatomically more comparable to the Zambian Kabwe 1, Mauer 1, and Vértesszőlős 2 than to East Asian Middle Pleistocene H. erectus. He proposed classifying them as H. s. heidelbergensis — a widespread Euro-African clade, and the last common ancestor of modern humans (H. sapiens sapiens) and Neanderthals (H. sapiens neanderthalensis). At the time, he was hesitant to revive entire species for fear of recluttering human taxonomy, but in 1983, he proposed classifying them as a unique species as either H. heidelbergensis or H. rhodesiensis (named in 1921 with Kabwe 1), depending on the inclusion of Mauer 1, as the common ancestor of H. sapiens and H. neanderthalensis. The utility of H. heidelbergensis is complicated by its definition on a jaw, which is an uncommon find in Middle Pleistocene deposits, and additionally has few diagnostic traits. Nonetheless, Kabwe 1, Petralona 1, the Ethiopian Bodo cranium, and the French Arago have normally been discussed altogether as representatives of H. heidelbergensis, united most evidently by their brow ridge anatomy.

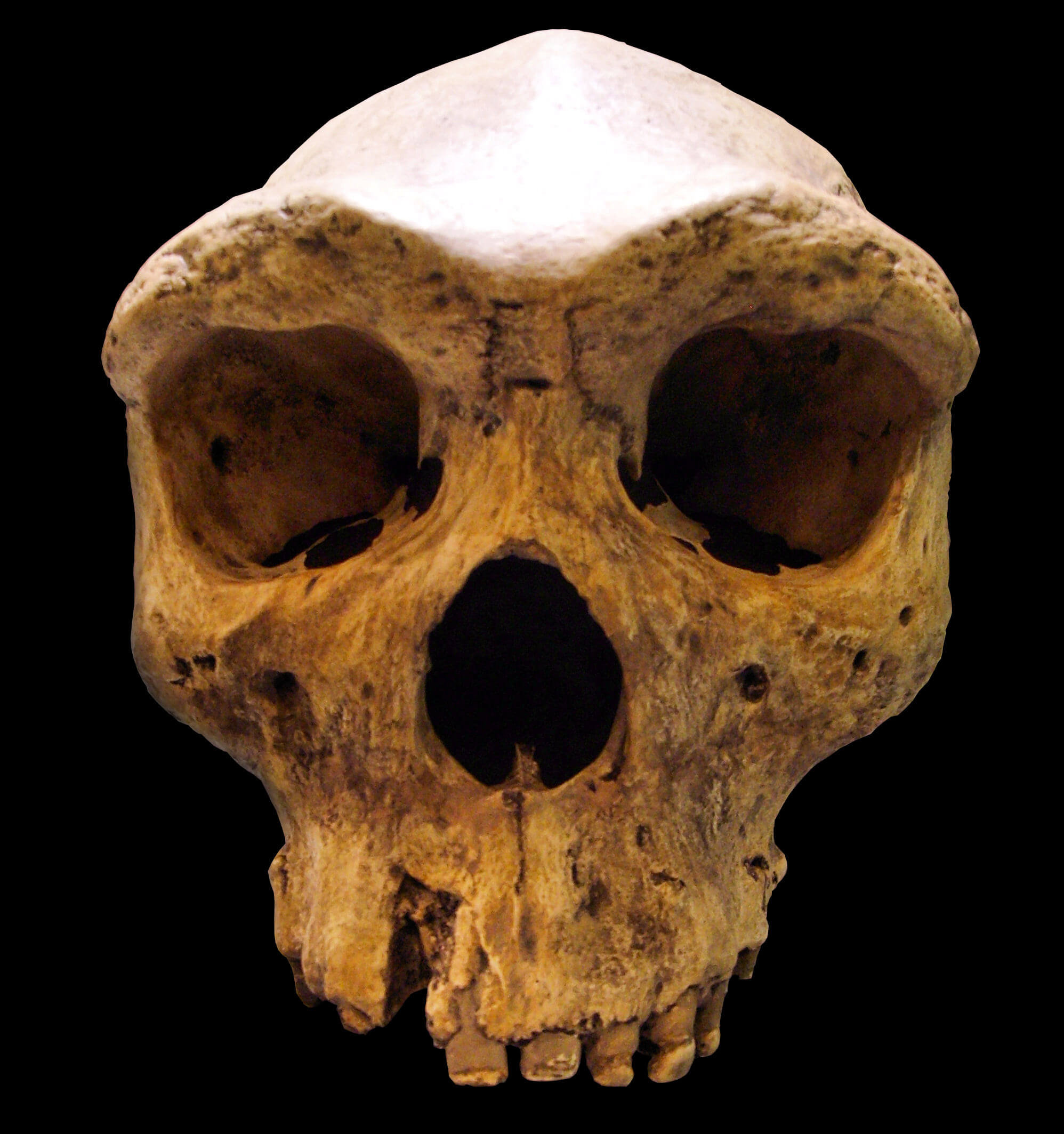
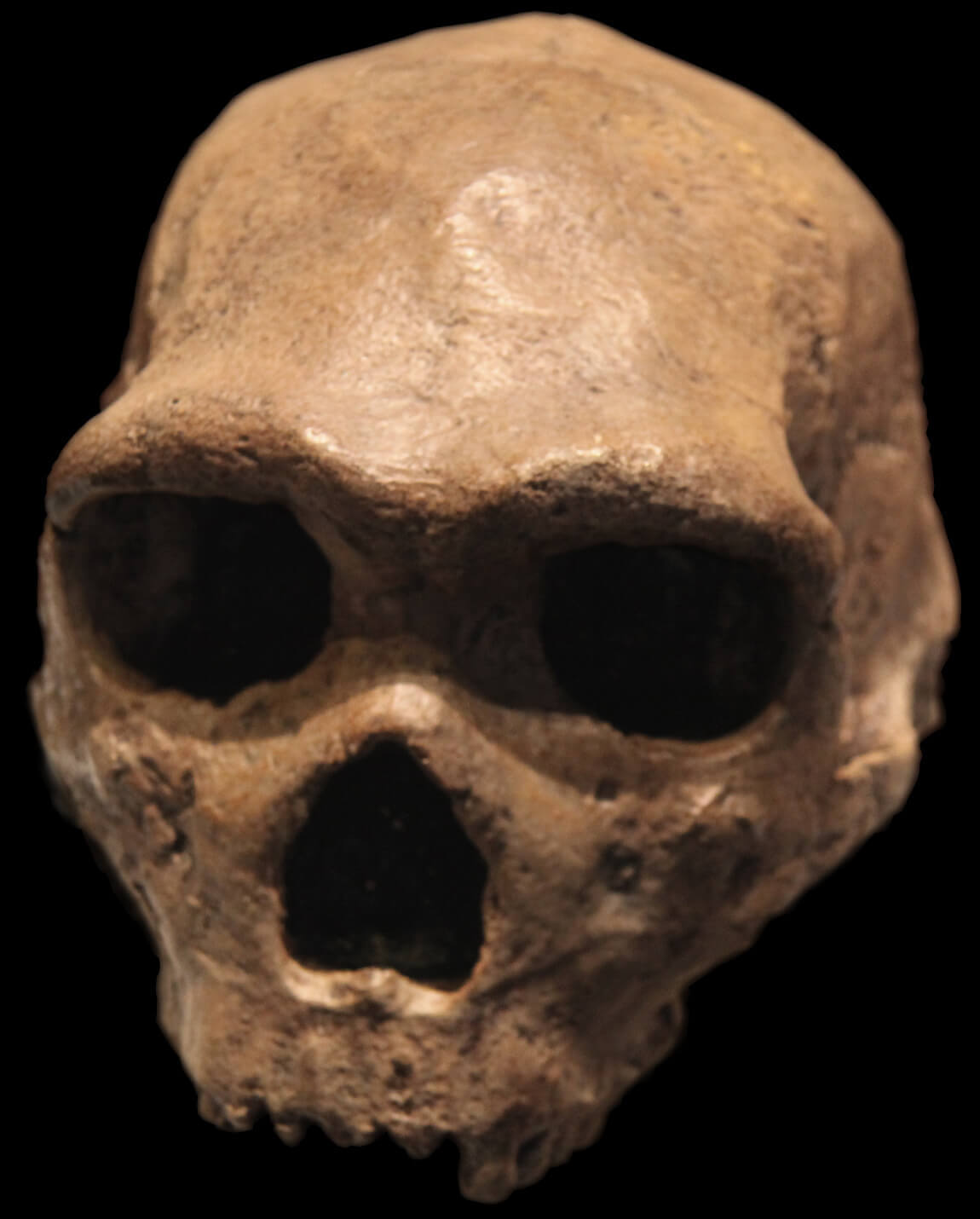
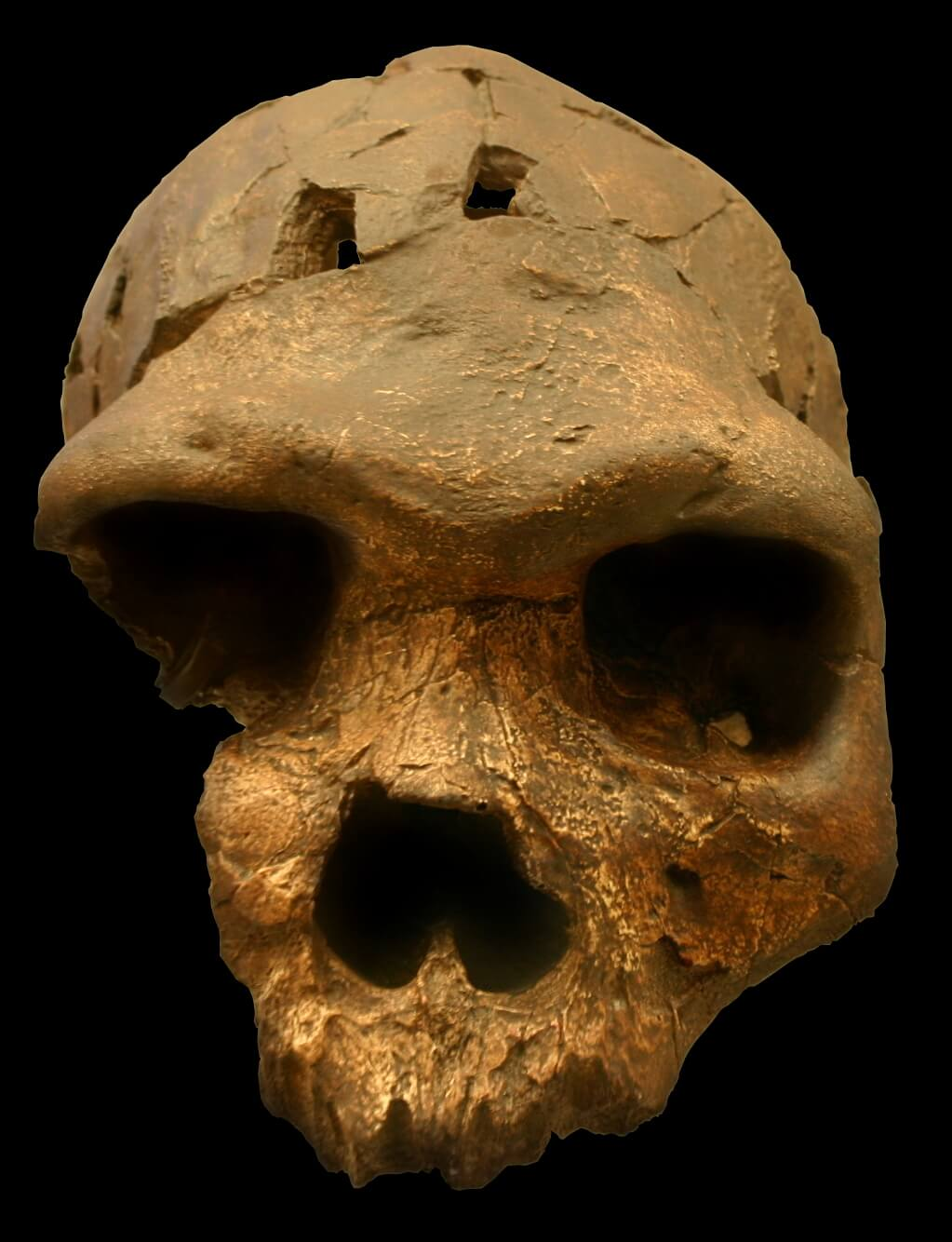
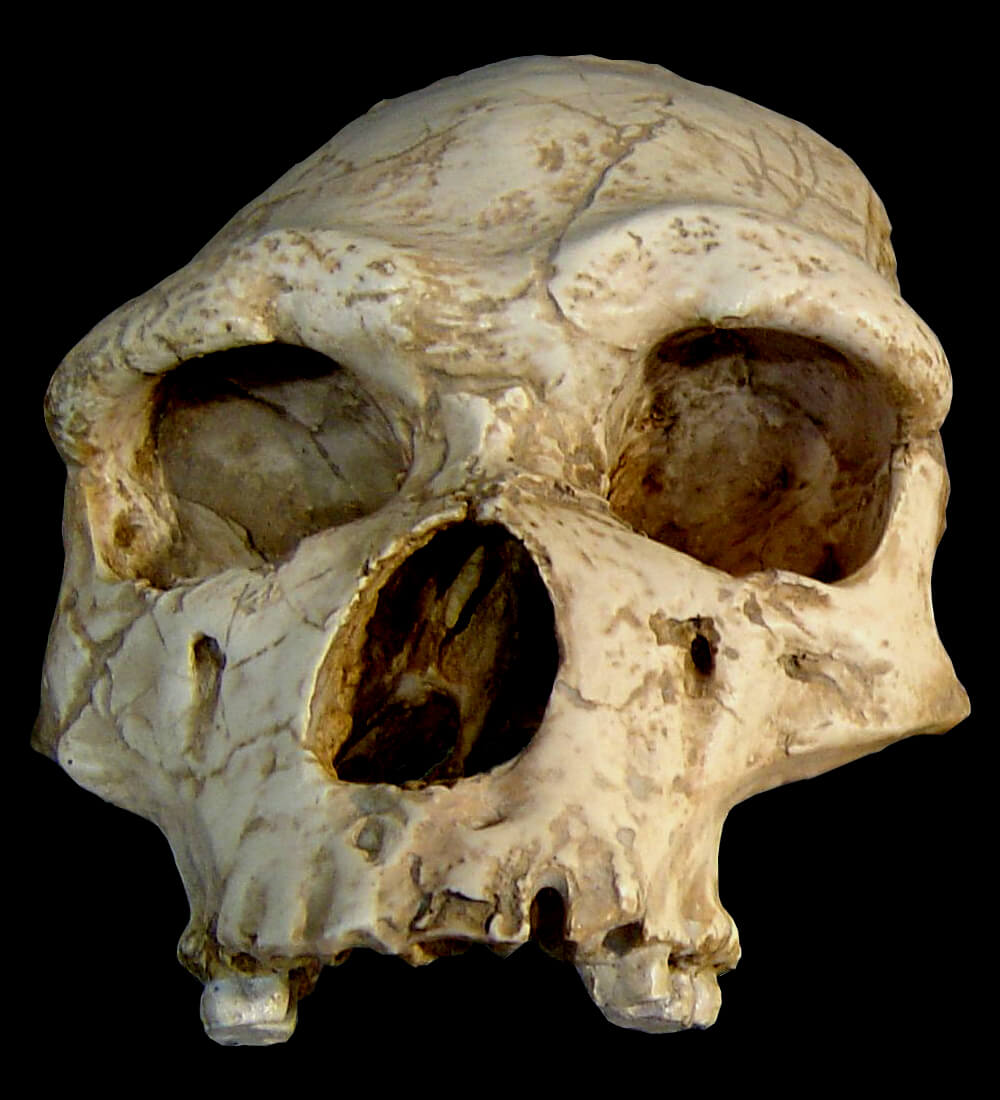
(Left to right) Kabwe 1, Petralona 1, Bodo, and Arago are commonly grouped altogether as H. heidelbergensis.

Though H. heidelbergensis became a popular designation, in 2000, American anthropologists Sally McBrearty and Alison S. Brooks argued that H. heidelbergensis should be reserved for only the direct ancestors of Neanderthals in Europe. They recommended reviving H. rhodesiensis to house African Middle Pleistocene fossils they believed were directly ancestral to modern humans. Spanish palaeoanthropologist Juan Luis Arsuaga and colleagues made a similar opinion while studying the Spanish Sima de los Huesos hominins — which comprise the vast majority of the Middle Pleistocene human fossil record. They opted to classify every Middle Pleistocene European fossil as a Neanderthal ancestor under the name H. heidelbergensis, and placed the 1 million year old Spanish H. antecessor as the last common ancestor of modern humans and Neanderthals. Stringer disagreed with the inclusion of the Sima de los Huesos hominins in H. heidelbergensis, preferring to classify them as Neanderthals.

In 2010, American palaeoanthropologists Jeffrey H. Schwartz and Ian Tattersall noted that, while the Euro-African H. heidelbergensis has a wide range of anatomical variation, these specimens may be too derived (have too many apomorphies, or unique traits) to represent modern human ancestors — though they could still be closely allied with Neanderthals. In 2011, French anthropologist Aurélien Mounier and colleagues instead extended H. heidelbergensis to encompass Middle Pleistocene specimens all across the Old World, including the Chinese Dali Man and Jinniushan — characterising H. heidelbergensis as an extremely polytypic species and the last common ancestor of modern humans and Neanderthals. They used the 400,000 year old Italian Ceprano Man skull (Note: Ceprano Man had been classified as a new species in 2003 as "Homo cepranensis" when it was dated to about 700,000 years ago. It was classified as potentially a close relative or ancestor of African H. rhodesiensis, which did not contribute to later European H. heidelbergensis populations.) as the "counterpart" of the Mauer 1 mandible to better diagnose the species.

In 2011, Arsuaga and colleagues failed to identify distinctly Neanderthal traits in Mauer 1 — unlike in the Sima de los Huesos hominins and some other Middle Pleistocene Europeans. They recognised two distinct groups occupying Middle Pleistocene Europe: one that was evolving into Neanderthals (pre-Neanderthals), and one that was not (maybe best designated as H. heidelbergensis). In Africa, Stringer noted that some of the specimens he assigned to H. heidelbergensis have similarities with modern humans in the face (such as the Tanzanian Ndutu cranium) while others do not (Kabwe 1 or Bodo).

==== Multiregionalism ====
One model of H. heidelbergensis as the last common ancestor of modern humans, Neanderthals, and Denisovans, with a late interbreeding event

In 2016, Stringer characterised H. heidelbergensis as either the group encompassing the last common ancestor of modern humans and Neanderthals, or a unique branch (more closely related to Neanderthals) which eventually became extinct. Either way, H. heidelbergensis would have lived at the same time as more derived morphs. These interconnected derived populations (not H. heidelbergensis) — dispersed across respectively Africa and Europe — seem to have been slowly accruing apomorphies at different rates, which would eventually culminate in respectively anatomically modern humans and classic Neanderthals (multiregionalism). Congruently, in 2020, the Kabwe 1 skull was dated to roughly 300,000 years ago, living at the same time as the earliest recognised modern human fossils at the Moroccan Jebel Irhoud site. Late-surviving H. heidelbergensis populations may have interbred with modern humans.

While some East Asian Middle Pleistocene fossils have some anatomical similarities to material typically classified as H. heidelbergensis, genetic sequencing of human fossils in the 2010s identified an enigmatic group of archaic humans called the Denisovans — closely related to Neanderthals — dispersed across East Asia. This opened the possibility that these East Asian specimens belong to a different, unique species (one that was also interbreeding with modern humans, as well as Neanderthals), such as H. longi.

The species-level classification of Middle Pleistocene humans is still a contentious matter, popularly termed "the muddle in the middle". H. rhodesiensis is usually considered to be a junior synonym of H. heidelbergensis. In 2022, Serbian–Canadian palaeoanthropologist Mirjana Roksandic instead suggested expanding the definition of H. neanderthalensis to include Middle Pleistocene European specimens with Neanderthal traits, and housing African and non-Neanderthal European specimens in H. bodoensis instead of H. rhodesiensis to avoid honouring Cecil Rhodes. She considered H. heidelbergensis too poorly defined to continue using. Her recommendations have been criticised for oversimplifying the archaeological record, and for violating the principle of priority.

In a 2024 interview with Cell Biology Magazine, Stringer expressed doubts with his earlier conceptions of H. heidelbergensis.

With Homo heidelbergensis, I had the view for a long time that it was the common ancestor of us and Neanderthals about 500,000 years ago. Now I think that's unlikely and that the common ancestor lived further back and did not look like heidelbergensis. That's partly a product of my being around for so long, as well as seeing so much new data and so many changes in thinking.

— Chris Stringer, 2024

=== Evolution ===
H. heidelbergensis is thought to have descended from African H. erectus — sometimes classified as H. ergaster. The exact derivation from an ancestor species is obfuscated by a long gap in the human fossil record near the end of the Early Pleistocene. In 2016, Italian anthropologist Antonio Profico and colleagues suggested that 875,000 year old skull material from the Gombore II site of the Melka Kunture Formation, Ethiopia, represents a transitional morph between H. ergaster and H. heidelbergensis, and thus postulated that H. heidelbergensis originated in Africa. A 2023 genetic study of 3,000 people found that the global population was reduced to less than 1,300 individuals between 800,000 and 900,000 years ago. This extreme population bottleneck could have caused the divergence of H. heidelbergensis.

Human dispersal beyond 45°N seems to have been quite limited during the Lower Palaeolithic, with evidence of short-lived dispersals northward beginning after a million years ago. More permanent populations seem to have become established above this parallel about 700,000 years ago. This coincides with the spread of hand axe technology across Europe, possibly associated with the dispersal of H. heidelbergensis and behavioural shifts to cope with the cold climate. Such occupation becomes much more frequent after 500,000 years ago.

According to genetic analysis, the last common ancestor of modern humans and Neanderthal split into a modern human line, and a Neanderthal/Denisovan line, and the latter later split into Neanderthal and Denisovans. According to nuclear DNA analysis, the 430,000 year old Sima de los Huesos hominins are more closely related to Neanderthals than Denisovans — meaning that the Neanderthal/Denisovan, and thus the modern human/Neanderthal split, had already occurred. This suggests that the modern human/Neanderthal last common ancestor had existed long before many specimens typically assigned to H. heidelbergensis did. H. heidelbergensis also seems to have lived alongside modern humans, demonstrated by the 300,000 year old Kabwe 1, which could further cast doubt on its position as a modern human ancestor.

A 2021 phylogeny of some Middle Pleistocene fossils using tip dating:

- Homo
  - H. habilis
  - - H. erectus (paraphyletic)
    - Homo heidelbergensis
      - Ternifine
      - - - Elandsfontein
          - - - Petralona
              - Kabwe 1
            - - Ceprano
              - Bodo
        - - - Mauer 1
            - Arago
          - - - Narmada
              - - Maba
                - Xuchang
            - - Ndutu
              - - Steinheim
                - - H. neanderthalensis
                  - - - Homo antecessor
                      - Homo longi
                    - H. sapiens

A subsequent version of this analysis found a different topology, with Homo heidelbergensis as a monophyletic group:

- - Asian Homo erectus
  - - - Narmada
      - - Xuchang
        - - Homo neanderthalensis
          - - Homo longi
            - Homo sapiens
    - Homo heidelbergensis
      - Bodo
      - - Ternifine
        - - Arago
          - - Mauer 1
            - - Kabwe 1
              - Petralona
            - - Ceprano
              - Elandsfontein

== Anatomy ==
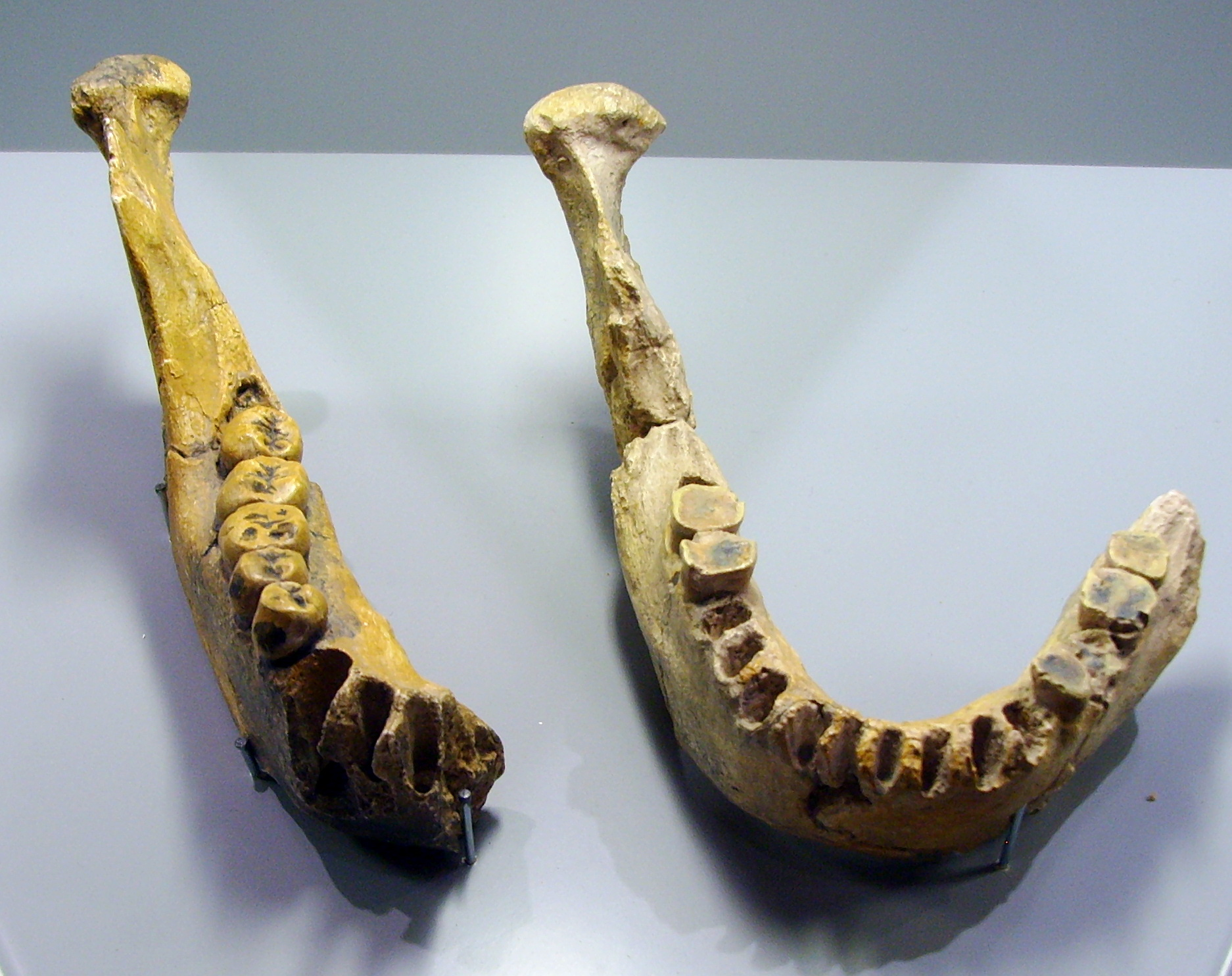
The two Arago jawbones

When Schoetensack described H. heidelbergensis in 1908 with the jaw Mauer 1, he distinguished it from any other human jaw known at the time by its thickened mandibular body, anteroposteriorly (front to back) widened ramus (where the jaw goes up to connect with the skull), and the lack of a chin. Kabwe 1, Petralona 1, Bodo, and Arago are normally presented altogether as representatives of H. heidelbergensis. The former three lack any jawbone material, but the Arago jawbones share with Mauer 1:

- A wide mandibular symphysis (where the left and right halves of the jaw fuse) which arcs up between two tubercles (bony projections where tendons and ligaments attach to) and expands back into a thickened body of the mandible (which creates a horizontal sulcus, or groove, above);
- A large and posterior mental foramen (hole for blood vessels); a low mandibular head (where the jaw hinge is) below the level of the coronoid process (which connects with the skull);
- A rounded gonial region (where the mandibular body meets the ramus).

All four skulls are united by their tall supraorbital tori (brow ridges) which have a generally flat front surface, twist at the superolateral margins (at the top by the edge of the face), and reach maximum height over the middle of the orbit (eye socket). They differ to some degree in the rest of the face.

From the few postcranial (body) fossils known from the Middle Pleistocene, people may have generally averaged 165–170 cm (5 ft 5 in – 5 ft 7 in) in height. The height of a female partial skeleton from Jinniushan is estimated to have been 165 cm (5 ft 5 in) in life. The Kabwe tibia is typically estimated to have belonged to someone 181.2 cm (5 ft 11 in) tall, among the tallest Middle Pleistocene height estimates, but it is possible that this individual was either unusually large or had a much longer tibia to femur ratio than expected. Early modern humans were notably taller, with the Skhul and Qafzeh remains averaging 185.1 cm (6 ft 1 in) for males and 169.8 cm (5 ft 7 in) for females, possibly to increase the energy-efficiency of long-distance travel with longer legs.

== Culture ==
=== Diet ===
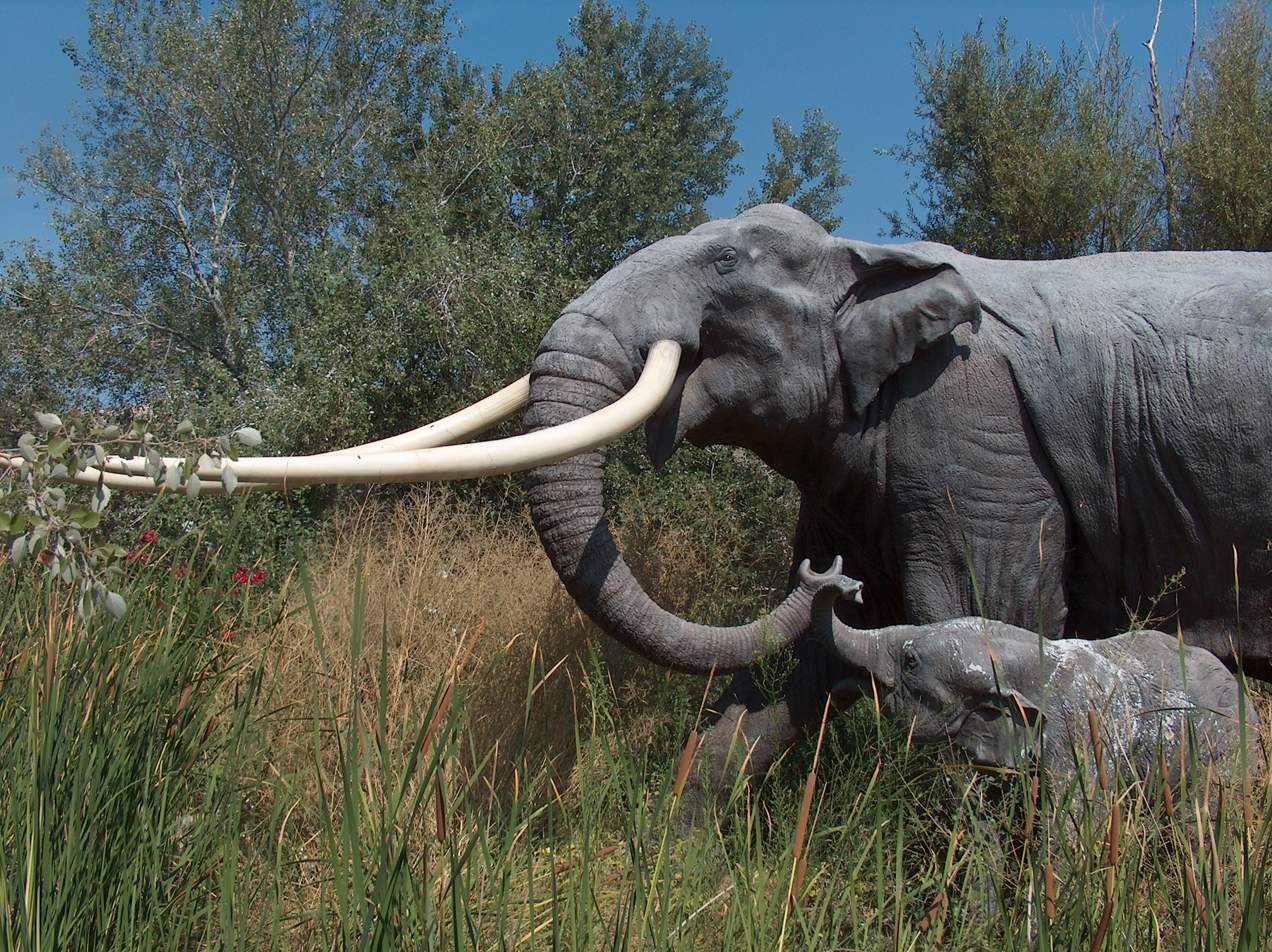
The straight-tusked elephant may have been commonly preyed upon by H. heidelbergensis.

Middle Pleistocene communities in general seem to have eaten big game at a higher frequency than predecessors with meat becoming an essential dietary component. In Europe, H. heidelbergensis was often butchering some of the largest megafaunal species in the region such as the straight-tusked elephant, the aurochs, and rhinoceroses of the genus Stephanorhinus. Though carcasses may have simply been scavenged, some Afro-European sites show specific targeting of a single species which more likely indicates active hunting. For example, Olorgesailie, Kenya, which has yielded over 50 to 60 butchered baboons (Theropithecus oswaldi); and the Spanish Torralba and Ambrona sites which feature elephants' graveyards. Subsistence on large prey items could indicate group hunting strategies. For instance, at Torralba and Ambrona, the animals may have been encircled and run into swamplands by a coordinated and organised group of hunters before being killed.

Some populations seem to have been extensively exploiting plant resources. At the 780,000 year old Gesher Benot Ya'aqov site, Israel, the inhabitants gathered and ate 55 different types of fruits, vegetables, seeds, nuts, and tubers. The inhabitants may have been using fire to roast certain plant materials that otherwise would have been inedible. They also consumed amphibians, reptiles, birds, aquatic and terrestrial invertebrates in addition to the usual large creatures such as elephant and fallow deer.

=== Technology ===
==== Stone tools ====
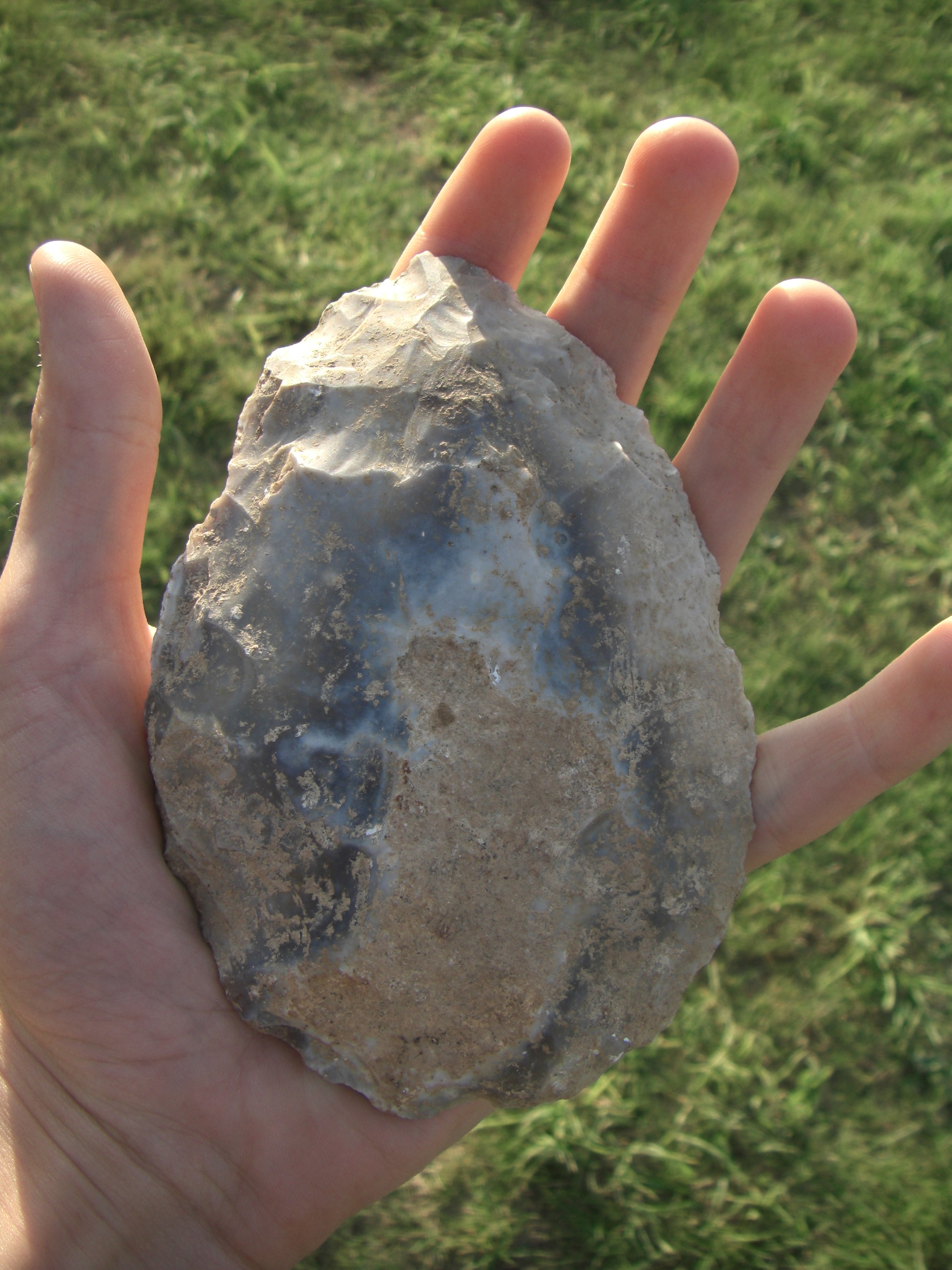
Handaxe from the Boxgrove site, England

The Lower Palaeolithic (Early Stone Age) comprises the Oldowan (a simple chopper and flake industry) which was replaced by the Acheulean, which is characterised by the production of mostly symmetrical hand axes. The Late Acheulean culture spread out across Europe and Africa by the beginning of the Middle Pleistocene, usually associated with the dispersal of H. heidelbergensis. This is distinguished from earlier Acheulean artefacts produced by H. erectus by the thinner and more symmetrical handaxes which bear more flaking scars. Some sites have much smaller handaxes which might fall under the African Middle Stone Age. The Late Acheulean reached Western Europe by the mid-Middle Pleistocene, but some sites — namely Arago — can feature predominantly choppers and flakes instead of handaxes.

At the 500,000 year old English Boxgrove site, knappers may have been making prepared platforms for tool making. They were also using bone and antler as hammers. Late Acheulean sites elsewhere preprepared lithic cores ("Large Flake Blanks", LFB) in a variety of ways before shaping them into tools, making prepared platforms unnecessary. LFB Acheulean spreads out of Africa into West and South Asia before a million years ago and is present in Southern Europe after 600,000 years ago, but northern Europe (and the Levant after 700,000 years ago) made use of soft hammers as they mainly made use of small, thick flint nodules. The first prepared platforms in Africa come from the 450,000 year old Fauresmith industry, possibly transitional between the Early Stone Age (Acheulean) and the Middle Stone Age.

Some of the points may have been hafted onto spears. In Africa, the earliest evidence of this comes from the 500,000 year old Kathu Pan 1 site in South Africa. A horse scapula from the 500,000 year old Boxgrove site shows a puncture wound consistent with a spear wound. Evidence of hafting (in both Europe and Africa) becomes much more common after 300,000 years ago.

The Kapthurin Formation, Kenya, has yielded the oldest evidence of small blade and bladelet technology, dating to 509,000 to 545,000 years ago. This technology is rare even in the Middle Palaeolithic, and is typically associated with Upper Palaeolithic modern humans. It is unclear if this is part of a long blade-making tradition, or if blade technology was lost and reinvented several times by multiple different human species.

==== Fire and construction ====
Despite apparent pushes of early humans into colder climates, evidence of fire is scarce in the archaeological record until 300,000 to 400,000 years ago. Though it is possible fire remnants simply degraded, long and overall undisturbed occupation sequences such as at Arago or Gran Dolina conspicuously lack convincing evidence of fire usage. This pattern could possibly indicate the invention of ignition technology or improved fire maintenance techniques at this time, and that fire was not an integral part of people's lives before then in Europe. In Africa, on the other hand, humans may have been able to frequently scavenge fire as early as 1.6 million years ago from natural wildfires, which occur much more often in Africa, thus possibly (more or less) regularly using fire. The oldest established continuous fire site beyond Africa is at Gesher Benot Ya'aqov.

In Europe, evidence of constructed dwelling structures—classified as firm surface huts with solid foundations built in areas mostly sheltered from the weather—has been recorded since the Cromerian Interglacial, the earliest example a 700,000-year-old stone foundation from Přezletice, Czech Republic. This dwelling probably featured a vaulted roof made of thick branches or thin poles, supported by a foundation of big rocks and earth. Other such dwellings have been postulated to have existed during or following the Holstein Interglacial (which began 424,000 years ago) in Bilzingsleben, Germany; Terra Amata, France; and Fermanville and Saint-Germain-des-Vaux in Normandy. These were probably occupied during the winter, and, averaging only 3.5 m × 3 m (11.5 ft × 9.8 ft) in area, they were probably only used for sleeping in, while other activities (including firekeeping) seem to have been done outside. Less-permanent tent technology may have been present in Europe in the Lower Palaeolithic.

=== Art ===
==== Engravings ====
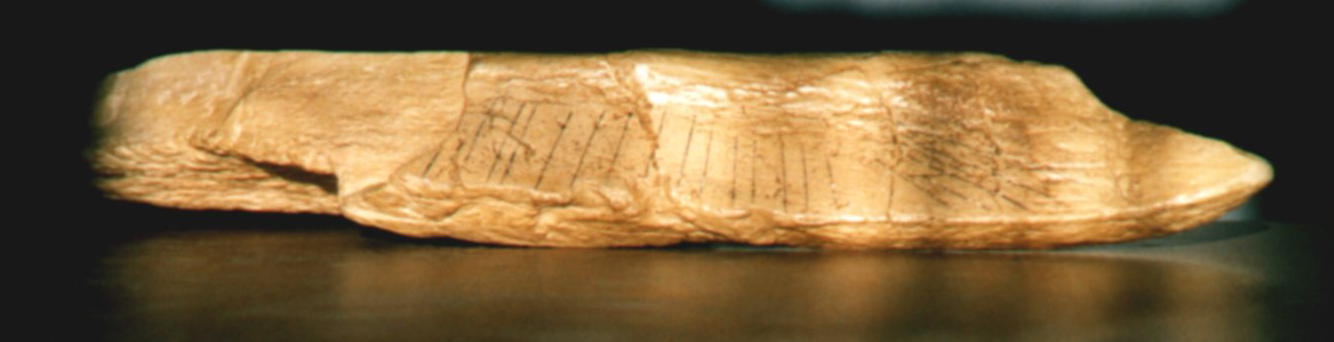
400,000 to 350,000 years old incised straight-tusked elephant tibia from Bilzingsleben, Germany

Upper Palaeolithic modern humans are well known for having etched engravings seemingly with symbolic value. As of 2018, only 27 Middle and Lower Palaeolithic objects have been postulated to have symbolic etching, out of which some have been refuted as having been caused by natural or otherwise non-symbolic phenomena (such as the fossilisation or excavation processes).

The Lower Palaeolithic ones are: a 350,000 to 400,000 year old bone from Bilzingsleben; three 380,000 year old pebbles from Terra Amata; a 250,000 year old pebble from Markkleeberg, Germany; 18 roughly 200,000 year old pebbles from Lazaret (near Terra Amata); a roughly 200,000 year old lithic from Grotte de l'Observatoire, Monaco; and a 130,000 to 200,000 year old pebble from Baume Bonne, France.

==== Colouring ====
Early modern humans and late Neanderthals (the latter especially after 60,000 years ago) made wide use of red ochre for presumably symbolic purposes as it produces a blood-like colour, though ochre can also have a functional medicinal application. Beyond these two species, ochre usage is recorded at Olduvai Gorge, Tanzania, where two red ochre lumps have been found; Ambrona where an ochre slab was trimmed down into a specific shape; and Terra Amata where 75 ochre pieces were heated to achieve a wide colour range from yellow to red-brown to red. These may exemplify early and isolated instances of colour preference and colour categorisation, and such practices may not have been normalised yet.

==== Beads ====
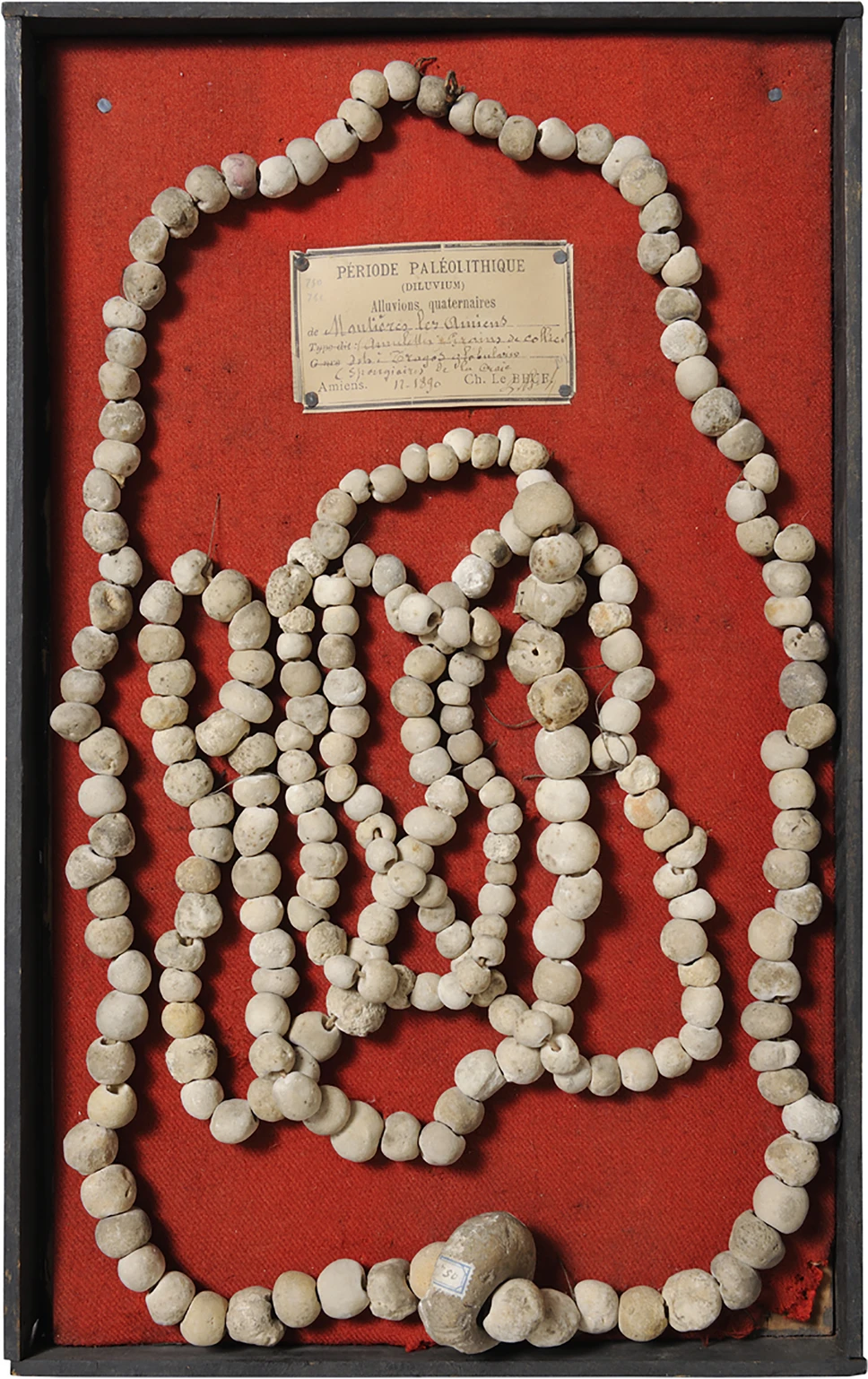
Hypothetical Porosphaera globularis necklace, probably inaccurate

Several Acheulean sites in France, England, and Germany feature many perforated, spherical Porosphaera globularis sponge fossils, which have long been speculated to represent symbolic necklace beads. This was first supposed by French archaeologist Jacques Boucher de Crèvecœur de Perthes at the St. Acheul (where the Acheulean was defined) in 1847, but his claim was completely ignored. In 1894, English archaeologist Worthington George Smith discovered 200 similar perforated fossils in Bedfordshire, England, and also speculated their function as beads (though he made no reference to Boucher de Perthes' find, possibly because he was unaware of it).

In 2005, Australian archaeologist Robert G. Bednarik reexamined the material, and concluded that—because all the Bedfordshire P. globularis fossils are sub-spherical and range 10–18 mm (0.39–0.71 in) in diameter, despite this species having a highly variable shape—they were deliberately chosen. He believed that they had been bored through completely or almost completely by some parasitic creature (i. e., through natural processes), and were then percussed on what would have been the more closed-off end to fully open the hole. He also found wear facets which he speculated were begotten from clacking against other beads when they were strung together and worn as a necklace.

In 2009, French anthropologist Solange Rigaud and colleagues noticed that the modified areas are lighter in colour than the unmodified, suggesting they were inflicted much more recently such as during excavation. They were also unconvinced that the fossils could be confidently associated with the Acheulean artefacts from the sites, and suggested that—as an alternative to archaic human activity—apparent size-selection could have been caused by either natural geological processes or 19th-century collectors favouring this specific form. In 2023, Italian archaeologist Gabriele Luigi Francesco Berruti and colleagues demonstrated that the abrasion identified by Bednarik could have occurred naturally from dirt, and reaffirmed that they probably did not come from the same layer as the Acheulean artefacts. They found no evidence of any human modification, and rejected the interpretation of them as decorative beads.

== See also ==
- Altamura Man
- Dmanisi hominins
- Early European modern humans
- Sima de los Huesos hominins
- Tunel Wielki
