= John Ehret =

- Born: 1971 (age 54–55); Karlsruhe

John Ehret (born in 1971 in Karlsruhe) is the mayor of Mauer, elected in 2012. He is the "first 'black' elected mayor in Germany in modern times", and "Baden-Württembergs erster schwarzer Bürgermeister" ("Baden-Württemberg's first black mayor"). Prior to his position as mayor, Ehret was working at the Bundeskriminalamt as law enforcement official.

== Early life ==
Ehret's father is an African American soldier who was stationed in Germany, and his birth mother was a German. Ehret has little knowledge of his biological father. His mother gave him up for adoption when he was two years old, after she was diagnosed with a brain tumour. In 1977, aged six, he was adopted by Gertrud and Helmut Ehret who moved to Mauer. After graduating from high school in 1992, he obtained a diploma to be a police officer at the Bundeskriminalamt, and subsequently worked in Wiesbaden, Berlin and Meckenheim. He has helped developing countries with the construction of police departments, and in 2012, received an award for his role in helping develop the Afghan police.

== See also ==
- Afro-Germans
