= Ehringsdorf remains =

Hominin fossil

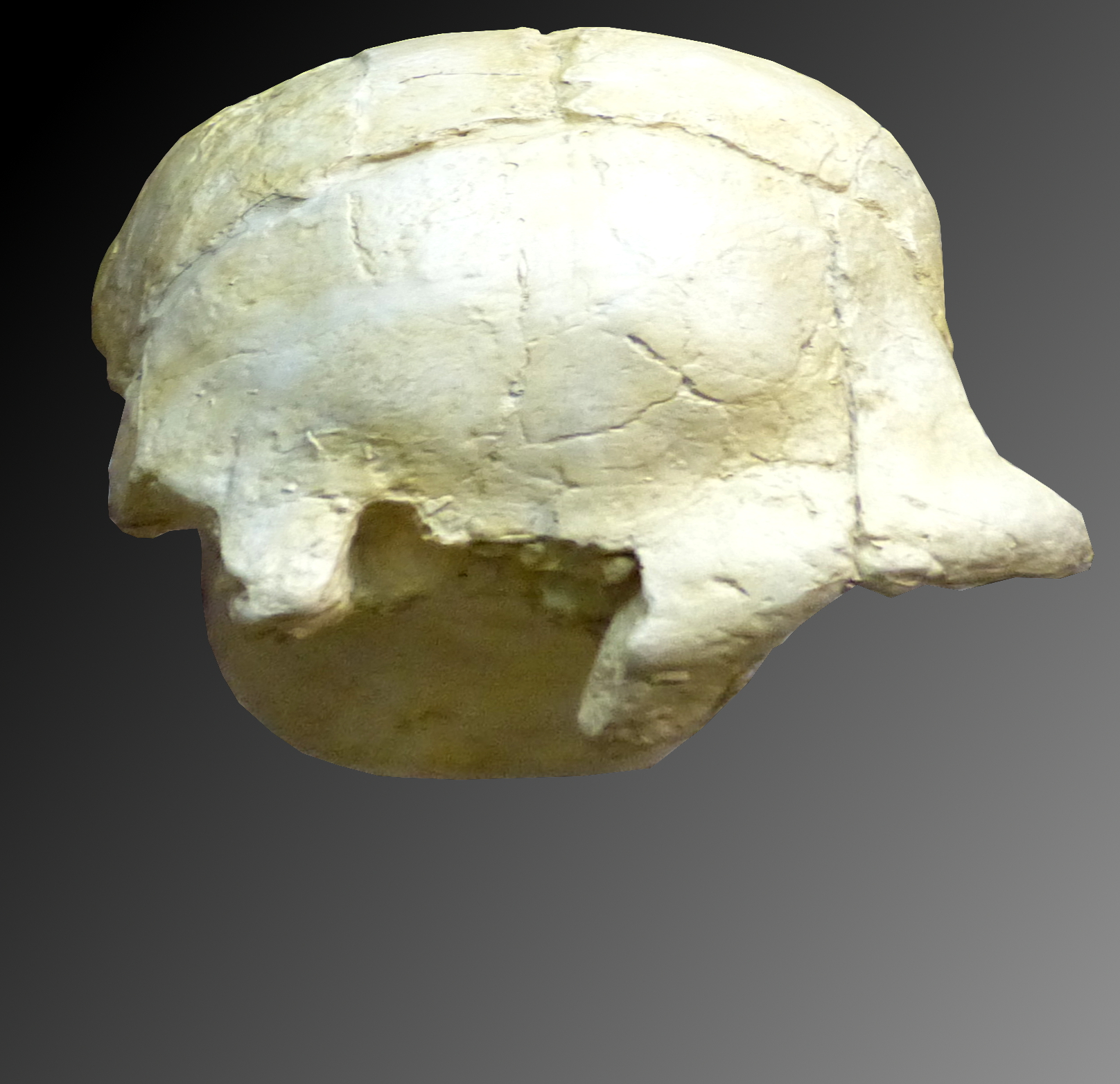
- Ehringsdorf H skull cap.
- Catalog no.: Ehringsdorf 1-9
- Common name: Ehringsdorf remains
- Species: Homo neanderthalensis
- Age: 150-120 ka
- Place discovered: Weimar, Germany
- Date discovered: 1908-1928
- Discovered by: Franz Weidenreich

The Ehringsdorf remains are the fragments of at least nine early Neanderthal individuals, exhumed from a deposit of limestone by workers at the Ehringsdorf quarries along the Ilm River, roughly 2.4 km (1.49 mi) from Weimar in Thuringia, Germany. The deposits in which this skull were found included elephant, rhinoceros, horse, and bovid fossil remains and came from the travertines belonging to the second half of the last (Eemian) interglacial period. The estimated age of the remains is between 150,000 and 120,000 years. The remains' characteristics typical of early Neanderthals include the size of the brow ridges, the long and low brain case, and the strong chinless lower jaw.

== Ehringsdorf H skull ==
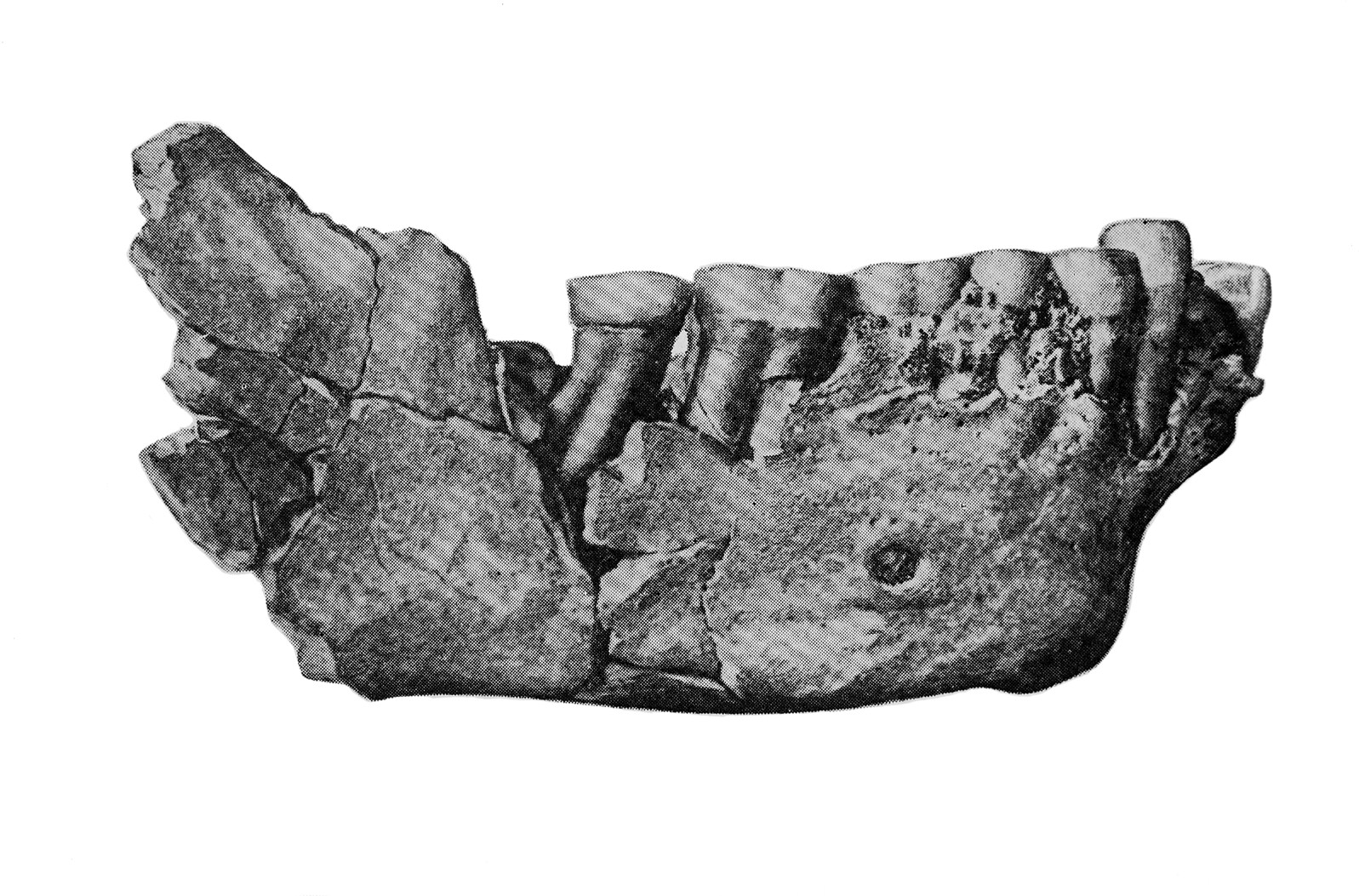
Ehringsdorf G jaw (7-13 year-old child)

In 1928, German anthropologist Franz Weidenreich published Der Schädelfund von Weimar-Ehringsdorf, (the skull find from Weimar-Ehringsdorf) where he described the Ehringsdorf H (or Ehringsdorf 9) skull-cap as that of an adult female. He suggested that the frontal area of the remains showed evidence of being struck, which led to speculation that the subject was murdered. In addition, he determined that the lack of a cranial base meant the skull had been opened for the purpose of extracting the brain. The remains, however, were so fragmentary that little attention was paid to this opinion.

Based on the fusing of the Ehringsdorf H skull and small muscular traces on the bones, Weidenreich suggested the remains to be of a female of around 20–30 years old. The skull, like the ones found before it, showed distinct ancient (pre-300 ka) attributes. There were, however, certain cranial features that appeared similar to that of anatomically modern humans, particularly of the occipital bone. The skull was abnormal in that it bulged out more in left hemisphere than in the right. Weidenreich thinks this happened post-mortem, in the layer in which the skull was found. Weidenreich also considered variations in the thickness of the skull peculiar. The Ehringsdorf endo-exocranial different is 4.6,, remarkably low for Neanderthals. As a result, Paterson erected the name Palaeoanthropus ehringsdorfensis to encapsulate the remains, although this did not stick.

Scottish anthropologist Arthur Keith made a study of the skull in 1931, concluding that it belonged to an individual less than 20 years old.
