= Mauer (Baden) =

- Municipality
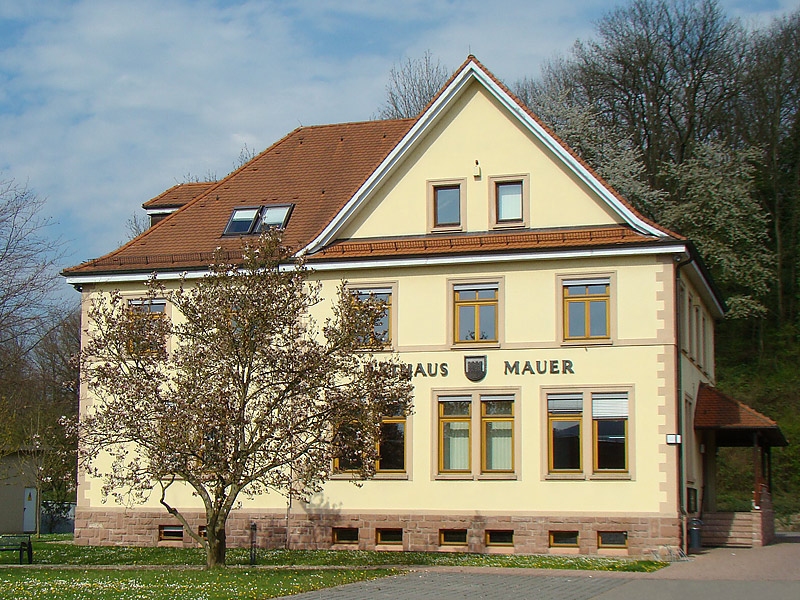
- Town hall

- Coat of arms

- Location of Mauer within Rhein-Neckar-Kreis district
- Interactive map of Mauer
- Location within Germany Location within Baden-Württemberg
- Coordinates: 49°20′20″N 08°47′55″E
- Country: Germany
- State: Baden-Württemberg
- Admin. region: Karlsruhe
- District: Rhein-Neckar-Kreis

Government
  - Mayor (2020–28): John Ehret

Area
  - Total: 6.29 km^{2} (2.43 sq mi)
- Elevation: 131 m (430 ft)

Population (2025-12-31)
  - Total: 4,081
  - Density: 649/km^{2} (1,680/sq mi)
- Time zone: UTC+01:00 (CET)
  - Summer (DST): UTC+02:00 (CEST)
- Postal codes: 69256
- Dialling codes: 06226
- Vehicle registration: HD
- Website: www.gemeinde-mauer.de

Mauer (German pronunciation: [ˈmaʊɐ]) is a municipality in southwestern Germany. It is located between Heidelberg and Sinsheim in the Rhein-Neckar district in the state of Baden-Württemberg.

On 1 June 2012, John Ehret (no party) took office as mayor. He is the first black mayor in Baden-Württemberg and thought to be the first black mayor in Germany in modern times.

== Geography ==
Mauer is located at an altitude of 130–240 m, and covers an area of 630 hectares. Of this area, 22.8% is covered by settlements, roads and paved areas, 55.3% is agricultural, and 18.6% is forested. Adjacent municipalities are, starting in the north and moving clockwise, Wiesenbach, Meckesheim, Wiesloch, Leimen, and Bammental.

== Religion ==
In 1522, the Reformation was introduced into Mauer; probably by Franz von Sickingen. Today it hosts both an evangelical and a Roman Catholic church community.

== Geology/Archaeology ==
Mauer is the location where the first remains of Homo heidelbergensis were found. The remains, a jaw, were discovered in 1907 in the local sand quarry by Daniel Hartmann, a worker there. The sandpit remained active for some time, and the original resting place of the remains no longer exists. However, the sandpit is now a nature park, and the sedimentary layers corresponding to those of the original find can be viewed on a 25-meter high section.

== Demographics ==
Population development:

Year	Inhabitants
1990	3,372
2001	3,571
2011	3,962
2021	4,136

== Persons of Interest ==
=== Honored Citizens ===
- Daniel Hartmann (1854-1952) found the lower jaw of Homo heidelbergensis.
- Gerhard Weiser (1931-2003) was Mayor of Mauer from 1962 to 1976. In 1968, he moved to the Landtag for the first time and later became the Minister of Agriculture in Baden-Württemberg from 1976 to 1996. From 1996 to 2001, he was vice-president of the state parliament. In spite of his political commitment, he remained connected to his hometown and also managed a farm there.
- Erich Mick, mayor from 1976 to 2001, founder of the association Homo heidelbergensis of Mauer e.V.

=== Other Notables Associated with Mauer ===
- Karl von Zyllnhardt (forestry officer) (1744-1816), German landlord and forestry officer.
- Karl von Zyllnhardt (jurist) (1779-1828), German jurist and politician.
