= Otto Schoetensack =

German industrialist and professor of anthropology

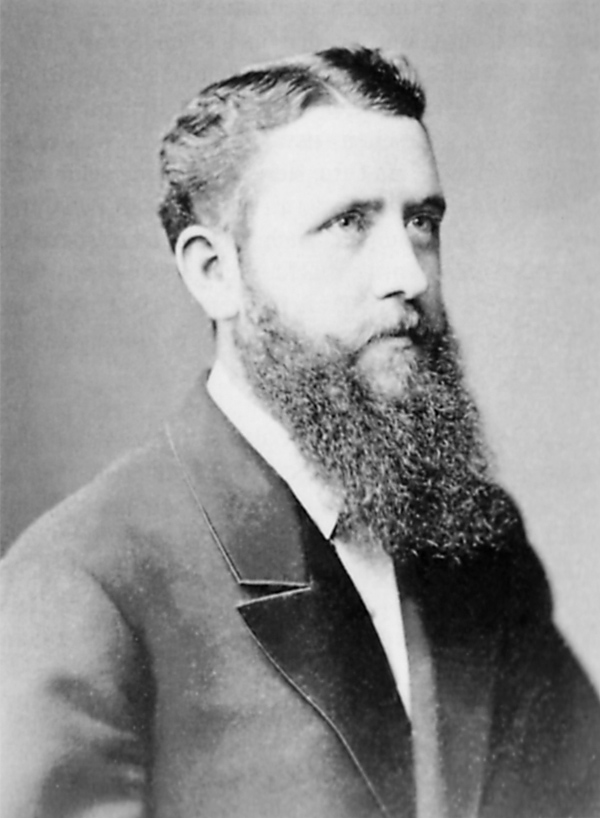
Otto Schoetensack (1882)

Otto Karl Friedrich Schoetensack (German: [ˈʃoːtn̩zak]; 12 July 1850 in Stendal – 23 December 1912 in Ospedaletti) was a German industrialist and later professor of anthropology, having retired from the chemical firm which he had founded. During a 1908 archeological dig, he oversaw the worker Daniel Hartmann who found the lower jaw of a hominid, the oldest human fossil then known, which Schoetensack later described formally as Homo heidelbergensis.

== Publications ==
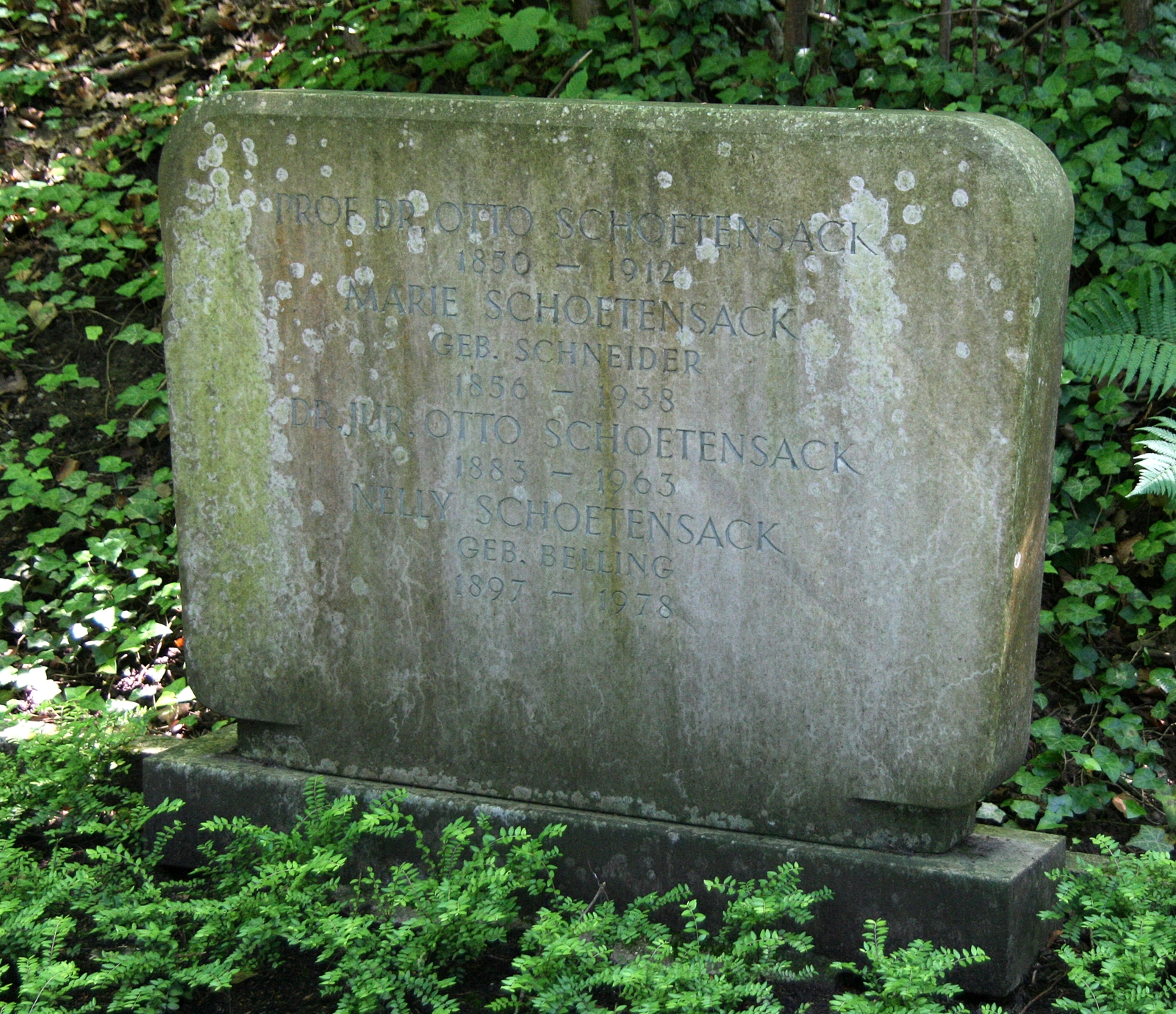
Schoetensack's grave in Heidelberg

- "Der Unterkiefer des Homo heidelbergensis aus den Sanden von Mauer bei Heidelberg" (The lower jaw of the Homo heidelbergensis out of the sands of Mauer near Heidelberg). 1908. Leipzig: Wilhelm Engelmann.
