= Olduvai =

Olduvai may refer to:

- Olduvai Gorge
- Seven Views of Olduvai Gorge
- Olduvai Gorge Museum
- Olduvai Hominid 8
- DUF1220, aka Olduvai domain; a protein domain
- Olduvai, Research Facility on Mars in the film Doom
- Oldowan a prehistoric stone tool technology, discovered first in Olduvai Gorge

== See also ==
- Oldowan
