= OH8 =

OH 8 may refer to:

- Ohio State Route 8
- Ohio's 8th congressional district
- Olduvai Hominid 8
