= Wilhelm Kattwinkel =

German neurologist and paleontologist (1866–1935)

William Kattwinkel (27 March 1866, in Kierspe – 21 January 1935, in Partenkirchen) was a German neurologist and paleontologist. He was particularly known for the discovery of the fossil deposit in the Olduvai Gorge, which in the following years delivered many findings of hominins.

== Life ==
The son of the merchant William Kattwinkel (died 1877) and Henriette Kattwinkel, born Bancklotz (1833–1898) studied science in Bonn and Strasbourg, from 1894, medicine in Bonn, Königsberg and Erlangen. He received his Ph.D. in 1892 and obtained an MD in 1894 in Munich. In 1895, he married in Schwelm Martha (born 1872), daughter of the factory owner Julius Schmidt.

After his military service Kattwinkel was a volunteer assistant to Hugo von Ziemssen and a guest student from 1900 to 1905 at Hôpital Salpêtrière and the Bicêtre in Paris. In 1902, he qualified as a professor in Munich, and in 1909 was appointed Associate Professor of Neurology and gained a passing knowledge of paleontology, especially in the German Society for Anthropology, Ethnology and Prehistory from Karl Alfred von Zittel and Johannes Ranke.

From 1910 to 1911, Kattwinkel, with his wife, undertook a privately funded research trip to German East Africa to investigate sleeping sickness In 1911 he discovered on the southeastern edge of today's Serengeti National Park a rich fossil-finding site that he named Olduvai Gorge after the Maasai word Oldupai for the sisal Sansevieria ehrenbergii and Sansevieria suffruticosa of the area. His research was subsequently supported by a further expedition of the Geological Institute of Munich and Berlin led by Ernst Freiherr Stromer von Reichenbach (Munich), August Rothpletz (1853-1918, Munich) and Wilhelm von Branca (Berlin). In 1913, under the direction of geologist Hans Reck, the expedition found the first fossils of hominins. This was followed by a further expedition in 1914 funded by Kattwinkel himself. By the outbreak of World War I, the previously described expedition of WB Sattler and G. Schulze were interned. Kattwinkel withdrew his funding and never visited the Olduvai Gorge again.

Kattwinkel launched and ran a military hospital until 1918. In the 1920s, he took up work as a doctor at "Wiggers Sanatorium" in Partenkirchen. He then resumed teaching in Munich at the Ludwig-Maximilians-Universität München (LMU), until the winter semester of 1934/35, as associate professor of internal medicine and neurology.

== Trivia ==
Louis Leakey, who was especially known for his discoveries in the Olduvai Gorge, falsely labeled William Kattwinkel as a "butterfly collector" who accidentally unearthed the fossils deposit. His misrepresentation was taken up in subsequent literature.

== Works ==
- Kattwinkel (1907). "Ein Fall von primärer systematischer Degeneration der Pyramidenbahnen. (Spastische Spinalparalyse.)" [A case of primary systemic degeneration of the pyramidal tracts. (Spastic Paraplegia).]. Deutsche Zeitschrift für Nervenheilkunde. 33 (1–2): 1–13. doi:10.1007/BF01652538.
- Kattwinkel, W.; Neumayer, L. (1907). "Über den Verlauf der sog. Helwegschen Dreikantenbahn oder Bechterews Olivenbündel (Fasciculus parolivaris)" [Over the course of the so-called Three Helwegschen edge path or Bechterew olive bundle (Fasciculus parolivaris]. Deutsche Zeitschrift für Nervenheilkunde. 33 (3–4): 229–237 & Tafel V. doi:10.1007/BF01668438.
- Kattwinkel, W.; Neumayer, L. (1910). "Über Ursprung und Verlauf des Türckschen Bündels" [About the origin and course of Turck's bundle]. Deutsche Zeitschrift für Nervenheilkunde. 39 (3–4): 183–192. doi:10.1007/BF01650000.
