= Kathy Schick =

American-born archaeologist

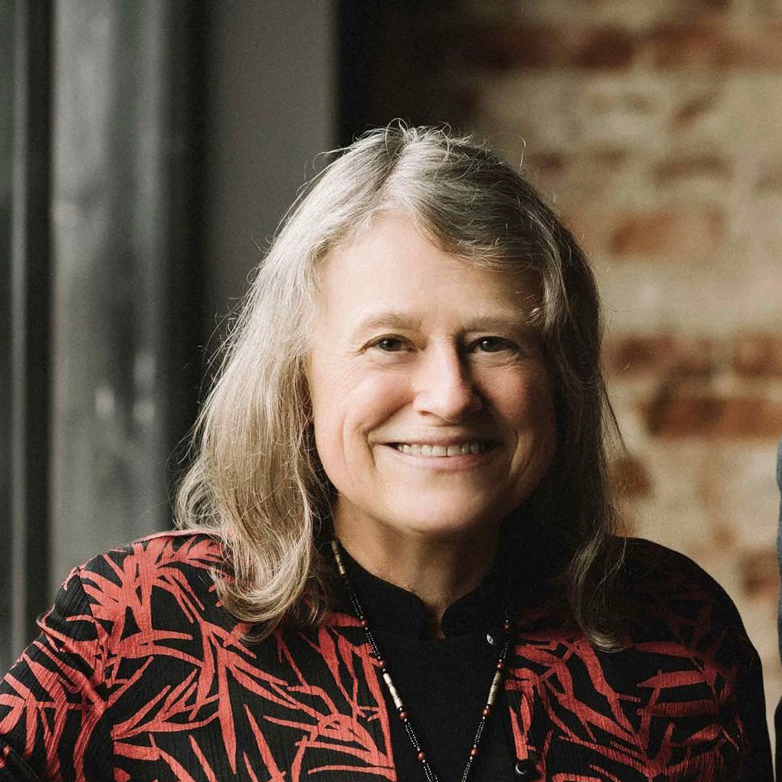
- Schick in 2019
- Born: June 6, 1949 (age 77); Akron, Ohio, United States
- Education: Kent State University (BA); University of California, Berkeley (PhD)
- Occupations: Paleoanthropologist and archaeologist
- Employer: Stone Age Institute
- Spouse: Nicholas Toth (m. 1976)

Kathy Diane Schick (born 6 June 1949) is an American archaeologist and paleoanthropologist. She is professor emeritus in the Cognitive Science Program at Indiana University and is a founder and co-director of the Stone Age Institute. Schick is most well known for her experimental work in taphonomy as well as her experimental work, with Nicholas Toth, on the stone tool technology of Early Stone Age hominins, including their work with the bonobo (“pygmy chimpanzee”) Kanzi who they taught to make and use simple stone tools similar to those made by our Early Stone Age ancestors.

== Early life and education ==
Schick was born to a middle-class family. Her father was an engraver, who inspired Schick for her interest in crafts and tools as a child. Years after her father’s passing at the age of 10, she began studying paleoanthropology in college, focusing on the study of the human brain’s evolution in relation to culture.

Schick received her Bachelor of Arts in Anthropology from Kent State University in 1974, where she graduated magna cum laude. Schick, at the end of her education, in 1978, had got special training in Flintknapping at the Lithic Technology Fieldschool in Washington State University. After graduating, she became one of the supervisors for the “Ohio dig” during her master’s program at Kent State University. Before attending UC Berkeley, Schick had attended the University of Illinois Chicago in 1980 for training in Lithic Microwear Analysis. She then went on to apply to UC Berkeley to pursue her doctorate’s degree in 1980, which was also where she met her eventual husband, Nicholas Toth, whom she married in 1976. She received a PhD in Anthropology, human evolutionary studies, Paleolithic archaeology, and African Prehistory from UC Berkeley. During these years, Schick trained for scanning electron microscopy at the University of Cambridge in 1983. After spending a few years at UC Berkeley as a postdoc, she joined Indiana University, Bloomington in 1986. Schick’s primary research interest in the importance of technology in relation to evolution became clear in 1988 when she began constructing plans for the establishment of the Center for Research into the Anthropological Foundations of Technology (CRAFT).

== Marriage to Nicholas Toth ==
In the summer of 1976, Kathy met Nicholas Toth while the two were working together on an archaeological dig in Ohio. With similar interests and both attending graduate school in Anthropology, they soon began collaborating on their research. Schick and Toth went on to attend graduate school at the University of California, Berkeley and were married during that time. Their marriage was followed by extended periods of fieldwork at Koobi Fora (East Lake Turkana), Kenya where they conducted research for the next four years under the direction of Berkeley professor Glynn Isaac and Richard Leakey of the National Museum of Kenya. This period was the beginning of a long-term research collaboration between the two which has continued for decades.

== Academic career ==
After completing her graduate degree at UC Berkeley, Schick was affiliated with their Institute of Human Origins, as a postdoctoral researcher from 1982 until 1986. During this period, she worked alongside the institute’s founder, Donald Johanson, who was known for discovering the early hominid fossil named “Lucy”. Schick began her career as a visiting professor at the University of Cape Town’s Archaeology Department in 1985 and UC Berkeley’s Anthropology Department in 1986, specifically within their Old World Lithics Laboratory. Schick’s professional affiliation with Indiana University, Bloomington dates back to 1986, where she began teaching as a professor in the College of Arts and Sciences. A year later, she became the co-director of the university’s Center for Research into the Anthropological Foundations of Technology(CRAFT) alongside her husband, Nicholas Toth. Since 2000, Schick has held a position at the Stone Age Institute as an executive board member and secretary, and later became the co-director of the institute in 2003. In addition, she teaches Anthropology and is a professor in the departments of Biology and Geological Sciences and also co-directs the university’s Human Evolutionary Studies Program.

== Field and laboratory research ==
Schick has travelled to many countries around the world as a part of her fieldwork in anthropology. Her travel experiences have allowed her to closely study various cultures, physical traits of individuals in the region, languages, and prehistory through archaeology. She has analyzed early tools in different regions through excavations and studying how they were developed and used by humans who lived in the Stone Age era. Her fieldwork also entails the study of human fossil ancestors through excavations and subsequent laboratory analyses. Specifically, her research focuses on paleoanthropology, the study of human evolution, which is interconnected with the work of physical anthropologists, archaeologists, and other individuals in related specialized fields.

Schick has participated in fieldwork relating to her areas of interest across the world for decades. She has observed archaeological sites and lithic collections in Oldowan and Acheulean sites such as Olduvai Gorge in Tanzania, Dmanisi in the Georgia, Gona and Middle Awash in Ethiopia, Nihewan Basin in China, Lake Natron in Tanzania, Ambrona in Spain, and Koobi Fora in Kenya.

=== Research of the Acheulean ===
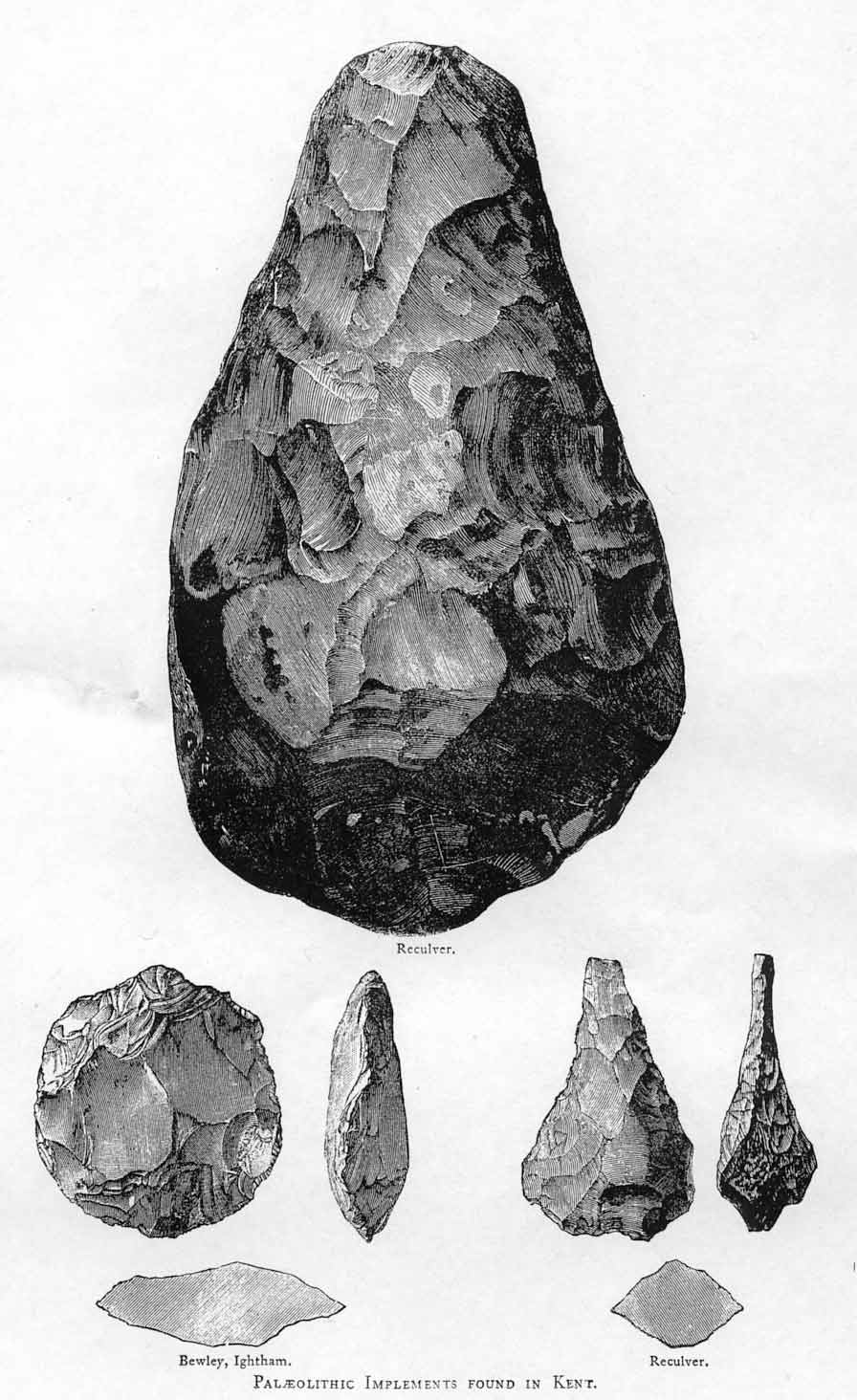
Types of acheulean

Schick has investigated the acheulean since the beginning of her anthropological and educational career. Schick started her research of the acheulean during her years at UC Berkeley. In 1981 and 1983, under the supervision of Clark Howell and Lesile Freeman, she participated in a study where they analyzed and researched the acheulean found in the Ambrona Spain. After finishing her research in Spain in 1982, she took part in another acheulean analysis in East Africa with Glynn Isaac. She then traveled back to Spain for another project, which was directed by Clark Howell, in the National Archaeological Museum of Madrid, Spain. In 1992, Schick released her article “Geoarchaeological Analysis of an Acheulean Site at Kalambo Falls, Zambia” where she dived into the different types of acheulean found on site in Zambia and analyzed them to explain the environment that led to the formation of these tools. In 1997, she took part in the Middle Awash Project. Together with J.Desmond Clark, she contributed to many research papers pertaining to the Middle Awash Project, such as the “Overview and Conclusion on the Middle Awash Acheulean”, “Archaeology of the Western Middle Awash.”, and “Archaeology of the Eastern Middle Awash.” in 2000 and “Biface Technological Development and Variability in the Acheulean Industrial Complex in the “Middle Awash Region of the Afar Rift, Ethiopia.” in 2003. In 2007, with her husband, Schick wrote another paper on the industrialization of acheulean in Middle Awash called the “Acheulean Industries of the Lower and Middle Pleistocene, Middle Awash, Ethiopia”. In 2006-Schick, Nicholas Toth, and Dietrich Stout- published their article to the Stone Age Institute on the process and development of acheulean tools, such as the Oldowan, and studied these tools development to the function of the human brain. Afterwards in 2007, Schick and Toth investigated the emergence of acheulean and the social and environmental behaviors that lead to the adaptation of this stone into a tool across the course of human evolution. They used various acheulean tools in different sizes in diverse locations with specific human evolution times to determine the use of these tools.

=== Paleoanthropologist research in China ===
Schick, Toth, Desmond Clark, researchers in Stone Age Institute, onsite Chinese researchers have all contributed to the archaeological research in Peking Man located in China. This research is ongoing and researchers at the Stone Age Institute researches are analyzing the survival tools (rocks, stones) that the early human population has used in the process of evolution and survival.

== Research with Kanzi ==
In 1990, Schick began a long-term collaborative research project, along with Nicholas Toth and psychologist Sue Savage-Rumbaugh, to observe the bonobo Kanzi as he learned to make and use stone tools. Over the course of this research, Schick and Toth worked together to teach Kanzi, by example, to flake stone and use the sharp flakes produced to cut a length of rope that would allow access to a desired food reward. The goal of this research was to compare the products of human tool makers to those of our prehistoric counterparts (which we can see archaeologically through the tools they produced), as well as to those of non-human primates who have not evolved to make stone tools. This research would allow the scientists to investigate what, if any, cognitive and biomechanical adaptations required for stone tool technology may be present in modern day primates.

Given a supply of chert for flaking and stone to use as a hammerstone, Kanzi was able to learn to flake stone, yielding sharp flakes that he was able to use to cut through rope and obtain his edible reward. The flakes and cores produced by Kanzi’s efforts were less sophisticated than the earliest stone tools recognized by archaeologists, suggesting that there is probably an earlier stone tool technology that is not recognized archaeologically.

== Olduvai Gorge Coring Project ==
In 2014, Schick, along with three other principal investigators including Nicholas Toth, Jackson Njau, and Ian Stanistreet, began the Olduvai Gorge Coring Project to extract geological cores around the gorge in order to increase our knowledge of the geological history of the Olduvai Gorge area. This coring project is the first of its kind to take place at Olduvai and the project has resulted in the extraction of more than 600 meters of geological cores from 3 different locations around the gorge, with the deepest core resulting in 236 meters of recovered core material. This project more than doubles the known stratigraphic sequence at Olduvai, adding 400,000 years of deposits dating as far back as 2.4 million years ago. The coring project is ongoing, with further coring planned and a variety of researchers analyzing the extracted core material.

== Honors and distinction ==
- In 1990, Schick, Nicholas Toth, and J. Desmond Clark became the first foreign archaeologists invited to excavate in China since the Peking Man excavations in the 1930s.
- From 1992 until 1994, Schick was the president of the Society of Africanist Archaeologists.
- In 1994, Schick received the Outstanding Young Faculty Award from Indiana University, Bloomington.
- In 1997, Schick received a Distinguished Faculty Research Award from Indiana University, Bloomington, and was recognized in "Who's Who of American Women".
- In 2000, Schick was selected as one of 50 Scientists profiled by the New York Times in the book called Scientists at Work: Profiles of Today’s Groundbreaking Scientists.
- In 2004, Schick became an Elected Fellow of the American Association for the Advancement of Science (AAAS).
- In 2019, Schick received an Honorary Doctorate from Tbilisi State University, Republic of Georgia for her contributions to Georgian archaeology.

== Bibliography ==
- Broadfield, D., Yuan, M., Schick, K., & Toth, N. (Eds.). (2010). The Human Brain Evolving: Paleoneurological Studies in Honor of Ralph L. Holloway. Stone Age Institute Press. ISBN 0-9792276-3-1.
- Schick, K. D., & Toth, N. P. (Eds.). (2008). The cutting edge: new approaches to the archaeology of human origins. Stone Age Institute Press. ISBN 0-9792276-2-3.
- Pickering, T. R., Schick, K. D., & Toth, N. P. (Eds.). (2007). Breathing life into fossils: taphonomic studies in honor of CK (Bob) Brain. Stone Age Institute Press. ISBN 0-9792276-1-5.
- Toth, N. P., & Schick, K. D. (Eds.). (2006). The Oldowan: case studies into the earliest stone age. Stone Age Institute Press. ISBN 0-9792276-0-7.
- Schick, K. D., & Toth, N. P. (1994). Making silent stones speak: Human evolution and the dawn of technology. Simon and Schuster. ISBN 0-671-87538-8.
