= Olbalbal =

Ward in Ngorongoro, Arusha, Tanzania

Olbalbal Kata ya Olbalbal
- Ward
- Location within Tanzania
- Coordinates: 2.954331°S 35.34893°E
- Country: Tanzania
- Region: Arusha Region
- District: Ngorongoro District
- Ward: Olbalbal
- Established: 1984

Government
  - Type: Council

Area
  - Total: 7.893 km^{2} (3.048 sq mi)
- Elevation: 1,405 m (4,610 ft)

Population (2016)
  - Total: 5,387
  - Density: 682.5/km^{2} (1,768/sq mi)
- Time zone: EAT
- Postcode: 237**
- Area code: 027
- Website: ngorongorodc.go.tz

Olbalbal is an administrative ward in the Ngorongoro District of the Arusha Region of Tanzania. The ward is home to the famous Olduvai Gorge. The ward covers an area of 7.893 square kilometres (3.048 sq mi) with an average elevation of 1,405 metres (4,610 ft).

In 2016, reports there were 5,387 people in the ward, from 8,969 in 2012, and 7,561 in 2002. The ward has 680 inhabitants per square kilometre (1,800/sq mi).
