= Nicholas Toth =

American archaeologist and paleoanthropologist

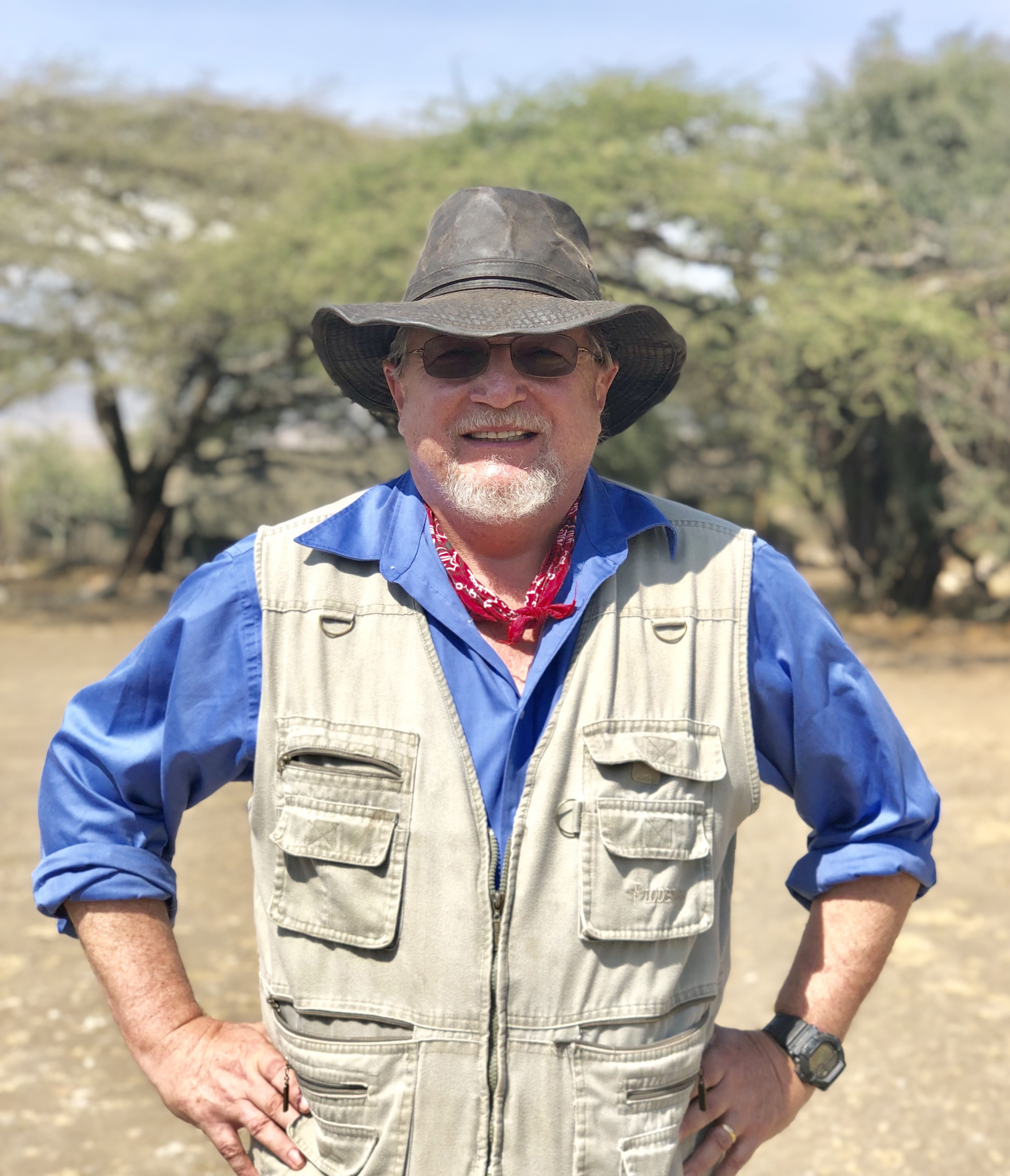
- Toth in 2019
- Born: Nicholas Patrick Toth; September 22, 1952 (age 74); Cleveland, Ohio, United States
- Education: University of California, Berkeley (PhD)
- Occupations: Paleoanthropologist and archaeologist
- Spouse: Kathy Schick (m. 1976)

Nicholas Patrick Toth (born September 22, 1952) is an American archaeologist and paleoanthropologist. He is a Professor in the Cognitive Science Program at Indiana University and is a founder and co-director of the Stone Age Institute. Toth's archaeological and experimental research has focused on the stone tool technology of Early Stone Age hominins who produced Oldowan and Acheulean artifacts which have been discovered across Africa, Asia, the Middle East, and Europe. He is best known for his experimental work, with Kathy Schick, including their work with the bonobo (“pygmy chimpanzee”) Kanzi who they taught to make and use simple stone tools similar to those made by our Early Stone Age ancestors.

== Early life and education ==
Toth was born and grew up in Cleveland, Ohio. He graduated from Brooklyn High School in 1970 and in 1974 earned a BA with distinction in Liberal Arts and Anthropology from Western College in Oxford, Ohio.

Toth attended Oxford University, England where he obtained a Post-graduate Diploma with distinction in Prehistoric Archaeology in 1975. From there he went on to study at the University of California, Berkeley, where he obtained an MA in Paleoanthropology in 1978, and a PhD in Paleoanthropology in 1982. While at Berkeley he studied with professors Glynn Isaac, J. Desmond Clark, Francis Howell, Tim White, Garniss Curtis, and Richard Hay. Toth completed the Flintknapping Field School at Washington State University in 1978, attended the Lithic Microwear Workshop at the University of Chicago in 1980, and received training in Forensic Science at the University of California in 1981. In 1983, he obtained a certificate in Scanning Electron Microscopy from the Royal Microscopial Society, Cambridge University, England. In 2004, Toth completed a course in start-up companies through the Kelly School of Business at Indiana University/Purdue University Indianapolis (IUPUI) and in 2005 he obtained a certificate from the Fundraising School at IUPUI.

== Marriage to Kathy Schick ==
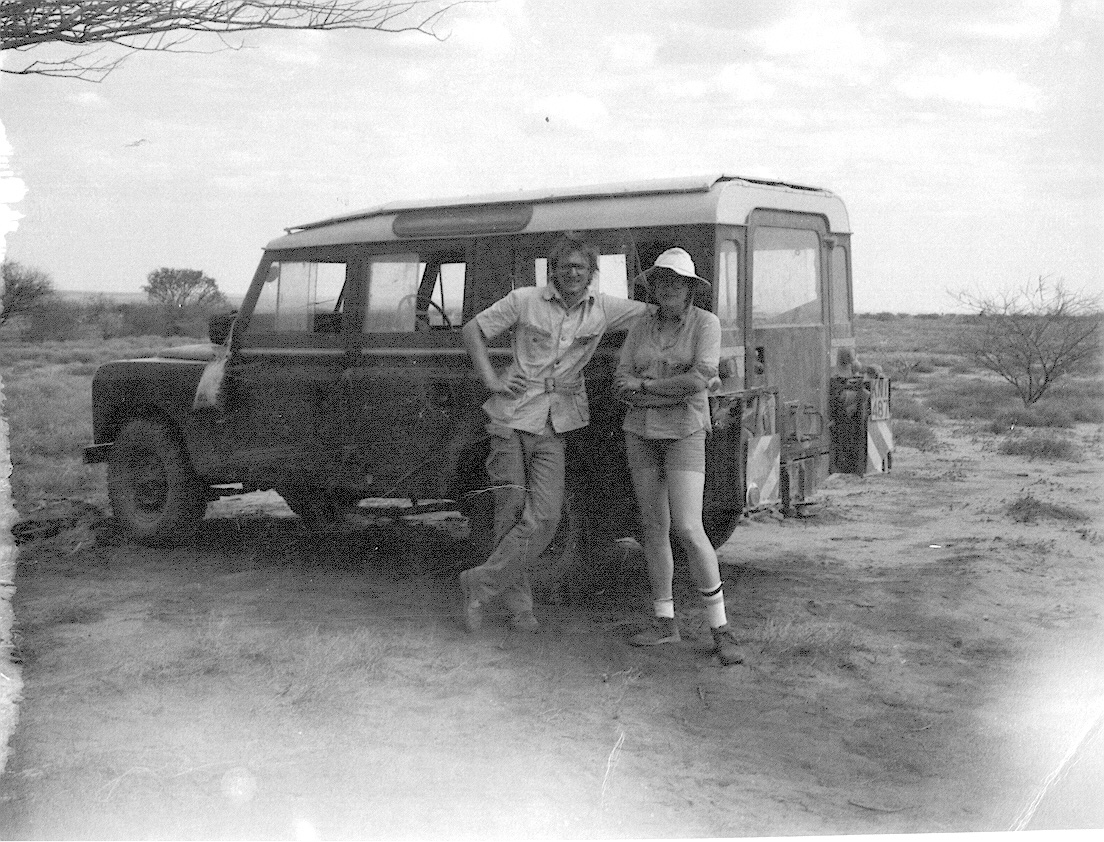
Nicholas Toth and Kathy Schick at Koobi Fora (East Lake Turkana), Kenya, 1977.

In the summer of 1976, Toth met Kathy Schick while the two were working together on an archaeological dig in Ohio. With similar interests and both attending graduate school in Anthropology, they soon began collaborating on their research. Toth and Schick went on to attend graduate school at the University of California, Berkeley and were married during that time. Their marriage was followed by extended periods of fieldwork at Koobi Fora (East Lake Turkana), Kenya where they conducted research for the next four years under the direction of Berkeley professor Glynn Isaac and Richard Leakey of the National Museum of Kenya. This period was the beginning of a long-term research collaboration between Toth and Schick which has continued for decades.

== Academic career ==
Between 1981 and 1984, Toth served as a visiting professor in the Anthropology Departments at Stanford University, the University of California, Berkeley, and the University of Cape Town, South Africa. From 1982 to 1986, he was a post-doctoral research scientist at the Institute of Human Origins in Berkeley, Ca., directed by paleoanthropologist Donald Johanson. From 1986 to the present he has been a faculty member in the College of Arts and Sciences at Indiana University, Bloomington, in the Anthropology Department and the Cognitive Science Program, and has served as an adjunct professor in the Biology Department and the Department of Earth and Atmospheric Science.

In 1986 he co-founded, with Kathy Schick, the Center for Research into the Anthropological Foundations of Technology (CRAFT) at Indiana University, and together they continue as co-directors of CRAFT. In 2003, the couple founded the Stone Age Institute, a non-profit education and research facility located in Indiana and dedicated to research into human origins. Toth and Schick continue as co-directors and executive board members of the Stone Age Institute.

Over the course of his career Toth has participated in public education programs which help provide children and adults access to educational materials and related media on subjects such as human evolution, archaeology, anthropology, and big history. One such program is a big history project with Kathy Schick titled "Origins: From the Big Bang to the World Wide Web" which began in 2010 with a multi-year museum installation at the Mathers Museum of World Cultures as well as the permanent, multifaceted educational website which has been running since 2010. Another example of Toth's public education projects are the video courses he created for the Big History Project, which is a public education program created by Bill Gates and David Christian. Toth's courses for the project include one titled Introduction to Archaeology and another titled Making Stone Tools, both of which can be viewed free of charge on YouTube or Khan Academy. In addition to participation in programs such as these, Toth and Schick, as directors of the Stone Age Institute, have made pdf files of the research volumes published by the Stone Age Institute Press available as free downloads.

== Field and laboratory research ==
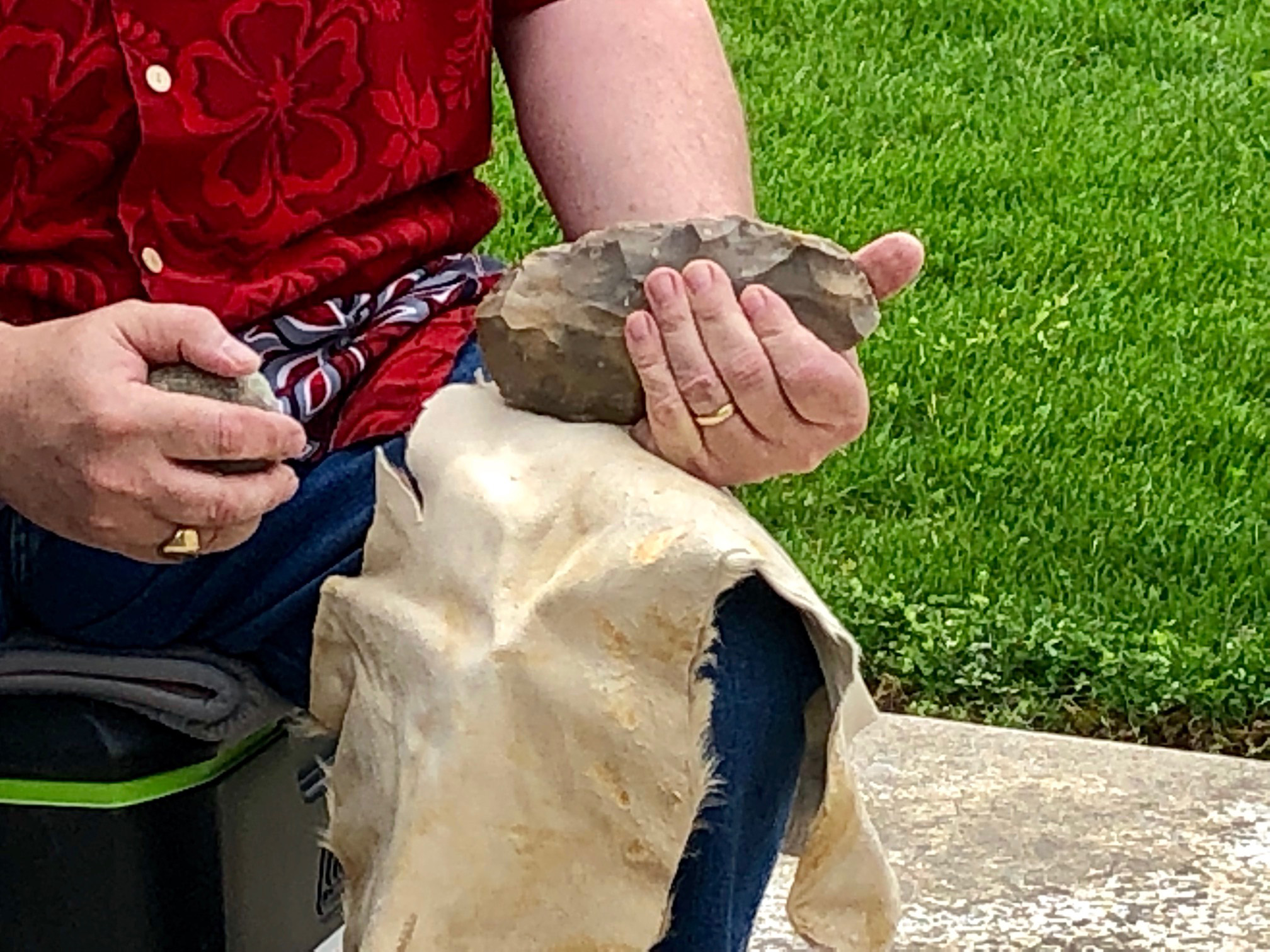
Toth making an experimental Acheulean handaxe

Toth has engaged in field and laboratory research since the late 1970s, resulting in scientific publications on a variety of topics including human evolution, African prehistory, Paleolithic studies, the evolution of human intelligence, lithic technology, raw materials of antiquity, experimental archaeology, microscopic approaches to archaeology, faunal analysis, and taphonomy, geoarchaeology, ethnoarchaeology, primate studies, history of evolutionary thought, and Big History (studying and teaching history from the Big Bang to recent times).

Toth has conducted archaeological field research and studied the lithic assemblages from Oldowan and Acheulean sites including Olduvai Gorge in Tanzania, Dmanisi in the Republic of Georgia, Gona in Ethiopia, Middle Awash in Ethiopia, Nihewan Basin in China, Lake Natron in Tanzania, Ambrona in Spain, and Koobi Fora in Kenya. During investigations at Gona, Ethiopia in 1999, Toth discovered the fossil cranium of a Homo erectus individual which dates to about 1.2 million years ago.

In his decades of experimental research into the manufacture and use of early stone tools, Toth has replicated thousands of Oldowan and Acheulean artifacts, many of which he has used in controlled experiments involving such things as cutting through thick hides and the butchering of large animals (all animals used in these studies had died of natural causes, no animals were killed for the purposes of this research). This research revealed that the most important tools to the early stone tool makers may have been the sharp-edged flakes that were removed from the choppers and pebble tools, rather than the choppers and pebble tools themselves, as had been previously supposed. Flake assemblages had been a largely ignored part of archaeological collections from sites of this time period because they were thought to have been a by-product of the manufacture of the more formal choppers and other pebble tools. Toth’s research supported the idea that these flakes were the simple, highly effective base of early stone tool technology.

== Research with Kanzi ==
In 1990, Toth began a long-term collaborative research project, along with Kathy Schick and psychologist Sue Savage-Rumbaugh, to observe the bonobo Kanzi as he learned to make and use stone tools. Over the course of this research, Toth and Schick worked together to teach Kanzi, by example, to flake stone and use the sharp flakes produced to cut a length of rope that would allow access to a desired food reward. The goal of this research was to compare the products of human tool makers to those of our prehistoric counterparts (which we can see archaeologically through the tools they produced), as well as to those of non-human primates who have not evolved to make stone tools. This research would allow the scientists to investigate what, if any, cognitive and biomechanical adaptations required for stone tool technology may be present in modern day primates.

Given a supply of chert for flaking and stone to use as a hammerstone, Kanzi was able to learn to flake stone, yielding sharp flakes that he was able to use to cut through rope and obtain his edible reward. The flakes and cores produced by Kanzi’s efforts were less sophisticated than the earliest stone tools recognized by archaeologists, suggesting that there is probably an earlier stone tool technology that is not recognized archaeologically.

== Olduvai Gorge Coring Project ==
In 2014, Toth, along with three other principal investigators including Kathy Schick, Jackson Njau, and Ian Stanistreet, began the Olduvai Gorge Coring Project to extract geological cores around the gorge in order to increase our knowledge of the geological history of the Olduvai Gorge area. This coring project is the first of its kind to take place at Olduvai and the project has resulted in the extraction of more than 600 meters of geological cores from 3 different locations around the gorge, with the deepest core resulting in 236 meters of recovered core material. This project more than doubles the known stratigraphic sequence at Olduvai, adding 400,000 years of deposits dating as far back as 2.4 million years ago. The coring project is ongoing, with further coring planned and a variety of researchers analyzing the extracted core material.

== Honors and distinctions ==
- In 1990, Toth, Kathy Schick, and J. Desmond Clark became the first foreign archaeologists invited to excavate in China since the Peking Man excavations in the 1930s.
- Toth received Indiana University's annual Outstanding Faculty Award in 1997.
- Toth was honored with the invitation to deliver the annual Memorial Lecture for the L.S.B. Leakey Foundation in San Francisco in 2001.
- In 2003 Toth became an Elected Fellow of the American Association for the Advancement of Science (AAAS).
- In 2019 Toth received an Honorary Doctorate from Tbilisi State University, Republic of Georgia for his contributions to Georgian archaeology.

== Bibliography ==
- Broadfield, D., Yuan, M., Schick, K., & Toth, N. (Eds.). (2010). The Human Brain Evolving: Paleoneurological Studies in Honor of Ralph L. Holloway. Stone Age Institute Press. ISBN 0979227631.
- Schick, K. D., & Toth, N. P. (Eds.). (2008). The cutting edge: new approaches to the archaeology of human origins. Stone Age Institute Press. ISBN 0979227623.
- Pickering, T. R., Schick, K. D., & Toth, N. P. (Eds.). (2007). Breathing life into fossils: taphonomic studies in honor of CK (Bob) Brain. Stone Age Institute Press. ISBN 0979227615.
- Toth, N. P., & Schick, K. D. (Eds.). (2006). The Oldowan: case studies into the earliest stone age. Stone Age Institute Press. ISBN 0979227607.
- Schick, K. D., & Toth, N. P. (1994). Making silent stones speak: Human evolution and the dawn of technology. Simon and Schuster. ISBN 0671875388.
