= Middle Awash Project =

International research expedition conducted in Afar Region, Ethiopia

The Middle Awash Project is an international research expedition conducted in the Afar Region of Ethiopia with the goal of determining the origins of humanity. The project has the approval of the Ethiopian Culture Ministry and a strong commitment to developing Ethiopian archaeology, paleontology and geology research infrastructure. This project has discovered over 260 fossil specimens and over 17,000 vertebrate fossil specimens to date ranging from 200,000 to 6,000,000 years in age. Researchers have discovered the remains of four hominin species, the earliest subspecies of homo sapiens as well as stone tools. All specimens are permanently held at the National Museum of Ethiopia, where the project's laboratory work is conducted year round.

== Geography ==
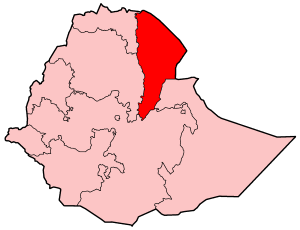
The Afar Region of Ethiopia

The Middle Awash Project takes place in a semi arid, rather remote part of the Afar rift. Between 5.8 and 4.4 Ma, the region was grassland and wetland. Today, the rift is a basin divided by fault lines and filled with volcanoes. Also called the Afar Depression, it has long been inhabited by the nomadic Afar people of Ethiopia. The Ethiopian Plateau lies to the west of the depression, the Danakil block to the northeast, the Ali-Sabieh block to the southeast, and the Somalian Plateau to the south.

The study area is bounded in the south by Gewane town and the Arso River and the north end touches the Talalak River. The rift margin marks the western end of the study area, while the Gewane-Adaitu highway lies on its east.

Middle Awash is much larger than other nearby sites, such as Olduvai Gorge and Hadar. This is because the fossil potential is spaced out across the area. In fact, not even a quarter of the area contains any possibility of bearing fruit. Fossils found in the Middle Awash are located in small, scattered windows. Therefore, the fossil record is more fragmented as opposed to a continuous view of the past.

To accurately date fossils and artifacts, researchers use “geology and structural, geomorphological, sedimentological, volcanological, paleomagnetic, tephrochemical, isotopic, and radiometric dating studies.”

== Project history ==
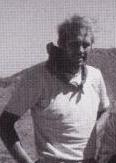
Jon Kalb

The recognition of Middle Awash as a site of value to the field of paleontology was a gradual process. Some sources say that the first European exploration was led by a British mining engineer. Since he failed to see anything of note in the area, there is less of a record of this. In 1938 two Italian geologists Michele Gortani and Angelo Bianchi, conducted a geological survey of the area. The Italians also did not see anything of potential importance in their survey. The first European to take paleontological interest in Middle Awash was a French professor named Maurice Taieb who surveyed the area in the 1960s. Ultimately, Taieb decided to focus his studies on an area North of Middle Awash called Hadar. Taieb recruited Yves Coppens, Don Johanson and Jon Kalb among others to help him with his work at Hadar (work is still taking place at Hadar to this day). This research team in 1972 and within 10 years found the first fossil hominids in the Afar Rift.

In 1975 Jon Kalb decided to leave the Hadar team to start the Rift Valley Research Mission in Ethiopia (RVRME for short). The next year, the RVRME team discovered a Middle Pleistocene era hominid at a site known as Bodo. While fieldwork on this mission only went on until 1978, RVRME laid the groundwork for the Middle Awash Project, even going so far as to propose nomenclature for the entire Southern Afar Region. Though the nomenclature served as the basis of the past several decades of research, on their official website the Middle Afar Project had this to say: “the RVRME stratigraphic nomenclature impossible to apply because descriptions of beds and marker horizons were imprecise, upper and lower contacts were undefined, there was no valid mapping of a reference area, and boundaries between formations were set systematically at fault contacts. Radiometric dating and tephrachemistry were not done by the RVRME”.

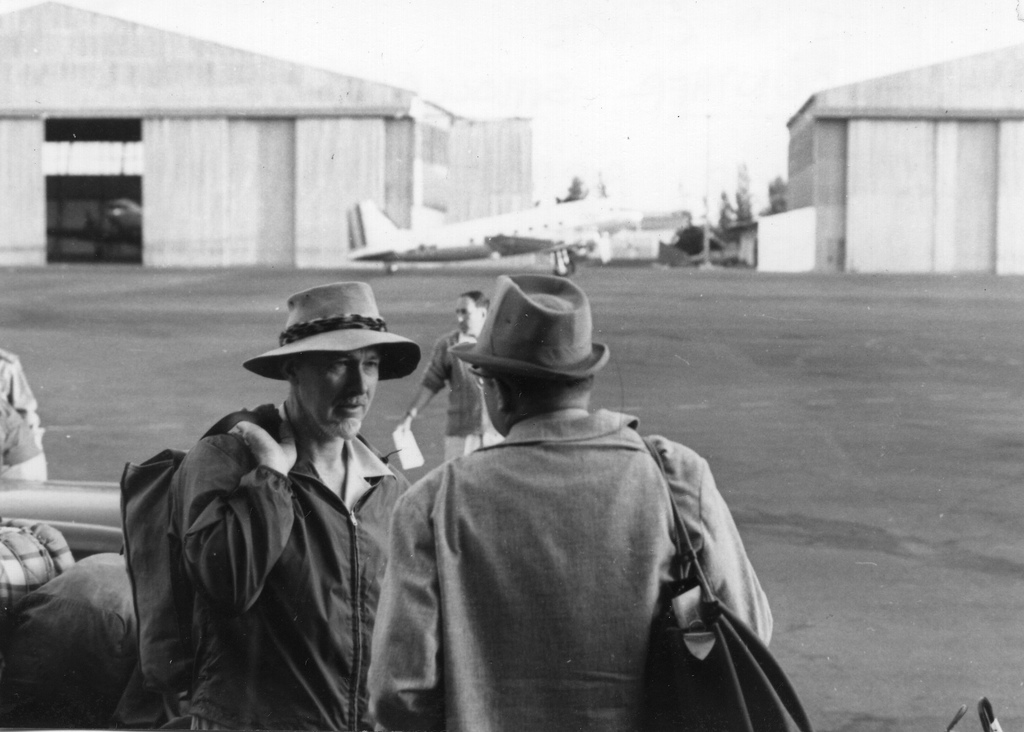
J. Desmond Clark talking with a colleague at an airport in West Africa.

In 1981 Professor J. Desmond Clark, a prominent African prehistory expert of the 20th century, initiated the Middle Awash Project with the approval of the Ethiopian Culture Ministry. During the Project's initial run researchers including Professor and paleontology expert Tim White explored both sides of the river. Clark recapped their time in his 1984 paper as when the “Archaeological excavations were undertaken at Bodo and Hargufia, the first radiometric dates for the area were determined, and the first Pliocene hominids were recovered”.

Clark and White were planning to continue their research in Middle Awash however circumstances made this impossible. In October 1982 the Ethiopian government banned all foreign prehistory expeditions while they reformulated their policies on international researchers. It was a response to foreign expeditions perceived inability to incorporate locals into their teams, tension between the Cultural Ministry (who had the authority to give foreign expedition permits since before the end of the monarchy in 1974) and the University of Addis Ababa (who wanted a greater role in expeditions), and the circumstances leading to the forced departure of RVRME lead researcher Jon Kalb in 1978 due to later disproven rumors that he was a CIA agent. Clark and White went to Addis Ababa to try and persuade the government to change their position. They were unsuccessful and had to submit a report to the National Science Foundation. The Middle Awash Project did not make it back to Ethiopia until 1990 when research resumed.

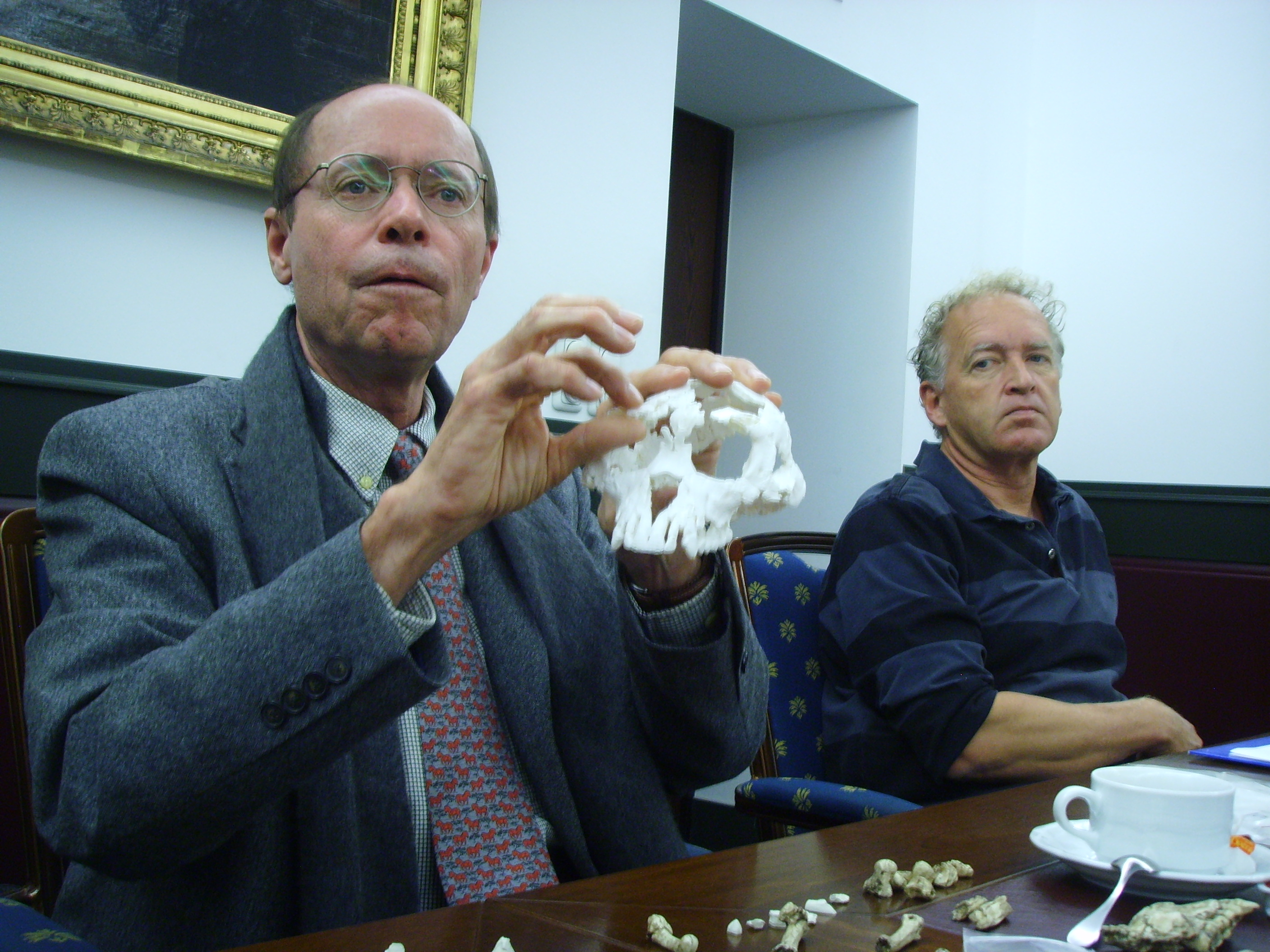
Tim White with a cast of "Ardi", a well known Ardipithecus Ramidus fossil

Upon the revival of the Middle Awash Project in 1990 there were a few slight changes in leadership. It was at this point that Tim White succeeded J.Desmond Clark as lead researcher. The other notable change that happened was by 1992 Dr.Giday WoldeGabriel joined the expedition as the Head of Geographical Studies and helped them finish the bulk of their work on the East Side of the Awash River.

== Key discoveries ==
Middle Awash contains fossils existing from about 6 million years ago to 200 thousand years ago.

=== Ardipithecus kadabba ===
Ardipithicus kadabba was discovered in 1997 on the Western Side, at site Asa Koma, by Yohannes Haile Selassie and Giday WoldeGabriel. Ardipithecus kadabba is one of the earliest known hominids from the Late Miocene period. It was first announced in 2001, and further remains were announced in 2004. The Specimens found represent at least 7 individuals and were dated to 5.8-5.2 Ma. Primarily dental fossils were found but they do include a clavicle, a hand phalanx, ulna fragments and humerus fragments.

Ar. Kadabba was originally considered a part of Ar. ramidus but was differentiated due to significant difference in their teeth. The presence of self sharpening upper canines was one such difference. Postranial evidence is less conclusive, as conflicting evidence both supports and opposes bipedalism.

=== Ardipithecus ramidus ===
Ardipithecus ramidus was discovered by Tim White in 1992 at Aarmis in Middle Awash. The initial assemblage was made up of 13 dental fragments, some cranial fragments, some postcranial fragments, including from the radius and ulna. Since, over 100 total specimens have been discovered from 36 individuals.

While originally considered a new species of Australopithecus, this changed due to difference in the size of the molars and premolars, which fell outside the range of Australopithecus. It was then given a new genus, Ardipithecus. Ardipithecus ramidus was first recognized as a new genus and species in 1994 and 1995.

In 2009, a complete description of a partial skeleton called “Ardi” was published in the journal Science. It was dated to approximately 4.4 Ma and was 120 cm tall and weighed 50 kg. The fossil was extremely fragmented and required much reconstruction, but eventually proved valuable for the knowledge of Ar. Ramidus.

Similar to chimpanzees, Ar. Ramidus shows no signs of sexual dimorphism. Its reconstructed cranium is smaller than those of later hominins, and stable isotope analysis suggests a more omnivorous diet than great apes. Additionally, canines and third premolars set Ar. Ramidus apart from modern African Apes. These differences present evidence that canines were not as necessary for fighting and intimidation in Ar. Ramidus. Ar. Ramidus has a more primitive postcrania than subsequent hominins (had a primitive fully abductable big toe), but also demonstrated evidence of bipedalism, such as an inflexible midfoot. The pelvis has both primitive traits and traits closer to later hominids. While the ilia is relatively broad and representative of later hominids, the ischium is essentially identical to those of the Apes. Finally, the flexibility of the wrist suggests bipedalism.

=== Australopithecus anamensis ===
Australopithecus anamensis was found at Asa Issie and Aramis 14, both located in Middle Awash. Fossils found at Asa Issie include “2 partial maxillary dentitions, a partial metatarsal shaft, a foot phalanx, a hand phalanx, 4 vertebral fragments, and a proximal femur” belonging to at least 2 specimens.

The cheek teeth of Au. anamensis are much larger than that of Ar. Ramidus, but approximately equal to Au. afarensis. Both individuals have relatively large canines and thicker molar enamel than Ar. Ramidus.

There is little postcranial evidence for Au. Anamensisfound at Asa Issie. The hand phalanx is similar to those of Australopithecus and the femur is on the more primitive side of the range in Au. Afarensis. Postcrania found outside of Asa Issie suggests bipedalism and strong, tree-climbing arms.

=== Australopithecus garhi ===
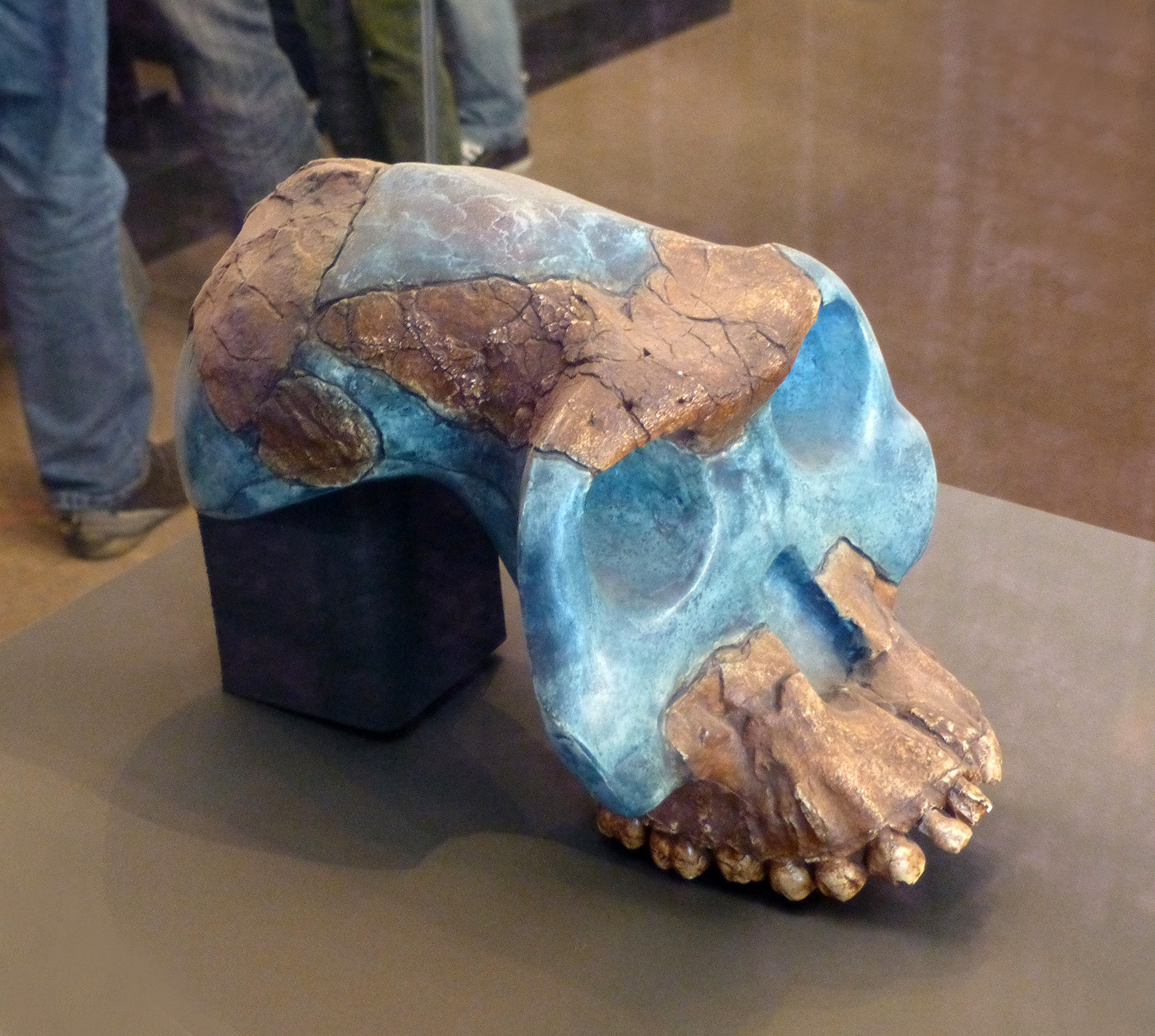
A reconstructed Australopithecus Garhi skull from the National Museum of Ethiopia.

Australopithecus garhi was discovered by Tim White in the Bouri Peninsula area of Middle Awash. It was announced in 1999. Au. Garhi has a holotype of a fragmented skull. The skull has all teeth but the left second and third molars, and additionally contains fragments of the frontal, parietal, and maxilla.

Similarities in the cranial morphology to Au. Afarensis include the shape of the braincase and the relatively small brain size. The canines and incisors fall into the size range of Au. Afarensis, but the premolars and molars are comparatively very large. Pa. Boisei is the only hominin with larger post canines. Au. Garhi additionally has a thinner plate and cheekbones that flare less than usual. Additionally, Homo has wear patterns in cheek teeth like Au. Garhi.

Limb fossils, such as a left femur, right humerus, radius, and ulna, parts of the fibula, and pieces of the foot, are located 278 meters from the skull. Some argue that these limb bones belong to the same specimen as the skull.

This postcranial evidence cannot be ascribed with complete certainty to Au. Garhi. It does, however, possess attributes of both australopiths and homo. The phalanx is identical to that of Au. Afarensis. The limbs are a strange combination of resemblances to humans and australopiths, possibly implying a combination of bipedalism and climbing.

=== Homo sapiens idaltu ===
These earliest known Homo sapiens were discovered in 1997 at Herto Bouri by Tim White. It is dated to 0.16 Ma (160,000 years). It was first announced as a subspecies "idaltu" in 2003, but is often called “Herto Man.” The skull of Herto Man has features too archaic to be Homo sapiens, but is considered a direct ancestor of today's humans.

== Current project focus ==
The work of the Middle Awash Project is currently focused on the sites West of the Awash River because while there has been a long tradition of field work taking place on both sides, the Eastern side has been more thoroughly investigated. Lab work is primarily focused on fossils dated to approximately 4.4 million years ago as well as assembling additional Ardipithecus ramidus evidence for publication.
