= Olduvai Gorge =

National Historic Site of Tanzania

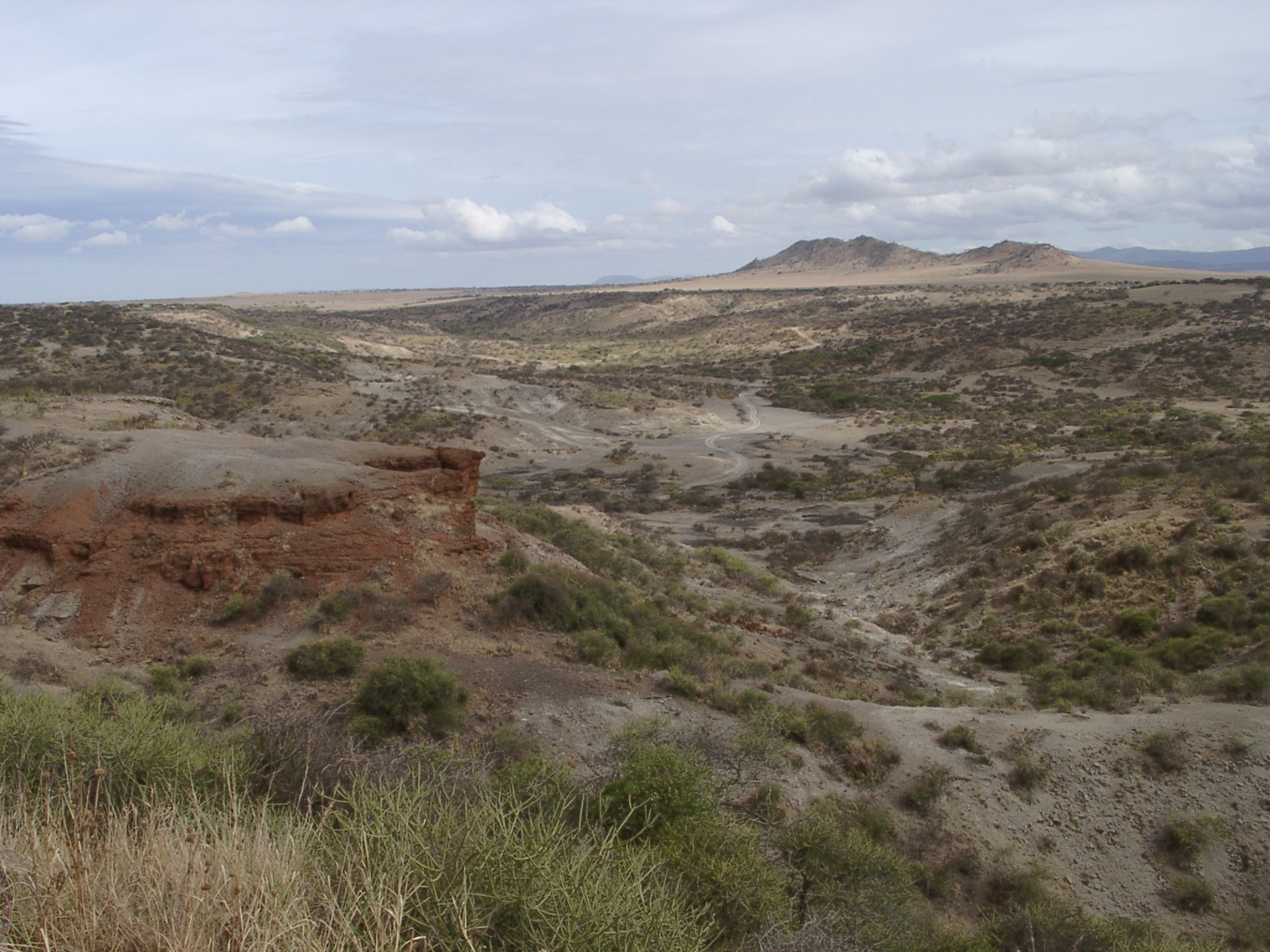
- View of Olduvai Gorge

- Site Location in Tanzania
- 2°59′37″S 35°21′04″E
- Type: Archaeological
- Location: Ngorongoro District, Arusha Region, Tanzania
- Region: Eastern Africa

Site notes
- Length: 48 km (30 mi)
- Excavation dates: 1913, 1935, 1941, 1953, 1955, 1958 & 1960
- Archaeologists: Wilhelm Kattwinkel, Louis Leakey, Mary Leakey, Percy Edward Kent & Jonathan Leakey
- Condition: Excavated
- Owner: Tanzanian Government
- Management: Antiquities Division, Ministry of Natural Resources and Tourism
- Public access: Yes

National Historic Sites of Tanzania
- Official name: Oldupai Gorge
- Type: Pre-historic

The Olduvai Gorge or Oldupai Gorge is a paleoanthropological site in northern Tanzania. Many sites exposed by the gorge have proven invaluable in furthering understanding of early human evolution. A steep-sided ravine in the Great Rift Valley that stretches across East Africa, it is about 48 km (30 mi) long, and is located in the eastern Serengeti Plains within the Ngorongoro Conservation Area in the Olbalbal ward located in Ngorongoro District of Arusha Region, about 45 kilometres (28 miles) from Laetoli, another important archaeological locality of early human occupation. The British/Kenyan paleoanthropologist-archeologist team of Mary and Louis Leakey established excavation and research programs at Olduvai Gorge that achieved great advances in human knowledge. The site is registered as one of the National Historic Sites of Tanzania.

The gorge takes its name from the Maasai word oldupai which means "the place of the wild sisal" as the East African wild sisal (Dracaena hanningtonii) grows abundantly throughout the gorge area. Twenty-five kilometers downstream of Lake Ndutu and Lake Masek, the gorge is the result of up to 90 m (300 ft) erosion cutting into the sediments of a Pleistocene lake bed. A side gorge, originating from Lemagrut Mountain, joins the main gorge 8 km (5.0 mi) from the mouth. This side gorge follows the shoreline of a prehistoric lake, rich in fossils and early hominin sites. Periodic flows of volcanic ash from Olmoti and Kerimasi helped to ensure preservation of the fossils in the gorge.

The locality is significant in showing the increasing developmental and social complexities in the earliest Hominina, largely revealed in the production and use of stone tools. Prior to tools, evidence of scavenging and hunting can be noted—highlighted by the presence of gnaw marks that predate cut marks—and of the ratio of meat versus plant material in the early hominin diet. The collecting of tools and animal remains in a centralised area is evidence of developing social interaction and communal activity. All these factors indicate an increase in cognitive capacities at the beginning of the period of hominids transitioning to homininina—that is, to human clade.

Homo habilis, probably the first early human species, occupied Olduvai Gorge approximately 1.9 million years ago (mya); then came a contemporary australopithecine, Paranthropus boisei, 1.8 mya, followed by Homo erectus, 1.2 mya. Homo sapiens, which is estimated to have emerged roughly 300,000 years ago, is thought to have occupied sites in the gorge 17,000 years ago.

== History ==
=== Discovery and research ===
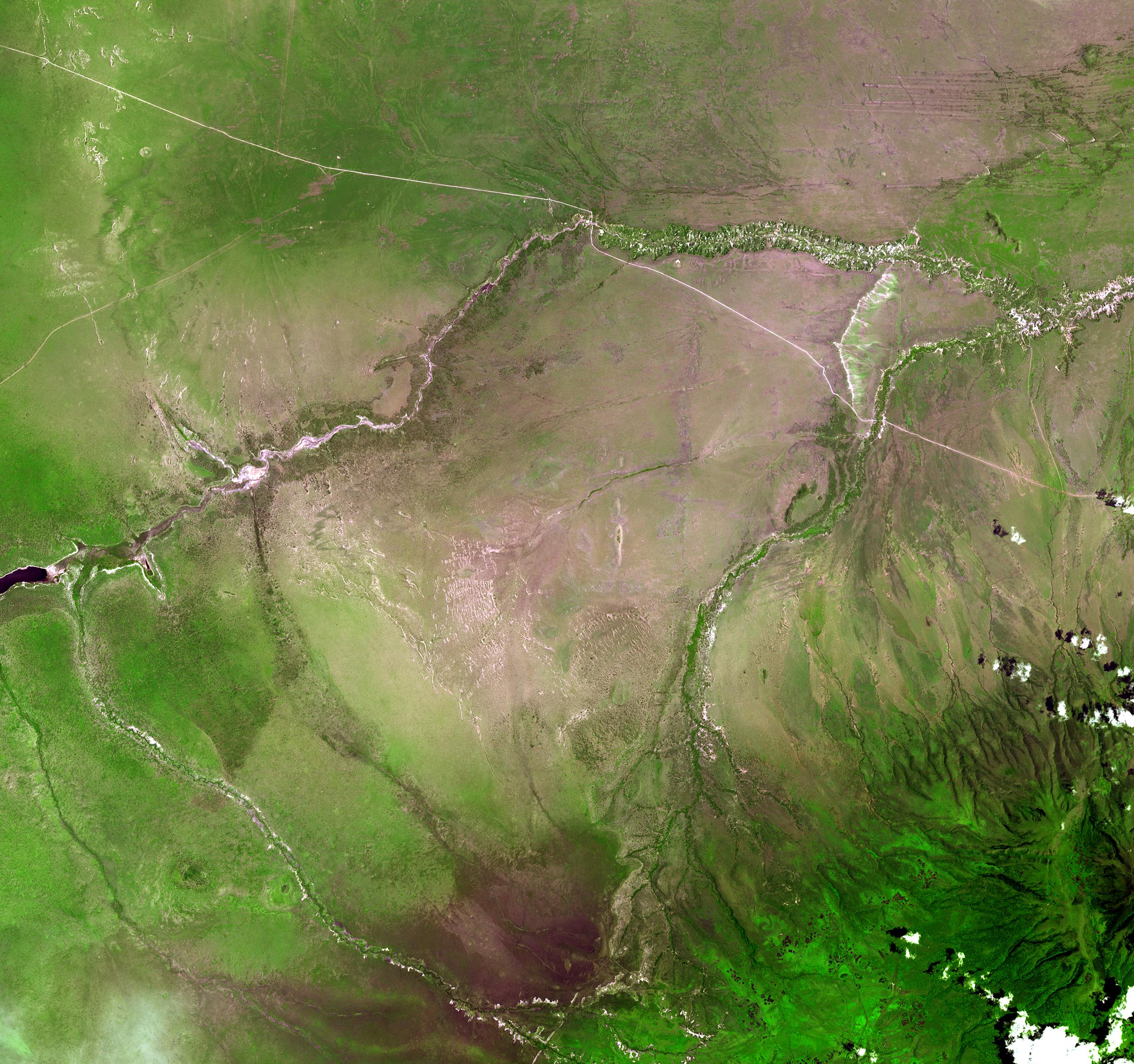
Olduvai Gorge from space

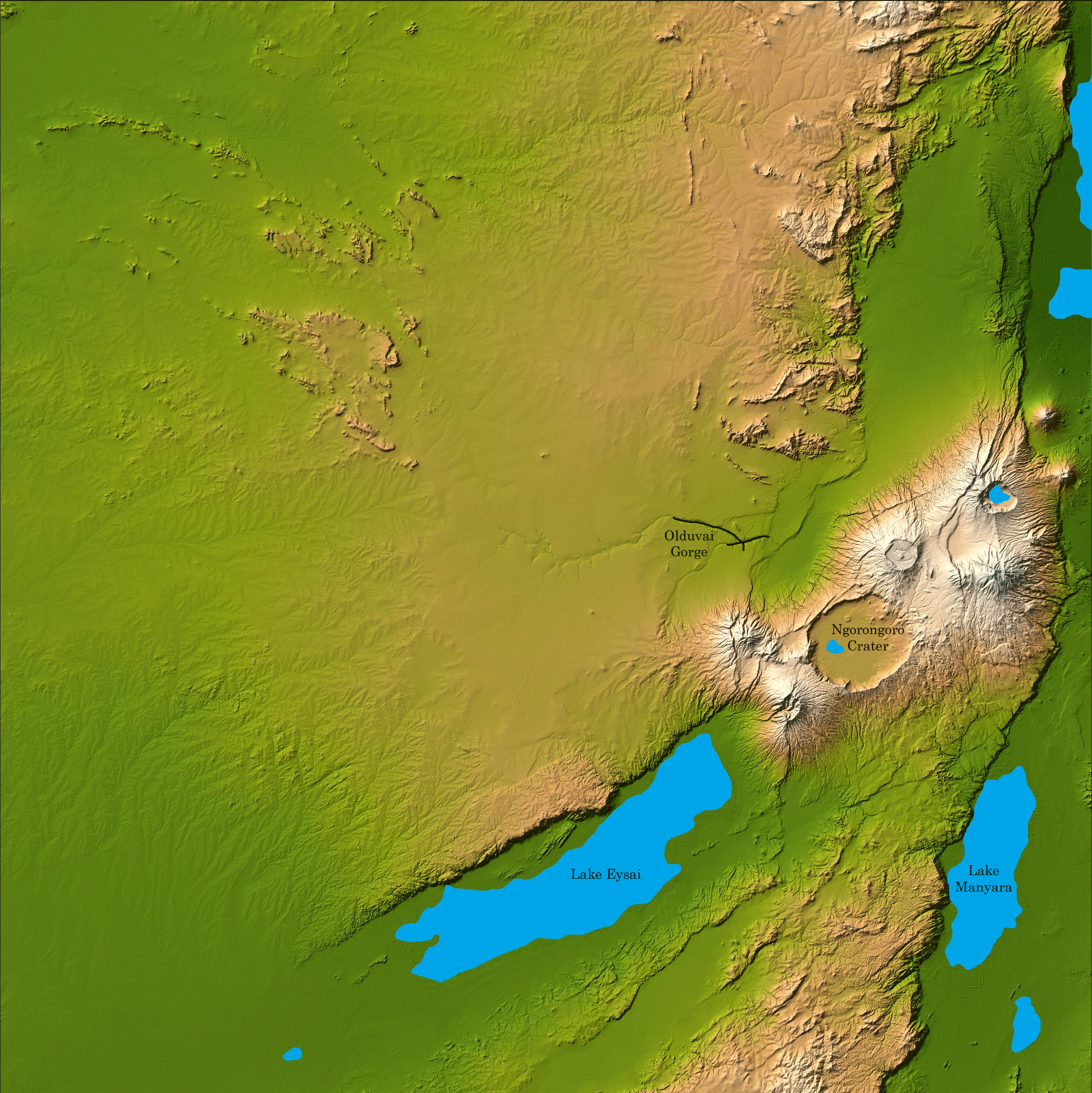
Topography map of the Olduvai Gorge

While travelling in German East Africa in 1911 to investigate sleeping sickness, German physician and paleontologist Wilhelm Kattwinkel visited Olduvai Gorge, mistakenly naming it Oldowan, where he observed many fossil bones of an extinct three-toed horse. Inspired by Kattwinkel's discovery, German geologist Hans Reck led a team to Olduvai in 1913. There, he found hominin remains which were later radiocarbon dated to 17,000 BP. Four more expeditions were planned, but World War I prevented their start. After the war, as Tanganyika came under British control, Louis Leakey visited Reck in Berlin and viewed the Olduvai fossils. Louis Leakey became convinced that Olduvai Gorge held stone tools, thinking the deposits were of similar age to the Kariandusi prehistoric site in Kenya. Reck and the paleontologist Donald McInnes accompanied Louis Leakey in his 1931 expedition, where Louis found a number of hand axes close to camp soon after their arrival. Mary Leakey first visited the area in 1935, joining Louis and Percy Edward Kent. Subsequent visits were made by the Leakeys in 1941, 1953, 1955 and 1957.

Louis and Mary Leakey are responsible for most of the excavations and discoveries of the hominin fossils in Olduvai Gorge. In July 1959, at the FLK site (the initials of the person who discovered it Frida Leakey, and K for korongo, the Swahili language word for gully), Mary Leakey found the skull of Zinjanthropus or Australopithecus boisei. In addition to an abundance of faunal remains the Leakeys found stone tools Mary classified as Oldowan. In May 1960, at the FLK North-North site, the Leakeys' son Jonathan found the mandible that proved to be the type specimen for Homo habilis.

== Archaeology and geology ==
=== Hans Reck and Richard Hay ===
While Hans Reck was the first geologist to attempt to understand the geology of the gorge, current understanding of the geology of the stratigraphic sequence of Olduvai Gorge was made possible in large part by the efforts of geologist Richard Hay. Hay spent twelve years studying the geology at Olduvai, much of it working along with Mary Leakey, finally formulating a detailed picture of the geologic history of the area. Hay's seminal work The Geology of the Olduvai Gorge was published in 1976.

Reck identified five main layers of deposition in the gorge, which were labelled Beds I through V, with Bed I being the oldest and lowest in the sequence. Hay and other geologists working at the gorge since Reck's time have utilized Reck's original Bed outline, adding clarity, detail, and corrections to achieve a more thorough understanding of gorge history. Reck's original Bed IV interval was later distinguished as consisting of Bed IV and the Masek Beds, while Bed V has been reclassified as the Ndutu Bed and the Naisiuiu Bed.

=== Gorge stratigraphy ===
The stratigraphic sequence in the gorge is up to 90 m (300 ft) thick, with a welded tuff, the Naabi ignimbrite, forming the base. This is overlain by a series of lava flows from Olmoti and from another source to the south. The oldest fossils are found on this surface, dated at 1.89 mya, while stone tools have been dated at 1.7 mya through the first use of K-Ar dating by Garniss Curtis. In addition, fission track dating and paleomagnetism were used to date the deposits, while amino acid dating and Carbon-14 dating were used to date the bones. Hominid fossils and stone tools are found continuously throughout the entire exposed sequence in the gorge. Faulting between 100 and 30 kya, formed the Olbalbal Depression northwest of Ngorongoro.

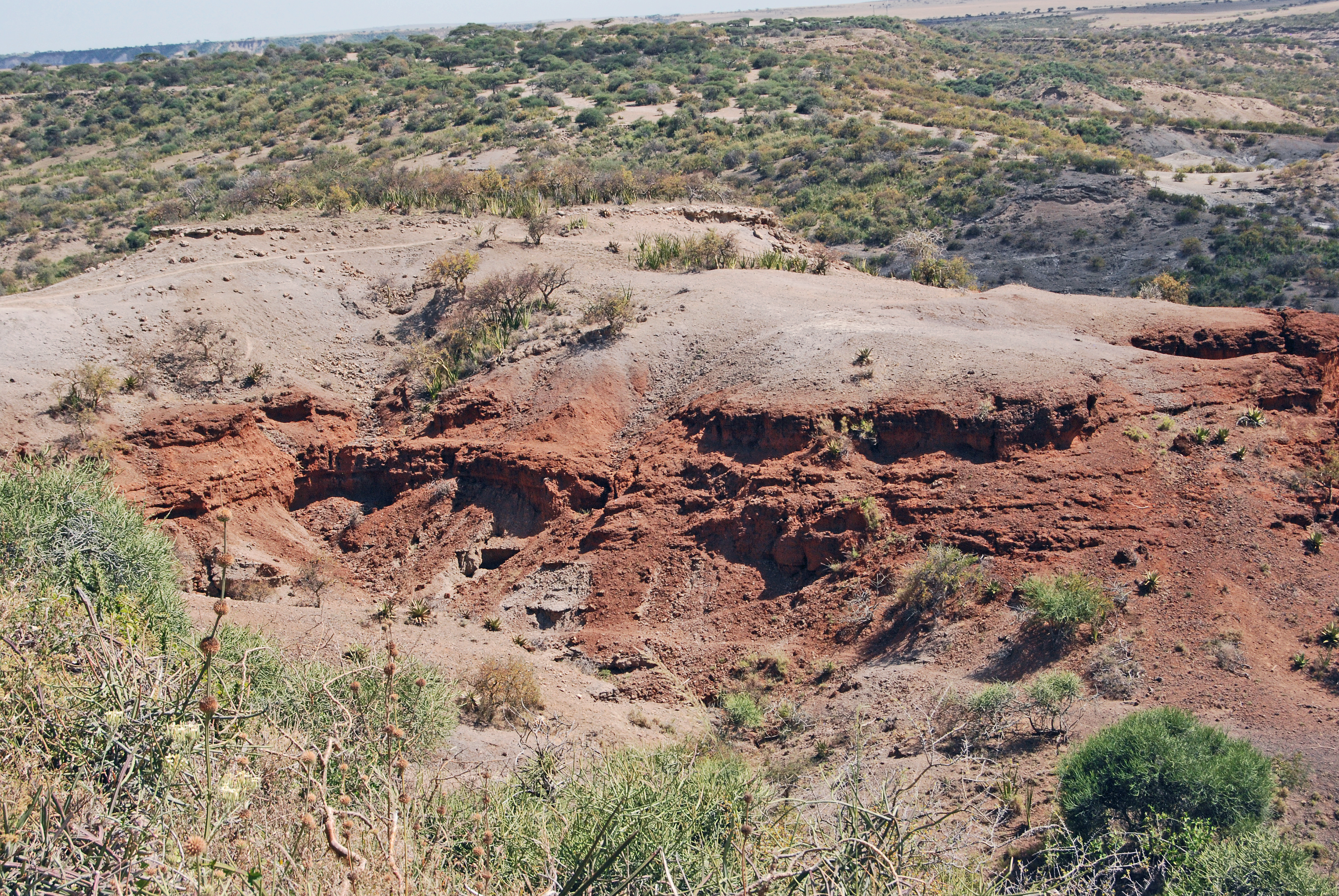
"The Cradle of Mankind" or Oldupai Gorge, is an archaeological trove of fossils in the Arusha Region

==== Bed I ====
The 20–46 m (66–151 ft) thick Lower Pleistocene Bed I sediments overlying the Naabi ignimbrite consist of layers of Olmoti tuff and lake sediment claystone. Four well-preserved living sites of note are located within Bed I, the FLK and FLK North-North sites mentioned above, plus DK and FLK North. The DK site (Donald McInnes' first initial plus k for korongo) has what Leakey considers to be a stone circle, and also many tools and fossil bones ranging in age from 1.75 mya to 1.9 mya.

==== Bed II ====
Bed II consists of 21–35 m (69–115 ft) of clay and sandstone Olduvai Lake and stream deposits. Manuports are abundant at the MNK (Mark Nicol Korongo) site in addition to a chert nodule quarry containing over 14,000 pieces, including gneiss and lava anvils and hammerstones. Hand axes were found at the EF-HR (Evelyn Fuchs-Hans Reck) and TK (Thiongo Korongo) sites. The BK (Bell's Korongo) site contained an Australopithecus boisei deciduous molar and canine.

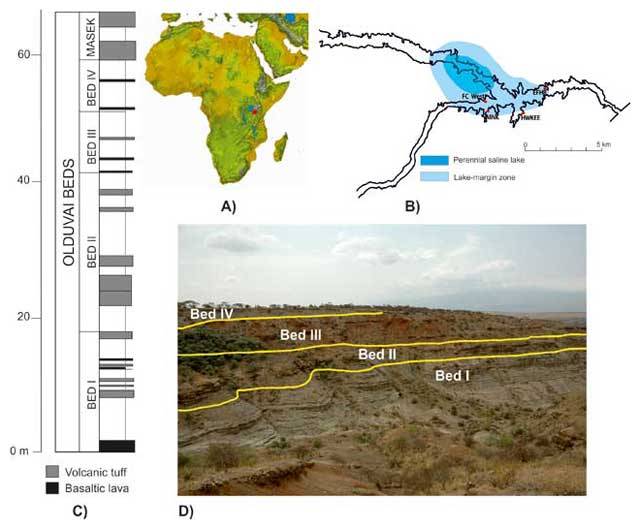
Paleo lake margin in Middle Bed II

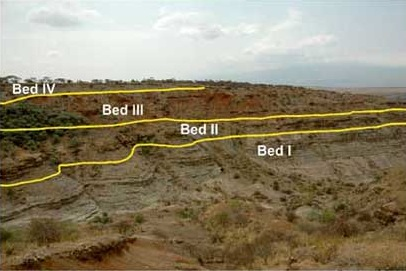
Main sedimentary beds in Oldupai Gorge

==== Bed III ====
The distinctly red Bed III consists of 6–10 m (20–33 ft) of clays, sandstones and conglomerates signifying variable lake depths. Few fossils are present and only isolated stone tools, indicating a sparse early man presence.

==== Bed IV ====
Bed IV is a distinctly different unit from Bed II in the eastern portion of the gorge. There, it is 5–8 m (16–26 ft) thick and composed of clays, and stream deposited sandstones and conglomerates. Four distinct tool-bearing levels are evident, including 500 handaxes and cleavers at the HK (Hopwood's Korongo) site, while phonolite handaxes and an elephant bone handaxe were found at the HEB (Heberer's Gully) site. The WK (Wayland's Korongo) site contained a Homo erectus pelvis and femur.

==== Masek beds ====
The Masek Beds are composed of two episodes of aeolian ash from Kerimasi. A number of quartzite handaxes were found in this layer at the FLK site. Dunes formed after the deposition of Oldonyo Lengai tuffs make up the upper portion of the Ndutu Beds, but yield few fossils. Oldonyo Lengai tuffs also make up the Naisiusiu Beds.

==== Associated fossil species ====
The few Australopithecus boisei remains, which include the skull, a thigh bone fragment, and several teeth, were found distributed throughout Beds I and II, which dates them in the range 1.1 to 2 mya. The more common remains of Homo habilis were found in Bed I and the lower portion of Bed II, which makes them contemporaries of Australopithecus boisei. Homo erectus remains were found in the upper portions of Bed II, making them contemporaries of Australopithecus boisei, but not of Homo habilis.

== The stone tools and their makers ==
Hominin timeline
← / Earlier apes; ← / Gorilla split; ← / Chimpanzee split; ← / Earliest bipedal; ← / Earliest sign of Ardipithecus; ← / Earliest sign of Australopithecus; ← / Earliest stone tools; ← / Earliest sign of Homo; ← / Dispersal beyond Africa; ← / Earliest fire / cooking; ← / Earliest rock art; ← / Earliest clothes; ← / Modern humans
(million years ago)

Louis Leakey first described the Oldowan stone tool industry in 1951. The Leakeys determined that choppers were the most common stone tool found at the gorge, amounting to over half of the total number, and identified 11 Oldowan sites in the gorge, 9 in Bed I, and 2 in Bed II. They also identified the Developed Oldowan as the subsequent diverse tool-kit found in Beds II, III, and IV, with small tools made mostly from chert rather than quartzite. These tools are mostly spheroids and sub-spheroids, followed by choppers.

Besides the chert quarry in Bed II, the Leakeys were able to identify the other source locations of the principal rocks used to make the stone tools. The most common material was quartzite, which originated from the Naibor Soit Inselberg just north of the gorges. The phonolite originated from the Engelosen volcano 5 km to the north. The gneiss came from the Kelogi inselborg 9 km to the southwest.

The first species found by the Leakeys, Zinjanthropus boisei or Australopithecus boisei (renamed and still debated as Paranthropus boisei), featured a sagittal crest and large molars. These attributes suggested the species engaged in heavy chewing, indicating a diet of tough plant material, including tubers, nuts, and seeds—and possibly large quantities of grasses and sedges.

Conversely, the Leakeys' 1960s finds presented different characteristics. The skull lacked a sagittal crest and the braincase was much more rounded, suggesting it was not australopithecine. The larger braincase suggested a larger brain capacity than that of Australopithecus boisei. These important differences indicated a different species, which eventually was named Homo habilis. Its larger brain capacity and decreased teeth size pointed to Homo as the probable toolmaker.

The oldest tools at Olduvai, found at the lowest layer and classified as Oldowan, consist of pebbles chipped on one edge. Above this layer, and later in time, are the true hand-axe industries, the Abbevillian and the Acheulean. Higher still (and later still) are located Levallois artifacts, and finally the Stillbay implements. Oldowan tools in general are called "pebble tools" because the blanks chosen by the stone knapper already resembled, in pebble form, the final product. Mary Leakey classified the Oldowan tools according to usage; she developed Oldowan A, B, and C categories, linking them to Modes 1, 2, and 3 assemblages classified according to mode of manufacture. Her work remains a foundation for assessing local, regional, and continental changes in stone tool-making during the early Pleistocene, and aids in assessing which hominins were responsible for the several changes in stone tool technology over time.

It is not known for sure which hominin species was first to create Oldowan tools. The emergence of tool culture has also been associated with the pre-Homo species Australopithecus garhi, and its flourishing is associated with the early species Homo habilis and Homo ergaster. Beginning 1.7 million years ago, early Homo erectus apparently inherited Oldowan technology and refined it into the Acheulean industry.

Oldowan tools occur in Beds I–IV at Olduvai Gorge. Bed I, dated 1.85 to 1.7 mya, contains Oldowan tools and fossils of Paranthropus boisei and Homo habilis, as does Bed II, 1.7 to 1.2 mya. H. habilis gave way to Homo erectus at about 1.6 mya, but P. boisei persisted. Oldowan tools continue to Bed IV at 800,000 to 600,000 before present (BP). A significant change took place between Beds I and II at about 1.5 mya. Flake size increased, bifacial edges (as opposed to single-face edges) occurred more frequently and their length increased, and signs of battering on other artifacts increased. Some likely implications of these factors, among others, are that after this pivotal time hominins used tools more frequently, became better at making tools, and transported tools more often.

== Hunting and scavenging ==
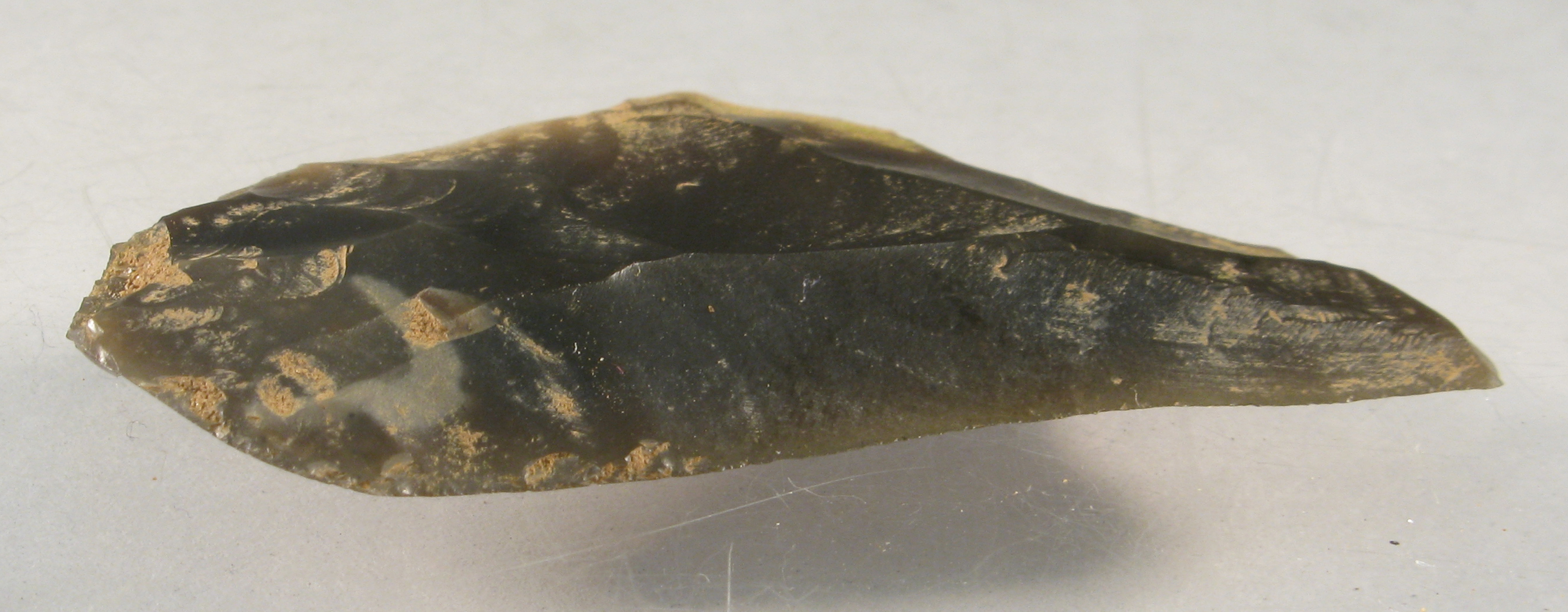
Worked lithic flake

Though substantial evidence of hunting and scavenging has been discovered at Olduvai Gorge, it is believed by archaeologists that hominins inhabiting the area between 1.9 and 1.7 million years ago spent the majority of their time gathering wild plant foods, such as berries, tubers and roots. The earliest hominins most likely did not rely on meat for the bulk of their nutrition. Speculation about the amount of meat in their diets is inferred from comparative studies with a close relative of early hominins: the modern chimpanzee. The chimpanzee's diet in the wild consists of only about five percent as meat. And the diets of modern hunter-gatherers do not include a large amount of meat. That is, most of the calories in both groups' diets came from plant sources. Thus, it can be assumed that early hominins had similar diet proportions, (see the middle-range theory or bridging arguments—bridging arguments are used by archaeologists to explain past behaviors, and they include an underlying assumption of uniformitarianism.)

Much of the information about early hominins comes from tools and debris piles of lithic flakes from such sites as FLK-Zinjanthropus in Olduvai Gorge. Early hominins selected specific types of rocks that would break in a predictable manner when "worked", and carried these rocks from deposits several kilometres away. Archaeologists such as Fiona Marshall fitted rock fragments back together like a puzzle. She states in her article "Life in Olduvai Gorge" that early hominins, "knew the right angle to hit the cobble, or core, in order to successfully produce sharp-edged flakes ...". She noted that selected flakes then were used to cut meat from animal carcasses, and shaped cobbles (called choppers) were used to extract marrow and to chop tough plant material.

Bone fragments of birds, fish, amphibians, and large mammals were found at the FLK-Zinj site, many of which were scarred with marks. These likely were made by hominins breaking open the bones for marrow, using tools to strip the meat, or by carnivores having gnawed the bones. Since several kinds of marks are present together, some archaeologists including Lewis Binford think that hominins scavenged the meat or marrow left over from carnivore kills. Others like Henry Bunn believe the hominins hunted and killed these animals, and carnivores later chewed the bones. This issue is still debated today, but archaeologist Pat Shipman provided evidence that scavenging was probably the more common practice; she published that the majority of carnivore teeth marks came before the cut marks. Another finding by Shipman at FLK-Zinj is that many of the wildebeest bones found there are over-represented by adult and male bones; and this may indicate that hominins were systematically hunting these animals as well as scavenging them. The question of whether hunting or scavenging was more important at Olduvai Gorge is still a controversial one.

Direct evidence of hominins scavenging remains from a big cat in the form of antelope bones that were gnawed on by a felid and then processed by hominins has been found at David's Site from Olduvai Bed 1.

== Hominid fossils found at Olduvai Gorge ==
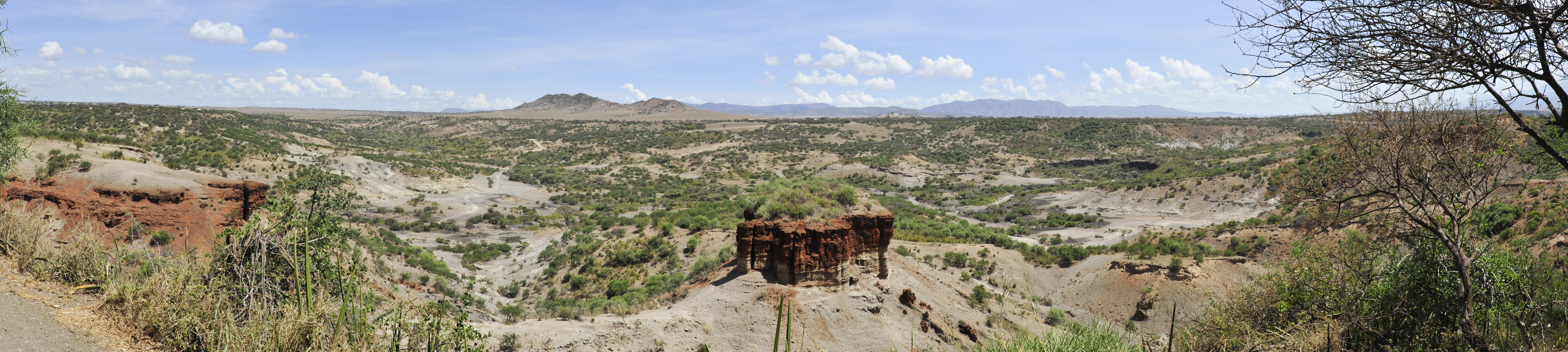
Panoramic view

At least 85 specimens assigned to family Hominidae have been discovered to date. Among these are:

- Olduvai Hominid 5, type specimen of Paranthropus boisei
- Olduvai Hominid 7, type specimen of Homo habilis
- Olduvai Hominid 8, assigned to H. habilis
- Olduvai Hominid 9, assigned to Homo erectus (sensu lato) or Homo ergaster
- Olduvai Hominid 24, assigned to H. habilis
- Olduvai Hominid 62, assigned to H. habilis
- Olduvai Hominin 86, a >1.84 million-year-old proximal phalanx that is the oldest modern human-like (as opposed to australopith/H. habilis-like) hand bone in the fossil record

== Olduvai Gorge monument and museum ==
In July 2019, the Olduvai Gorge Monument was erected at the turnoff to Olduvai Gorge from the road which connects Ngorongoro Conservation Area and Serengeti National Park (a route traveled by safari-goers). Eng. Joshua Mwankunda conceived the idea of erecting a monument to commemorate this significant site while also serving as a signpost and attracting visitors to the Olduvai Gorge and museum; paleoanthropologists Nicholas Toth, Kathy Schick, and Jackson Njau planned and provided life-size fossil casts at the request of the Tanzanian government, which were used by the celebrated Tanzanian artist Festo Kijo to create the two large concrete skulls. The monument consists of two large-scale models of fossil skulls which sit atop a large pedestal with an informative plaque mounted on the side of the pedestal. The fossil skulls depicted are Paranthropus boisei and Homo habilis, two contemporary species which were first discovered at Olduvai Gorge. The large-scale models created by Kijo are each 6 feet tall and weigh 5,000 pounds. The monument project was funded by the Stone Age Institute and the John Templeton Foundation, in partnership with the Ngorongoro Conservation Area Authority (NCAA).

The Olduvai Gorge Museum, located 5 km beyond the monument, is situated on the rim of the gorge at the junction of the main gorge and the side gorge. As one of the largest onsite museums in Africa, the museum provides educational exhibits related to the gorge and its long history.

== IUGS geological heritage site ==
In respect of the presence of 'palaeoanthropological sites indicating early hominin development and activities', the International Union of Geological Sciences (IUGS) included the 'Palaeoanthropological Sites of Human Evolution of Laetoli – Olduvai Gorge' in its assemblage of 100 'geological heritage sites' around the world in a listing published in October 2022. The organisation defines an IUGS Geological Heritage Site as 'a key place with geological elements and/or processes of international scientific relevance, used as a reference, and/or with a substantial contribution to the development of geological sciences through history.'

== Gallery ==
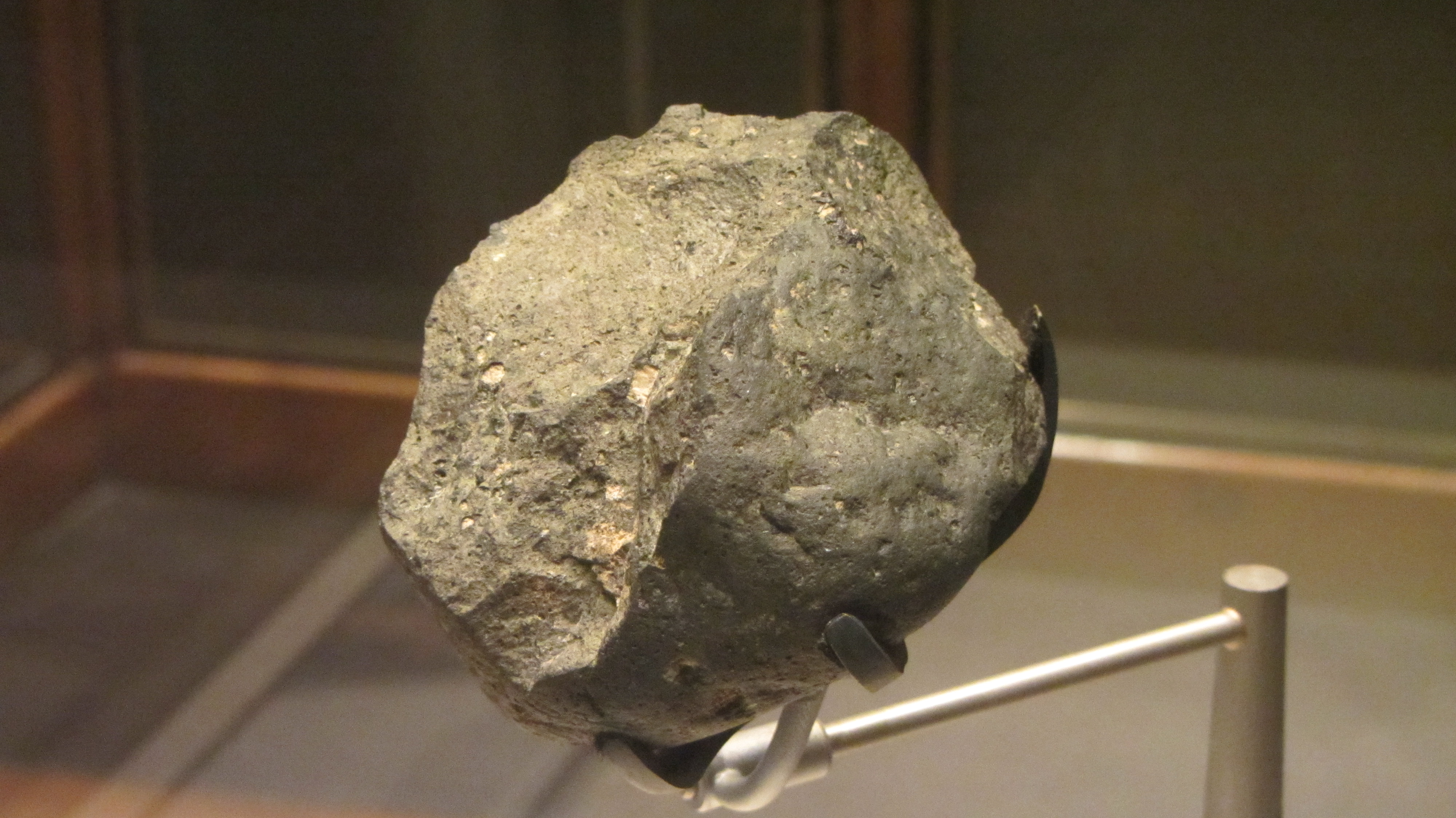
A Oldowan chopper

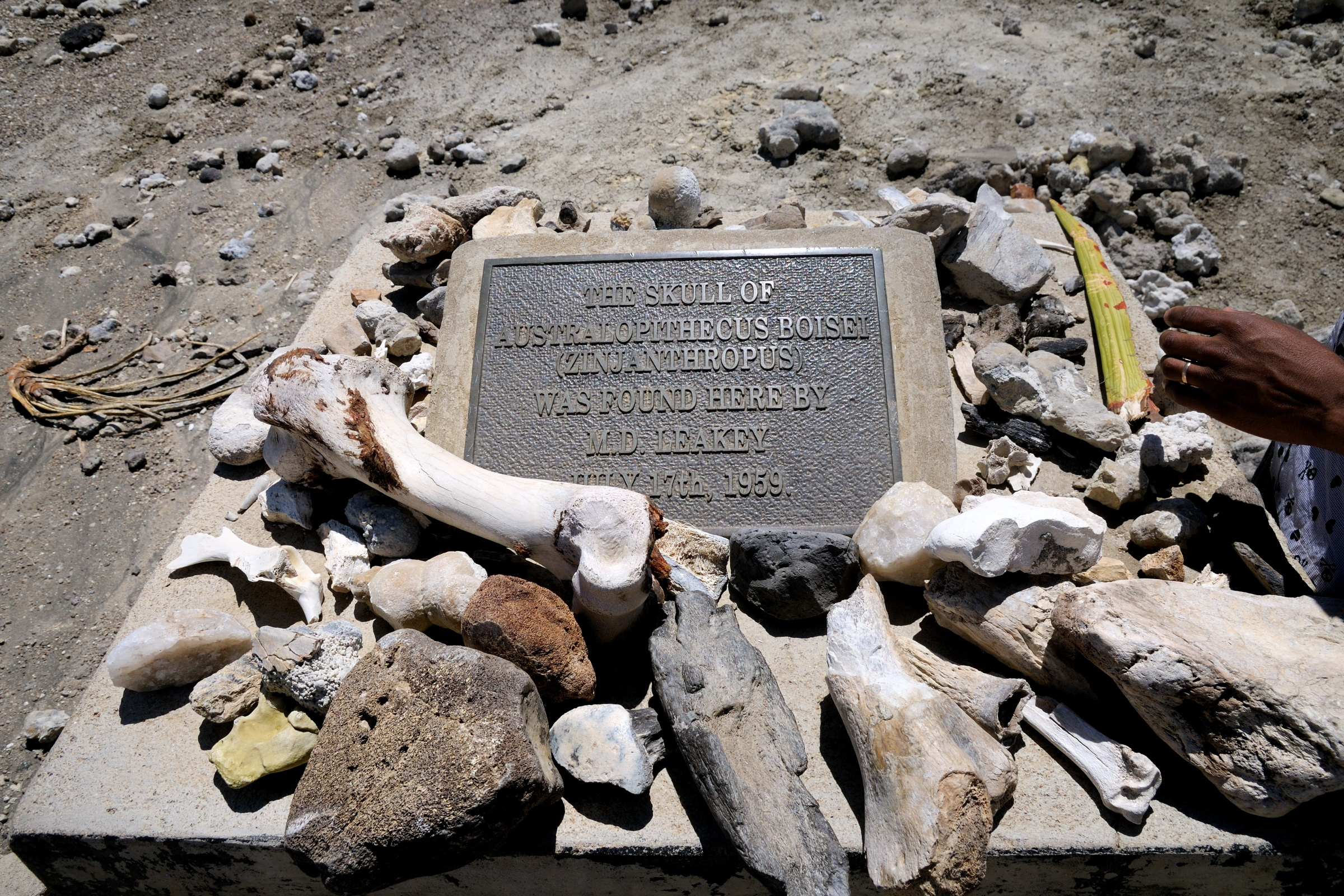
The spot where the first P. boisei was discovered in Tanzania

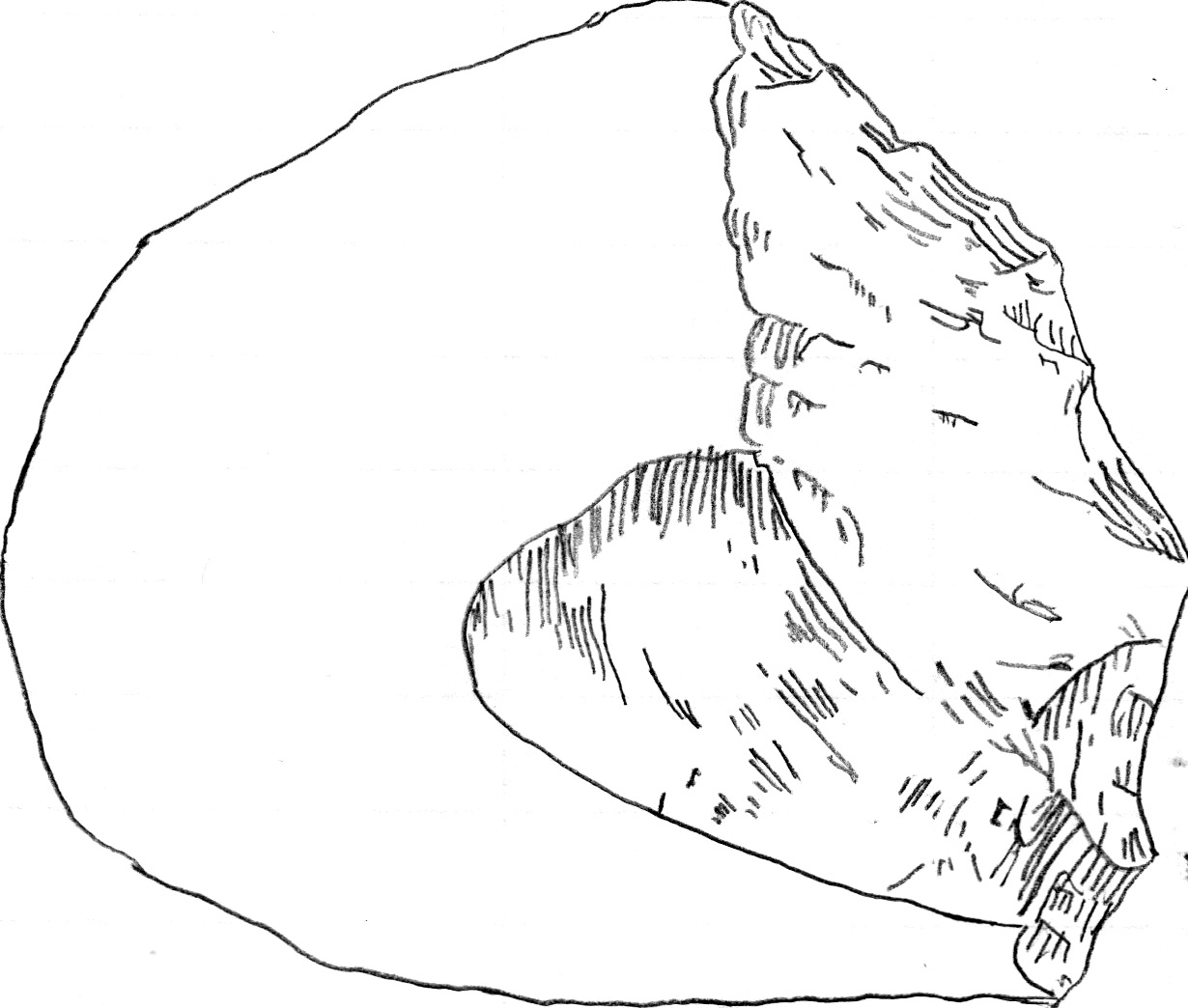
Oldowan stone chopper

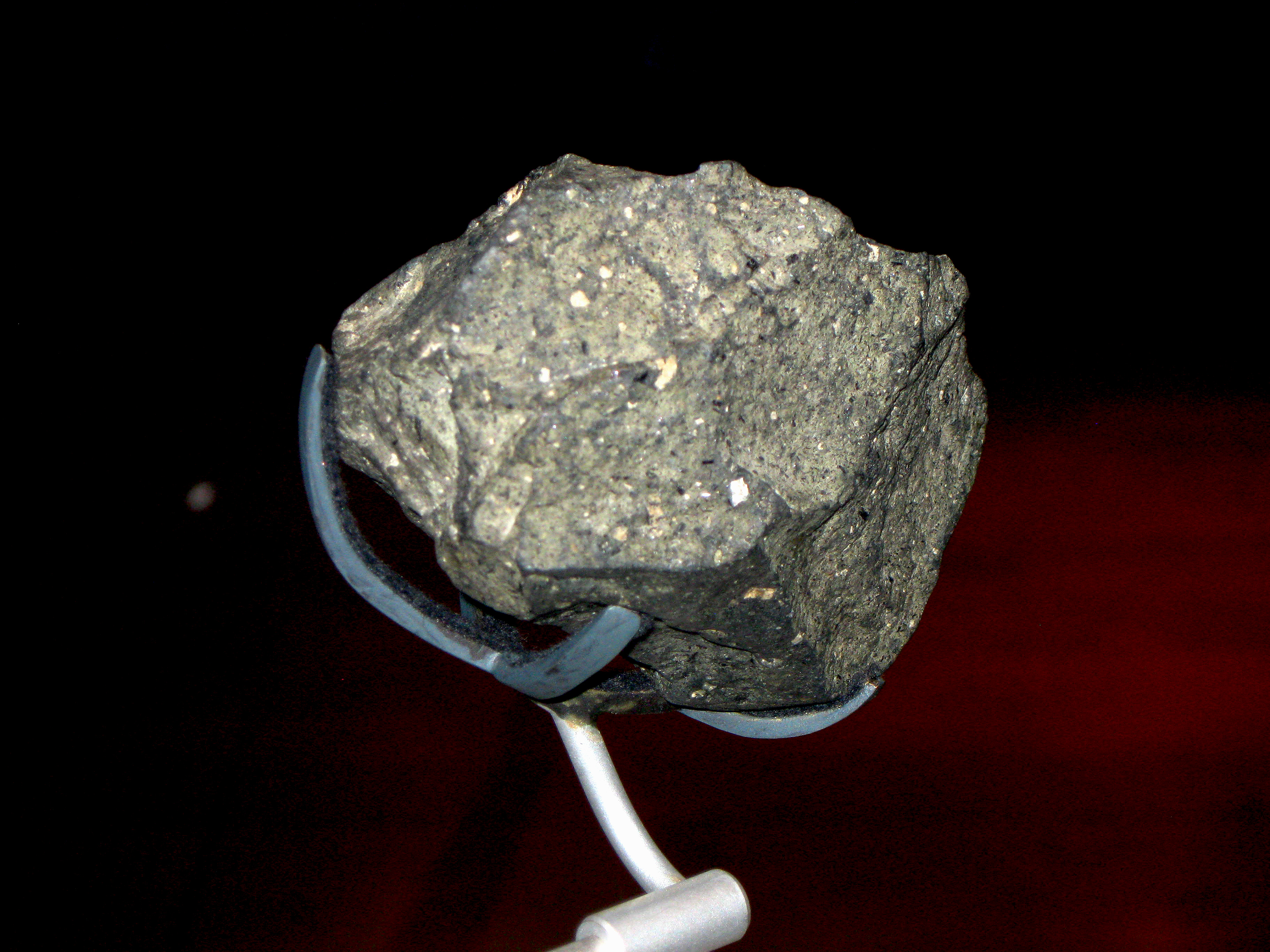
About 1.8 million years old

== See also ==
- Geography of Tanzania
- List of fossil sites
- List of human evolution fossils
- Olorgesailie
- Raymond Dart
- Robert Broom
