= Stone Age Institute =

American independent research center

Coordinates: 39.2929°N 86.5608°W

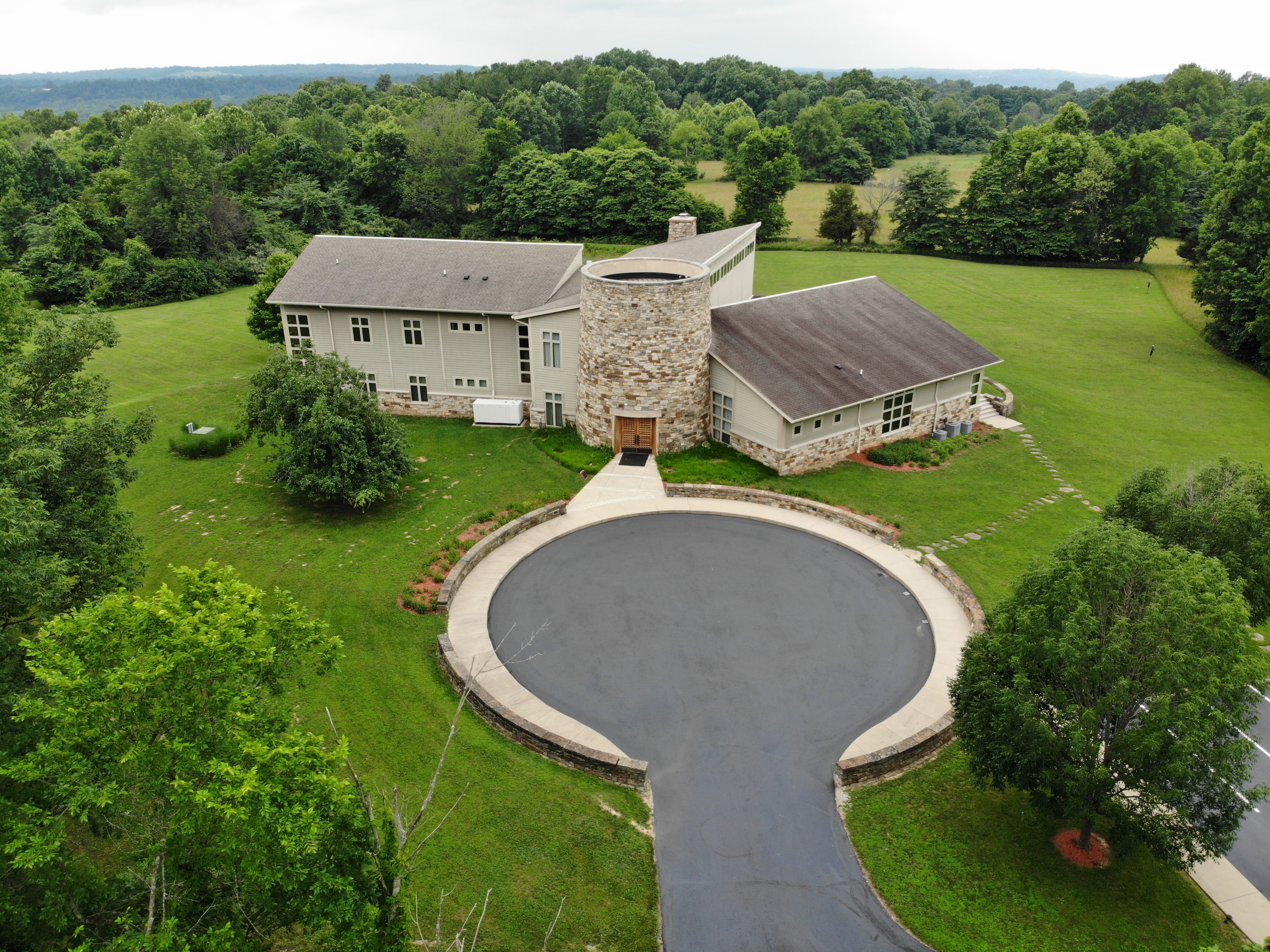
- Company type: Nonprofit organization
- Founded: 2003
- Founder: Nicholas Toth and Kathy Schick
- Headquarters: United States
- Website: stoneageinstitute.org

The Stone Age Institute is an independent research center dedicated to the archaeological and paleontological study of human origins and technological development beginning with the earliest stone tools. The institute was founded by archaeologists Nicholas Toth and Kathy Schick to provide a focal point for research on human origins where affiliated scientists could collaborate on research and to provide science education outreach on human origins and evolution. The Stone Age Institute is a 501(c)(3) nonprofit organization.

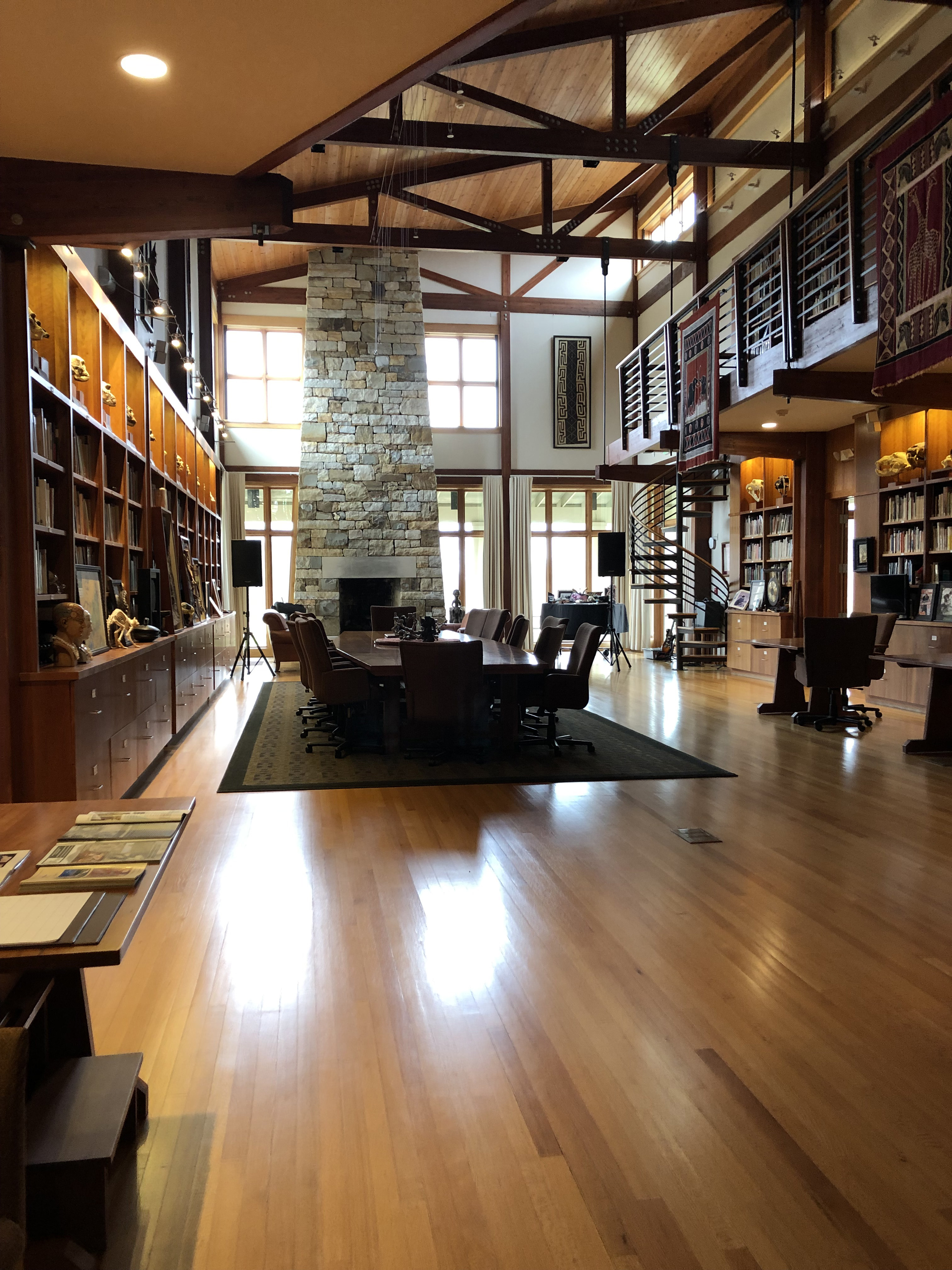
J. Desmond Clark Library at the Stone Age Institute.

The institute publishes scholarly books and articles and offers post-doctoral positions for prospective scientists. The institute is housed in a 11,400-square-foot (1,060 m^{2}) facility located on a 30-acre (120,000 m^{2}) rural site outside Bloomington, Indiana. The building was designed by Mary Krupinski and Dawn Gray of Kirkwood Design Studio in Bloomington, Indiana, and was completed in 2003.

The Stone Age Institute is an autonomous research facility, but it has strong ties with Indiana University, especially CRAFT (the Center for Research into the Anthropological Foundations of Technology) and the Human Evolutionary Studies Program. Its co-founders, Toth and Schick, are faculty members at Indiana University.

The facility includes a research library on early human prehistory and related science donated by the late J. Desmond Clark, professor of Anthropology at the University of California, Berkeley.
