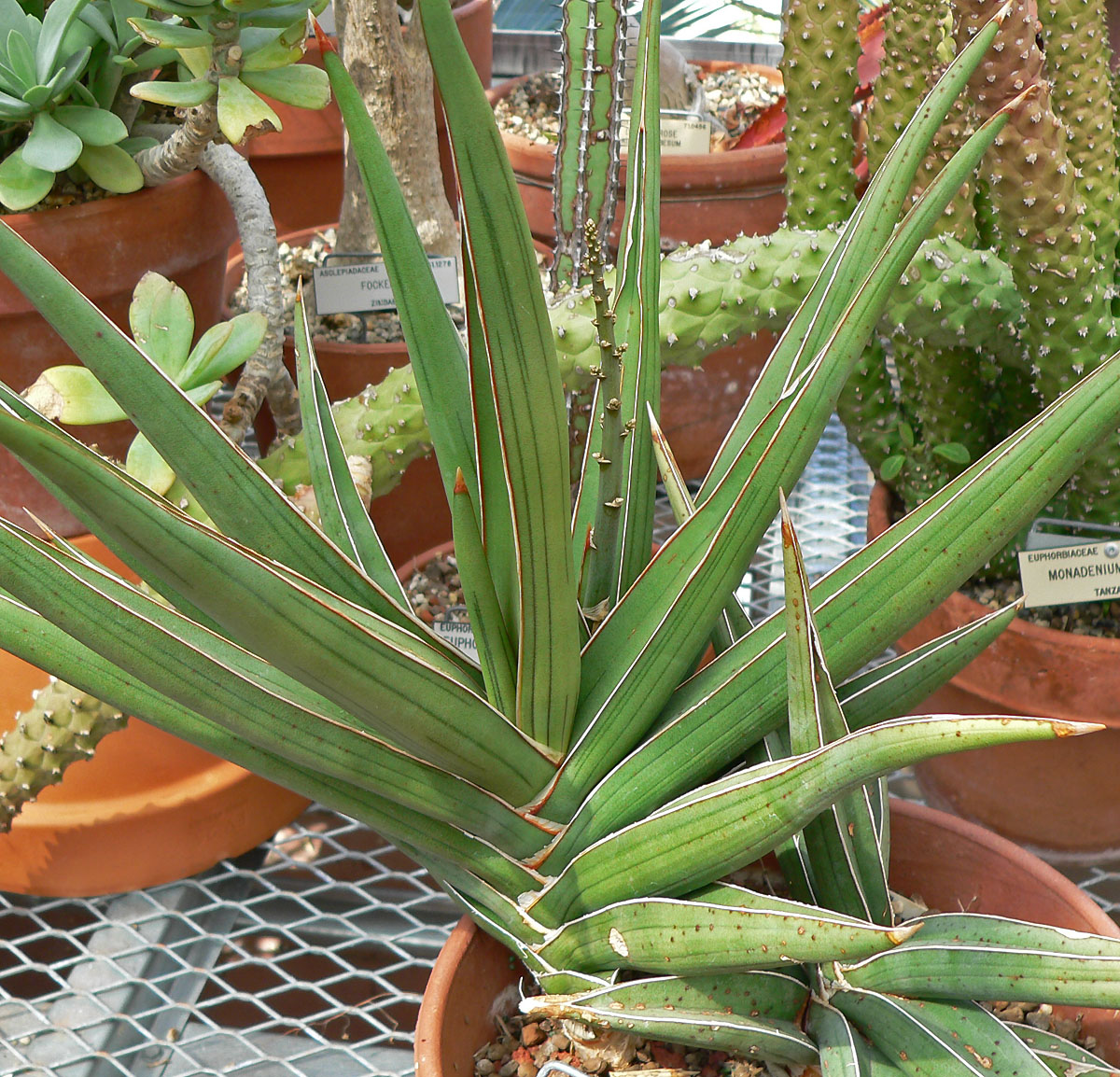

Scientific classification
- Kingdom: Plantae
- Clade: Tracheophytes
- Clade: Angiosperms
- Clade: Monocots
- Order: Asparagales
- Family: Asparagaceae
- Subfamily: Convallarioideae
- Genus: Dracaena
- Species: D. hanningtonii

Binomial name
- Dracaena hanningtonii Baker

Synonyms
- Acyntha ehrenbergii (Schweinf. ex Baker) Kuntze; Acyntha rorida (N.E.Br.) Chiov.; Dracaena oldupai Takaw.-Ny. & Mucina; Pleomele hanningtonii (Baker) N.E.Br.; Sanseverinia rorida Lanza; Sansevieria ehrenbergii Schweinf. ex Baker; Sansevieria rorida (Lanza) N.E.Br.

= Dracaena hanningtonii =

Species of flowering plant

Dracaena hanningtonii, synonym Sansevieria ehrenbergii, (blue sansevieria, sword sansevieria, oldupai, or East African wild sisal) is a flowering plant which grows in northeastern and eastern tropical Africa (Djibouti, Eritrea, Ethiopia, Kenya, Somalia, Sudan and Tanzania) and the Arabian Peninsula (Oman and Saudi Arabia). It occurs notably in proliferation along the Olduvai Gorge in northern Tanzania.

== Description ==
Dracaena hanningtonii bears its leaves in two opposite rows (distichous), forming a sparse fan-shape. It develops a short stem of maximum 18 cm length (unlike stemless species such as D. patens or D. pearsonii).

Mature leaves are rounded in cross-section, though with grooved channel on the inner side, dark green and usually range between 0.5 and 1.5 m in length and 2.45 and 8.0 cm in width.

The plant offsets by rhizomes, eventually forming tight, relatively dense clusters.

== History ==
The epithet ehrenbergii in the synonym Sansevieria ehrenbergii refers to Christian Gottfried Ehrenberg, a naturalist who travelled through Egypt, Nubia, Abyssinia and Arabia in the years 1820–25.

In 1911, the German entomologist Wilhelm Kattwinkel, while searching for butterflies, stumbled into a gorge. He asked the indigenous Maasai people what the gorge was called. They did not understand what he was saying and thought he was referring to the plants of Dracaena hanningtonii, to which they responded oldupaai. Kattwinkel misinterpreted and mispronounced what they were saying by referring to the gorge as "Olduvai Gorge".

== Uses ==
The Maasai have used Dracaena hanningtonii for antiseptics, natural bandages, rope, baskets, roofs and clothes. They were also useful for stitching and sewing as well as patching and repairing leatherwork. To make the rope, the leaves were cut, then taken and left to soak in water until the outer layer had split and rotted down which would allow it to be easily separated from the fibrous matter inside. They were then removed from the water and taken to a hard flat surface to be beaten with heavy clubs until the fibres were loosened. The fibrous material was then extracted, separated into strands and worked into cordage of various thicknesses. Fibres from the D. hanningtonii were short but very strong threads which were popular when making slingshots

During the 1970s, paleoanthropologist Bill Montagne was working in Olduvai Gorge and became injured. He received treatment in the form of a natural bandage made from D. hanningtonii, after which he was so impressed, he began pharmaceutical research.

Dracaena hanningtonii was also traditionally used to treat circular weeping sores with the juice squeezed out from a snapped off leaf. In years of drought, this plant was also vital in sustaining cattle until the next rains.

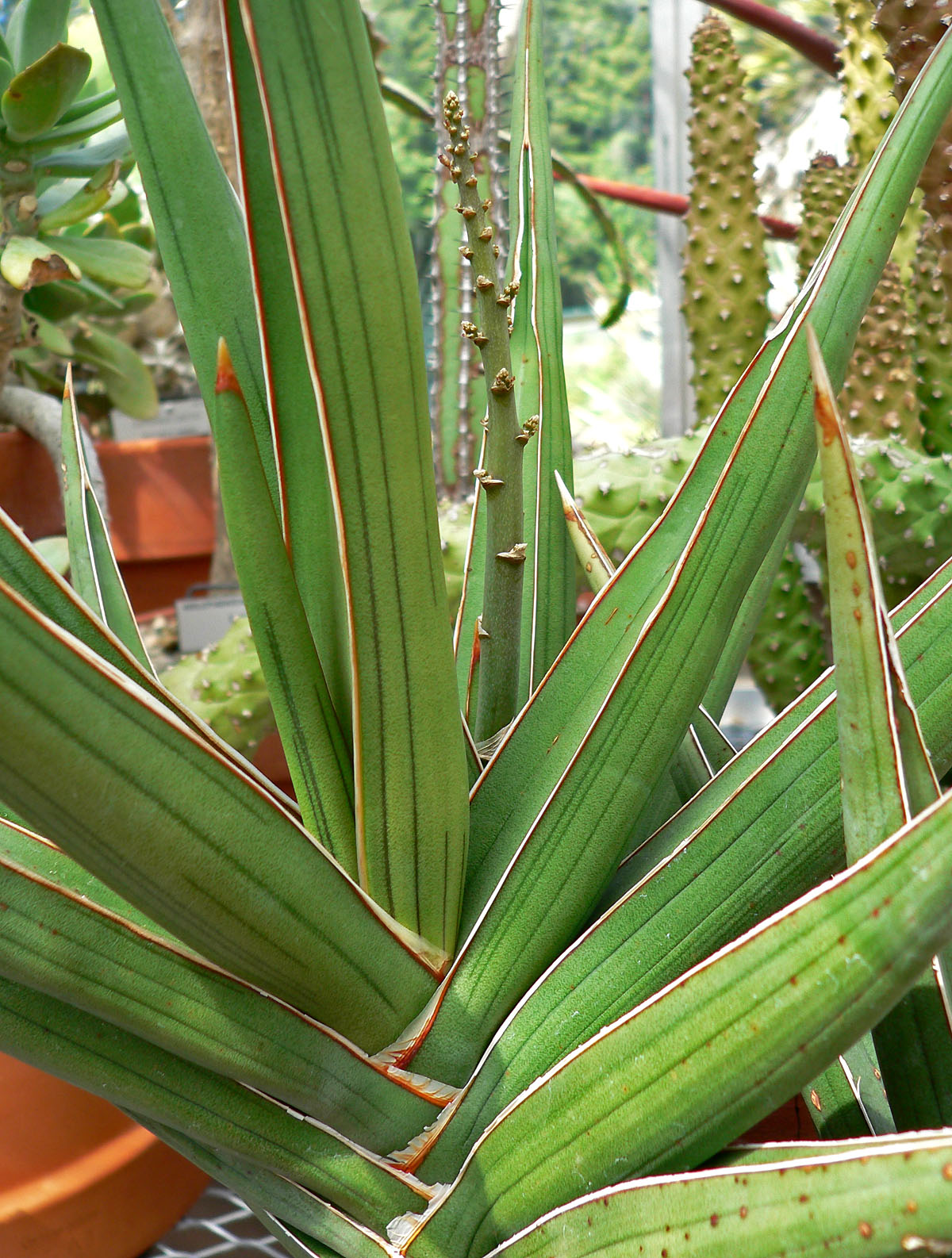
D. hanningtonii has a short stem with leaves in two opposite rows. Leaves are rounded but with channels on the inside.

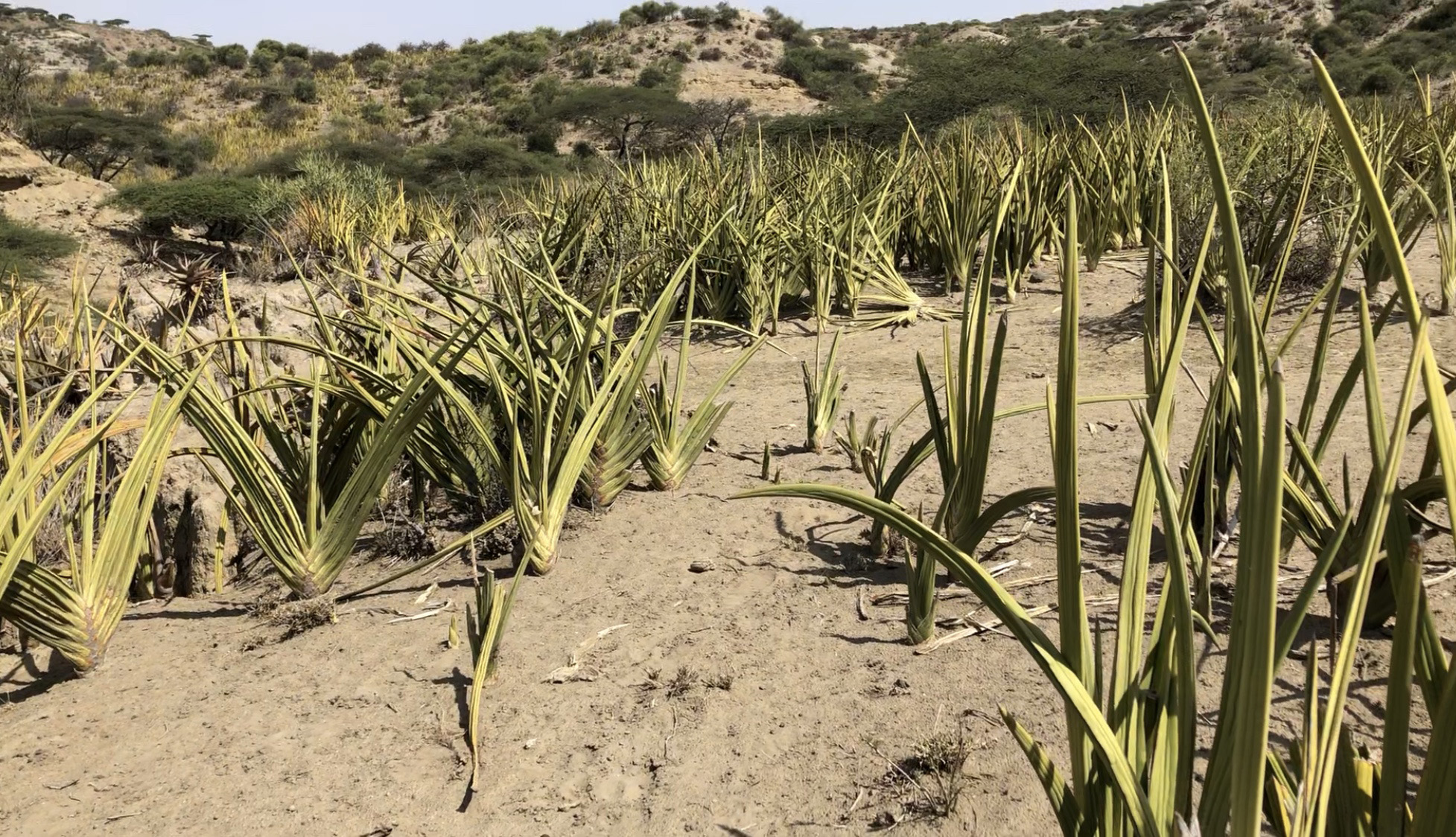
Clusters grow in abundance throughout Olduvai Gorge in Northern Tanzania.

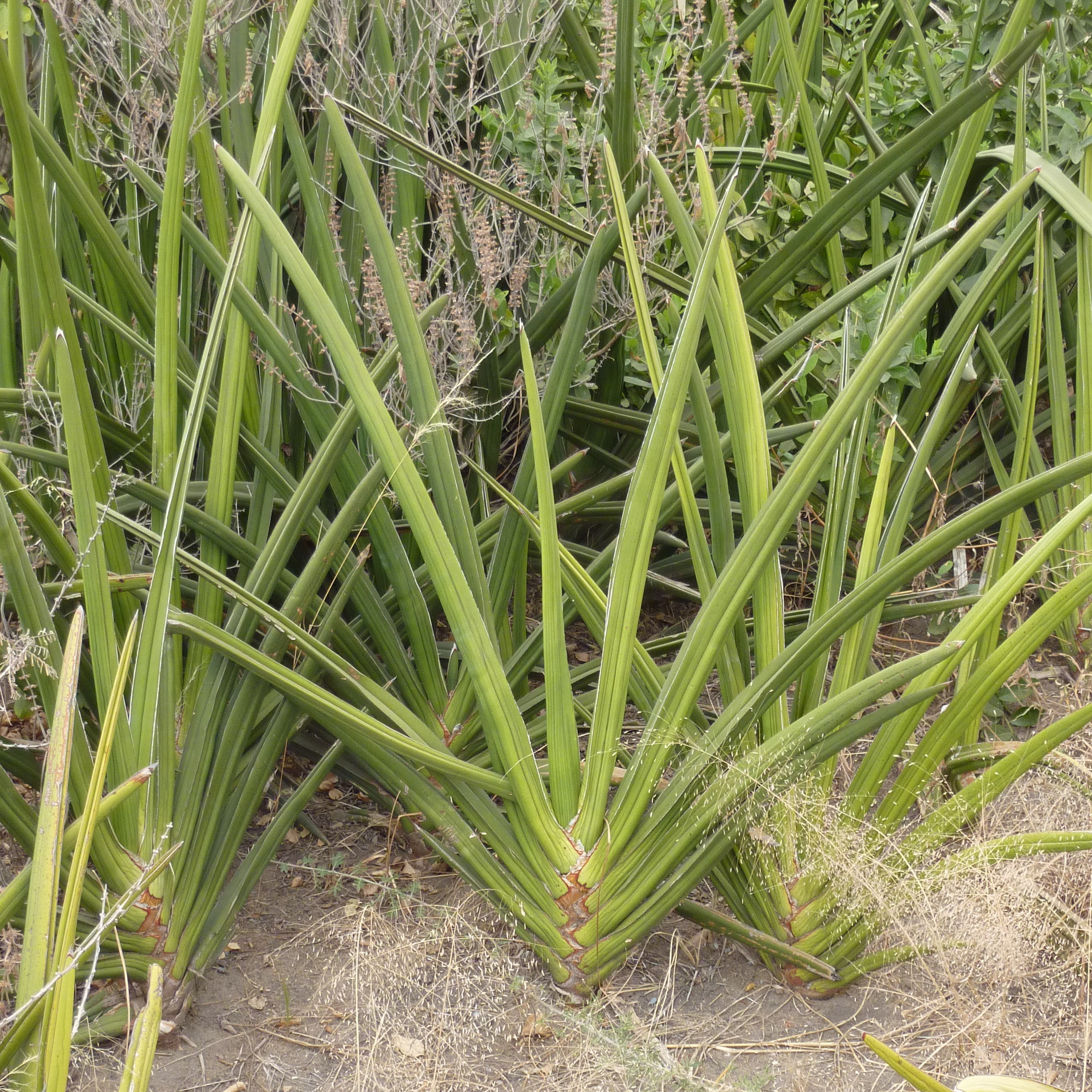
Mature plants

== See also ==
- Sisal
