= Olduvai Hominid 8 =

Fossilized hominid

OH 8
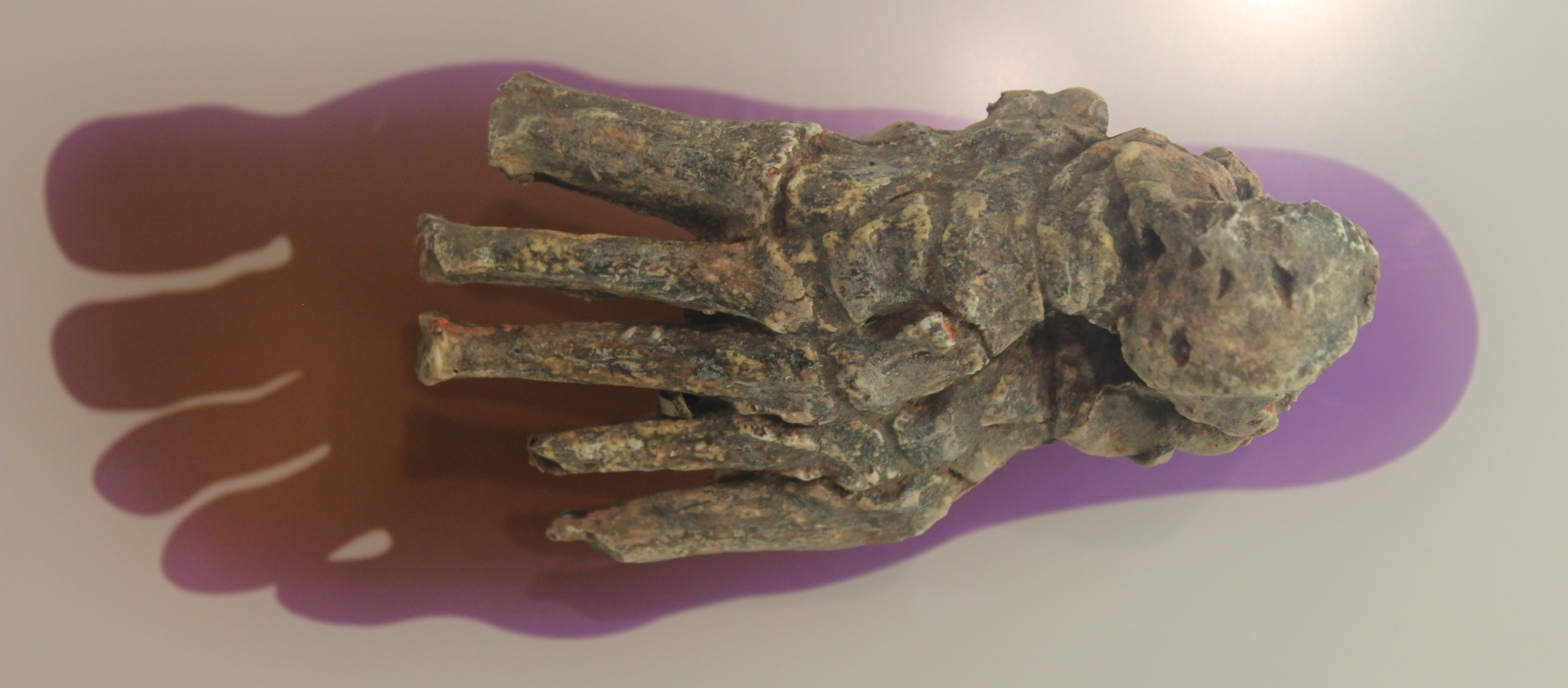
- Casts of OH 8, National Museum of Natural History
- Catalog no.: OH 8
- Species: Homo habilis
- Age: 1.8 mya
- Place discovered: Olduvai Gorge, Tanzania
- Date discovered: 1960
- Discovered by: A team led by Louis S. B. Leakey

Olduvai Hominid number 8 (OH 8) is a fossilized foot of an early hominin found in Olduvai Gorge by Louis Leakey in the early 1960s.

== Remnants ==
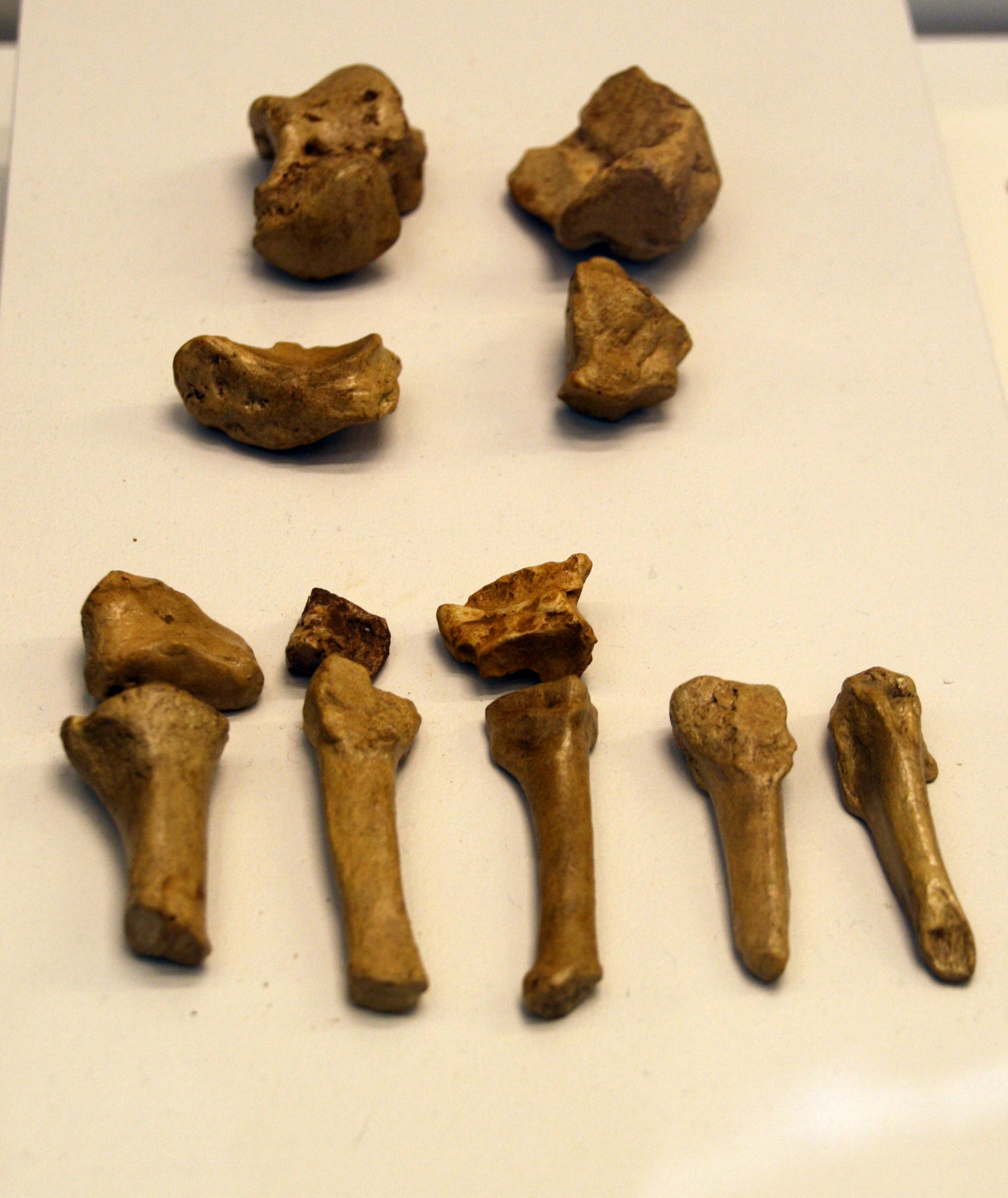
Pieces of OH 8

Kidd et al. (1996) argued that the fossil assemblage exhibits both ape and human characteristics. The lateral side (i.e. the outside of the foot) contains human-like characteristics while the medial side (i.e. the side towards the midline) contains ape-like features proximally, and human-like features distally. Specifically, the cuboid (laterally) is human-like, the talus and navicular (medially) are ape-like, and the medial cuneiform (medially), is human-like. This may be looked upon as a missing link in terms of mid-tarsal joint function. Later fossil finds, as exemplified by the so-called "Little Foot" (Stw573 complement this finding (Kidd & Oxnard 2004).

Stw573 is a medial column assemblage, consisting of a talus, navicular, medial cuneiform and a first metatarsal stub. The three hindfoot bones present a pattern consistent with those of the OH 8 assemblage. Thus the hypothesis of a divergent first ray in the OH 8 assemblage, proposed in Kidd et al. (1996), is now refuted, and neither fossil assemblage are thought to have this characteristic.

Zipfel and Kidd (2006) suggest an integrative model of pedal evolution of caudo-cranial, disto-proximal changes. and Zipfel, DeSilva and Kidd (2009), Zipfel et al. (2011) with regard to then-recently found skeletal remains of Australopithecus sediba further argue that the disto-proximal issues of the medial column may also present in the lateral column. Combined, these findings refute the "Hypothetical Prehuman Foot", as predicted by Morton (1935); Morton had predicted an "atavistic" divergent first ray, and a very substantial, robust calcaneus; neither of these predictions are evident from the fossil record as currently available..
