= Broken Hill (disambiguation) =

Broken Hill is a city in western New South Wales, Australia.

Broken Hill may also refer to:

- City of Broken Hill, the local government area containing the Australian city
- Broken Hill ore deposit
- Broken Hill mine
- Broken Hill (film), a 2010 American film
- Kabwe, a city in Zambia formerly known as Broken Hill
- Kabwe mine in Zambia formerly called Broken Hill mine.
- Kabwe 1 or the "Broken Hill skull", the type specimen for Homo rhodesiensis, an extinct human species discovered in and named for the place in Zambia.
- Electoral district of Broken Hill, has twice been the name of an electoral district for the New South Wales Legislative Assembly
- Broken Hill Hospital serves the city and district
- Broken Hill railway station
