= Kalambo Falls =

Waterfalls on the Tanzania and Zambia border

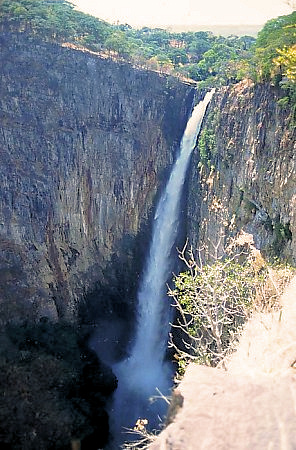

- Kalambo Falls Kalambo Falls (Tanzania)
- 8.5974°S 31.2396°E
- Location: Zambia and Rukwa Region, Tanzania

The Kalambo Falls on the Kalambo River is a 235-metre (772 ft) single-drop waterfall on the border of Zambia and Rukwa Region, Tanzania at the southeast end of Lake Tanganyika. The falls are some of the tallest uninterrupted falls in Africa (after South Africa's Tugela Falls, Ethiopia's Jin Bahir Falls and others). Downstream of the falls is the Kalambo Gorge, which has a width of about 1 km and a depth of up to 300 m, running for about 5 km before opening out into the Lake Tanganyika rift valley. The Kalambo waterfall is the tallest waterfall in both Tanzania and Zambia. The expedition which mapped the falls and the area around it was in 1928 and led by Enid Gordon-Gallien. Initially it was assumed that the height of falls exceeded 300 m, but measurements in the 1920s gave a more modest result, above 200 m. Later measurements, in 1956, gave a result of 221 m. After this several more measurements have been made, each with slightly different results. The width of the falls is 3.6–18 m.

Kalambo Falls is also considered one of the most important archaeological sites in Africa, with occupation spanning over 447,000 years. In 2023, archaeologists announced the discovery of wooden structures estimated to be 476,000 years old at the falls, predating Homo sapiens. Two worked wooden beams display evidence that burning was used to create an interlocking wooden structure, possibly a platform by what would have then been a water source for the early hominid residents. This is the earliest known hominid structure.

== Archaeology ==
Archaeologically, Kalambo Falls is one of the most important sites in Africa. It has produced a sequence of past human activity stretching over more than two hundred and fifty thousand years, with evidence of continuous habitation since the Late Early Stone Age until modern times. It was first excavated in 1953 by John Desmond (J.D.) Clark who recognized archaeological activity around a small basin lake upstream of the falls. Excavations in 1953, 1956, 1959, and 1963 allowed Clark to make conclusions about the multiple different cultures inhabiting the area over thousands of years of time.

== Pleistocene environmental reconstruction ==
J.D. Clark's work incorporated both questions of the cultures who lived at the Kalambo Falls site as well as what their environment was like during times of occupation. Using plant (floral) and pollen analyses, Clark was able to conduct the process of paleoenvironmental reconstruction. By studying pollen that settled on the earth during different environmental settings, Clark was able to form a general idea of what ecological factors affected the Kalambo Falls region at different times. In order to do this, Clark used a tool for drawing out sediment cores in order to observe and analyse the different layers below the surface of the earth today. He separated these layers into 6 different spectra, labeled zones U through Z. The law of superposition is important to note when discussing sedimentary layers; this law states that more recent layers of soil dispersal will overlie older ones.

Zone U The bottom of Clark's core sample is the oldest layer. Pollen samples collected indicate that swamp vegetation and an abundance of grass grew on the Kalambo River. The tests also indicated that the surrounding woodland grew during dry and hot climates. Clark concludes that the ground-water levels must have been high in order for a swamp and fringing, or riparian forest, to grow along the water's edge during a period of reduced rainfall.

Zone V Pollen collected from the next zone indicate an identical environment with the swamp and woodland vegetation that was not affected by climate conditions, such as the drop of 3° Celsius (C) in the area.

Zone W Pollen of plants that grow in more open areas with more rainfall were taken from Zone W. This indicates an increase in rainfall to about 75–100 cm and a woodland with an open canopy to allow that rainfall to reach the ground below.

Zone X Clark indicates that the study of this zone was only on one sample drawn from the soil below, so the conclusions are not finite in his study. Plants indicated show a fringing forest that was poorly developed with a very open woodland. Within these woodland conditions, there seems to be an influence of evergreen elements that emerged.

Zone Y Clark was able to date this zone to approximately 27,000 to 30,000 years ago, because conditions were comparable to those dated in European soils from this time. Evidence of an increase in rainfall and a temperature drop of 4.1 °C with a fringing forest that was well developed with the return of swamp plants is indicated in the pollen collected.

Zone Z The final zone indicates a much poorer fringing forest and a reduced shift of vegetation growth at the time.

== Culture history of the site ==
=== Early Stone Age ===
The Early Stone Age is described by Barham and Mitchell as the time period where the ancient ancestors of Homo sapiens sapiens first emerged, branching from the Australopithecus afarensis, evolving into Homo habilis and then Homo erectus 2.6 million years ago to 280,000 years ago. Archaeologists hypothesize that the technological progression over time can be examined in the morphological characteristics of tools that are associated with different eras of habitation. The earliest identified stone tools, made by Homo habilis are known as Oldowan tools, and they consist of the basic large pounding stones and small pebble flakes, known as Mode 1 technology. As time progressed and Homo habilis evolved into Homo erectus, so did the technology as more specialized stone tools were being developed, even tools that were used for making other tools, Mode 2 and 3 technologies.

These Late Acheulean stone tools, along with hearths and well-preserved organic objects were found at Kalambo Falls and documented by JD Clark. These organic artifacts collected included a wooden club and digging sticks as well as the dietary evidence for fruit consumption. Tools excavated from Kalambo Gorge have been analyzed and OSL dating of quartzite within the soil context to between 500,000 and 50,000 years ago, and some contexts dated to 100,000 years ago with amino acid dating.

In 2023, archaeologists announced the discovery of wooden structures and other wooden artifacts, which were determined to be at least 476,000 years old using luminescence dating. The discovery predates Homo sapiens, so the tools may have potentially been made by Homo heidelbergensis, of which a 300,000 year old skull was found at another Zambian site. The discovery was considered unusual because wood does not usually survive for so long. Archaeologists such as Larry Barham of the University of Liverpool, one of the discoverers of the wooden structures, believes that wooden tools were potentially even more common than stone tools in the Stone Age, but due to wood decaying quickly in the ground archaeologists could not find such tools.

=== Middle Stone Age ===
The Middle Stone Age, dated at 280,000 years ago to roughly 40,000 years ago, is the period where the final stages of hominid evolution brought what is known today as "modern human behavior".

During this time, the Acheulean industry of Kalambo Falls was superseded by the Sangoan culture. This shift is considered by Clark as a result of an ecological shift to a cooler and wetter climate. It is at this time in the archaeological record that the large, Acheulean handaxe disappears and is replaced by the core axe and chopping tools characteristic of Sangoan technologies. Heavy woodworking tools and small, notched and denticulated tools, collected by Clark, were dated to have been made before 41,000 BC. This rapid change is predicted to be a result of population movement during this time period, as the "Acheulean man" who lived in open settlements were replaced by a culture associated with Homo rhodesiensis found at Kabwe mine, the Sangoan culture. Evidence of Sangoan habitation has been collected from less open Rock Shelters and Cave areas, possibly due to the persisting, wetter climate.

Evidence of fire technologies, such as hearths, charred logs, reddened clay, and stone heat spalls were also collected and found in association with charcoal remains. Radiocarbon dates of the scattered charcoal indicate people were using fire systematically there some 60,000 years ago.

The cool, wet climates of the region were similar to that of the Congo, and similar cultural practices have been identified at Kalambo Falls, known as Lupemban industries. Evidence suggests that the Sangoan tradition was replaced by the Lupemban industry around 250,000 years ago and continued through to 117,000 years ago. It is characterized by two-sided, or bifacial, stone tools like core axes and double-ended points that were possibly for hafting as spearheads. Geological studies by J.D. Clark indicate that the frequency of these tools is possibly due to factors that exemplified the amount of large pieces of breakable, or knappable, raw materials.

=== Later Stone Age ===
The Later Stone Age is the final age of the Paleolithic Era of Africa, and generally refers to more recent hunter/gatherer sites. Around 10,000 years ago Kalambo Falls was occupied by the Magosian culture which in turn gave way to Wilton activity.

=== Iron Age and the Luangwa tradition ===
Around the fourth century AD, a more industrialized Bantu-speaking people began to farm and occupy the area. These Bantu-speaking people made ceramic vessels that have characteristics of East African pottery, which suggests a population movement from the Rift Valley. Burials from this period are characterized by Clark as shaft grave burials, which are similar to those of the earlier cultures of the East African Rift as opposed to the Kalambo region.

The Iron Age in Zambia is split into an earlier, regionally categorized period and a later period of materialistically differing traditions. Early assemblages of iron tools and pottery have been collected from the Kalambo Falls and are categorized as being from the Kalambo Group tradition. At Kalambo falls, Early Iron Age traditions are believed to have continued into the 11th century.

In 1971, Robert C. Soper studied different assemblages of Iron Age pottery in eastern and southern Africa and consolidated them into two major groups, known as Urewe and Kwale wares. He indicated that Kalambo and Mwabulambo pot traditions may also be included in these. David W. Phillipson used these conclusions to form a north to south chronology of artifacts and comprised many of the groups studied by Soper into one, Mwitu tradition. This tradition is exhibited by pots that range from the first millennium AD.

The Kalambo group was replaced by the Luangwa tradition, whose pottery is similar to the Early Iron Age Chondwe Group of the Central African Copperbelt. Luangwa Pottery is characteristic of necked pots and shallow bowls, with the most common comb-stamped decoration pressed in a horizontal pattern of delineated lines. There has yet to be found any evidence for an interface between this Luangwa tradition and the Early Iron Age tradition at Kalambo Falls, whereas sites at the Eastern Province of Zambia exhibit this interrelationship. Exact dates for this transition in the Kalambo area are inconclusive, but the tradition has continued through to the present.

== Chronology of the site ==
Attempts to date artifacts from Kalambo Falls have resulted in inconsistent results, ranging from 110,000 years ago with racemization to 182,000 ±10,000 to 76,000 ±10,000 years ago with applied uranium series dating. These studies underscore the difficulty in establishing a chronology for human habitation at the falls, which has led some archaeologists to disregard its significance in the African archaeological record.

However, optically stimulated luminescence (OSL) on quartz artifacts has recently improved understanding of the site's chronology. OSL works by sending signals through a crystalline material and collects data on how long ago the stone was exposed to light or heat.

OSL results have led to the creation of a new chronology for the site, broken into six stages. Stage 1 ranges between approximately 500,000 to 300,000 years ago. Stage 2 ranges from 300,000 to 50,000 years ago. Stage 3 dates range from 50,000 to 30,000 years ago. Stage 4 deposits date to 1,500 to 500 years ago and Stage 5 follows after 490 years ago.

Acheulean stone tools (Mode 2 and 3 technologies) were collected from stratigraphic layers corresponding to the first and second stages. More complex Mode 3 tools came from the first three stages and are also found in Stage 4, whose corresponding layers contain a mix of Stone and Iron Age artifacts.

== Zambia and UNESCO significance ==
In 1964, the archaeological site was gazetted as a national monument by Zambia's National Heritage Conservation Commission. It has since been protected under Zambia's 1989 National Heritage Conservation Act. In 2009, Kalambo Falls was included on UNESCO list of tentative World Heritage Sites. Justifications for the inclusion are that the Kalambo Falls are the 2nd highest waterfalls in Africa, the evidence of one of the longest examples of human occupation in sub-Saharan Africa, and the collected stone tools are from one of the world's earliest tool industries, the Acheulean. As of 2016, Kalambo Falls remains on the tentative list for recognition as a protected World Heritage site.

In February 2025, Rose Ngunangwa, executive director of Tanzania Media for Community Development stated that including Kalambo Falls among UNESCO Cultural Heritage sites will help in the economy and recognition of the area stating: "Kalambo Falls also deserves to be among the wonders of the world due to its uniqueness and the forest conservation which surrounds the area and the history behind it. The Ministry of Natural Resources and Tourism should invite investors to build good hotels and shops in the area where tourists who come will be able to sleep and get all the basic needs."

== Contemporary ecology ==
Today, both human and animal populations traverse the Kalambo Falls area, which has a basin above the falls that attracts many of both populations as an important stopping place. On the Zambian border, the area is now a game preserve for the protection of many animals. The falls' cliff-face ledges provide nesting places and breeding sites for a marabou stork colony.

== See also ==
- List of waterfalls
