= J. Desmond Clark =

English archaeologist

J. Desmond Clark CBE FSA
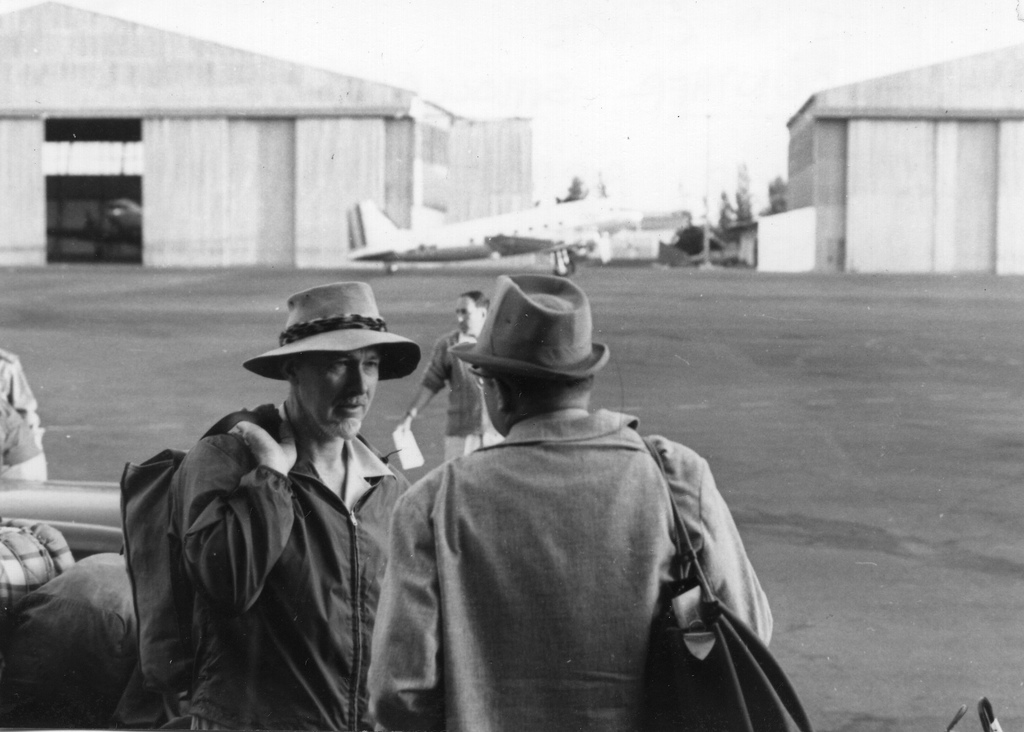
- J. Desmond Clark (left)
- Born: 10 April 1916; London, England
- Died: 14 February 2002 (aged 85); Oakland, California, US
- Education: Christ's College, Cambridge
- Awards: Gold Medal of the Archaeological Institute of America (1988)
- Scientific career
- Fields: prehistoric Africa
- Workplaces: University of California, Berkeley

John Desmond Clark CBE FSA (10 April 1916 – 14 February 2002) was a British archaeologist noted particularly for his work on prehistoric Africa.

== Early life ==
Clark was born in London, but his childhood was spent in a hamlet in the Chiltern Hills of Buckinghamshire. Clark went to a preparatory boarding school in Buckinghamshire at age 6 1/2, from where he moved on to Monkton Combe School near Bath. Clark graduated with a BA from Christ's College, Cambridge, under M. C. Burkitt and Grahame Clark (no relation).

== Archeological and anthropological career ==
In 1937 Clark became the curator of Northern Rhodesia's Rhodes-Livingstone Museum (now known as the Livingstone Memorial Museum). A year later he married Betty Cable née Baume, who would accompany him on a number of expeditions throughout his life. Clark served in the military during World War II with the East Africa Command forces in Somalia and Ethiopia, being subsequently attached to the British Military Administration, when he managed to find time to carry out archaeological fieldwork in the Horn of Africa. Following the war, he returned to Cambridge, completing his PhD in 1947. In 1948 he founded the Northern Rhodesian National Monuments Commission.

Clark then returned to Northern Rhodesia to serve once more as the museum's director. In 1953, Clark ordered an excavation at Kalambo Falls, a 235m high, single-drop waterfall at the southeast end of Lake Tanganyika, on what is now the border between Zambia and Tanzania. The site would eventually emerge as one of the most important archaeological finds of the twentieth century, providing a record of more than two hundred and fifty thousand years of human history. To date, artefacts of Acheulean, Sangoan, Lupemban, Magosian, Wilton, and Bantu cultures have all been found at the falls. Clark also undertook significant fieldwork in Ethiopia, Somalia, Malawi, Angola, and Niger, some of which led him to collaborate with Louis and Mary Leakey.

In 1961, Clark resigned from his post as director of the museum (being succeeded by Gervas C.R. Clay), and became Professor of Anthropology (subsequently Emeritus) at the University of California, Berkeley, where he taught until his retirement in 1986. Under his guidance, the programme became one of the world's foremost in paleoanthropology. In 1965, he was elected a Fellow of the American Academy of Arts and Sciences. He received the Gold Medal Award for Distinguished Archaeological Achievement in 1988 from the Archaeological Institute of America. Clark continued working until his death, including a 1991 dig in China that was the first to be led in that country by foreign archaeologists in more than 40 years. Clark died of pneumonia in Oakland in 2002, having published more than twenty books and over 300 scholarly papers on paleoanthropology and African prehistory in the course of his career. His wife survived him by only two months. He is survived by his children, Elizabeth and John.

Over the course of his career, Clark compiled a large scholarly library of scientific books and articles which he donated to his former students, archaeologists Nicholas Toth and Kathy Schick, at the Stone Age Institute where the collection is now housed as the Desmond Clark Memorial Library.

== Honours ==
Clark was appointed OBE in 1956 and CBE in 1960. He was elected FSA in 1952 and FBA in 1961. He was a Fellow of the American Academy of Arts and Sciences, and of the National Academy of Sciences (USA). He received the Golden Plate Award of the American Academy of Achievement in 1982. His Cambridge ScD was awarded in 1975 and honorary doctorates at Witwatersrand and Cape Town universities in 1985, along with the Gold Medals of the Society of Antiquaries of London (1985) and the Archaeological Institute of America (1989). The British Academy awarded him the Grahame Clark Medal for Prehistory in 1997. He became an American citizen in 1993.

== Selected works ==
- Clark, J. D. (1954). The Prehistoric Cultures of the Horn of Africa. University Press.
- Clark, John Desmond (1959). The prehistory of Southern Africa. Penguin Books.
- Prehistoric Cultures of Northeast Angola and Their Significance in Tropical Africa (1963)
- Bishop, Walter W; Clark, John Desmond (1967). Background to Evolution in Africa: Systematic Investigation of the African Later Tertiary and Quaternary. University of Chicago Press. with Walter W. Bishop
- Background to Evolution in Africa (1967) (Joint Editor)
- Atlas of African Prehistory (1967)
- Further Palaeo-Anthropological Studies in Northern Lunda (1968)
- Kalambo Falls Prehistoric Site (Vol.1, 1969; Vol.2, 1974; Vol. 3, 2001)
- The Prehistory of Africa (1970)
- J Desmond Clark, ed. (1977). "From the Earliest Times to c. 500 B.C.". The Cambridge History of Africa. Vol. 1. Cambridge University Press. ISBN 978-0-521-20701-0.
- The Acheulean and the Plio-Pleistocene Deposits of the Middle Awash Valley, Ethiopia (2000)
- See also African Archaeological Review 5, 1987; and the Journal of Human Evolution 15(8) and 16(7/8), 1987
