= Saldanha man =

Hominin fossil

Coordinates: 33°05′30″S 18°14′20″E

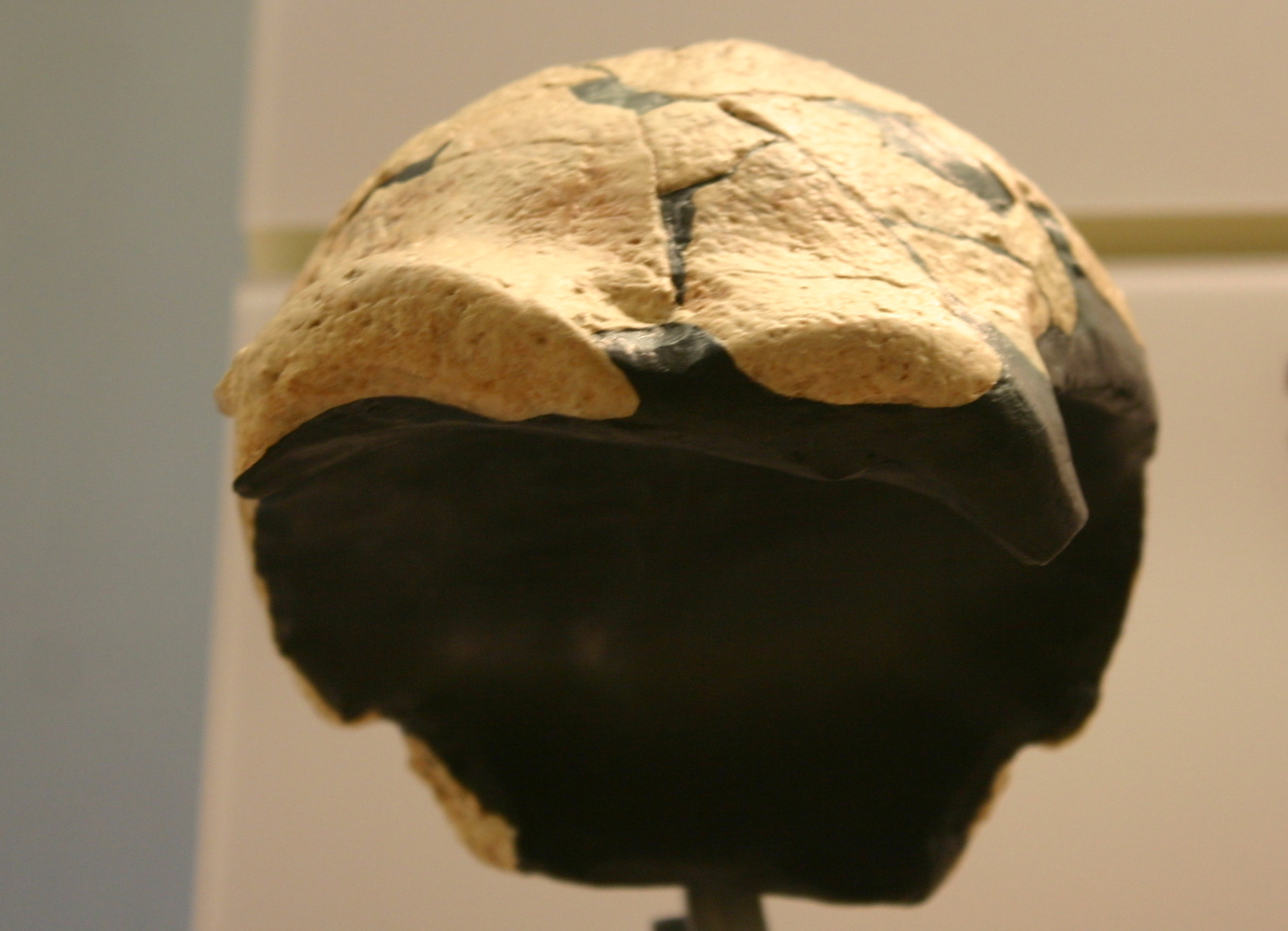
- Saldanha skull, Smithsonian Natural History Museum
- Common name: Saldanha man
- Species: Homo heidelbergensis
- Place discovered: Hopefield, Saldanha Bay Local Municipality, South Africa
- Date discovered: 8 January 1953
- Discovered by: Keith Jolly and Ronald Singer

Saldanha man also known as Saldanha cranium or Elandsfontein cranium are fossilized remains of an archaic human. It is one of the key specimens for Homo heidelbergensis. It has not been dated directly, and is estimated to be roughly 0.5 million years old. The remains, which included a fragment of lower jaw, were found on an exposed surface between shifting sand dunes on the farm Elandsfontein, which is located near Hopefield, South Africa.

It was found associated with a variety of fossil vertebrates, and initially classified as Homo saldanensis (Drennan 1955). Singer (1954) noted close resemblance to Kabwe 1 at Broken Hill (Zambia) and LH 18 at Laetoli (Tanzania). (Note: also called the Broken Hill skull; Rhodesian Man is a Middle Paleolithic fossil assigned by Arthur Smith Woodward in 1921 as the type specimen for Homo rhodesiensis, now mostly considered a synonym of Homo heidelbergensis. The cranium was discovered in the lead and zinc mine of Broken Hill, Northern Rhodesia (now Kabwe, Zambia).) Comparison with Kabwe 1 specifically, and thus classification as African H. heidelbergensis (H. rhodesiensis) was also regularly supported by later authors.

== See also ==
- List of human fossils
