= Magosian =

Archaeological culture in Africa

The Magosian is the name given by archaeologists to an industry found in southern and eastern Africa. It dates to between 10,000 and 6,000 years BC and is distinguished from its predecessors by the use of microliths and small blades.

In 1953, J. Desmond Clark found a notable site of Magosian artifacts at Kalambo Falls, on what is now the border between Zambia and Tanzania.
