= Bizot group =

International museum organisation

The Bizot group, sometimes called The International Group of Organizers of Major Exhibitions, and also known as Groupe Bizot (named after Irène Bizot, director of the Réunion des musées nationaux, the origin of this group), is a group, founded in 1992, which periodically brings together the directors of the largest museums in the world, constituting a place for exchanging ideas, recent museum news, and a forum for discussing ideas.

== Purpose ==
These meetings are intended to facilitate trade between major museums, both in terms of works and exhibitions that ideas. The group initially included only European institutions, but then expanded to other selected institutions.

In December 2002, the Bizot group published a declaration, "Declaration on the Importance and Value of Universal Museums", in which it argues against requests for the return of objects or installations by the countries from which these objects originated, and defends the interest of "universal museums".

== Members ==
A letter of November 2014, from the consolidation, cites the main members of the group at the time.

The current members are:

- Réunion des musées nationaux et du Grand Palais des Champs-Élysées
- National Gallery Singapore
- Musée du Louvre
- Musée d'Art moderne de la Ville de Paris
- Musée d'Orsay
- Musée des beaux-arts de Lyon
- Metropolitan Museum of Art
- British Museum
- Rijksmuseum
- Centre national d'art et de culture Georges-Pompidou
- Musée des beaux-arts de Montréal
- Musée de l'Ermitage
- Musée des beaux-arts du Canada
- Art Gallery of Ontario
- Royal Museums of Fine Arts of Belgium
- Musées royaux d'art et d'histoire de Bruxelles
- Museo Reina Sofía
- Musée du Prado
- Museu Nacional d'Art de Catalunya
- Art Institute of Chicago
- Museum of Fine Arts (Budapest)

== Previous meetings (selected) ==
- Washington (2025)
- Berlin, 2015
- Montréal, 2006
- Munich, 2003
