= Kabwe mine =

Lead mine in Zambia

- Kabwe mine
- Location: Kabwe, Central Province, Zambia,Zambia; 14°27′36″S 28°26′06″E
- Products: Lead, zinc, and other minerals
- Production: over 2.6 million tonnes
- Active: 1906 to 1994; artisanal mining continues to present
- Company: Anglo American plc; Zambian government

Local impacts
- Pollution: Lead poisoning
- Impacted: hundreds of thousands of people

The Kabwe mine or Broken Hill mine is a former lead smelting and mining site near Kabwe, Zambia, that operated from 1906 to 1994. At its peak, between 1925 and 1974, it was owned by Anglo American plc and was Africa's largest lead producer. The mine produced extremely toxic lead pollution for ninety years. Several studies have confirmed that over 100,000 people near the mine, including tens of thousands of children, suffer from lead poisoning. Kabwe is one of the world's most polluted towns.

In 1921, a "bone cave" that included a fossilised human skull called Kabwe 1 was discovered in the mine. This fossil was the first remains of an extinct human relative to be found in Africa. The skull was studied by Arthur Smith Woodward of the British Museum of Natural History, who published a paper naming the new human precursor Homo rhodesiensis. Study of the Kabwe skull has had important implications for understanding of human evolution and prehistory.

The mine was privatised and closed by the Zambian government in 1995. In 2021, there were still about five million tons of mine tailings on the site, and the Zambian government had licensed reprocessing of this waste and further mining by the South African company Jubilee Metals. The area is also mined by artisanal miners. All of these activities pose ongoing health risks for local communities by releasing additional lead.

In July 2021, UN special rapporteurs urged the Zambian government to remediate the toxic site. Human rights and environmental organisations also urged the government to address the pollution and resulting health problems in local communities. A lawsuit against Anglo American concerning the pollution was ongoing in South Africa in 2023.

== Background ==
Kabwe is located near the African Copperbelt, 100 kilometres (62 mi) north of Zambia's capital, Lusaka. The town had a population of about 220,000 in 2017. The mine and the area around it were originally called "Broken Hill" after a mine in Australia that possessed similar ores. The area was renamed "Kabwe" after Zambian independence in 1964. Mining in Zambia continues to provide over 40% of government revenue, although it has provided few benefits to local communities who frequently live in poverty.

Lead poisoning most seriously affects children who are exposed to lead in dust and frequently put their hands in their mouths. This poisoning can affect brain development and cause permanent damage at a young age. Severe exposure can cause death. Lead in the blood above 5 μg/dL is considered elevated, and death is likely when levels are above 150 μg/dL. The United States Center for Disease Control (CDC) has set 3.5 μg/dL as the allowable level of lead in the blood.

== History ==
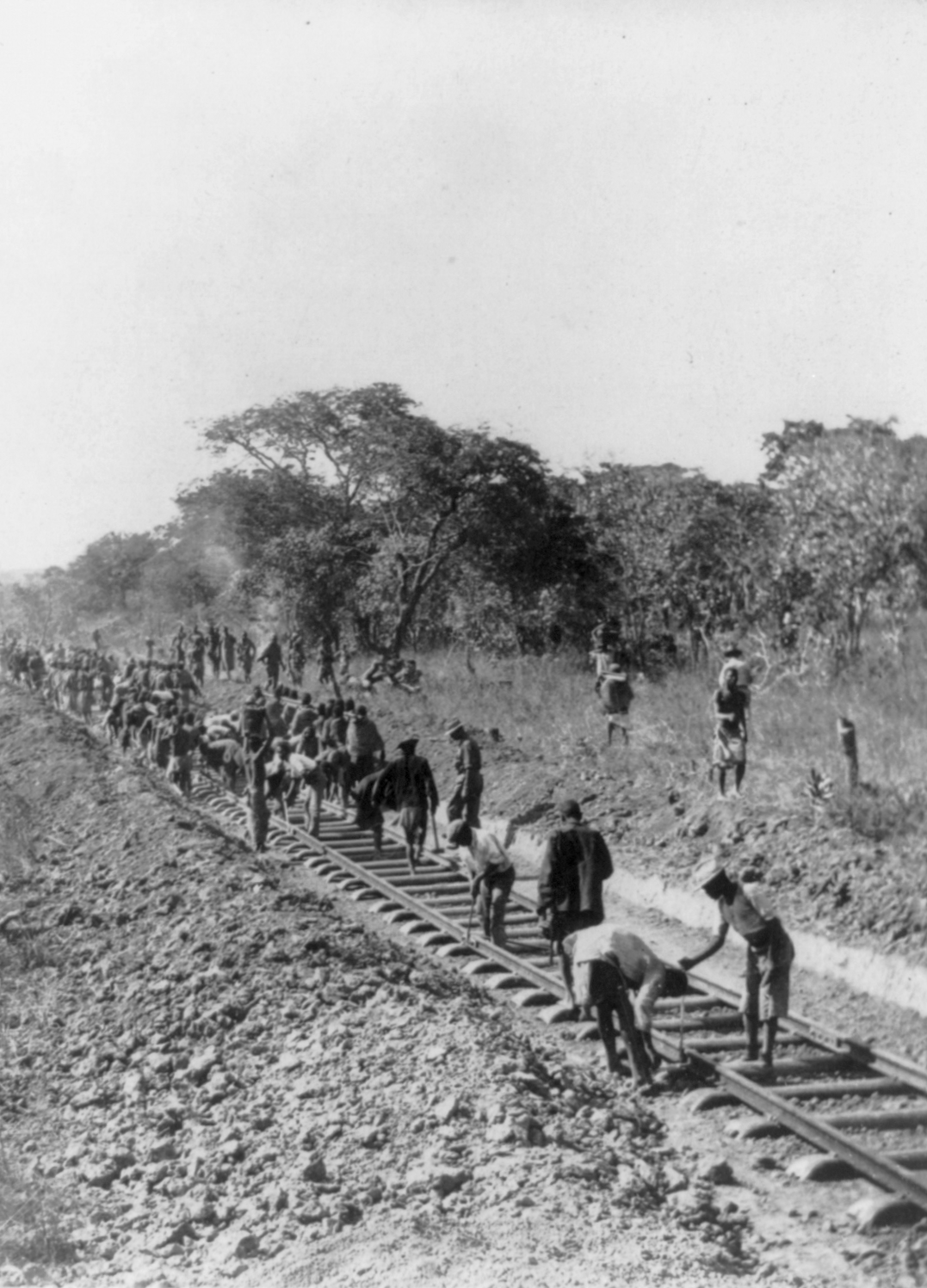
Part of the railway near Kabwe under construction (c. 1906)

During its life, the mine produced over 1.8 million tons (mt) of zinc, 0.8 mt of lead metal; 7,816 tonnes of vanadium oxide; 80,000 kilograms of silver; and 235,000 kilograms of cadmium.

Mining began in 1904 and reached commercial production in 1906 when the first railway in the country, operated by Rhodesian Railways, reached the Broken Hill mine. During its peak production from 1925 to 1974, the mine was majority owned by Anglo American plc, which was headquartered in South Africa at the time. Anglo American is one of the largest mining companies in the world. The Zambian government then took over the mine until it closed in 1994. Anglo American has said it never owned or operated the mine.

In 2021, there were still about 5 million tons of mine tailings on the site, and the Zambian government had licensed reprocessing of this waste and further mining by the South African company Jubilee Metals. The area is also mined by artisanal miners.

=== Geology ===
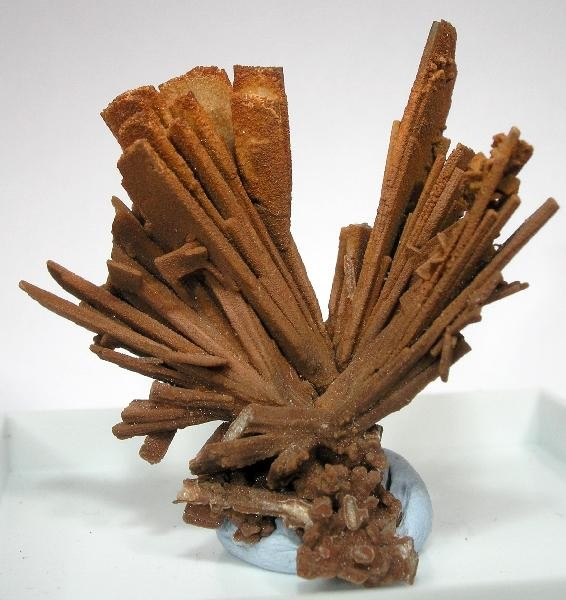
Hopeite-Hemimorphite specimen from Kabwe mine

Europeans discovered the Kabwe deposit in 1902. In 1929, observers reported large caves, "lined with beautiful crystals of pyromorphite and cerussite", as well as descloizite and vanadinite.

The Kabwe deposit is a carbonate hosted lead-zinc deposit consisting of four primary orebodies. The ore is primarily sphalerite, galena, pyrite, chalcopyrite, briartite and renierite. There are many other secondary minerals. Many aesthetic mineral specimens were produced at Kabwe, some of which were acquired by the British royal family. Many of these specimens were also donated to the British Museum of Natural History.

== Pollution ==
The mine operated without environmental regulation and poisoned hundreds of thousands of people, especially between 1925 and 1974. Numerous studies since 1971 have confirmed a pattern of lead poisoning in the area, and Kabwe remains one of the world's most polluted towns.

A 2011 research project funded by the World Bank determined that lead contamination of soils in nearby communities was 10 times the level allowed by the CDC (which is 400 ppm), and contamination was as high as 10,000 ppm in some places—including the grounds of a local health clinic. A 2015 study found that 100% of children tested had blood lead levels (BLL) exceeding CDC guidelines. Many children have BLLs above 45 μg/dL. A 2018 analysis of results from previous lead toxicity studies confirmed that local communities had high blood lead levels, especially among children and pregnant mothers. Many of these people required immediate medical intervention. A 2020 study assessing population-wide lead exposure found an average BLL of 11.9 μg/dL; over 200,000 people had a BLL above 5 μg/dL.

=== Conflict ===
In October 2020, a lawsuit was filed in South Africa against Anglo American on behalf of lead poisoning victims. This lawsuit was ongoing in January 2023 when the High Court of South Africa heard plaintiffs' request to turn the case into a class action lawsuit for as many as 140,000 women and children affected by the lead poisoning. The lawsuit could set an important precedent for holding corporations accountable for local impacts in African courts.

Anglo American says that it provided technical services at the mine and that the state-owned Zambia Consolidated Copper Mines has accepted liability for the poisoning.

=== Cleanup ===
In 2015, some cleanup was funded by environmental groups, and contaminated soil was removed and replaced for about 120 of the most polluted homes. By 2021, the Zambian government had taken some actions to provide healthcare for people but had not taken steps to clean up the toxic waste.

== Fossil skull ==
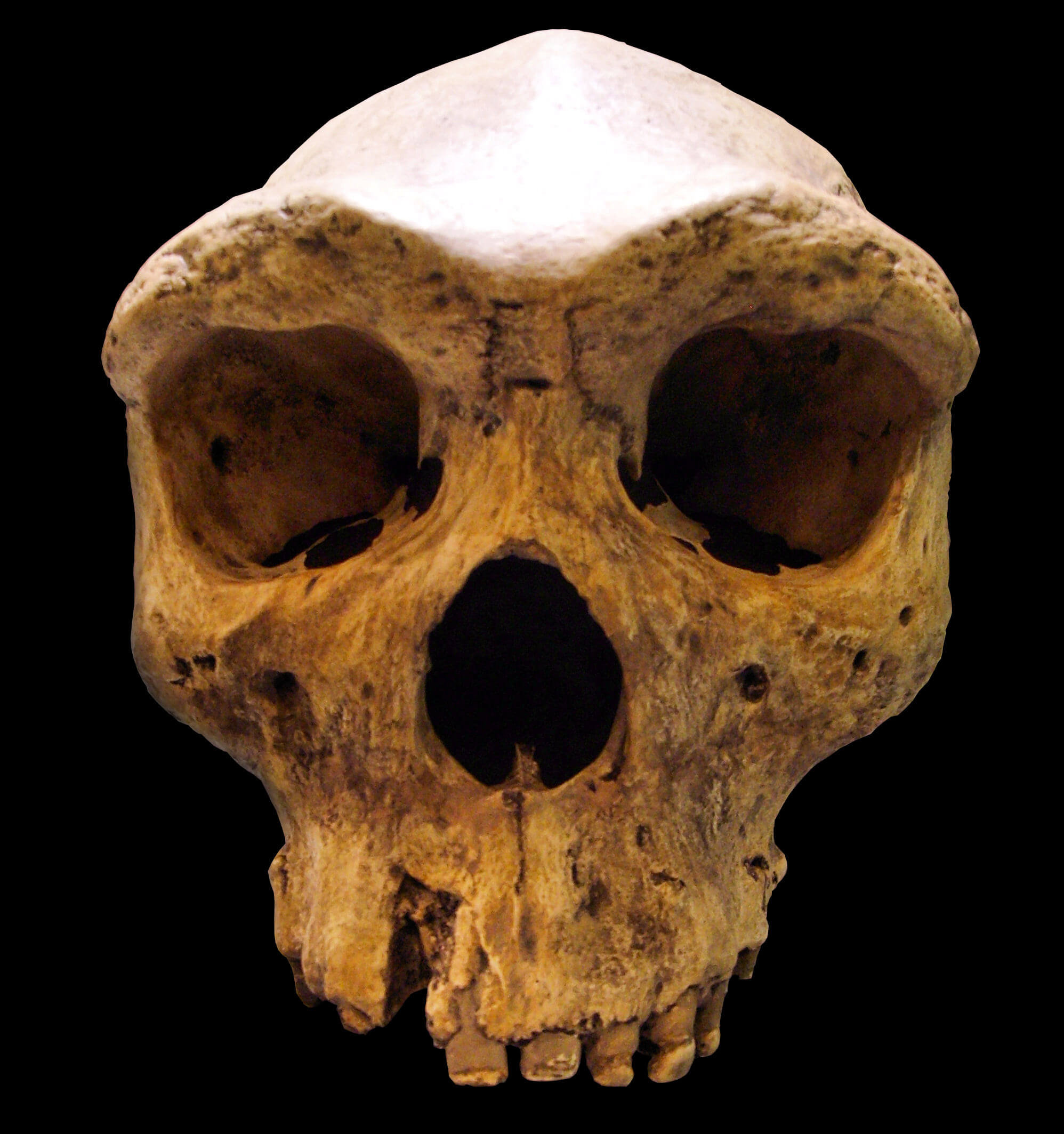
Replica of Kabwe 1

In 1921, two miners discovered a fossilised skull and some other human remains in the mine. The bones were sent to the London Museum of Natural History, and Arthur Smith Woodward published a paper naming the new human precursor Homo rhodesiensis. This fossil was the first remains of an extinct human relative to be found in Africa. The species was later determined to be Homo heidelbergensis.

The skull remains at the London Museum, and the Zambian government has requested that it be returned. It has been difficult to determine the age of the skull, partly because the area where it was found has been destroyed by mining activity. Original estimates dated the skull at 500,000 years old, but studies in 2020 used radioactive uranium isotopes to date the skull at closer to 300,000 years old.
