= Frederick Gymer Parsons =

British writer, anatomist and anthropologist (1863–1943)

Frederick Gymer Parsons FRCS FZS (1863 – 11 March 1943) was a British writer and scientist, specialising in the fields of anatomy and anthropology. He contributed numerous anatomical articles to the 1911 eleventh edition of Encyclopædia Britannica.
