= Sangoan =

Paleolithic Tool Manufacturing Style

The Sangoan is the name given by archaeologists to a Palaeolithic tool manufacturing style which may have developed from the earlier Acheulian types. In addition to the Acheulian stone tools, bone and antler picks were also used. Sangoan toolkits were used especially for grubbing.

As originally proposed, the Sangoan period was broadly analogous to the Mousterian culture in Europe and was dated to about 130 to 10 thousand years (kya). This was misleading because the Mousterian culture was predominantly made by Neanderthals, not by modern humans as in Africa. Dating was complicated by the lack of stratified deposits even after newer dating methods became available since 1980. Some sites have become available that indicate the Sangoan industry was produced before 250 kya, perhaps substantially earlier. It continues to be considered transitional between the African early Stone Age and middle Stone Age, but the MSA transition is now considered to have begun 500-350 kya.

It is named after the site of Sango Bay in Uganda where it was first discerned in 1920. Although Desmond Clark considered the complex to be tied to the tropical forest, the peoples who used Sangoan tools were hunting and gathering cultures, also known as the Sangoan, occupied southern Africa in areas where annual rainfall now is less than 1,016 millimetres (40.0 in) and Central African areas whose rainfall is above 2000 mm from the beginning of the Upper Paleolithic period. The Sangoan industry was distributed broadly from present day Botswana to Ethiopia and from Uganda to Angola and Gabon. In the Kalahari Desert, many prehistoric stone tools have been recovered by archaeologists dating at least as early as the period of the Sangoan culture. It also went as far north as the forested regions of the Congo. Confusion exists within literature as to what to call this early percussion-made bifacial complex, with certain writers stating the term Lupemban, or the term Sangoan.

Confusion exists as to how to define the Sangoan. Dating is not refined enough to clarify the climate conditions at the time the tools were deposited in the various sites. The Lupemban industry has been found in similar environments and may be more closely associated with forests. The technical details of the differences between the two are not clear. Both are associated with prepared cores typical of the middle Stone Age. The Lupemban industry is usually associated with more frequent long lance-like or leaf shaped, biface points (finished on both sides). The early versions are both are made with percussion knapping. The name Lupemban is applied to certain biface points made more recently, possibly in the late Pleistocene, in which indirect and direct pressure flaking is observed, but these techniques are not characteristics which separate the early Lupemban and Sangoan.
