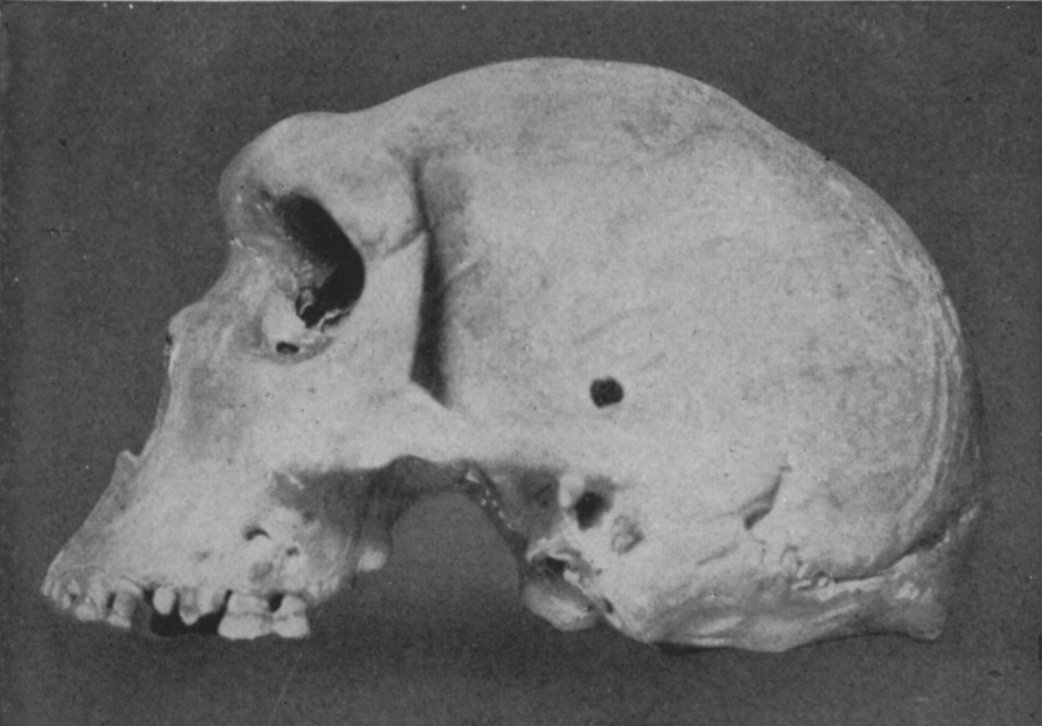
- Kabwe skull (1922 photograph)

Scientific classification
- Kingdom: Animalia
- Phylum: Chordata
- Class: Mammalia
- Order: Primates
- Superfamily: Hominoidea
- Family: Hominidae
- Subtribe: Hominina
- Genus: Homo
- Species: †H. rhodesiensis

Binomial name
- †Homo rhodesiensis Woodward, 1921

= Homo rhodesiensis =

Homo rhodesiensis Temporal range: Middle Pleistocene 1.2–0.3 Ma

Species of primate (fossil)

Homo rhodesiensis is the species name proposed by Arthur Smith Woodward (1921) to classify Kabwe 1 (the "Kabwe skull" or "Broken Hill skull", also "Rhodesian Man"), a Middle Stone Age fossil recovered from Broken Hill mine in Kabwe, Northern Rhodesia (now Zambia). In 2020, the skull was dated to 324,000 to 274,000 years ago. Other similar older specimens also exist.

H. rhodesiensis is now widely considered a synonym of H. heidelbergensis. Other designations such as Homo sapiens arcaicus and H. sapiens rhodesiensis have also been proposed.

== Fossils ==
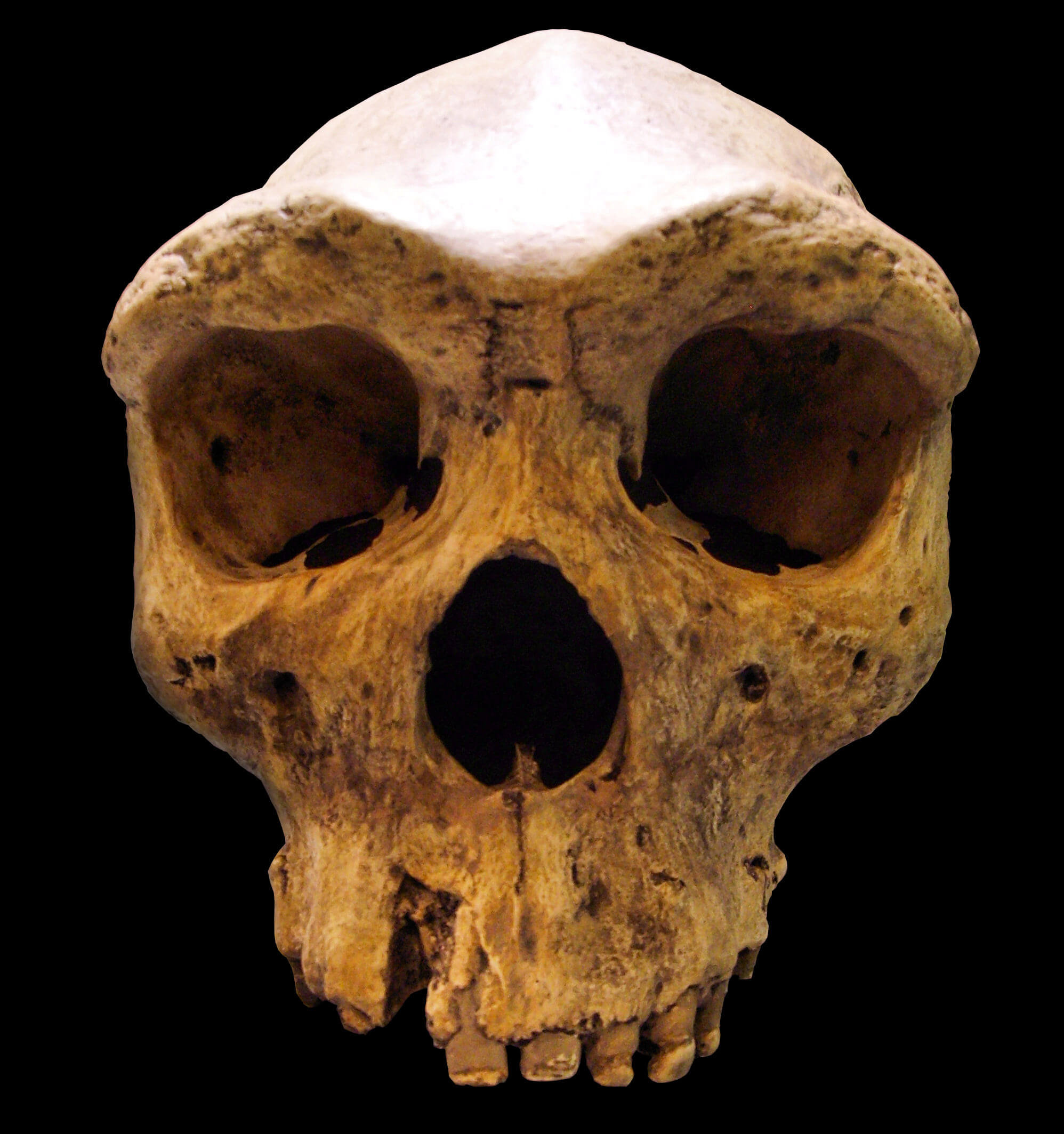
Replica of the Kabwe cranium

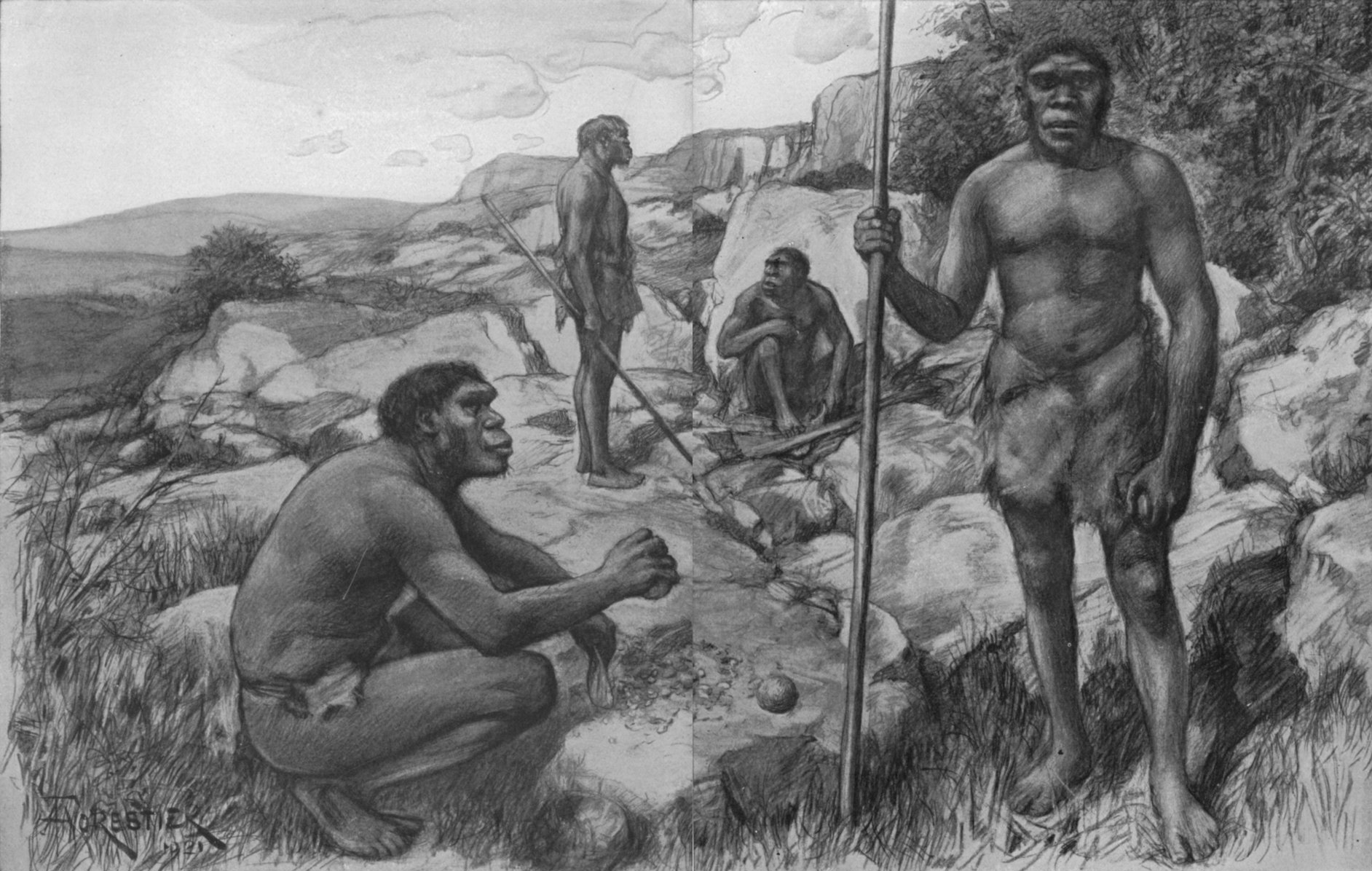
Interpretation of "Rhodesian Men" by Amédée Forestier (1922)

A number of morphologically comparable fossil remains came to light in East Africa (Bodo, Ndutu, Eyasi, Ileret) and North Africa (Salé, Rabat, Dar-es-Soltane, Djbel Irhoud, Sidi Aberrahaman, Tighenif) during the 20th century.

- Kabwe 1, also called the "Broken Hill skull" or "Rhodesian Man", was assigned by Arthur Smith Woodward in 1921 as the type specimen for Homo rhodesiensis; most contemporary scientists forego the taxon "rhodesiensis" altogether and assign it to Homo heidelbergensis. The cranium was discovered in Broken Hill lead mine in Mutwe Wa Nsofu Area of Northern Rhodesia (now Kabwe, Zambia) on June 17, 1921 by two miners. In addition to the cranium, an upper jaw from another individual, a sacrum, a tibia, and two femur fragments were also found.
- Bodo cranium, a 600,000-year-old fossil was found in 1976 by members of an expedition led by Jon Kalb at Bodo D'ar in the Awash River valley of Ethiopia. It was discovered by the Rift Valley Research Mission which conducted a number of surveys that led to the findings of Acheulean tools and animal fossils alongside the Bodo Cranium. The first specimen was discovered by Alemayhew Asfaw and Charles Smart, who found a lower face. Two weeks later, Paul Whitehead and Craig Wood found the upper portion of the face. Pieces of the cranium were discovered along the surface of one of the dry branches of the Awash River in Ethiopia. The cranium, artifacts, and other animal fossils were found over a relatively large area of medium sand, and only a few of the tools were found near the cranium. Although the skull is most similar to those of Kabwe, Woodward's nomenclature was discontinued and its discoverers attributed it to H. heidelbergensis. It has features that represent a transition between H. ergaster/erectus and H. sapiens.
- Ndutu cranium, discovered from Lake Ndutu in northern Tanzania, is around 320,000 to 600,000 years old. In 1976 Ronald J. Clarke classified it as H. erectus and it has generally been viewed that way, although points of similarity to H. sapiens have also been recognized. After comparative studies with similar finds in Africa allocation to an African subspecies of H. sapiens was considered most appropriate by Phillip Rightmire. An indirect cranial capacity estimate suggests 1100 ml. Its supratoral sulcus morphology and the presence of protuberance as suggested by Rightmire "give the Ndutu occiput an appearance which is also unlike that of Homo erectus". And in a 1989 publication Clarke concluded: "It is assigned to archaic H. sapiens on the basis of its expanded parietal and occipital regions of the brain". But Stinger (1986) pointed out that a thickened iliac pillar is typical for H. erectus. In 2016, Chris Stringer classified the cranium as belonging to H. heidelbergensis/H. rhodesiensis (a species considered to be intermediate between H. erectus and H. sapiens) rather than as early H. sapiens, but considers it to display a "more sapiens-like zygomaxillary morphology" than certain other examples of H. rhodesiensis.
- The Saldanha cranium found in 1953 in South Africa, and estimated at around 500,000 years old, was subject to at least three taxonomic revisions from 1955 to 1996.

Hominin timeline
← / Earlier apes; ← / Gorilla split; ← / Chimpanzee split; ← / Earliest bipedal; ← / Earliest sign of Ardipithecus; ← / Earliest sign of Australopithecus; ← / Earliest stone tools; ← / Earliest sign of Homo; ← / Dispersal beyond Africa; ← / Earliest fire / cooking; ← / Earliest rock art; ← / Earliest clothes; ← / Modern humans
(million years ago)

== Bodo cranium ==
=== Feature ===
This specimen has an unusually large cranial capacity for its age that is estimated at around 1250 cc (in the range between ~1,200–1,325 cc) within the (lower) range of modern Homo sapiens. The cranium includes the face, much of the frontal bone, parts of the midvault and the base anterior to the foramen magnum. The cranial length, width and height are 21 cm (8.3 in), 15.87 cm (6.2 in) and 19.05 cm (7.5 in) respectively. Researchers have suggested that Bodo butchered animals because Acheulean hand axes and cleavers, along with animal bones, were found at the site. Cuts on the Bodo cranium show the earliest evidence of removal of flesh immediately after the death of an individual using a stone tool. The findings of symmetrical cut marks with specific patterns and directionality on the cranium serve as strong evidence that de-fleshing was done purposefully for mortuary practices and represents the earliest evidence of non-utilitarian mortuary practices. The cut marks were located "laterally among the maxilla" causing speculation among researchers that the specific reason for de-fleshing was to remove the mandible.

=== Morphology ===
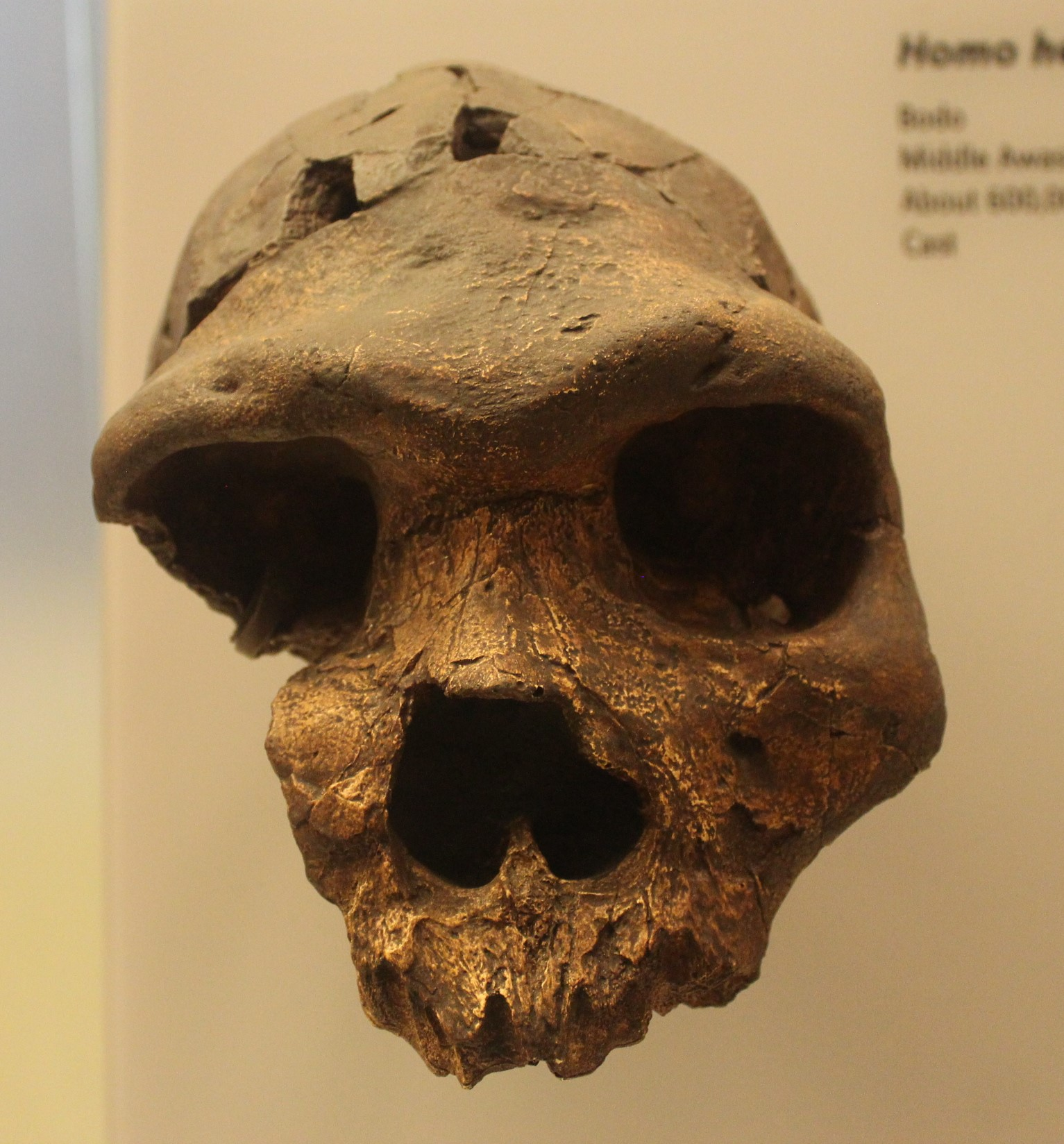
Replica of Bodo cranium, National Museum of Natural History

The front of the Bodo cranium is very broad and supports large supraorbital structures. The supraorbital torus projects and is heavily constructed, especially in the central parts of the cranium. The glabella is rounded and projects strongly. Like H. erectus, the brain case is low and archaic in appearance. The vault bones are also thick like H. erectus specimens. Due to the large cranial capacity, there is a wider midvault which includes signs of parietal bossing as well as a high contour of the temporal squama. The parietal length can't be accurately determined because that section of the specimen is incomplete. Though the mastoid is missing, insights regarding the specimen can be determined using fragments from the individual collected at the scene in 1981. The cranium's parietal walls expand relative to the bitemporal width in a way that is characteristic of modern humans. The squamosal suture has a high arch which is present in modern human craniums as well.

=== Evolutionary significance ===
The cranium has an unusual appearance, which has led to debates over its taxonomy. It displays both primitive and derived features, such as a cranial capacity more similar to modern humans and a projecting supraorbital torus more like H. erectus. Bodo and other Mid-Pleistocene hominin fossils appear to represent a lineage between H. erectus and anatomically modern humans, although its exact location in the human evolutionary tree is still uncertain. Due to the similarities to both Homo erectus and modern humans, it has been postulated that the Bodo cranium, as well as other members of H. heidelbergensis were part of a group of hominins that evolved distinct from H. erectus early in the Middle Pleistocene. Despite the similarities, there is still a question of where exactly H. heidelbergensis evolved. The increased encephalization seen in fossils like the Bodo cranium is thought to have been a driving force in the speciation of anatomically modern humans.

=== Similarities between the Bodo cranium and Kabwe cranium ===
Both the Bodo cranium and the Kabwe cranium share a number of similarities. Both have cranial capacities similar to, but on the low end of the range of modern humans (1250 cc vs 1230 cc). Both craniums have a very large supraorbital torus. These two features together suggest that they are a link between H. erectus and H. sapiens. The morphology and the taxonomy are most similar to other specimens of type H. heidelbergensis. Both the Bodo and Kabwe specimens can be described as archaic because they retain certain features in common with Homo erectus. However, both exhibit important differences from Homo erectus in their anatomy, such as the contour of their parietals, the shape of their temporal bones, the cranial base, and the morphology of their nose and palate. While there are many similarities, there are a few differences between the specimens, including the entire brow of the Bodo cranium, particularly the lateral segments, which are less thick than the Kabwe specimen.

== Homo bodoensis ==
In 2021, Canadian anthropologist Mirjana Roksandic and colleagues recommended the complete dissolution of H. heidelbergensis and H. rhodesiensis, as the name rhodesiensis honours English diamond magnate Cecil Rhodes who disenfranchised the black population in southern Africa. They classified all European H. heidelbergensis as H. neanderthalensis, and synonymised H. rhodesiensis with a new species they named H. bodoensis which includes all African specimens, and potentially some from the Levant and the Balkans which have no Neanderthal-derived traits (namely Ceprano, Mala Balanica, HaZore'a and Nadaouiyeh Aïn Askar). H. bodoensis is supposed to represent the immediate ancestor of modern humans, but does not include the last common ancestor of modern humans and Neanderthals. They suggested the confusing morphology of the Middle Pleistocene was caused by periodic H. bodoensis migration events into Europe following population collapses after glacial cycles, interbreeding with surviving indigenous populations. Their taxonomic recommendations were rejected by Stringer and others as they failed to explain how exactly their proposals would resolve anything, in addition to violating nomenclatural rules.

== See also ==
- List of fossil sites
- List of hominina fossils

== Literature ==
- Woodward, Arthur Smith (1921). "A New Cave Man from Rhodesia, South Africa". Nature. 108 (2716): 371–372. Bibcode:1921Natur.108..371W. doi:10.1038/108371a0.
- Singer Robert R. and J. Wymer (1968). "Archaeological Investigation at the Saldanha Skull Site in South Africa". The South African Archaeological Bulletin. 23 (3). The South African Archaeological Bulletin, Vol. 23, No. 91: 63–73. doi:10.2307/3888485. JSTOR 3888485.
- Murrill, Rupert I. (1975). "A comparison of the Rhodesian and Petralona upper jaws in relation to other Pleistocene hominids". Zeitschrift für Morphologie und Anthropologie. 66 (2): 176–187. doi:10.1127/zma/66/1975/176. PMID 806185. S2CID 3097781..
- Murrill, Rupert Ivan (1981). Ed. Charles C. Thomas (ed.). Petralona Man. A Descriptive and Comparative Study, with New Information on Rhodesian Man. Springfield, Illinois: Thomas. ISBN 0-398-04550-X.
- Rightmire, G. Philip (2005). "The Lake Ndutu cranium and early Homo sapiens in Africa". American Journal of Physical Anthropology. 61 (2): 245–254. doi:10.1002/ajpa.1330610214. PMID 6410925..
- Asfaw, Berhane (2005). "A new hominid parietal from Bodo, middle Awash Valley, Ethiopia". American Journal of Physical Anthropology. 61 (3): 367–371. doi:10.1002/ajpa.1330610311. PMID 6412559..
