= Broken Hill mine =

Mine in Australia

- Location: New South Wales, Australia
- Products: Lead, Zinc

The Broken Hill mine is one of the largest lead mines in Australia, located in western New South Wales. The mine has ore reserves amounting to 20.9 million tonnes of ore grading 7.4% lead, 9.4% zinc and 61.5 million oz of silver.
