= Lupemban culture =

Ancient Central African culture

The Lupemban is a central African archaeological culture which, though once thought to date between c. 30,000 and 12,000 BC, is now generally recognised to be far older (dates of c. 300,000 have been obtained from Twin Rivers, Zambia and Muguruk, Kenya). The industry is characterised by the occurrence of bi-facially flaked lanceolate points. It has been postulated that Lupemban tools, being generally distributed within the modern day Congo forest belt, may have been adapted to woodworking. The lanceolate points are commonly interpreted as being the surviving elements of composite spears.

Activity sites include: Kalambo Falls and Dundo.
