= Stone Age =

Prehistoric period before metal tools

- 3.4 MYA – 3000 BC
Pliocene
- Bronze Age
- Copper Age
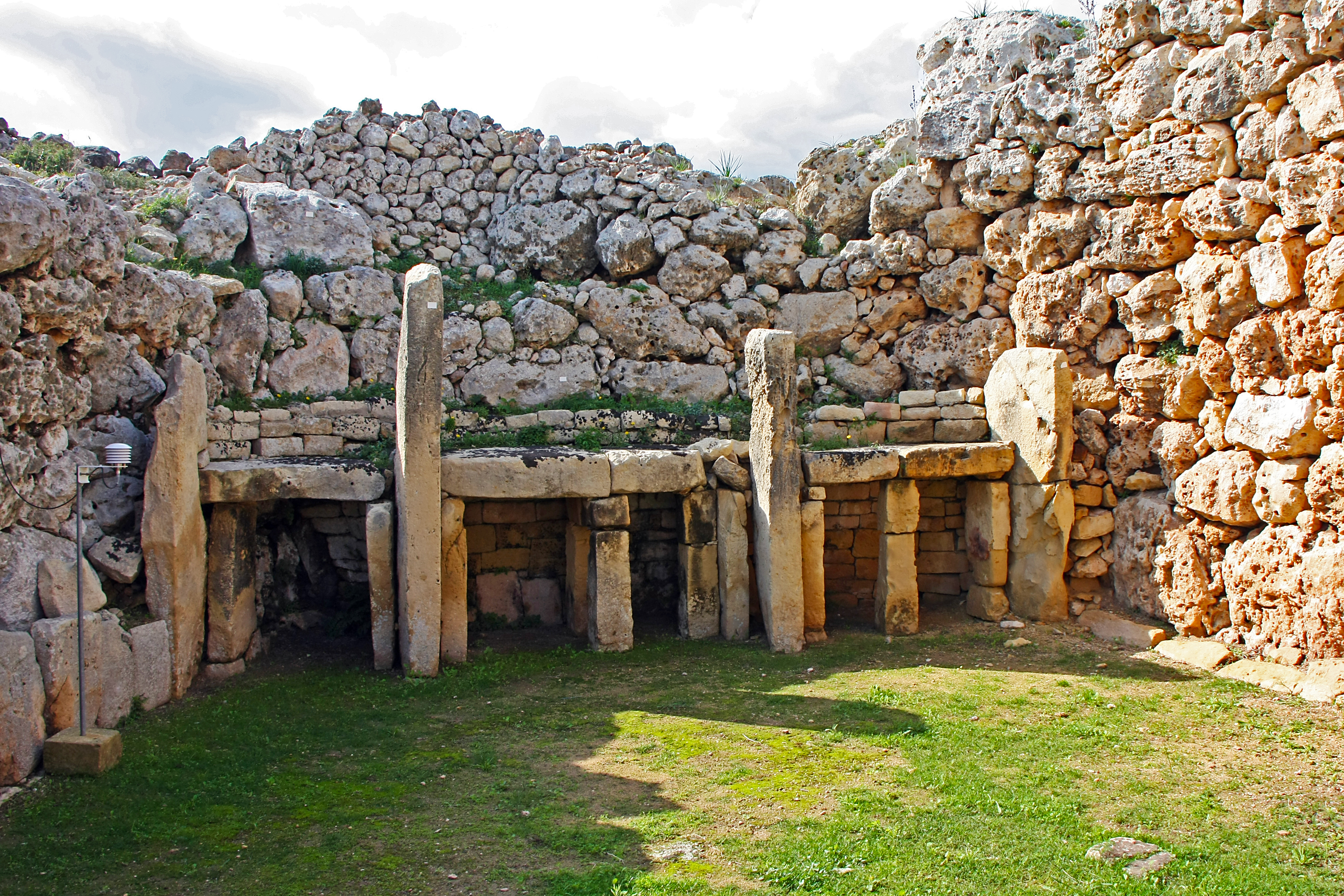
- Ġgantija temples in Gozo, Malta, c. 3600–2500 BC, some of the world's oldest free-standing structures
- Location: Global

The Stone Age was a broad prehistoric period during which stone was widely used to make stone tools with an edge, a point, or a percussion surface. The period lasted for roughly 3.4 million years and ended between 4000 BC and 2000 BC, with the advent of metalworking. Because of its enormous timescale, it encompasses over 99% of human history.

Though some simple metalworking of malleable metals, particularly the use of gold and copper for purposes of ornamentation, was known in the Stone Age, it is the melting and smelting of copper that marks the end of the Stone Age. In Western Asia, this occurred by about 3000 BC, when bronze became widespread. The term Bronze Age is used to describe the period that followed the Stone Age, as well as to describe cultures that had developed techniques and technologies for working copper alloys (bronze: originally copper and arsenic, later copper and tin) into tools, supplanting stone in many uses.

Stone Age artifacts that have been discovered include tools used by modern humans, by their predecessor species in the genus Homo, and possibly by the earlier partly contemporaneous genera Australopithecus and Paranthropus. Bone tools have been discovered that were used during this period as well but these are rarely preserved in the archaeological record. The Stone Age is further subdivided by the types of stone tools in use.

The Stone Age is the first period in the three-age system frequently used in archaeology to divide the timeline of human technological prehistory (especially in Europe and western Asia) into functional periods, with the next two being the Bronze Age and the Iron Age, respectively. The Stone Age is also commonly divided into three distinct periods: the earliest and most primitive being the Paleolithic era; a transitional period with finer tools known as the Mesolithic era; and the final stage known as the Neolithic era. Neolithic peoples were the first to transition away from hunter-gatherer societies into the settled lifestyle of inhabiting towns and villages as agriculture became widespread. In the chronology of prehistory, the Neolithic era usually overlaps with the Chalcolithic ("Copper") era preceding the Bronze Age.

The Archaeology of the Americas uses different markers to assign five periods which have different dates in different areas; the oldest period is the similarly named Lithic stage.

== Historical significance ==
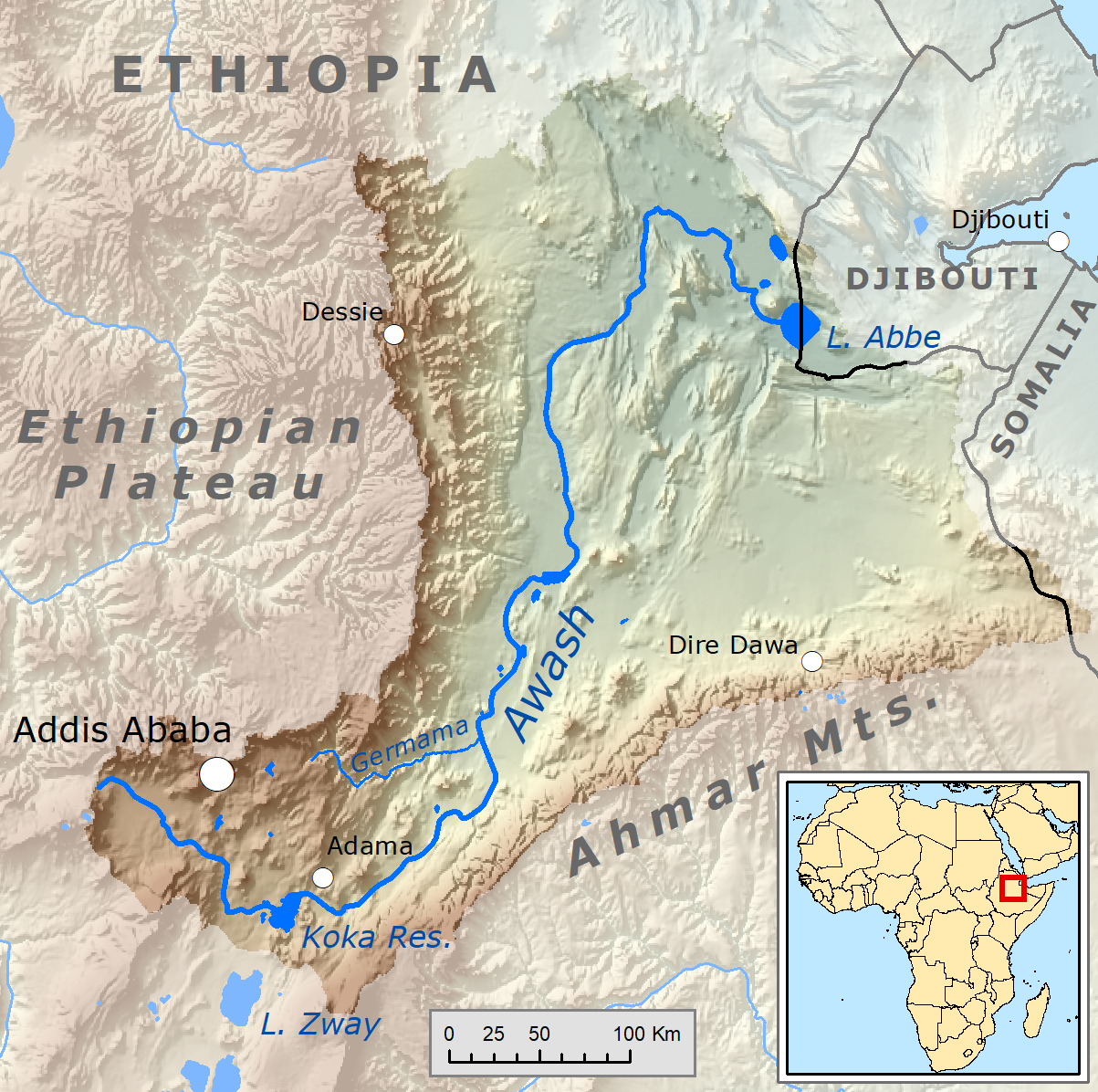
Modern Awash River, Ethiopia, descendant of the Palaeo-Awash, source of the sediments in which the oldest Stone Age tools have been found

Hominin timeline
← / Earlier apes; ← / Gorilla split; ← / Chimpanzee split; ← / Earliest bipedal; ← / Earliest sign of Ardipithecus; ← / Earliest sign of Australopithecus; ← / Earliest stone tools; ← / Earliest sign of Homo; ← / Dispersal beyond Africa; ← / Earliest fire / cooking; ← / Earliest rock art; ← / Earliest clothes; ← / Modern humans
(million years ago)

The Stone Age is contemporaneous with the evolution of the genus Homo, with the possible exception of the early Stone Age, when species prior to Homo may have manufactured tools. According to the age and location of the current evidence, the cradle of the genus is the East African Rift System, especially toward the north in Ethiopia, where it is bordered by grasslands. The closest relative among the other living primates, the genus Pan, represents a branch that continued on in the deep forest, where the primates evolved. The rift served as a conduit for movement into southern Africa and also north down the Nile into North Africa and through the continuation of the rift in the Levant to the vast grasslands of Asia.

Starting from about 4 million years ago (mya) a single biome established itself from South Africa through the rift, North Africa, and across Asia to modern China. This has been called "transcontinental 'savannahstan'" recently. Starting in the grasslands of the rift, Homo erectus, the predecessor of modern humans, found an ecological niche as a tool-maker and developed a dependence on it, becoming a "tool-equipped savanna dweller".

== Stone Age in archaeology ==
=== Beginning of the Stone Age ===
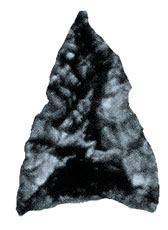
Obsidian projectile point

The oldest indirect evidence found of stone tool use is fossilised animal bones with tool marks; these are 3.4 million years old and were found in the Lower Awash Valley in Ethiopia. Archaeological discoveries in Kenya in 2015, identifying what may be the oldest evidence of hominin use of tools known to date, have indicated that Kenyanthropus platyops (a 3.2 to 3.5-million-year-old Pliocene hominin fossil discovered in Lake Turkana, Kenya, in 1999) may have been the earliest tool-users known.

The oldest stone tools were excavated from the site of Lomekwi 3 in West Turkana, northwestern Kenya, and date to 3.3 million years old. Prior to the discovery of these "Lomekwian" tools, the oldest known stone tools had been found at several sites at Gona, Ethiopia, on sediments of the paleo-Awash River, which serve to date them. All the tools come from the Busidama Formation, which lies above a disconformity, or missing layer, which would have been from 2.9 to 2.7 mya. The oldest sites discovered to contain tools are dated to 2.6–2.55 mya. One of the most striking circumstances about these sites is that they are from the Late Pliocene, where prior to their discovery tools were thought to have evolved only in the Pleistocene. Excavators at the locality point out that:

... the earliest stone tool makers were skilled flintknappers ... The possible reasons behind this seeming abrupt transition from the absence of stone tools to the presence thereof include ... gaps in the geological record.

The species that made the Pliocene tools remains unknown. Fragments of Australopithecus garhi, Australopithecus aethiopicus, and Homo, possibly Homo habilis, have been found in sites near the age of the Gona tools.

In July 2018, scientists reported the discovery in China of what may possibly be, if confirmed, the oldest known stone tools outside Africa, estimated at 2.12 million years old.

=== End of the Stone Age ===
Innovation in the technique of smelting ore is regarded as the end of the Stone Age and the beginning of the Bronze Age. The first highly significant metal manufactured was bronze, an alloy of copper and tin or arsenic, each of which was smelted separately. The transition from the Stone Age to the Bronze Age was a period during which modern people could smelt copper, but did not yet manufacture bronze, a time known as the Copper Age (or more technically the Chalcolithic or Eneolithic, both meaning 'copper–stone'). The Chalcolithic by convention is the initial period of the Bronze Age. The Bronze Age was followed by the Iron Age.

The transition out of the Stone Age occurred between 6000 and 2500 BC for much of humanity living in North Africa and Eurasia.

The first evidence of human metallurgy dates to between the 6th and 5th millennia BC in the archaeological sites of the Vinča culture, including Majdanpek, Jarmovac, Pločnik, Rudna Glava in modern-day Serbia.

Ötzi the Iceman, a mummy from about 3300 BC, carried with him a copper axe and a flint knife.

In some regions, such as Sub-Saharan Africa, the Stone Age was followed directly by the Iron Age. The Middle East and Southeast Asian regions progressed past Stone Age technology around 6000 BC. Europe, and the rest of Asia became post-Stone Age societies by about 4000 BC. The proto-Inca cultures of South America continued at a Stone Age level until around 2000 BC, when gold, copper, and silver made their entrance. The peoples of the Americas notably did not develop a widespread behavior of smelting bronze or iron after the Stone Age period, although the technology existed. Stone tool manufacture continued even after the Stone Age ended in a given area. In Europe and North America, millstones were in use until well into the 20th century, and still are in many parts of the world.

=== Concept of the Stone Age ===
The terms "Stone Age", "Bronze Age", and "Iron Age" are not intended to suggest that advancements and time periods in prehistory are only measured by the type of tool material, rather than, for example, social organization, food sources exploited, adaptation to climate, adoption of agriculture, cooking, settlement, and religion. Like pottery, the typology of the stone tools combined with the relative sequence of the types in various regions provide a chronological framework for the evolution of humanity and society. They serve as diagnostics of date, rather than characterizing the people or the society.

Lithic analysis is a major and specialised form of archaeological investigation. It involves the measurement of stone tools to determine their typology, function and technologies involved. It includes the scientific study of the lithic reduction of the raw materials and methods used to make the prehistoric artifacts that are discovered. Much of this study takes place in the laboratory in the presence of various specialists. In experimental archaeology, researchers attempt to create replica tools, to understand how they were made. Flintknappers are craftsmen who use sharp tools to reduce flintstone to flint tool.

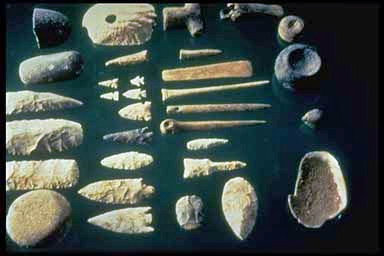
A variety of stone tools

In addition to lithic analysis, field prehistorians use a wide range of techniques derived from multiple fields. The work of archaeologists in determining the paleocontext and relative sequence of the layers is supplemented by the efforts of geologic specialists in identifying layers of rock developed or deposited over geologic time; of paleontological specialists in identifying bones and animals; of palynologists in discovering and identifying pollen, spores and plant species; of physicists and chemists in laboratories determining ages of materials by carbon-14, potassium-argon and other methods. The study of the Stone Age has never been limited to stone tools and archaeology, even though they are important forms of evidence. The chief focus of study has always been on the society and the living people who belonged to it.

Useful as it has been, the concept of the Stone Age has its limitations. The date range of this period is ambiguous, disputed, and variable, depending upon the region in question. While it is possible to speak of a general 'Stone Age' period for the whole of humanity, some groups never developed metal-smelting technology, and so remained in the so-called 'Stone Age' until they encountered technologically developed cultures. The term was innovated to describe the archaeological cultures of Europe. It may not always be the best in relation to regions such as some parts of the Indies and Oceania, where farmers or hunter-gatherers used stone for tools until European colonisation began.

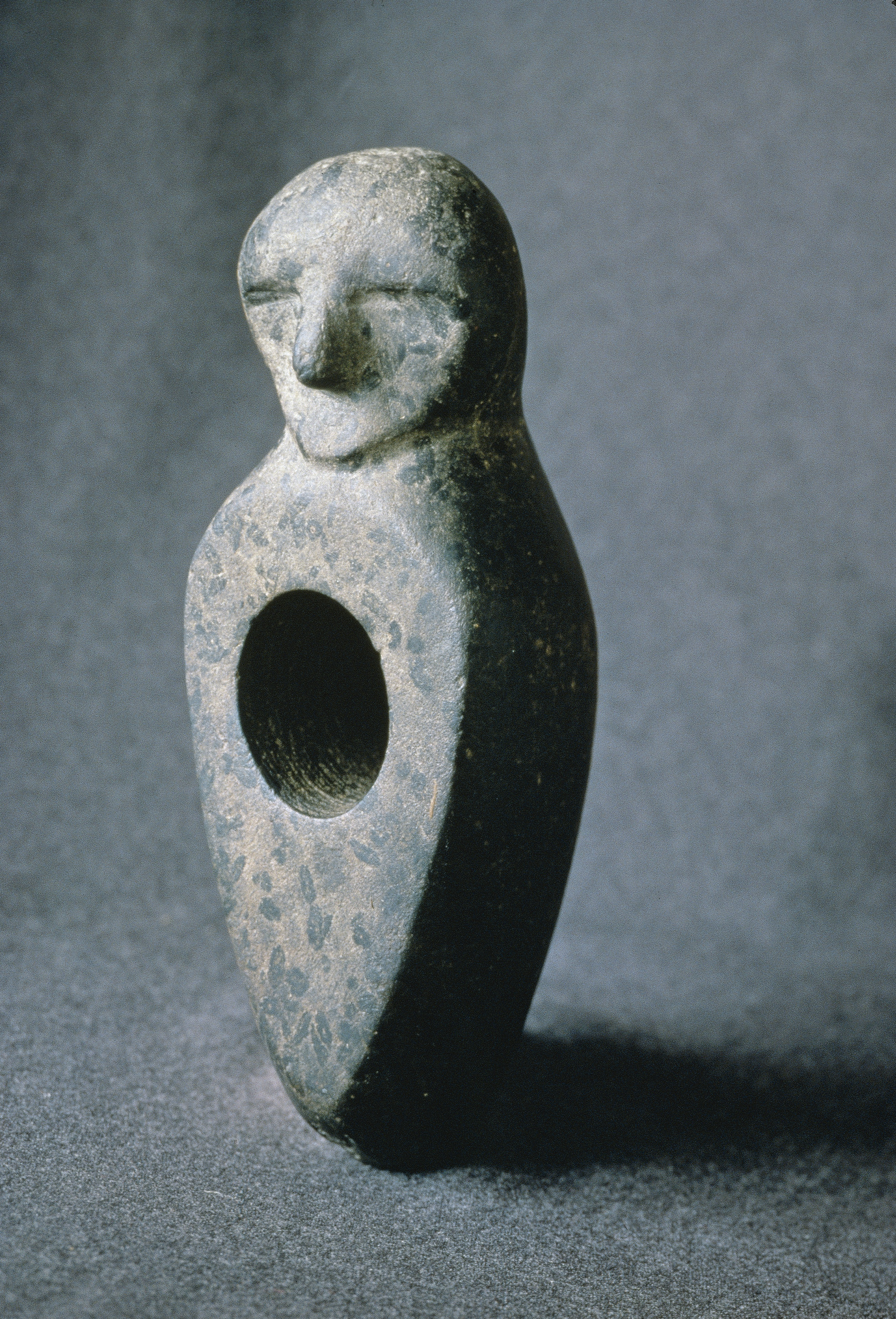
Stone Age hand axe engraved with human face found from Kiuruvesi, Finland

Archaeologists of the late 19th and early 20th centuries CE, who adapted the three-age system to their ideas, hoped to combine cultural anthropology and archaeology in such a way that a specific contemporaneous tribe could be used to illustrate the way of life and beliefs of the people exercising a particular Stone-Age technology. As a description of people living today, the term Stone Age is controversial. The Association of Social Anthropologists discourages this use, asserting:

To describe any living group as 'primitive' or 'Stone Age' inevitably implies that they are living representatives of some earlier stage of human development that the majority of humankind has left behind.

=== Three-stage system ===
In the 1920s, South African archaeologists organizing the stone tool collections of that country observed that they did not fit the newly detailed Three-Age System. In the words of J. Desmond Clark:

It was early realized that the threefold division of culture into Stone, Bronze and Iron Ages adopted in the nineteenth century for Europe had no validity in Africa outside the Nile valley.

Consequently, they proposed a new system for Africa, the Three-stage System. Clark regarded the Three-age System as valid for North Africa; in sub-Saharan Africa, the Three-stage System was best. In practice, the failure of African archaeologists either to keep this distinction in mind, or to explain which one they mean, contributes to the considerable equivocation already present in the literature. There are in effect two Stone Ages, one part of the Three-age and the other constituting the Three-stage. They refer to one and the same artifacts and the same technologies, but vary by locality and time.

The three-stage system was proposed in 1929 by Astley John Hilary Goodwin, a professional archaeologist, and Clarence van Riet Lowe, a civil engineer and amateur archaeologist, in an article titled "Stone Age Cultures of South Africa" in the journal Annals of the South African Museum. By then, the dates of the Early Stone Age, or Paleolithic, and Late Stone Age, or Neolithic (neo = new), were fairly solid and were regarded by Goodwin as absolute. He therefore proposed a relative chronology of periods with floating dates, to be called the Earlier and Later Stone Age. The Middle Stone Age would not change its name, but it would not mean Mesolithic.

The duo thus reinvented the Stone Age. In Sub-Saharan Africa, however, iron-working technologies were either invented independently or came across the Sahara from the north (see iron metallurgy in Africa). The Neolithic was characterized primarily by herding societies rather than large agricultural societies, and although there was copper metallurgy in Africa as well as bronze smelting, archaeologists do not currently recognize a separate Copper Age or Bronze Age. Moreover, the technologies included in those 'stages', as Goodwin called them, were not exactly the same. Since then, the original relative terms have become identified with the technologies of the Paleolithic and Mesolithic, so that they are no longer relative. Moreover, there has been a tendency to drop the comparative degree in favor of the positive: resulting in two sets of Early, Middle and Late Stone Ages of quite different content and chronologies.

By voluntary agreement, archaeologists respect the decisions of the Pan-African Congress on Prehistory, which meets every four years to resolve the archaeological business brought before it. Delegates are actually international; the organization takes its name from the topic. Louis Leakey hosted the first one in Nairobi in 1947. It adopted Goodwin and Lowe's 3-stage system at that time, the stages to be called Early, Middle and Later.

=== Problem of the transitions ===
The problem of the transitions in archaeology is a branch of the general philosophic continuity problem, which examines how discrete objects of any sort that are contiguous in any way can be presumed to have a relationship of any sort. In archaeology, the relationship is one of causality. If Period B can be presumed to descend from Period A, there must be a boundary between A and B, the A–B boundary. The problem is in the nature of this boundary. If there is no distinct boundary, then the population of A suddenly stopped using the customs characteristic of A and suddenly started using those of B, an unlikely scenario in the process of evolution. More realistically, a distinct border period, the A/B transition, existed, in which the customs of A were gradually dropped and those of B acquired. If transitions do not exist, then there is no proof of any continuity between A and B.

The Stone Age of Europe is characteristically in deficit of known transitions. The 19th and early 20th-century innovators of the modern three-age system recognized the problem of the initial transition, the "gap" between the Paleolithic and the Neolithic. Louis Leakey provided something of an answer by proving that man evolved in Africa. The Stone Age must have begun there to be carried repeatedly to Europe by migrant populations. The different phases of the Stone Age thus could appear there without transitions. The burden on African archaeologists became all the greater, because now they must find the missing transitions in Africa. The problem is difficult and ongoing.

After its adoption by the First Pan African Congress in 1947, the Three-Stage Chronology was amended by the Third Congress in 1955 to include a First Intermediate Period between Early and Middle, to encompass the Fauresmith and Sangoan technologies, and the Second Intermediate Period between Middle and Later, to encompass the Magosian technology and others. The chronologic basis for the definition was entirely relative. With the arrival of scientific means of finding an absolute chronology, the two intermediates turned out to be will-of-the-wisps. They were in fact Middle and Lower Paleolithic. Fauresmith is now considered to be a facies of Acheulean, while Sangoan is a facies of Lupemban. Magosian is "an artificial mix of two different periods".

Once seriously questioned, the intermediates did not wait for the next Pan African Congress two years hence, but were officially rejected in 1965 (again on an advisory basis) by Burg Wartenstein Conference #29, Systematic Investigation of the African Later Tertiary and Quaternary, a conference in anthropology held by the Wenner-Gren Foundation, at Burg Wartenstein Castle, which it then owned in Austria, attended by the same scholars that attended the Pan African Congress, including Louis Leakey and Mary Leakey, who was delivering a pilot presentation of her typological analysis of Early Stone Age tools, to be included in her 1971 contribution to Olduvai Gorge, "Excavations in Beds I and II, 1960–1963."

However, although the intermediate periods were gone, the search for the transitions continued.

== Chronology ==
Time series plot of temperature over the previous 5 million years

In 1859 Jens Jacob Worsaae first proposed a division of the Stone Age into older and younger parts based on his work with Danish kitchen middens that began in 1851. In the subsequent decades this simple distinction developed into the archaeological periods of today. The major subdivisions of the Three-age Stone Age cross two epoch boundaries on the geologic time scale:

- The geologic Pliocene–Pleistocene boundary (highly glaciated climate)
  - The Paleolithic period of archaeology
- The geologic Pleistocene–Holocene boundary (modern climate)
  - Mesolithic or Epipaleolithic period of archaeology
  - Neolithic period of archaeology

The succession of these phases varies enormously from one region (and culture) to another.

=== Three-age chronology ===
The Paleolithic or Palaeolithic (from Greek: παλαιός, palaios, "old"; and λίθος, lithos, "stone" lit. "old stone", coined by archaeologist John Lubbock and published in 1865) is the earliest division of the Stone Age. It covers the greatest portion of humanity's time (roughly 99% of "human technological history", where "human" and "humanity" are interpreted to mean the genus Homo), extending from 2.5 or 2.6 million years ago, with the first documented use of stone tools by hominins such as Homo habilis, to the end of the Pleistocene around 10,000 BC. The Paleolithic era ended with the Mesolithic, or in areas with an early Neolithisation, the Epipaleolithic.

==== Lower Paleolithic ====
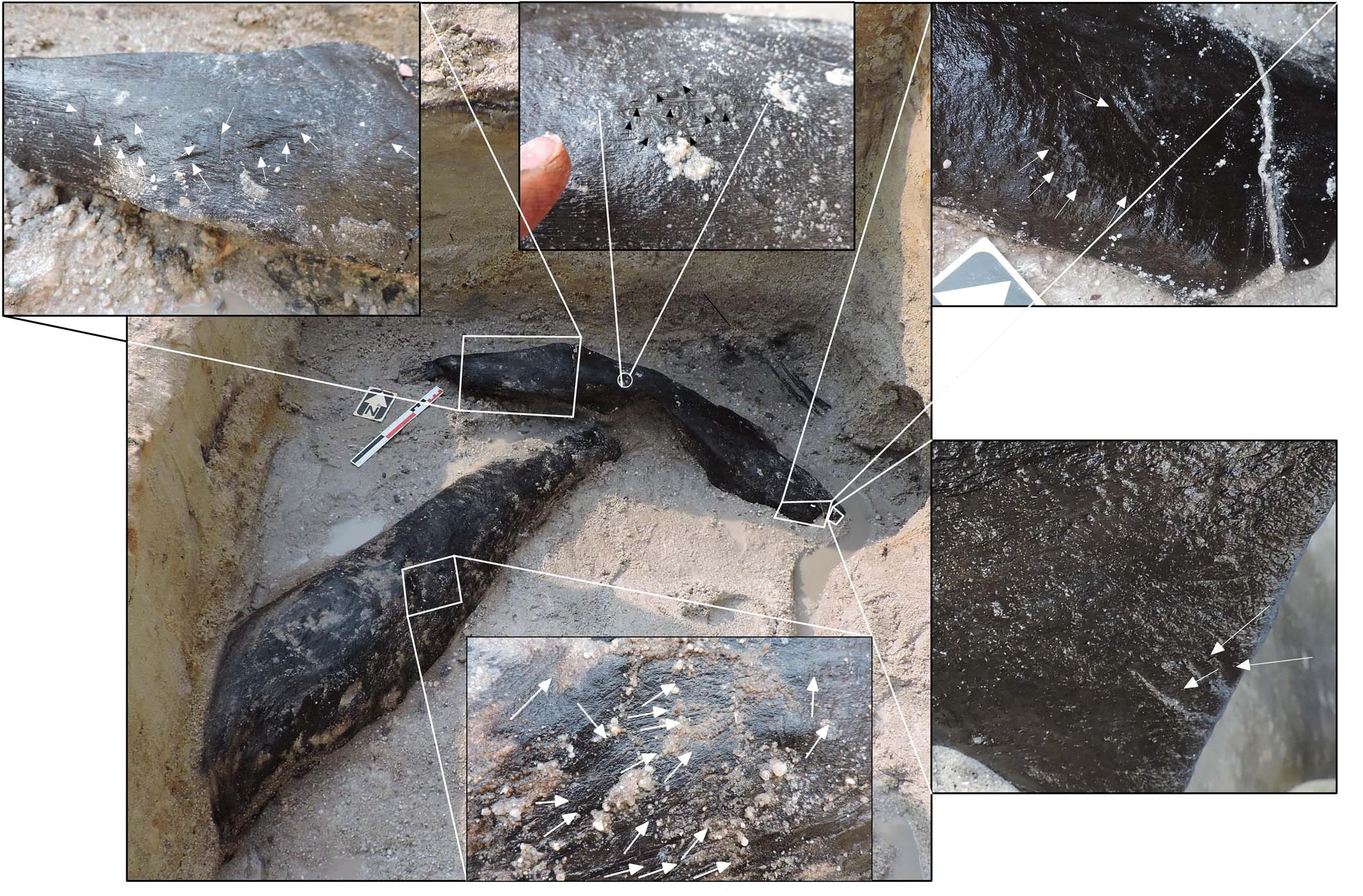
Kalambo structure

At sites dating from the Lower Paleolithic Period (about 2,500,000 to 200,000 years ago), simple pebble tools have been found in association with the remains of what may have been the earliest human ancestors. A somewhat more sophisticated Lower Paleolithic tradition, known as the Chopper chopping tool industry, is widely distributed in the Eastern Hemisphere. This tradition is thought to have been the work of the hominin species named Homo erectus. Although no such fossil tools have yet been found, it is believed that H. erectus probably made tools of wood and bone as well as stone. About 700,000 years ago, a new Lower Paleolithic tool, the hand axe, appeared. The earliest European hand axes are assigned to the Abbevillian industry, which developed in northern France in the valley of the Somme River; a later, more refined hand-axe tradition is seen in the Acheulian industry, evidence of which has been found in Europe, Africa, the Middle East, and Asia. Some of the earliest known hand axes were found at Olduvai Gorge (Tanzania) in association with remains of H. erectus. Alongside the hand-axe tradition, there developed a distinct and very different stone-tool industry, based on flakes of stone: special tools were made from worked (carefully shaped) flakes of flint. In Europe, the Clactonian industry is one example of a flake tradition. The early flake industries probably contributed to the development of the Middle Paleolithic flake tools of the Mousterian industry, which is associated with the remains of Neanderthal man.

===== Oldowan in Africa =====
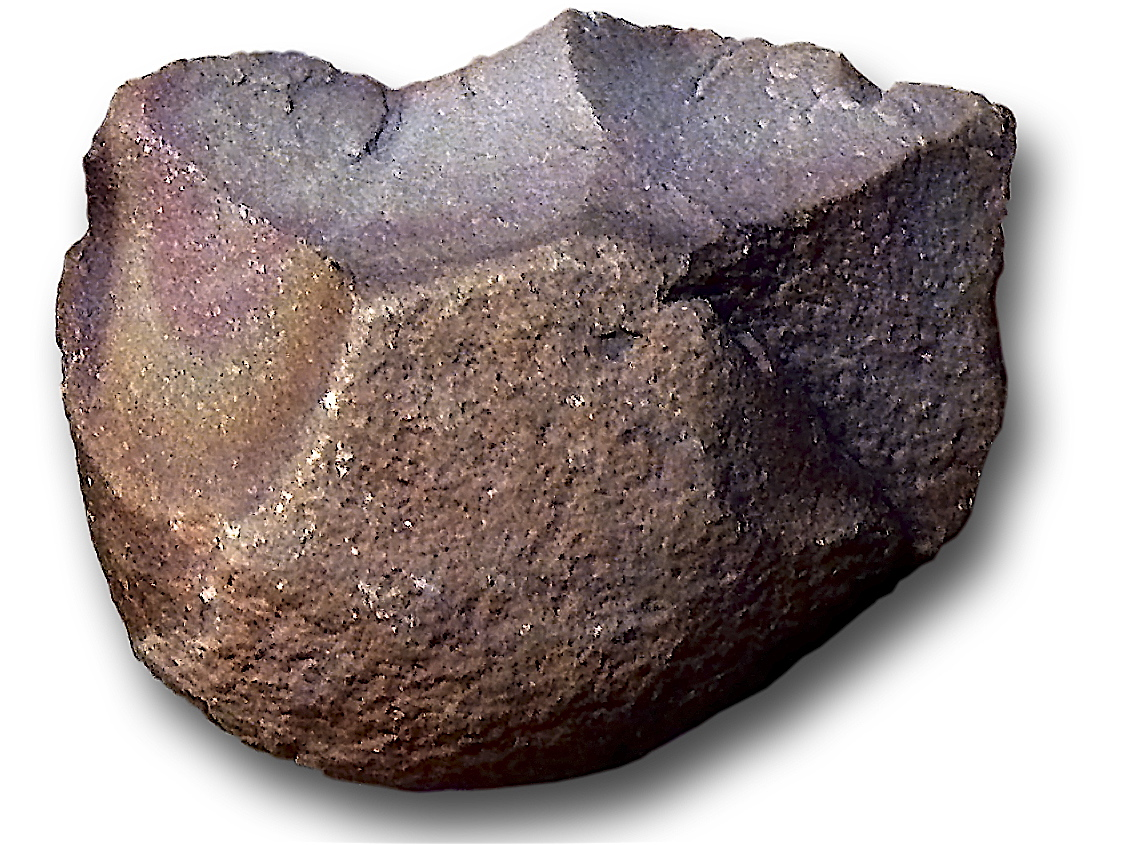
A Mode 1, or Oldowan, stone tool from the western Sahara

The earliest documented stone tools have been found in eastern Africa, manufacturers unknown, at the 3.3 million-year-old site of Lomekwi 3 in Kenya. Better known are the later tools belonging to an industry known as Oldowan, after the type site of Olduvai Gorge in Tanzania.

The tools were formed by knocking pieces off a river pebble, or stones like it, with a hammerstone to obtain large and small pieces with one or more sharp edges. Typically, but not necessarily, small pieces are detached from a larger piece, in which case the larger piece may be called the core and the smaller pieces the flakes. The prevalent usage, however, is to call all the results flakes, which can be confusing. A split in half is called bipolar flaking.

Consequently, the method is often called "core-and-flake". More recently, the tradition has been called "small flake" since the flakes were small compared to subsequent Acheulean tools.

The essence of the Oldowan is the making and often immediate use of small flakes.

Another naming scheme is "Pebble Core Technology (PBC)":

Pebble cores are ... artifacts that have been shaped by varying amounts of hard-hammer percussion.

Various refinements in the shape have been called choppers, discoids, polyhedrons, subspheroid, etc. To date no reasons for the variants have been ascertained:

From a functional standpoint, pebble cores seem designed for no specific purpose.

However, they would not have been manufactured for no purpose:

Pebble cores can be useful in many cutting, scraping or chopping tasks, but ... they are not particularly more efficient in such tasks than a sharp-edged rock.

The whole point of their utility is that each is a "sharp-edged rock" in locations where nature has not provided any. There is additional evidence that Oldowan, or Mode 1, tools were used in "percussion technology"; that is, they were designed to be gripped at the blunt end and strike something with the edge, from which use they were given the name of choppers. Modern science has been able to detect mammalian blood cells on Mode 1 tools at Sterkfontein, Member 5 East, in South Africa. As the blood must have come from a fresh kill, the tool users are likely to have done the killing and used the tools for butchering. Plant residues bonded to the silicon of some tools confirm the use to chop plants.

Although the exact species authoring the tools remains unknown, Mode 1 tools in Africa were manufactured and used predominantly by Homo habilis. They cannot be said to have developed these tools or to have contributed the tradition to technology. They continued a tradition of yet unknown origin. As chimpanzees sometimes naturally use percussion to extract or prepare food in the wild, and may use either unmodified stones or stones that they have split, creating an Oldowan tool, the tradition may well be far older than its current record.

Towards the end of Oldowan in Africa the new species Homo erectus appeared over the range of Homo habilis. The earliest "unambiguous" evidence is a whole cranium, KNM-ER 3733 (a find identifier) from Koobi Fora in Kenya, dated to 1.78 mya. An early skull fragment, KNM-ER 2598, dated to 1.9 mya, is considered a good candidate also. Transitions in paleoanthropology are always hard to find, if not impossible, but based on the "long-legged" limb morphology shared by H. habilis and H. rudolfensis in East Africa, an evolution from one of those two has been suggested.

The most immediate cause of the new adjustments appears to have been an increasing aridity in the region and consequent contraction of parkland savanna, interspersed with trees and groves, in favor of open grassland, dated 1.8–1.7 mya. During that transitional period the percentage of grazers among the fossil species increased from around 15–25% to 45%, dispersing the food supply and requiring a facility among the hunters to travel longer distances comfortably, which H. erectus obviously had. The ultimate proof is the "dispersal" of H. erectus "across much of Africa and Asia, substantially before the development of the Mode 2 technology and use of fire". H. erectus carried Mode 1 tools over Eurasia.

According to the current evidence (which may change at any time) Mode 1 tools are documented from about 2.6 mya to about 1.5 mya in Africa, and to 0.5 mya outside of it. The genus Homo is known from H. habilis and H. rudolfensis from 2.3 to 2.0 mya, with the latest habilis being an upper jaw from Koobi Fora, Kenya, from 1.4 mya. H. erectus is dated 1.8–0.6 mya.

According to this chronology Mode 1 was inherited by Homo from unknown Hominans, probably Australopithecus and Paranthropus, who must have continued on with Mode 1 and then with Mode 2 until their extinction no later than 1.1 mya. Meanwhile, living contemporaneously in the same regions H. habilis inherited the tools around 2.3 mya. At about 1.9 mya H. erectus came on stage and lived contemporaneously with the others. Mode 1 was now being shared by a number of Hominans over the same ranges, presumably subsisting in different niches, but the archaeology is not precise enough to say which.

===== Oldowan out of Africa =====
Tools of the Oldowan tradition first came to archaeological attention in Europe, where, being intrusive and not well defined, compared to the Acheulean, they were puzzling to archaeologists. The mystery would be elucidated by African archaeology at Olduvai, but meanwhile, in the early 20th century, the term "Pre-Acheulean" came into use in climatology. C. E. P. Brooks, a British climatologist working in the United States, used the term to describe a "chalky boulder clay" underlying a layer of gravel at Hoxne, central England, where Acheulean tools had been found. Whether any tools would be found in it and what type was not known. Hugo Obermaier, a contemporary German archaeologist working in Spain, stated:

Unfortunately, the stage of human industry which corresponds to these deposits cannot be positively identified. All we can say is that it is pre-Acheulean.

This uncertainty was clarified by the subsequent excavations at Olduvai; nevertheless, the term is still in use for pre-Acheulean contexts, mainly across Eurasia, that are yet unspecified or uncertain but with the understanding that they are or will turn out to be pebble-tool.

There are ample associations of Mode 2 with H. erectus in Eurasia. H. erectus – Mode 1 associations are scantier but they do exist, especially in the Far East. One strong piece of evidence prevents the conclusion that only H. erectus reached Eurasia: at Yiron, Israel, Mode 1 tools have been found dating to 2.4 mya, about 0.5 my earlier than the known H. erectus finds. If the date is correct, either another Hominan preceded H. erectus out of Africa or the earliest H. erectus has yet to be found.

After the initial appearance at Gona in Ethiopia at 2.7 mya, pebble tools date from 2.0 mya at Sterkfontein, Member 5, South Africa, and from 1.8 mya at El Kherba, Algeria, North Africa. The manufacturers had already left pebble tools at Yiron, Israel, at 2.4 mya, Riwat, Pakistan, at 2.0 mya, and Renzidong, South China, at over 2 mya. The identification of a fossil skull at Mojokerta, Pernung Peninsula on Java, dated to 1.8 mya, as H. erectus, suggests that the African finds are not the earliest to be found in Africa, or that, in fact, erectus did not originate in Africa after all but on the plains of Asia. The outcome of the issue waits for more substantial evidence. Erectus was found also at Dmanisi, Georgia, from 1.75 mya in association with pebble tools.

Pebble tools are found the latest first in southern Europe and then in northern Europe. They begin in the open areas of Italy and Spain, the earliest dated to 1.6 mya at Pirro Nord, Italy. The mountains of Italy are rising at a rapid rate in the framework of geologic time; at 1.6 mya they were lower and covered with grassland (as much of the highlands still are). Europe was otherwise mountainous and covered over with dense forest, a formidable terrain for warm-weather savanna dwellers. Similarly there is no evidence that the Mediterranean was passable at Gibraltar or anywhere else to H. erectus or earlier hominins. They might have reached Italy and Spain along the coasts.

In northern Europe, pebble tools are found earliest at Happisburgh, United Kingdom, from 0.8 mya. The last traces are from Kent's Cavern, dated 0.5 mya. By that time H. erectus is regarded as having been extinct; however, a more modern version apparently had evolved, Homo heidelbergensis, who must have inherited the tools. He also explains the last of the Acheulean in Germany at 0.4 mya.

In the late 19th and early 20th centuries, archaeologists worked on the assumption that a succession of hominins and cultures prevailed, that one replaced another. Today the presence of multiple hominins living contemporaneously near each other for long periods is accepted as proven true; moreover, by the time the previously assumed "earliest" culture arrived in northern Europe, the rest of Africa and Eurasia had progressed to the Middle and Upper Palaeolithic, so that across the earth all three were for a time contemporaneous. In any given region there was a progression from Oldowan to Acheulean, Lower to Upper, no doubt.

===== Acheulean in Africa =====
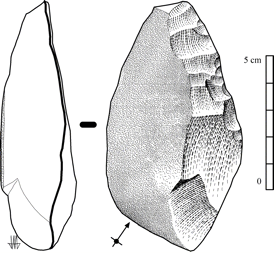
An Acheulean tool, not worked over the entire surface

The end of Oldowan in Africa was brought on by the appearance of Acheulean, or Mode 2, stone tools. The earliest known instances are in the 1.7–1.6 mya layer at Kokiselei, West Turkana, Kenya. At Sterkfontein, South Africa, they are in Member 5 West, 1.7–1.4 mya. The 1.7 is a fairly certain, fairly standard date. Mode 2 is often found in association with H. erectus. It makes sense that the most advanced tools should have been innovated by the most advanced hominin; consequently, they are typically given credit for the innovation.

A Mode 2 tool is a biface consisting of two concave surfaces intersecting to form a cutting edge all the way around, except in the case of tools intended to feature a point. More work and planning go into the manufacture of a Mode 2 tool. The manufacturer hits a slab off a larger rock to use as a blank. Then large flakes are struck off the blank and worked into bifaces by hard-hammer percussion on an anvil stone. Finally the edge is retouched: small flakes are hit off with a bone or wood soft hammer to sharpen or resharpen it. The core can be either the blank or another flake. Blanks are ported for manufacturing supply in places where nature has provided no suitable stone.

Although most Mode 2 tools are easily distinguished from Mode 1, there is a close similarity of some Oldowan and some Acheulean, which can lead to confusion. Some Oldowan tools are more carefully prepared to form a more regular edge. One distinguishing criterion is the size of the flakes. In contrast to the Oldowan "small flake" tradition, Acheulean is "large flake": "The primary technological distinction remaining between Oldowan and the Acheulean is the preference for large flakes (>10 cm) as blanks for making large cutting tools (handaxes and cleavers) in the Acheulean." "Large Cutting Tool" (LCT) has become part of the standard terminology as well.

In North Africa, the presence of Mode 2 remains a mystery, as the oldest finds are from Thomas Quarry in Morocco at 0.9 mya. Archaeological attention, however, shifts to the Jordan Rift Valley, an extension of the East African Rift Valley (the east bank of the Jordan is slowly sliding northward as East Africa is thrust away from Africa). Evidence of use of the Nile Valley is in deficit, but Hominans could easily have reached the palaeo-Jordan River from Ethiopia along the shores of the Red Sea, one side or the other. A crossing would not have been necessary, but it is more likely there than over a theoretical but unproven land bridge through either Gibraltar or Sicily.

Meanwhile, Acheulean went on in Africa past the 1.0 mya mark and also past the extinction of H. erectus there. The last Acheulean in East Africa is at Olorgesailie, Kenya, dated to about 0.9 mya. Its owner was still H. erectus, but in South Africa, Acheulean at Elandsfontein, 1.0–0.6 mya, is associated with Saldanha man, classified as H. heidelbergensis, a more advanced, but not yet modern, descendant most likely of H. erectus. The Thoman Quarry Hominans in Morocco similarly are most likely Homo rhodesiensis, in the same evolutionary status as H. heidelbergensis.

===== Acheulean out of Africa =====
Mode 2 is first known out of Africa at 'Ubeidiya, Israel, a site now on the Jordan River, then frequented over the long term (hundreds of thousands of years) by Homo on the shore of a variable-level palaeo-lake, long since vanished. The geology was created by successive "transgression and regression" of the lake resulting in four cycles of layers. The tools are located in the first two, Cycles Li (Limnic Inferior) and Fi (Fluviatile Inferior), but mostly in Fi. The cycles represent different ecologies and therefore different cross-sections of fauna, which makes it possible to date them. They appear to be the same faunal assemblages as the Ferenta Faunal Unit in Italy, known from excavations at Selvella and Pieterfitta, dated to 1.6–1.2 mya.

At 'Ubeidiya the marks on the bones of the animal species found there indicate that the manufacturers of the tools butchered the kills of large predators, an activity that has been termed "scavenging". There are no living floors, nor did they process bones to obtain the marrow. These activities cannot be understood therefore as the only or even the typical economic activity of Hominans. Their interests were selective: they were primarily harvesting the meat of Cervids, which is estimated to have been available without spoiling for up to four days after the kill.

The majority of the animals at the site were of "Palaearctic biogeographic origin". However, these overlapped in range on 30–60% of "African biogeographic origin". The biome was Mediterranean, not savanna. The animals were not passing through; there was simply an overlap of normal ranges. Of the Hominans, H. erectus left several cranial fragments. Teeth of undetermined species may have been H. ergaster. The tools are classified as "Lower Acheulean" and "Developed Oldowan". The latter is a disputed classification created by Mary Leakey to describe an Acheulean-like tradition in Bed II at Olduvai. It is dated 1.53–1.27 mya. The date of the tools therefore probably does not exceed 1.5 mya; 1.4 is often given as a date. This chronology, which is definitely later than in Kenya, supports the "out of Africa" hypothesis for Acheulean, if not for the Hominans.

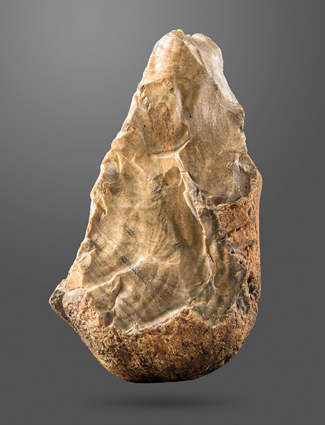
Biface (trihedral) from Amar Merdeg at Zagros foothill, Ilam, National Museum of Iran

From Southwest Asia, as the Levant is now called, the Acheulean extended itself more slowly eastward, arriving at Isampur, India, about 1.2 mya. It does not appear in China and Korea until after 1mya and not at all in Indonesia. There is a discernible boundary marking the furthest extent of the Acheulean eastward before 1 mya, called the Movius Line, after its proposer, Hallam L. Movius. On the east side of the line the small flake tradition continues, but the tools are additionally worked Mode 1, with flaking down the sides. In Athirampakkam at Chennai in Tamil Nadu the Acheulean age started at 1.51 mya and it is also prior than North India and Europe.

The cause of the Movius Line remains speculative, whether it represents a real change in technology or a limitation of archaeology, but after 1 mya evidence not available to Movius indicates the prevalence of Acheulean. For example, the Acheulean site at Bose, China, is dated 0.803±3K mya. The authors of this chronologically later East Asian Acheulean remain unknown, as does whether it evolved in the region or was brought in.

There is no named boundary line between Mode 1 and Mode 2 on the west; nevertheless, Mode 2 is equally late in Europe as it is in the Far East. The earliest comes from a rock shelter at Estrecho de Quípar in Spain, dated to greater than 0.9 mya. Teeth from an undetermined Hominan were found there also. The last Mode 2 in Southern Europe is from a deposit at Fontana Ranuccio near Anagni in Italy dated to 0.45 mya, which is generally linked to Homo cepranensis, a "late variant of H. erectus", a fragment of whose skull was found at Ceprano nearby, dated 0.46 mya.

==== Middle Paleolithic ====
This period is best known as the era during which the Neanderthals lived in Europe and the Near East (c. 300,000–28,000 years ago). Their technology is mainly the Mousterian, but Neanderthal physical characteristics have been found also in ambiguous association with the more recent Châtelperronian archaeological culture in Western Europe and several local industries like the Szeletian in Eastern Europe/Eurasia. There is no evidence for Neanderthals in Africa, Australia or the Americas.

Neanderthals nursed their elderly and practised ritual burial indicating an organised society. The earliest evidence (Mungo Man) of settlement in Australia dates to around 40,000 years ago when modern humans likely crossed from Asia by island-hopping. Evidence for symbolic behavior such as body ornamentation and burial is ambiguous for the Middle Paleolithic and still subject to debate. The Bhimbetka rock shelters exhibit the earliest traces of human life in India, some of which are approximately 30,000 years old.

==== Upper Paleolithic ====
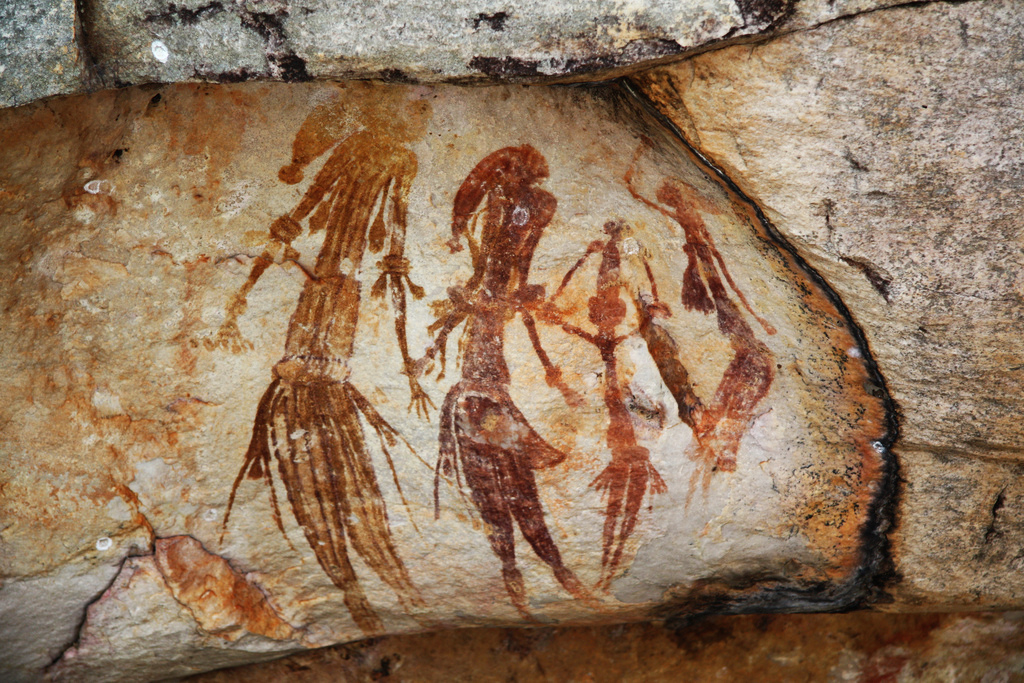
Gwion Gwion rock paintings found in the north-west Kimberley region of Western Australia

From 50,000 to 10,000 years ago in Europe, the Upper Paleolithic ends with the end of the Pleistocene and onset of the Holocene era (the end of the Last Glacial Period). Modern humans spread out further across the Earth during the period known as the Upper Paleolithic.

The Upper Paleolithic is marked by a relatively rapid succession of often complex stone artifact technologies and a large increase in the creation of art and personal ornaments. During period between 35 and 10 kya evolved: from 38 to 30 kya Châtelperronian, 40–28 Aurignacian, 28–22 Gravettian, 22–17 Solutrean, and 18–10 Magdalenian. All of these industries except the Châtelperronian are associated with anatomically modern humans. Authorship of the Châtelperronian is still the subject of much debate.

Most scholars date the arrival of humans in Australia at 40,000 to 50,000 years ago, with a possible range of up to 125,000 years ago. The earliest anatomically modern human remains found in Australia (and outside of Africa) are those of Mungo Man; they have been dated at 42,000 years old.

The Americas were colonised via the Bering land bridge which was exposed during this period by lower sea levels. These people are called the Paleo-Indians, and the earliest accepted dates are those of the Clovis culture sites, some 13,500 years ago. Globally, societies were hunter-gatherers but evidence of regional identities begins to appear in the wide variety of stone tool types being developed to suit very different environments.

==== Epipaleolithic/Mesolithic ====
The period starting from the end of the last ice age, 10,000 years ago, to around 6,000 years ago was characterized by rising sea levels and a need to adapt to a changing environment and find new food sources. The development of Mode 5 (microlith) tools began in response to these changes. They were derived from the previous Paleolithic tools, hence the term Epipaleolithic, or were intermediate between the Paleolithic and the Neolithic, hence the term Mesolithic (Middle Stone Age), used for parts of Eurasia, but not outside it. The choice of a word depends on exact circumstances and the inclination of the archaeologists excavating the site. Microliths were used in the manufacture of more efficient composite tools, resulting in an intensification of hunting and fishing and with increasing social activity the development of more complex settlements, such as Lepenski Vir. Domestication of the dog as a hunting companion probably dates to this period.

The earliest known battle occurred during the Mesolithic period at a site in Egypt known as Cemetery 117.

==== Neolithic ====
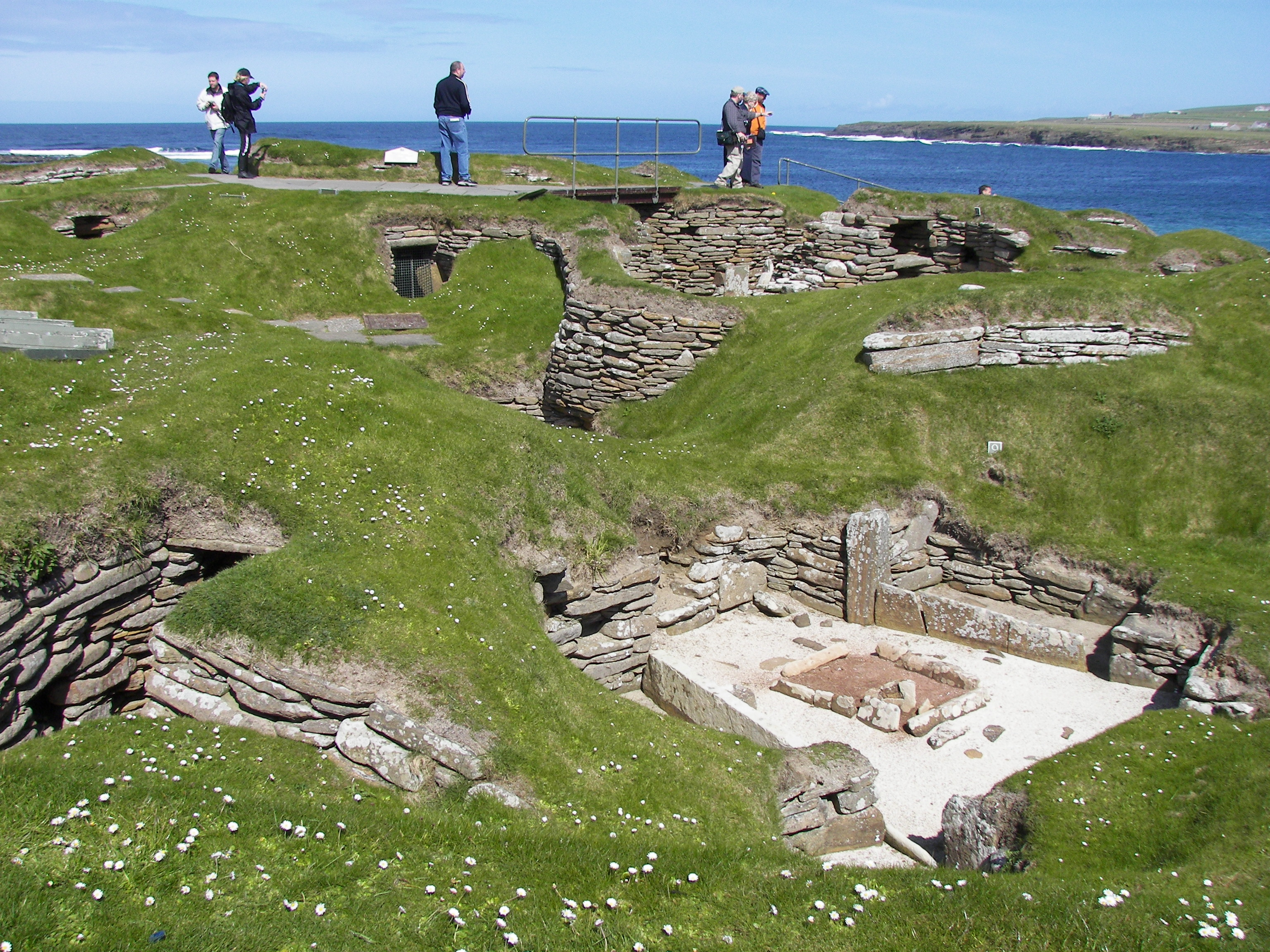
Skara Brae, Scotland: Europe's most complete Neolithic village

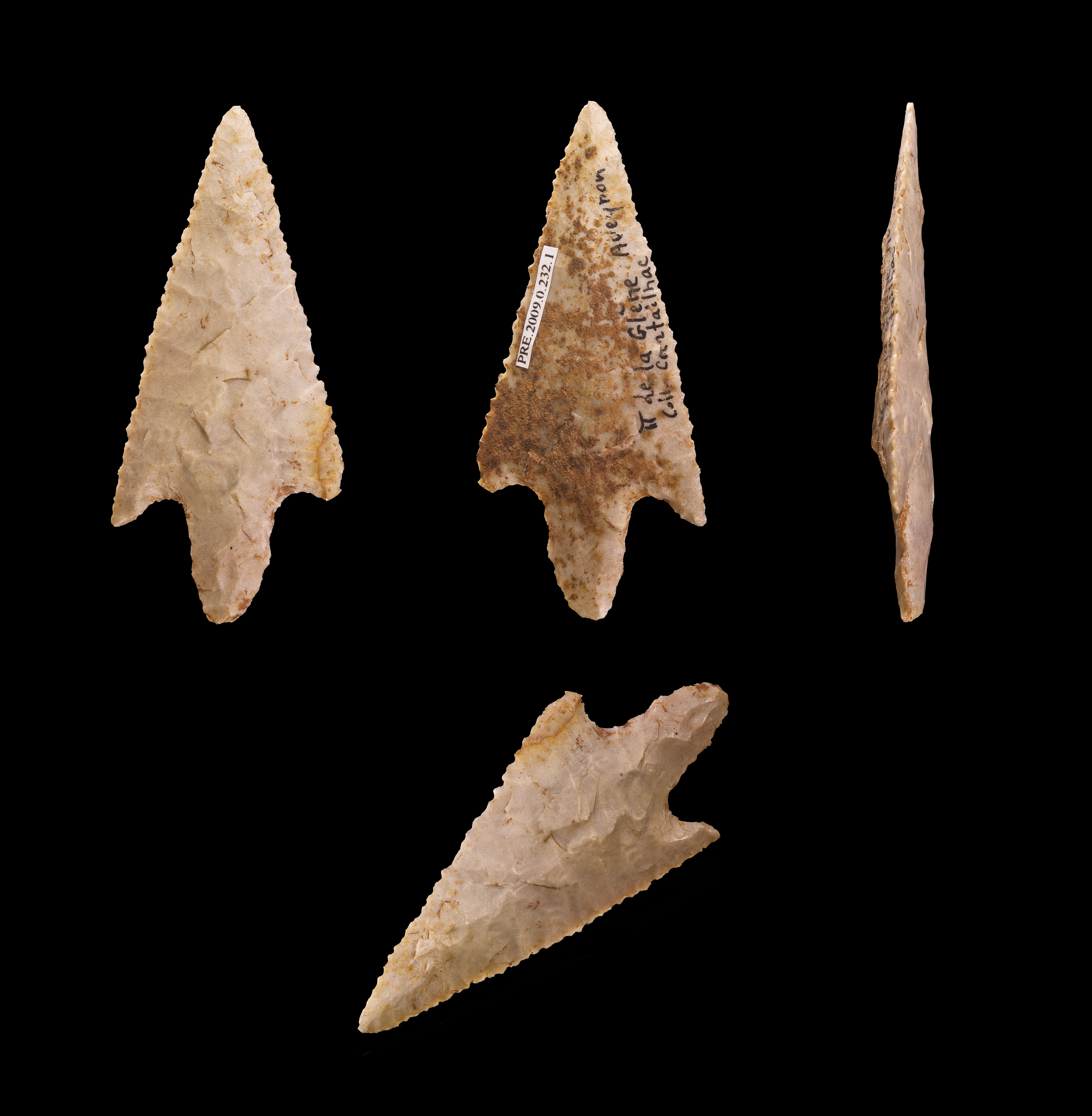
Different views of one arrowhead from chert, 3300 to 2400 BC, Saint-Léons, France

The Neolithic, or New Stone Age, was approximately characterized by the adoption of agriculture. The shift from food gathering to food producing, in itself one of the most revolutionary changes in human history, was accompanied by the so-called Neolithic Revolution: the development of pottery, polished stone tools, and construction of more complex, larger settlements such as Göbekli Tepe and Çatalhöyük. Some of these features began in certain localities even earlier, in the transitional Mesolithic. The first Neolithic cultures started around 7000 BC in the Fertile Crescent and spread concentrically to other areas of the world; however, the Near East was probably not the only nucleus of agriculture, the cultivation of maize in Meso-America and of rice in the Far East being others.

Due to the increased need to harvest and process plants, ground stone and polished stone artifacts became much more widespread, including tools for grinding, cutting, and chopping. Skara Brae, located in Orkney, Scotland, is one of Europe's best examples of a Neolithic village. The community contains stone beds, shelves and even an indoor toilet linked to a stream. The first large-scale constructions were built, including settlement towers and walls, e.g., Jericho (Tell es-Sultan) and ceremonial sites, e.g. Stonehenge. The Ġgantija temples of Gozo in the Maltese archipelago are the oldest surviving free-standing structures in the world, erected c. 3600–2500 BC. The earliest evidence for established trade exists in the Neolithic with newly settled people importing exotic goods over distances of many hundreds of miles.

These facts show that there were sufficient resources and co-operation to enable large groups to work on these projects. To what extent this was a basis for the development of elites and social hierarchies is a matter of ongoing debate. Although some late Neolithic societies formed complex stratified chiefdoms similar to Polynesian societies such as the Ancient Hawaiians, based on the societies of modern tribesmen at an equivalent technological level, most Neolithic societies were relatively simple and egalitarian. A comparison of art in the two ages leads some theorists to conclude that Neolithic cultures were noticeably more hierarchical than the Paleolithic cultures that preceded them.

=== African chronology ===
==== Early Stone Age (ESA) ====
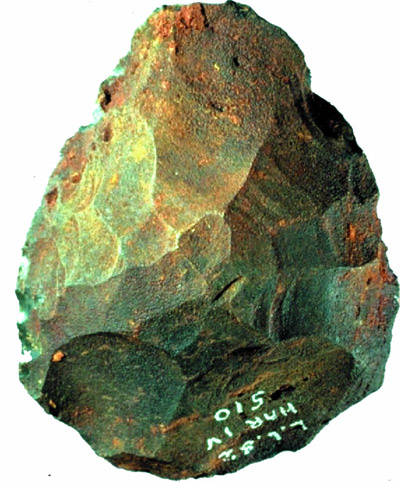
Acheulean biface from Lake Langano area, Ethiopia

The Early Stone Age in Africa is not to be identified with "Old Stone Age", a translation of Paleolithic, or with Paleolithic, or with the "Earlier Stone Age" that originally meant what became the Paleolithic and Mesolithic. In the initial decades of its definition by the Pan-African Congress of Prehistory, it was parallel in Africa to the Upper and Middle Paleolithic. However, since then Radiocarbon dating has shown that the Middle Stone Age is in fact contemporaneous with the Middle Paleolithic. The Early Stone Age therefore is contemporaneous with the Lower Paleolithic and happens to include the same main technologies, Oldowan and Acheulean, which produced Mode 1 and Mode 2 stone tools respectively. A distinct regional term is warranted, however, by the location and chronology of the sites and the exact typology.

==== Middle Stone Age (MSA) ====
The Middle Stone Age was a period of African prehistory between Early Stone Age and Late Stone Age. It began around 300,000 years ago and ended around 50,000 years ago. It is considered as an equivalent of European Middle Paleolithic. It is associated with anatomically modern or almost modern Homo sapiens. Early physical evidence comes from Omo and Herto, both in Ethiopia and dated respectively at c. 195 ka and at c. 160 ka.

==== Later Stone Age (LSA) ====
The Later Stone Age (LSA, sometimes also called the Late Stone Age) refers to a period in African prehistory. Its beginnings are roughly contemporaneous with the European Upper Paleolithic. It lasts until historical times and this includes cultures corresponding to Mesolithic and Neolithic in other regions.

== Material culture ==
=== Tools ===
Stone tools were made from a variety of stones. For example, flint and chert were shaped (or chipped) for use as cutting tools and weapons, while basalt and sandstone were used for ground stone tools, such as quern-stones. Wood, bone, shell, antler (deer) and other materials were widely used, as well. During the most recent part of the period, sediments (such as clay) were used to make pottery. Agriculture was developed and certain animals were domesticated as well.

Some species of non-primates are able to use stone tools, such as the sea otter, which breaks abalone shells with them. Primates can both use and manufacture stone tools. This combination of abilities is more marked in apes and humans, but only humans, or more generally hominins, depend on tool use for survival. The key anatomical and behavioral features required for tool manufacture, which are possessed only by hominins, are the larger thumb and the ability to hold by means of an assortment of grips.

=== Food and drink ===
Food sources of the Palaeolithic hunter-gatherers were wild plants and animals harvested from the environment. They liked animal organ meats, including the livers, kidneys and brains. Large seeded legumes were part of the human diet long before the agricultural revolution, as is evident from archaeobotanical finds from the Mousterian layers of Kebara Cave, in Israel. Moreover, recent evidence indicates that humans processed and consumed wild cereal grains as far back as 23,000 years ago in the Upper Paleolithic. An example of grain-based Stone Age food is flatbread.

Near the end of the Wisconsin glaciation, 15,000 to 9,000 years ago, mass extinction of Megafauna such as the woolly mammoth occurred in Asia, Europe, North America and Australia. This was the first Holocene extinction event. It possibly forced modification in the dietary habits of the humans of that age and with the emergence of agricultural practices, plant-based foods also became a regular part of the diet. A number of factors have been suggested for the extinction: certainly over-hunting, but also deforestation and climate change. The net effect was to fragment the vast ranges required by the large animals and extinguish them piecemeal in each fragment.

=== Shelter and habitat ===
Around 2 million years ago, Homo habilis is believed to have constructed the first man-made structure in East Africa, consisting of simple arrangements of stones to hold branches of trees in position. A similar stone circular arrangement believed to be around 380,000 years old was discovered at Terra Amata, near Nice, France. (Concerns about the dating have been raised: see Terra Amata.) Several human habitats dating back to the Stone Age have been discovered around the globe, including:

- A tent-like structure inside a cave near the Grotte du Lazaret, Nice, France.
- A structure with a roof supported with timber, discovered in Dolní Věstonice, the Czech Republic, dates to around 23,000 BC. The walls were made of packed clay blocks and stones.
- Many huts made of mammoth bones have been found in East-Central Europe and Siberia. The people who made these huts were expert mammoth hunters. Examples have been found along the Dniepr river valley of Ukraine, including near Chernihiv, in Moravia, Czech Republic and in southern Poland.
- An animal hide tent dated to around 15000 to 10000 BC, in the Magdalenian, was discovered at Plateau Parain, France.

=== Art ===
Prehistoric art is visible in the artifacts. Prehistoric music is inferred from found instruments, while parietal art can be found on rocks of any kind. The latter are petroglyphs and rock paintings. The art may or may not have had a religious function.

==== Petroglyphs ====
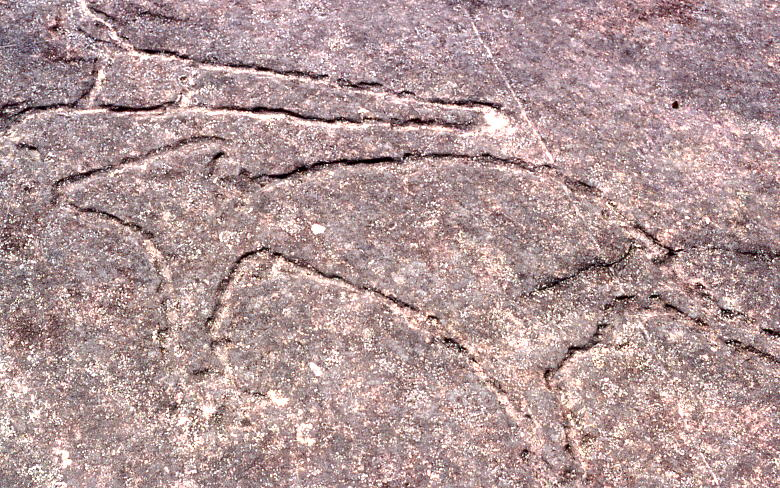
Petroglyph in Sydney, Australia

Petroglyphs appeared in the Neolithic. A Petroglyph is an intaglio abstract or symbolic image engraved on natural stone by various methods, usually by prehistoric peoples. They were a dominant form of pre-writing symbols. Petroglyphs have been discovered in different parts of the world, including Australia (Sydney rock engravings), Asia (Bhimbetka, India), North America (Death Valley National Park), South America (Cumbe Mayo, Peru), and Europe (Finnmark, Norway).

==== Rock paintings ====
In Paleolithic times, mostly animals were painted, in theory ones that were used as food or represented strength, such as the rhinoceros or large cats (as in the Chauvet Cave). Signs such as dots were sometimes drawn. Rare human representations include handprints and half-human/half-animal figures. The Cave of Chauvet in the Ardèche department, France, contains the most important cave paintings of the Paleolithic era, dating from about 36,000 BC. The Altamira cave paintings in Spain were done 14,000 to 12,000 BC and show, among others, bisons. The hall of bulls in Lascaux, Dordogne, France, dates from about 15,000 to 10,000 BC.

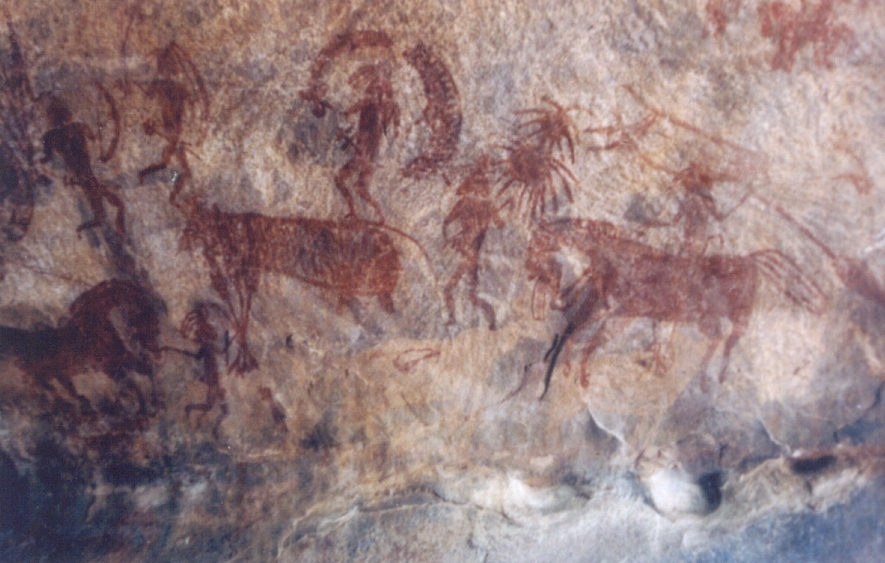
Rock painting at Bhimbetka, India, a World Heritage Site

The meaning of many of these paintings remains unknown. They may have been used for seasonal rituals. The animals are accompanied by signs that suggest a possible magic use. Arrow-like symbols in Lascaux are sometimes interpreted as calendar or almanac use, but the evidence remains interpretative.

Some scenes of the Mesolithic, however, can be typed and therefore, judging from their various modifications, are fairly clear. One of these is the battle scene between organized bands of archers. For example, "the marching warriors", a rock painting at Cingle de la Mola, Castellón in Spain, dated to about 7,000–4,000 BC, depicts about 50 bowmen in two groups marching or running in step toward each other, each man carrying a bow in one hand and a fistful of arrows in the other. A file of five men leads one band, one of whom is a figure with a "high crowned hat".

In other scenes elsewhere, the men wear head-dresses and knee ornaments but otherwise fight nude. Some scenes depict the dead and wounded, bristling with arrows. One is reminded of Ötzi the Iceman, a Copper Age mummy revealed by an Alpine melting glacier, who collapsed from loss of blood due to an arrow wound in the back.

=== Stone Age rituals and beliefs ===
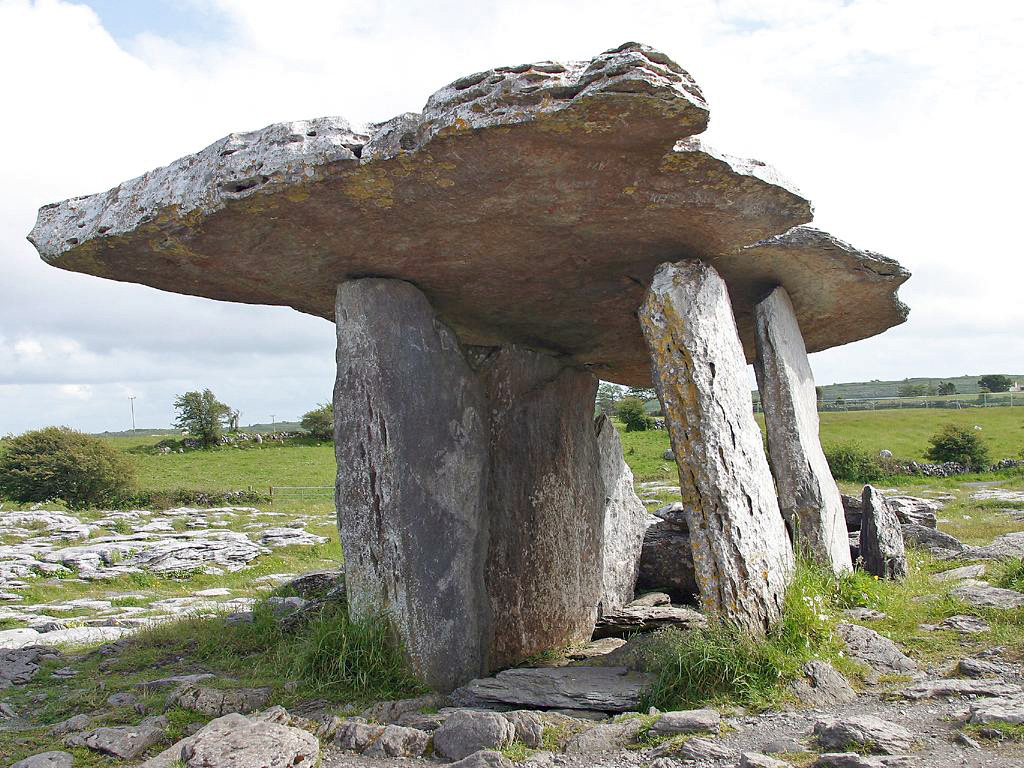
Poulnabrone dolmen in County Clare, Ireland

Modern studies and the in-depth analysis of finds dating from the Stone Age indicate certain rituals and beliefs of the people in those prehistoric times. It is now believed that activities of the Stone Age humans went beyond the immediate requirements of procuring food, body coverings, and shelters. Specific rites relating to death and burial were practiced, though certainly differing in style and execution between cultures. Megalithic tombs, multichambered, and dolmens, single-chambered, were graves with a huge stone slab stacked over other similarly large stone slabs; they have been discovered all across Europe and Asia and were built in the Neolithic and the Bronze Age.

== Modern popular culture ==
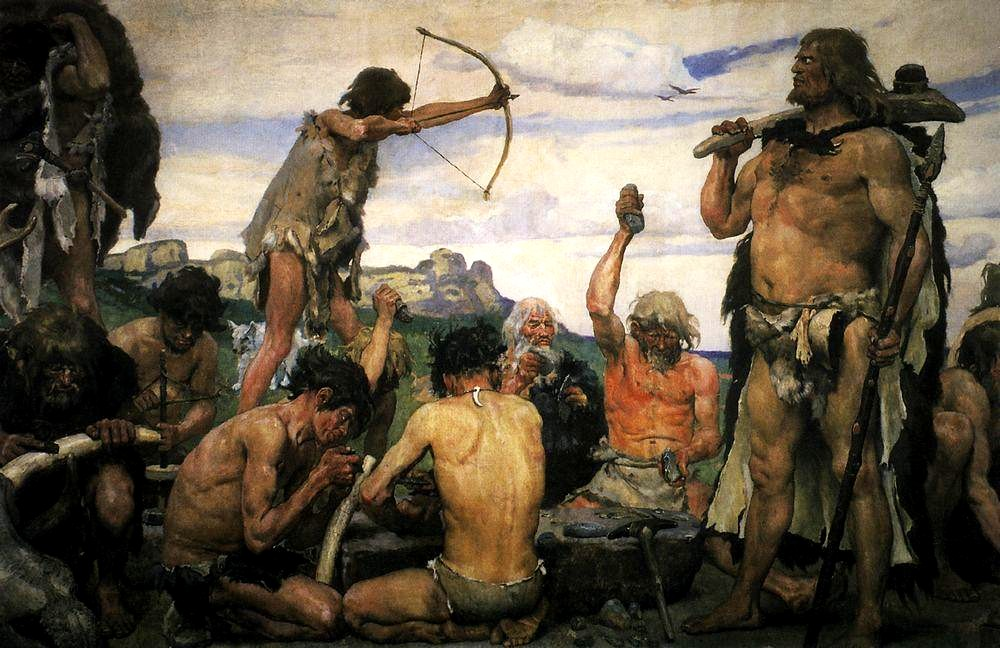
Imaginative depiction of the Stone Age, by Viktor Vasnetsov

The image of the caveman is commonly associated with the Stone Age. For example, a 2003 documentary series showing the evolution of humans through the Stone Age was called Walking with Cavemen, but only the last programme showed humans living in caves. While the idea that human beings and dinosaurs coexisted is sometimes portrayed in popular culture in cartoons, films and computer games, such as The Flintstones, One Million Years B.C. and Chuck Rock, the notion of hominids and non-avian dinosaurs co–existing is not supported by any scientific evidence. (See: Young Earth creationism and Human antiquitism)

Other depictions of the Stone Age include the best-selling Earth's Children series of books by Jean M. Auel, which are set in the Paleolithic and are loosely based on archaeological and anthropological findings.

The 1981 film Quest for Fire by Jean-Jacques Annaud tells the story of a group of early homo sapiens searching for their lost fire. A 21st-century series, Chronicles of Ancient Darkness by Michelle Paver tells of two New Stone Age children fighting to fulfil a prophecy and save their clan.

== See also ==
- List of Stone Age art
- Prehistoric warfare
- Timeline of prehistory
