= Movius Line =

Archaeological hypothesis

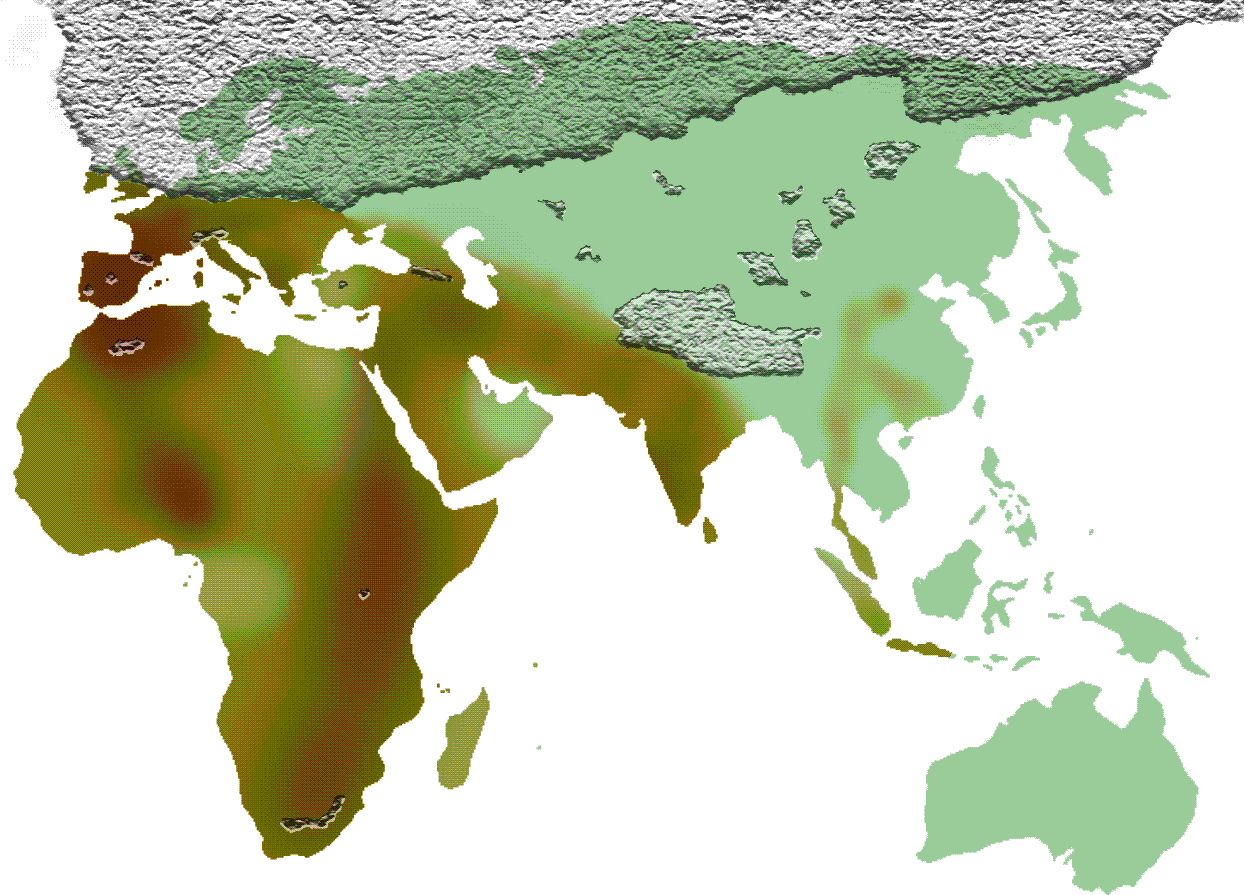
The Movius Line divides areas where prehistoric hand axes have been found, from those where they have not. Areas with hand axes Areas without hand axes

The Movius Line is a theoretical line drawn across northern India first proposed by the American archaeologist Hallam L. Movius in 1948 to demonstrate a technological difference between the early prehistoric tool technologies of the east and west of the Old World.

Movius had noticed that assemblages of palaeolithic stone tools from sites east of northern India never contained handaxes and tended to be characterized by less formal implements known as chopping tools. The most noticeable difference were the lack of Acheulean/Mode 2 tools in East Asia. These were sometimes as extensively worked as the Acheulean tools from further west but could not be described as true handaxes. Movius then drew a line on a map of India to show where the difference occurred, dividing the tools of Africa, Europe and Western and Southern Asia from those of Eastern and South-eastern Asia. Movius also proposed that the lack of Middle Paleolithic tools in East Asia could be due to a techno-cultural connection between Acheulean and Levallois traditions in tool manufacture. Similarly, research in 2006 showed that there are significantly fewer handaxe sites in East Asia than in East Africa and India.

Fossil evidence also suggests a difference in the evolutionary development of the people who made the two different tool types across the Movius Line and it has remained in use as a convenient distinction between the two traditions. The existence of the line, both in terms of stone tool technology and human evolution has needed to be explained.

Theories to explain the existence of the Movius Line include the idea that perhaps the ancestors of the toolmakers who settled in eastern Asia left Africa before the handaxe was developed. Alternatively the settlers moving to Asia may have known how to make handaxes but passed through a 'technological bottleneck', that is a region where suitable materials to make them were lacking. The skills were thus forgotten and isolation by distance meant that the knowledge was never re-introduced.

An alternate theory states that rather than stone axes, early humans in east Asia used bamboo tools instead.

== Exceptions ==
New archaeological evidence from Baise, China and Jeongok-ri, South Korea has shown that handaxes were also used in eastern Asia.

Stone tools found at Ban Don Mun in the Lampang province of northern Thailand have trifacial elements which are a short step from the bifacial aspects of African hand axes. It is possible that the environmental differences on either side of the Movius line prompted the invention of hand axes in one area and choppers in another. Also found in Thailand, in Sao Din, were various chopping and unifacial tools similar to those found in India, China, Korea, and southern Sumatra. The structure of the cobble artifacts are most comparable to the traditions found in China than to other traditions found in continental Asia or the southeastern Asian archipelago. These findings throughout the regions east of the Movius line brings to question the accuracy of the divide of Palaeolithic technological traditions.

In October 2014, over a dozen stone tools were found in the Changbai Mountains in northeastern China and dated to be about 50,000 years old. This date roughly coincides with the arrival of anatomically modern humans in China. Chinese archaeologist Chen Quanjia, who initially studied the find, called it a "complete repudiation" of the Movius Line hypothesis.

== Bibliography ==
- Scarre, C (ed), The Human Past, Thames and Hudson, London, 2005 ISBN 0-500-28531-4
