= Hallam L. Movius =

American archaeologist

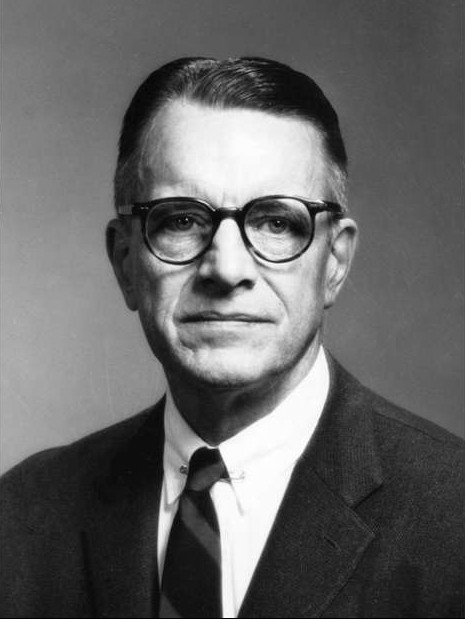
- Archaeologist Hallam L. Movius, who posited the existence of the Movius Line.
- Born: November 28, 1907; Newton, Massachusetts
- Died: May 30, 1987 (aged 79); Cambridge, Massachusetts
- Citizenship: United States of America
- Education: Harvard University
- Known for: Excavations in Europe and throughout Asia; Posited the Movius Line
- Scientific career
- Fields: Archaeology, Anthropology
- Workplaces: Harvard University,

Hallam Leonard Movius (November 28, 1907 – May 30, 1987) was an American archaeologist most famous for his work on the Palaeolithic period.

== Career ==
He was born in Newton, Massachusetts and attended Harvard College, graduating in 1930. After receiving his PhD from Harvard and serving in the 12th Air Force in North Africa and Italy during World War II, he returned to Harvard and became a professor of archaeology there. Eventually he also became curator of Paleolithic Archaeology at Harvard's Peabody Museum of Archaeology and Ethnology.

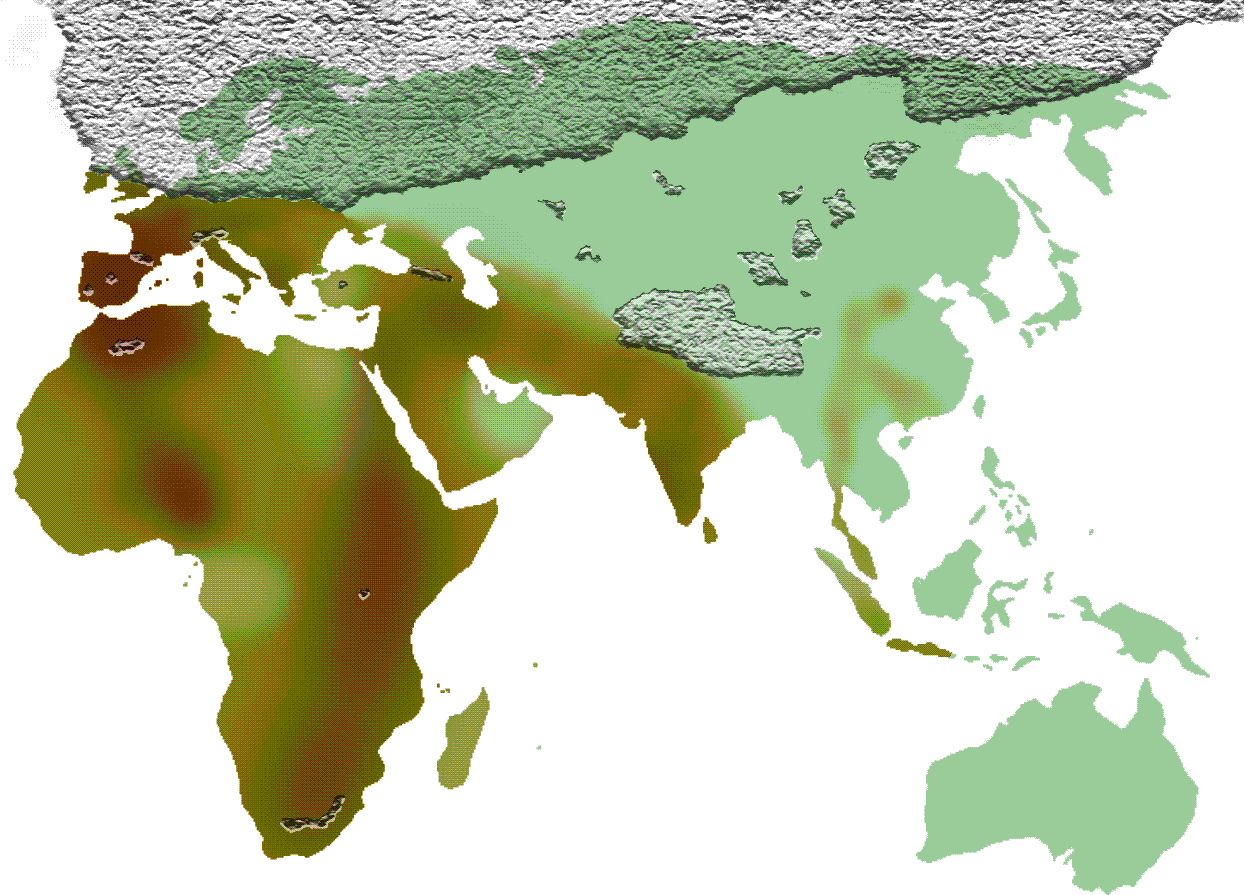
The Movius Line

In 1948 he proposed the existence of a Movius Line dividing the Acheulean tool users of Europe, Africa and western Asia from the chopping tool industries of East Asia.

He also studied the Perigordian and Aurignacian cultures of Palaeolithic France, excavating at the rock shelter of Abri Pataud in Les Eyzies (Dordogne) from 1958 to 1973.

He married Nancy Champion de Crespigny (1910–2003), daughter of the Australian physician Sir Trent Champion de Crespigny on 25 September 1936. The American poet Geoffrey Movius (born 1940) was a son.

== See also ==
- Movius Line
- Abri Pataud
- Les Eyzies-de-Tayac-Sireuil

== Bibliography ==
- Scarre, C (ed), The Human Past, Thames and Hudson, London, 2005 ISBN 0-500-28531-4
