= Abri Pataud =

Cave and archaeological site in France

- Pataud Shelter
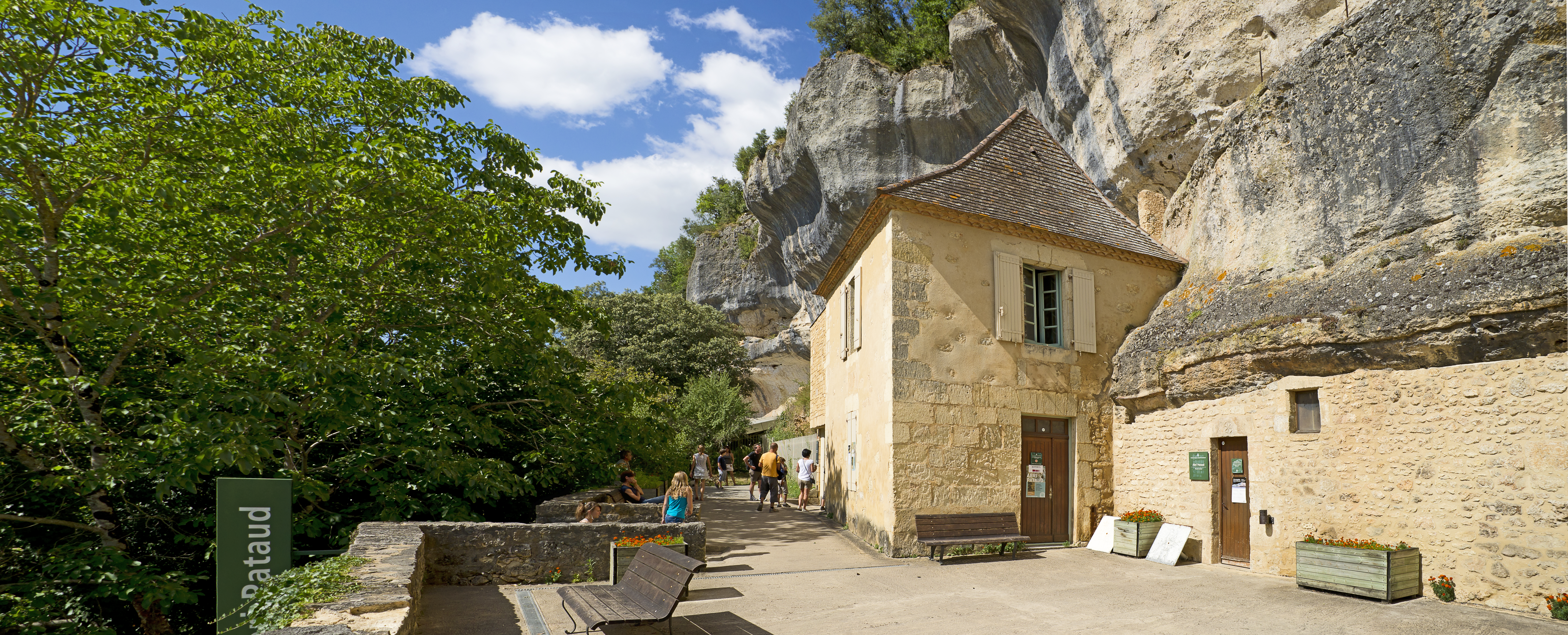
- Abri Pataud

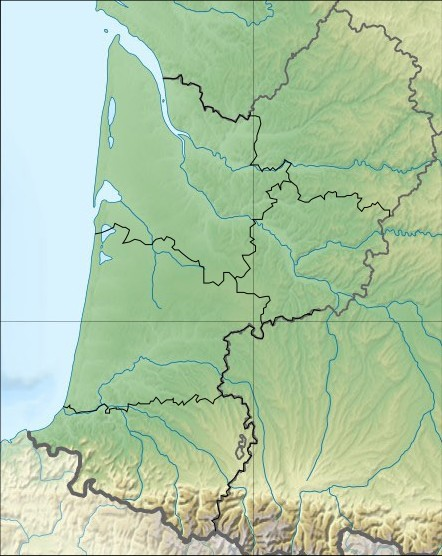
- Location in France Abri Pataud (France)
- 44°56′13″N 1°0′45″E
- Cultures: Magdalenian
- Location: near Les Eyzies,
- Region: Dordogne, France

Site notes
- Excavation dates: 1953,
- Archaeologists: Hallam L. Movius

L'Abri Pataud, or the Pataud Shelter in English, is a prehistoric site found in the middle of the village Les Eyzies in Dordogne, Aquitaine, southwestern France. The site includes human remains, stone tools, and early cultural artifacts made during the Upper Paleolithic, between approximately 47,000 and 17,000 years ago.

== Site overview ==
The stratigraphic sequence at the site includes remains from the Upper Paleolithic, particularly from the Aurignacian (47,000 to 27,000 BP), the Gravettian (32,000 to 22,000 BP), and lastly from the Solutrean (22,000 to 17,000 BP). Remains include human bones, tools, and cave paintings.

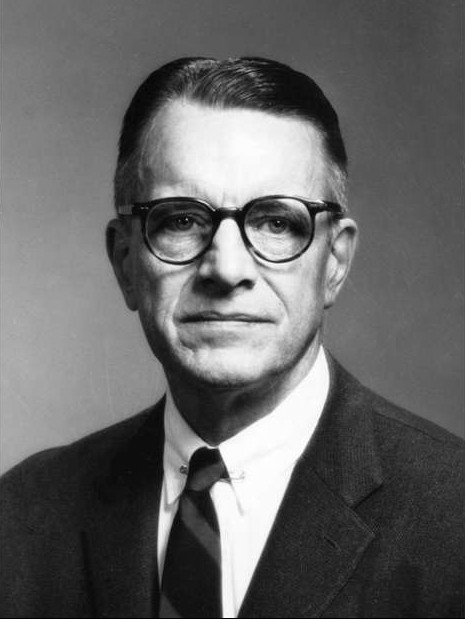
American archaeologist Hallam L. Movius, who directed early excavations at l'Abri Pataud.

The French government classified the site as an historical monument by decree on 25 June 1930, and additional shelters located nearby under the cliff further protected as of May 9, 1958. The site became the property of the museum of natural history in 1957 at the initiative of Hallam L. Movius, who had directed excavations since 1953. Movius continued to direct investigations between 1958 and 1964, aided by a team from the museum.

The results of the excavations were compiled by Harvey M. Bricker, on the basis of American hypotheses regarding the site's origins. A finer reading of the stratigraphy of the site may not have been published; continuing work will help elucidate the evolution of stone tool use at the shelters themselves, and their relationship to other sites in the region.

== The Venus of l'Abri Pataud ==
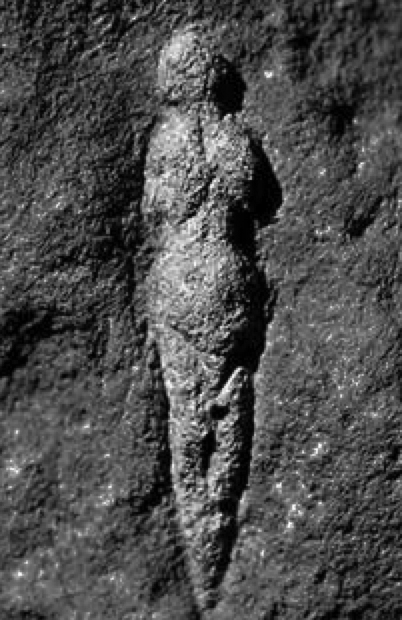
Venus of Abri Pataud, carved 21,000 years ago.

In 1958, a small carved female figure was found on a stone about 20 cm (7.9 in) tall, likely dating to approximately 21,000 years BP. According to Hallam Movius, the figure represents a comparatively young woman, "more slender and gracile than is normally the case," roughly carved, and with contours suggesting pregnancy. Movius wrote that the despite "disharmonic features, the overall proportions of the figure are both pleasing and, at first glance, symmetrical." Movius continued, "from a stylistic point of view, this figure has been rendered in the finest tradition of Upper Paleolithic art as represented by the well-known series of carvings and statuettes, collectively known as Venuses…"

The figure was found following a violent storm, making its origin within the shelter difficult to know exactly.

== Public access ==
Since 1990 the site has allowed visitors from the public. Under the direction of Henry de Lumley, assisted by Brigitte Delluc, a museum was established allowing partial views of excavations.

== See also ==
- Upper Paleolithic
- Hallam L. Movius
- Les Eyzies

== Bibliography ==
- Hallam L. Movius Jr., « The Abri Pataud Program of the French Upper Paleolithic in Retrospect », dans (en) Gordon R. Willey (dir.), Archaeological Researches in Retrospect, Cambridge, Winthrop Publishers, 1974, 296 p. (ISBN 0-87626-044-X) ; rééd. University Press of America, Washington, 1982 (ISBN 978-0-8191-2239-1), p. 87-116
- Hallam L. Movius Jr. (dir.), Excavations at the abri Pataud, Les Eyzies (Dordogne), Cambridge, Peabody Museum of Archaeology and Ethnology, Harvard University, coll. « American School of Prehistoric Research (ASPR) », 1975-1985 :
  - vol. 1 : (en) Hallam L. Movius Jr. (dir.), Excavations at the abri Pataud, Les Eyzies (Dordogne) (no 30), 1975, 305 p. (ISBN 0-87365-533-8) avec des contributions d'Hallam L. Movius Jr., Sheldon Judson, William R. Farrand, Jean Bouchud, S. Peter Dance, Joakim J. Donner, Joan F. Wilson, William H. Drury, Harvey M. Bricker, Ginette Billy et Pierre Legoux
  - vol. 2 : (en) Hallam L. Movius Jr., Excavations at the abri Pataud, Les Eyzies (Dordogne): Stratigraphy (no 31), 1977, 167 p. (ISBN 0-87365-534-6)
  - vol. 3 : (en) Harvey M. Bricker (dir.) et Nicholas David, Excavations at the abri Pataud, Les Eyzies (Dordogne): The Périgordian VI (level 3) assemblage (no 34), 1984, 109 p. (ISBN 0-87365-537-0)
  - vol. 4 : (en) Harvey M. Bricker (dir.) et Nicholas David, Excavations at the abri Pataud, Les Eyzies (Dordogne): The Noaillian (Level 4) Assemblages and the Noaillian Culture in Western Europe (no 37), 1985, 355 p. (ISBN 0-87365-540-0)
- Brigitte Delluc et Gilles Delluc, « Un bouquetin sculpté de style solutréen dans la cave troglodytique Pataud (Les Eyzies, Dordogne) », L'Anthropologie, vol. 90, no 4, 1986, p. 603-612
- Brigitte Delluc et Gilles Delluc, L'abri Pataud aux Eyzies, Le Bugue, PLB, coll. « Fleur de lys », 1990, 16 p. (ISBN 2-86952-016-6)
- Harvey M. Bricker (dir.), Le Paléolithique supérieur de l'abri Pataud (Dordogne) : Les fouilles de H.L. Movius Jr., Paris, Éditions de la Maison des sciences de l'homme, coll. « Documents d'archéologie française (DAF) » (no 50), 1995, 328 p. (ISBN 2-7351-0628-4)
- Bruno Bosselin, « Contribution de l'abri Pataud à la chronologie du Gravettien français », Bulletin de la Société préhistorique française, vol. 93, no 2, avril-juin 1996, p. 183-194 [texte intégral]
- Bruno Bosselin, Le Protomagdalénien du Blot : Les industries lithiques dans le contexte culturel du Gravettien français, Liège, Université de Liège, coll. « Études et recherches archéologiques de l'université de Liège (ERAUL) » (no 64), 1997, 329 p.
- Brigitte Delluc et Gilles Delluc, Visiter l'abri Pataud, Bordeaux, Sud Ouest, coll. « Visiter », 1998, 32 p. (ISBN 2-87901-265-1)
- Dans les actes du XIVe congrès de l'Union internationale des sciences préhistoriques et protohistoriques (UISPP), à l'Université de Liège, du 2 au 8 septembre 2001 :
- Laurent Chiotti, Brigitte Delluc, Gilles Delluc, Christiane Leroy-Prost, Roland Nespoulet, Marylène Patou-Mathis, Marie Perpère, Christophe Pottier, Astrid Vannoorenberghe, Carole Vercoutère, « Le Paléolithique supérieur de l'abri Pataud, Les Eyzies-de-Tayac, Dordogne, France : Nouveaux résultats », dans Secrétariat général du Congrès (dir.), Michel Dewez (dir.), Pierre Noiret (dir.) et Éric Teheux (dir.), Section 6, Le paléolithique supérieur, sessions générales et posters, Oxford, Archaeopress, coll. « British Archaeological Reports (BAR) / International Series » (no S1240), 2004, 317 p. (ISBN 1-84171-599-9), p. 285-292
- Brigitte Delluc et Gilles Delluc, « L'art à l'abri Pataud, Les Eyzies, Dordogne », dans Marylise Lejeune (dir.) et Anne-Catherine Welte (dir.), L'art du Paléolithique supérieur : Actes des colloques 8.2 et 8.3, Liège, Université de Liège, coll. « Études et recherches archéologiques de l'université de Liège (ERAUL) » (no 107), 2004, 277 p., p. 87-94
- Bruno Bosselin, « Quelques précisions sur la chronologie du Gravettien français », Bulletin de la société Préhistoire du Sud-Ouest, vol. 9, no 1, 2002, p. 95-100 [texte intégral]
- Laurent Chiotti, Les industries lithiques aurignaciennes de l'abri Pataud, Dordogne, France : Les fouilles de Hallam L. Movius Jr., Oxford, Archaeopress, coll. « British Archaeological Reports (BAR) / International Series » (no 1392), 2005, 349 p. (ISBN 1-84171-830-0)
- Christophe Pottier, Le Gravettien moyen de l'abri Pataud (Dordogne, France), le niveau 4 et l'éboulis 3/4 : Étude technologique et typologique de l'industrie lithique, thèse pour obtenir le grade de docteur du Muséum national d'histoire naturelle, Département de Préhistoire, Institut de paléontologie humaine, sous la dir. d'Henry de Lumley, 7 janvier 2005, 396
