= Chopping tool =

Type of stone tool

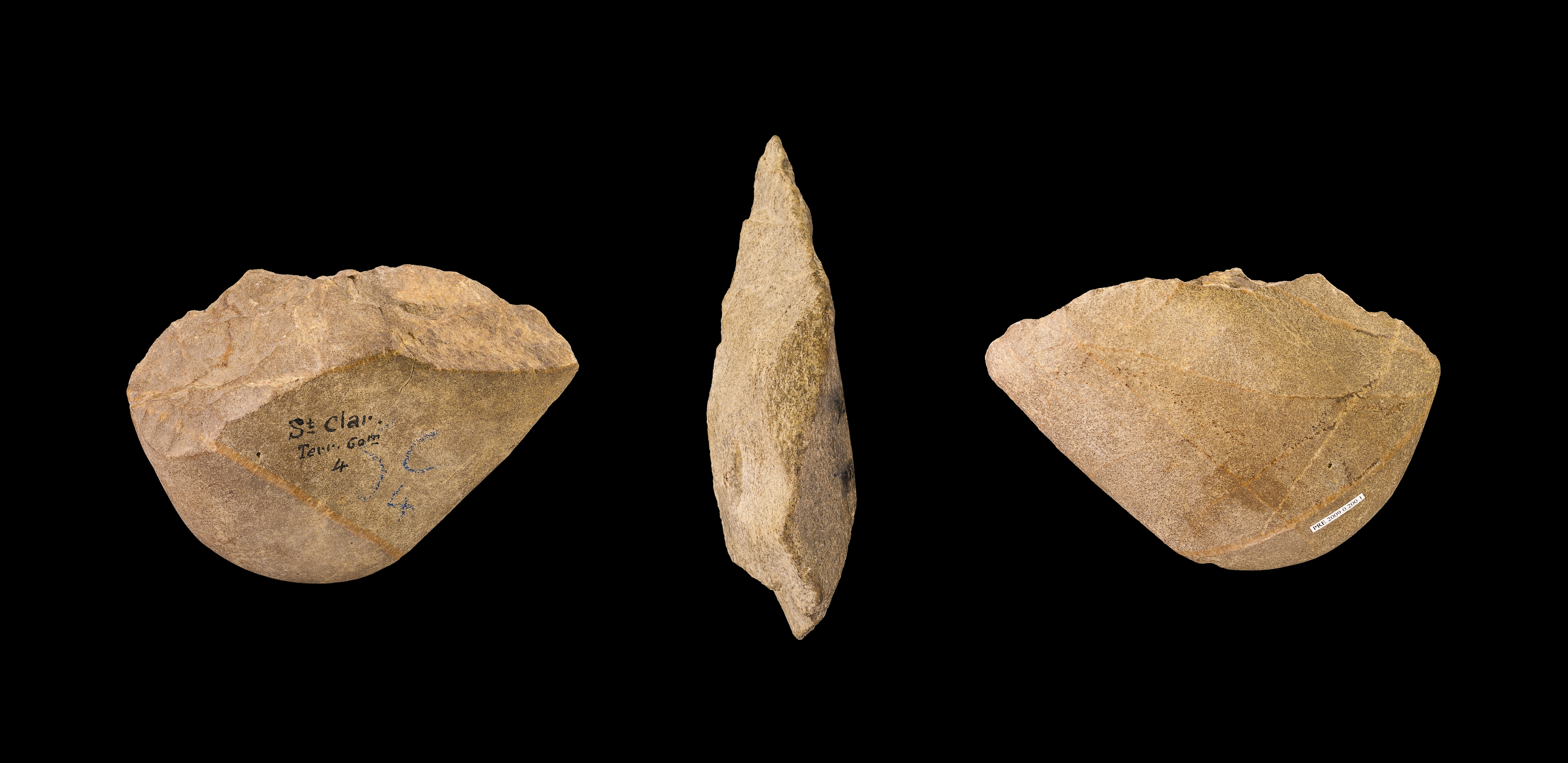
Chopping tools

In archaeology a chopping tool is a stone tool. Stone tools are usually dated by determining the age of the find context e.g. by carbon-14 dating and potassium–argon dating. The oldest stone tools are about 3 million years old.

Chopping tools mainly occur in the Olduwan (2.9 to 1.6 million years ago). The oldest object in the British Museum is a chopping tool found in the Olduvai Gorge in Tanzania.

Usually naturally occurring rather flat pebbles were used to produce a chopping tool. At one end flakes were removed by hard hammer percussion in an alternating manner i.e. from one flat surface and then from the other to produce a sharp edge at the ridge between the two surfaces.

The most frequent raw material ('type of rock') is volcanic rock e.g. basalt, but other rocks exhibiting conchoidal fracture were used as well.

The use of the chopping tool varied from place to place just like any other archaeological artifact, depending on what the maker of the chopping tool made or ate depended on what the chopping tool was used for. Most commonly the chopping tool was used for food purposes. They could be used for cutting down tree branches to get to fruits or to cut large plants that could be used for food. Anything that requires a knife today could have been replaced with a chopping tool. They were also used to help assist the maker in cutting the meat of the animals. Just like butchers today, skinning and cleaning of all the meat that we eat is needed. The chopping tool helped assist hunters gather the meat, especially from large animals that were hard to carry back to the location they were staying at, and make it edible for them to consume. Another use for the chopping tool was to smash bones. Bone marrow is a good source of nutrients. For hunters and gatherers this was important since the next source of food could have been days to weeks away. When they would hunt animals they would use the sharp edge to cut the meat off the bones and then the back edge was hard enough to smash and crush bones. Once the bones were crushed the marrow could be collected.

The flakes that were chipped off the soft rock did not go to waste. Many of the thick sharp pieces were used as small knives to do very light cutting tasks. The flakes were a very important part of everyday life just like the chopping tool. Both pieces were used in everyday life to help with survival.

The idea of the chopping tool spread from people to people throughout the land. In Asia stone tools did not develop as much as other places in the world. Tools like the chopping tool list be made from specific types of rock such as flint and jasper. In Asia these rocks were hard to find but the amount of the coarse-grained rocks and material was much easier to find. Even though the materials they used such as volcanic material and petrified wood were not as strong or as easy to shape they still were able to make tools that resembled the chopping tool and they were used in very similar ways. Many of the tools that were found in Asia, they were found in the Choukoutienian caves. The Choukoutienian industry is where many of the stone tools in Asia started. The caves are filled with many artifacts and the early chopping tool is one of the many artifacts found.

The resources used to make many variations of the chopping tool were present in much of the world. Even if the items that were used to make the chopping tool in various parts of the world were not as durable or as powerful or sharp they still were used for cutting items as well as day to day survival.
