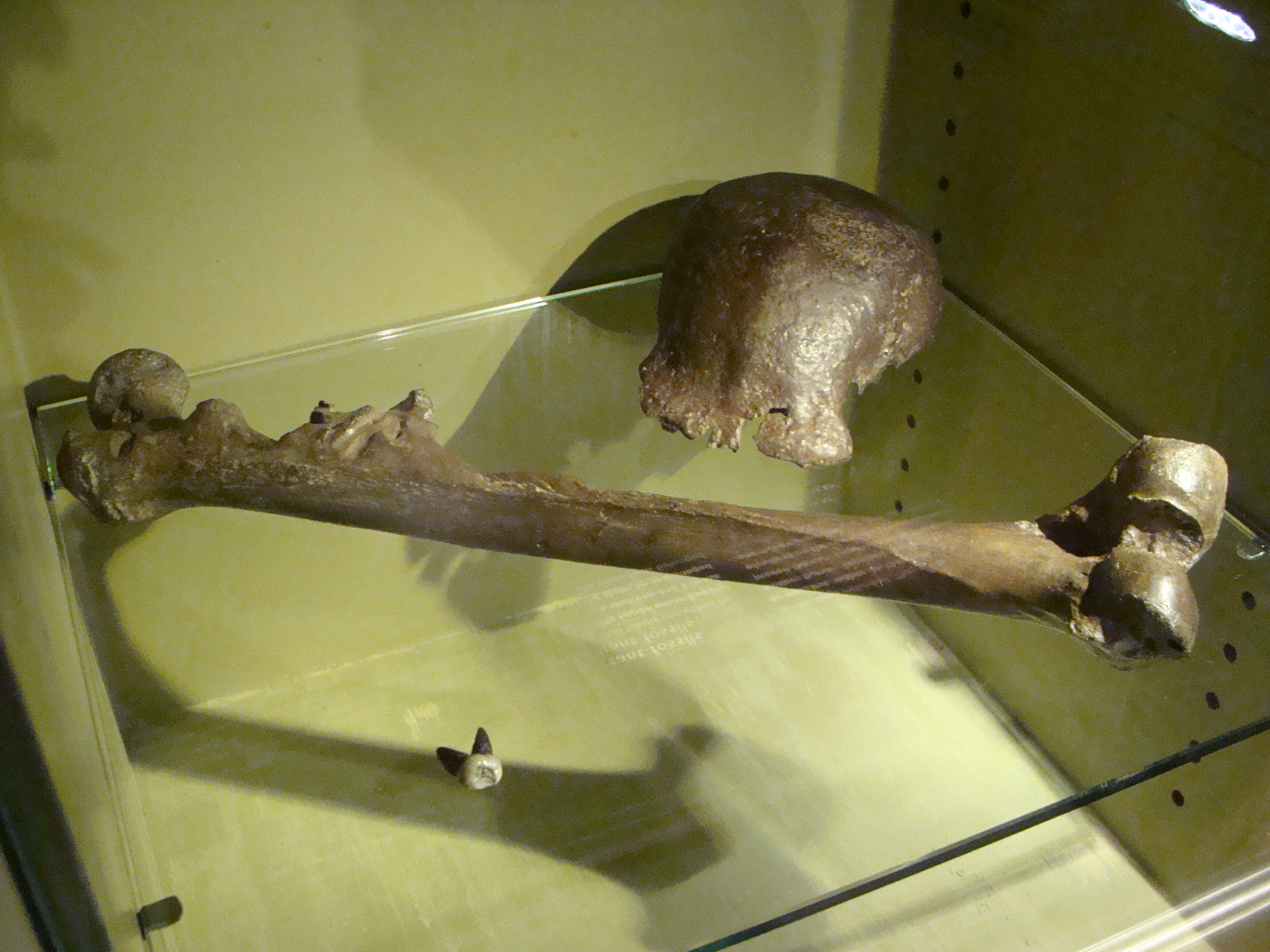
- The syntype fossils of Java Man (H. e. erectus), at Naturalis, Leiden

Scientific classification
- Kingdom: Animalia
- Phylum: Chordata
- Class: Mammalia
- Order: Primates
- Superfamily: Hominoidea
- Family: Hominidae
- Genus: Homo
- Species: †H. erectus
- Subspecies: †H. e. erectus

Trinomial name
- †Homo erectus erectus

= Java Man =

Java Man Temporal range: 1.49–0.7 Ma Pleistocene

Subspecies of Homo erectus (fossil) discovered on the island of Java in 1891

Java Man (Homo erectus erectus, formerly also Anthropopithecus erectus or Pithecanthropus erectus) is an early human fossil discovered in 1891 and 1892 on the island of Java (Indonesia). Estimated to be between 700,000 and 1,490,000 years old, it was, at the time of its discovery, the oldest hominid fossil ever found, and it remains the type specimen for Homo erectus.

Led by Eugène Dubois, the excavation team uncovered a tooth, a skullcap, and a thighbone at Trinil on the banks of the Solo River in East Java. Arguing that the fossils represented the "missing link" between apes and humans, Dubois gave the species the scientific name Anthropopithecus erectus, then later renamed it Pithecanthropus erectus. The fossil aroused much controversy. Within a decade of the discovery almost eighty books or articles had been published on Dubois's finds. Despite Dubois's argument, few accepted that Java Man was a transitional form between apes and humans. Some dismissed the fossils as apes and others as modern humans, whereas many scientists considered Java Man as a primitive side branch of evolution not related to modern humans at all. In the 1930s Dubois made the claim that Pithecanthropus was built like a "giant gibbon", a much misinterpreted attempt by Dubois to prove that it was the "missing link". Eventually, similarities between Java Man and Sinanthropus pekinensis (Peking Man) led Ernst Mayr to rename both Homo erectus in 1950, placing them directly in the human evolutionary tree.

To distinguish Java Man from other Homo erectus populations, some scientists began to regard it as a subspecies, Homo erectus erectus, in the 1970s. Other fossils found in the first half of the twentieth century in Java at Sangiran and Mojokerto, all older than those found by Dubois, are also considered part of the species Homo erectus. The fossils of Java Man have been housed at the Rijksmuseum van Geologie en Mineralogie and later Naturalis in the Netherlands since 1900. On September 26, 2025 the Dutch government announced that the whole Dubois collection, including Java Man, will be restituted to Indonesia due to the circumstances of its acquisition.

== History of discoveries ==
=== Background ===
Charles Darwin had argued that humanity evolved in Africa, because this is where great apes like gorillas and chimpanzees lived. Though Darwin's claims have since been vindicated by the fossil record, they were proposed without any fossil evidence. Other scientific authorities disagreed with him, like Charles Lyell, a geologist, and Alfred Russel Wallace, who thought of a similar theory of evolution around the same time as Darwin. Because both Lyell and Wallace believed that humans were more closely related to gibbons or another great ape (the orangutans), they identified Southeast Asia as the cradle of humanity because this is where these apes lived. Dutch anatomist Eugène Dubois favored the latter theory, and sought to confirm it.

=== Trinil fossils ===
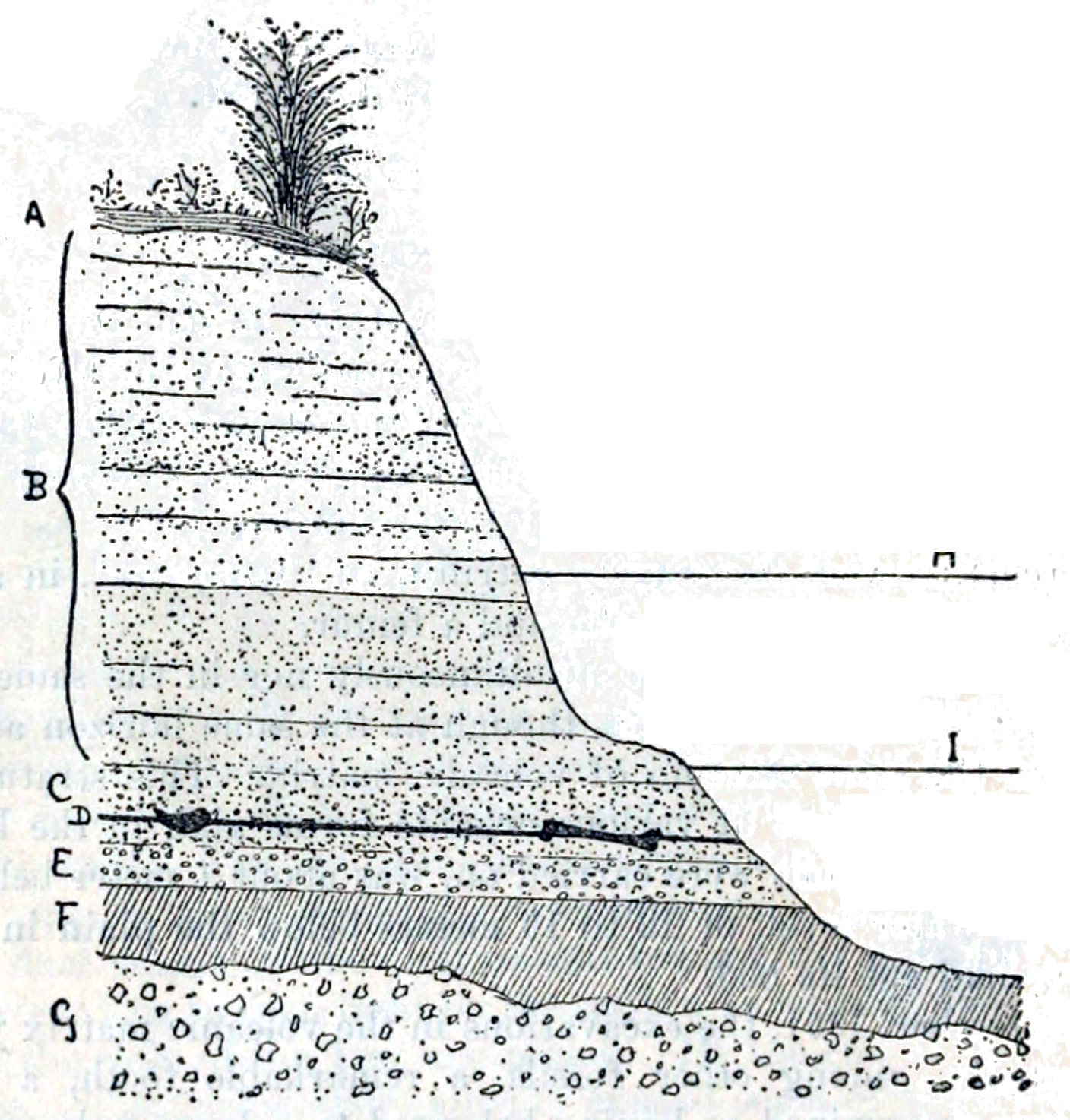
Eugène Dubois's stratigraphic section of the site where he found Java Man. The femur and skullcap appear at level D between a "lapilli" stratum (C) and a "conglomerate" (E).

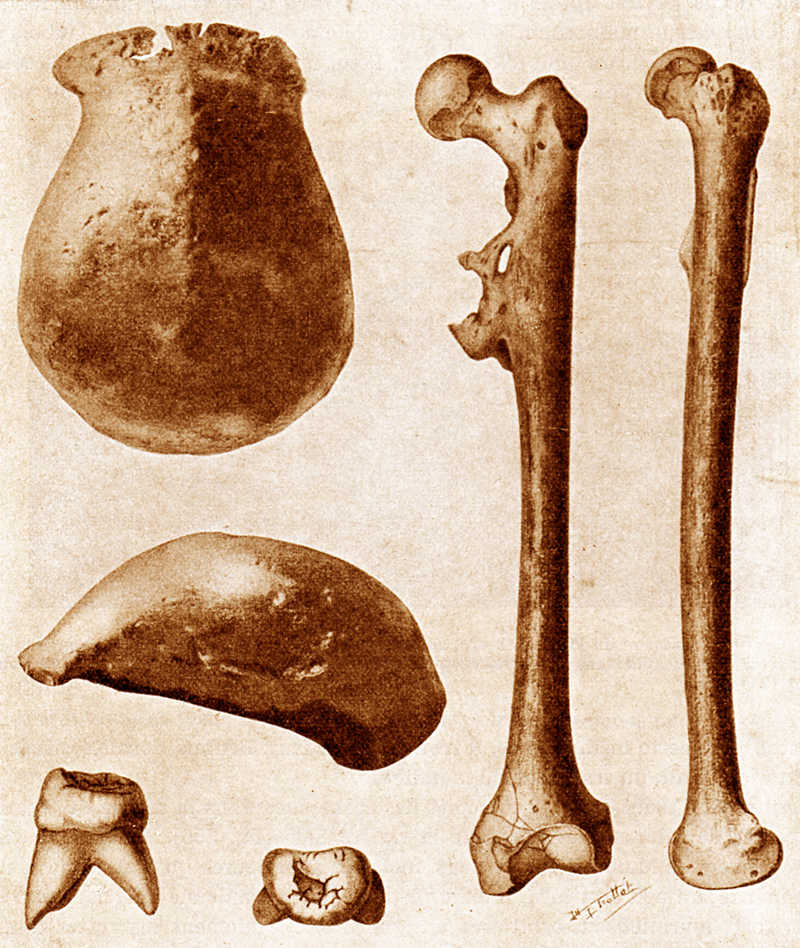
The three main fossils of Java Man found in 1891–92: a skullcap, a molar, and a thighbone, each seen from two different angles.

In October 1887, Dubois abandoned his academic career and left for the Dutch East Indies (present-day Indonesia) to look for the fossilized ancestor of modern man. Having received no funding from the Dutch government for his eccentric endeavor – since no one at the time had ever found an early human fossil while looking for it – he joined the Dutch East Indies Army as a military surgeon. Because of his work duties, it was only in July 1888 that he began to excavate caves in Sumatra. Having quickly found abundant fossils of large mammals, Dubois was relieved of his military duties (March 1889), and the colonial government assigned two engineers and fifty convicts to help him with his excavations. After he failed to find the fossils he was looking for on Sumatra, he moved on to Java in 1890.

Again assisted by convict laborers and two army corporals, Dubois began searching along the Solo River near Trinil in August 1891. His team soon excavated a molar (Trinil 1) and a skullcap (Trinil 2). Its characteristics were a long cranium with a sagittal keel and heavy browridge. Dubois first gave them the name Anthropopithecus ("man-ape"), as the chimpanzee was sometimes known at the time. He chose this name because a similar tooth found in the Siwalik Hills in India in 1878 had been named Anthropopithecus, and because Dubois first assessed the cranium to have been about 700 cubic centimetres (43 cu in), closer to apes than to humans.

In August 1892, a year later, Dubois's team found a long femur (thighbone) shaped like a human one, suggesting that its owner had stood upright. The femur bone was found 50 feet (approx. 15 meters) from the original find one year earlier. Believing that the three fossils belonged to a single individual, "probably a very aged female", Dubois renamed the specimen Anthropopithecus erectus. Only in late 1892, when he determined that the cranium measured about 900 cubic centimetres (55 cu in), did Dubois consider that his specimen was a transitional form between apes and humans. In 1894, he thus renamed it Pithecanthropus erectus ("upright ape-man"), borrowing the genus name Pithecanthropus from Ernst Haeckel, who had coined it a few years earlier to refer to a supposed "missing link" between apes and humans. This specimen has also been known as Pithecanthropus 1.

=== Comparisons with Peking Man ===
In 1927, Canadian Davidson Black identified two fossilized teeth he had found in Zhoukoudian near Beijing as belonging to an ancient human, and named his specimen Sinanthropus pekinensis, now better known as Peking Man. In December 1929, the first of several skullcaps was found on the same site, and it appeared similar but slightly larger than Java Man. Franz Weidenreich, who replaced Black in China after the latter's death in 1933, argued that Sinanthropus was also a transitional fossil between apes and humans, and was in fact so similar to Java's Pithecanthropus that they should both belong to the family Hominidae. Eugène Dubois categorically refused to entertain this possibility, dismissing Peking Man as a kind of Neanderthal, closer to humans than the Pithecanthropus, and insisting that Pithecanthropus belonged to its own superfamily, the Pithecanthropoidea.

=== Other discoveries on Java ===
After the discovery of Java Man, Berlin-born paleontologist G. H. R. von Koenigswald recovered several other early human fossils in Java. Between 1931 and 1933 von Koenigswald discovered fossils of Solo Man from sites along the Bengawan Solo River on Java, including several skullcaps and cranial fragments. In 1936, von Koenigswald discovered a juvenile skullcap known as the Mojokerto child in East Java. Considering the Mojokerto child skull cap to be closely related to humans, von Koenigswald wanted to name it Pithecanthropus modjokertensis (after Dubois's specimen), but Dubois protested that Pithecanthropus was not a human but an "ape-man".

Von Koenigswald also made several discoveries in Sangiran, Central Java, where more fossils of early humans were discovered between 1936 and 1941. Among the discoveries was a skullcap of similar size to that found by Dubois at the Trinil 2 site. Von Koenigswald's discoveries in Sangiran convinced him that all these skulls belonged to early humans. Dubois again refused to acknowledge the similarity. Ralph von Koenigswald and Franz Weidenreich compared the fossils from Java and Zhoukoudian and concluded that Java Man and Peking Man were closely related. Dubois died in 1940, still refusing to recognize their conclusion, and official reports remain critical of the Sangiran site's poor presentation and interpretation.

== Early interpretations ==
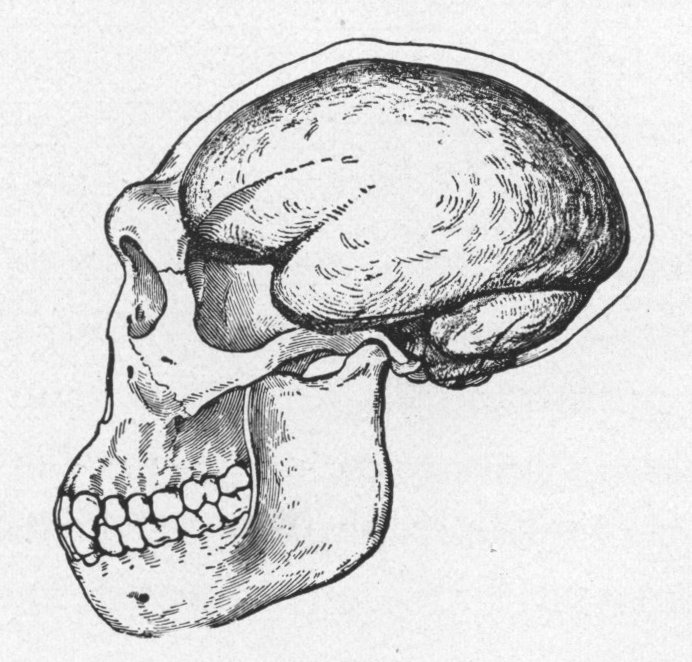
1922 reconstruction of a Java Man skull, due to Trinil 2 being only a cranium, Dubois who believed Java man was transitional between apes and humans, drew the reconstruction with an ape-like jaw but a brain larger than apes'

More than 50 years after Dubois's find, Ralph von Koenigswald recollected that, "No other paleontological discovery has created such a sensation and led to such a variety of conflicting scientific opinions." The Pithecanthropus fossils were so immediately controversial that by the end of the 1890s, almost 80 publications had already discussed them.

Until the Taung child – the 2.8 million-year-old remains of an Australopithecus africanus – were discovered in South Africa in 1924, Dubois's and Koenigswald's discoveries were the oldest hominid remains ever found. Some scientists of the day suggested that Dubois's Java Man was a potential intermediate form between modern humans and the common ancestor we share with the other great apes. The current consensus of anthropologists is that the direct ancestors of modern humans were African populations of Homo erectus (Homo ergaster), rather than the Asian populations of the same species exemplified by Java Man and Peking Man.

=== Missing link theory ===
Dubois first published his find in 1894. Dubois's central claim was that Pithecanthropus was a transitional form between apes and humans, a so-called "missing link". Many disagreed. Some critics claimed that the bones were those of an upright walking ape, or that they belonged to a primitive human. This judgment made sense at a time when an evolutionary view of humanity had not yet been widely accepted, and scientists tended to view hominid fossils as racial variants of modern humans rather than as ancestral forms. After Dubois let a number of scientists examine the fossils in a series of conferences held in Europe in the 1890s, they started to agree that Java Man may be a transitional form after all, but most of them thought of it as "an extinct side branch" of the human tree that had indeed descended from apes, but not evolved into humans. This interpretation eventually imposed itself and remained dominant until the 1940s.

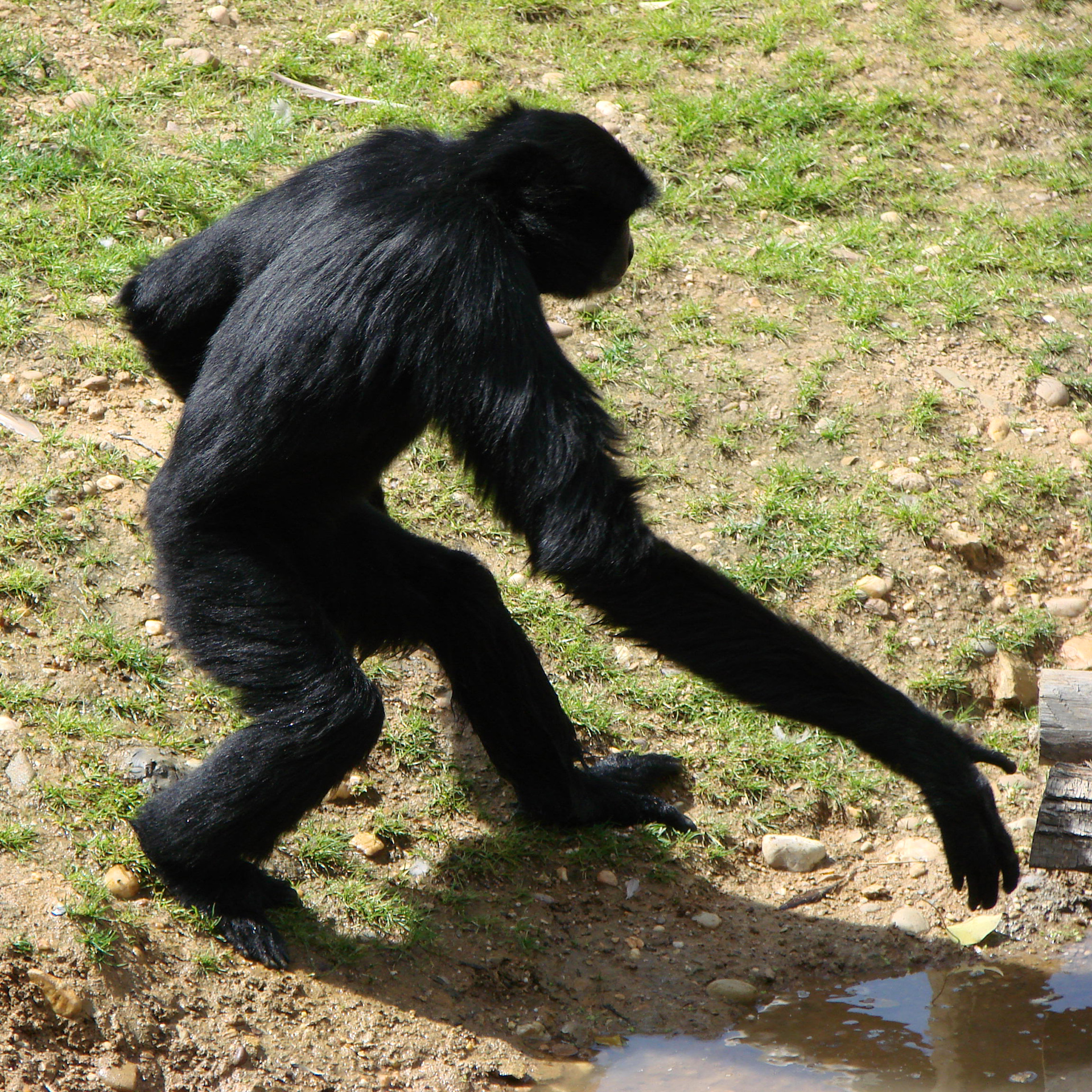
The gibbon's ability to stand and walk upright made Eugène Dubois believe it was closely related to humans. This is one of the reasons why he once claimed that Java Man looked like a "giant gibbon".

Dubois was bitter about this and locked the fossil up in a trunk until 1923 when he showed it to Ales Hrdlicka from the Smithsonian Institution. In response to critics who refused to accept that Java Man was a "missing link", in 1932 Dubois published a paper arguing that the Trinil bones looked like those of a "giant gibbon". Dubois's use of the phrase has been widely misinterpreted as a retraction, but it was intended an argument to support his claim that Pithecanthropus was a transitional form. According to Dubois, evolution occurred by leaps, and the ancestors of humanity had doubled their brain-to-body ratio on each leap. To prove that Java Man was the "missing link" between apes and humans, he therefore had to show that its brain-to-body ratio was double that of apes and half that of humans. The problem was that Java Man's cranial capacity was 900 cubic centimeters, about two-thirds of modern humans'.

Like many scientists who believed that modern humans evolved "Out of Asia", Dubois thought that gibbons were closest to humans among the great apes. To preserve the proportions predicted by his theory of brain evolution, Dubois argued that Java Man was shaped more like a gibbon than a human. Imagined "with longer arms and a greatly expanded chest and upper body", the Trinil creature became a gigantic ape of about 100 kilograms (220 lb), but "double cephalization of the anthropoid apes in general and half that of man". It was therefore halfway on the path to becoming a modern human. As Dubois concluded his 1932 paper: "I still believe, now more firmly than ever, that the Pithecanthropus of Trinil is the real 'missing link.'"

=== Reclassification as Homo erectus ===
Based on Weidenreich's work and on his suggestion that Pithecanthropus erectus and Sinanthropus pekinensis were connected through a series of interbreeding populations, German biologist Ernst Mayr reclassified them both as being part of the same species: Homo erectus. Mayr presented his conclusion at the Cold Spring Harbor Symposium in 1950, and this resulted in Dubois's erectus species being reclassified under the genus Homo. As part of the reclassification, Mayr included not only Sinanthropus and Pithecanthropus, but also Plesianthropus, Paranthropus, Javanthropus, and several other genera as synonyms, arguing that all human ancestors were part of a single genus (Homo), and that "never one more than one species of man existed on the earth at any one time". A "revolution in taxonomy", Mayr's single-species approach to human evolution was quickly accepted. It shaped paleoanthropology in the 1950s and lasted into the 1970s, when the African genus Australopithecus was accepted into the human evolutionary tree.

In the 1970s, a tendency developed to regard the Javanese variety of H. erectus as a subspecies, Homo erectus erectus, with the Chinese variety being referred to as Homo erectus pekinensis.

== Post-discovery analysis ==
=== Date of the fossils ===
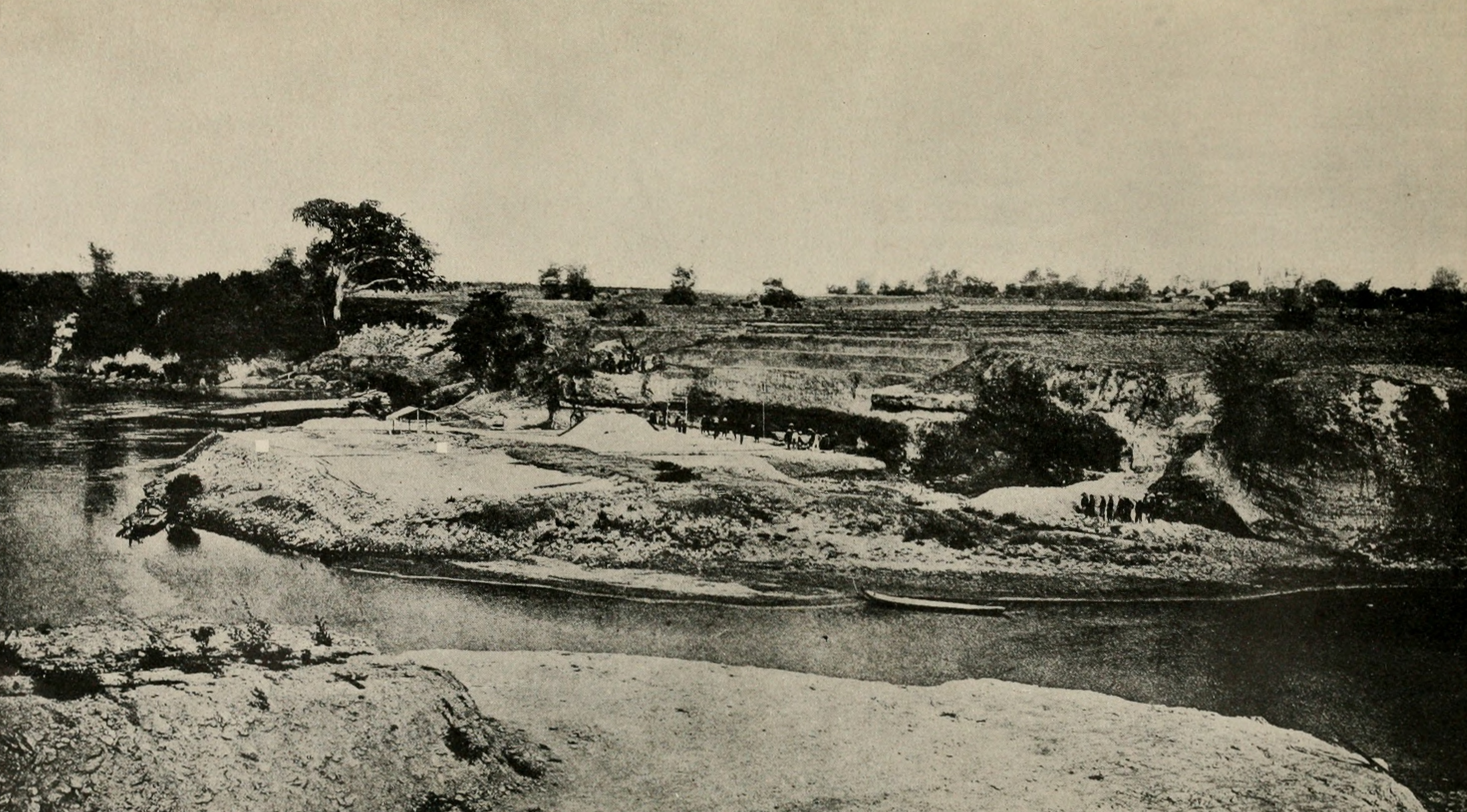
The locality of the Pithecanthropus find, on the Solo River, near Trinil, Java. The two white squares show where the femur (left) and the skullcap (right) were discovered. Their discovery near flowing water was one of the many sources of controversy that surrounded the fossils.

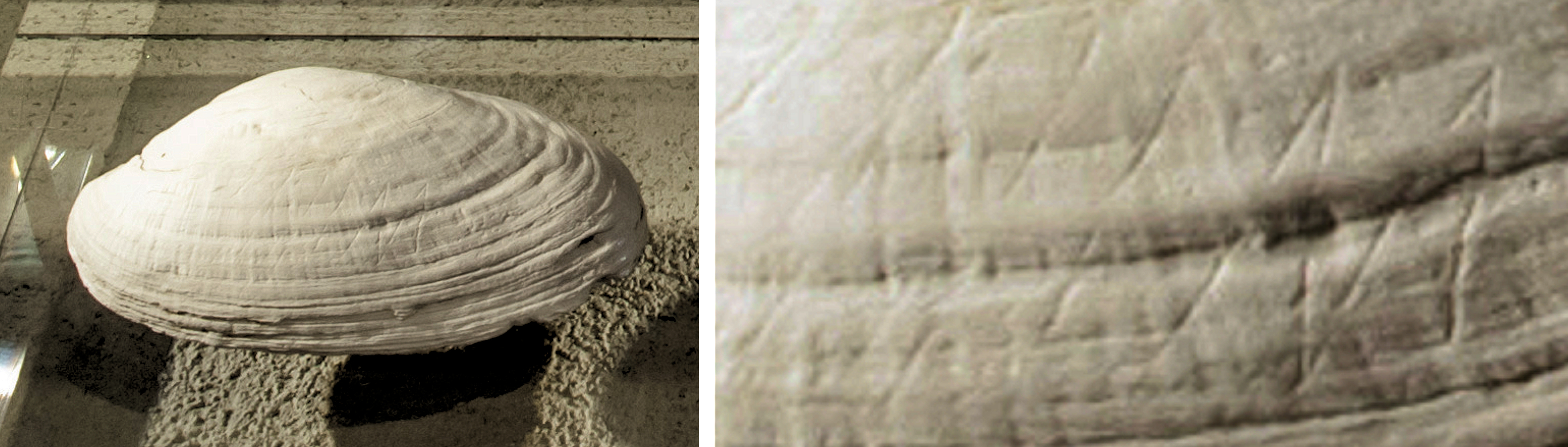
Pseudodon shell DUB1006-fL, found near Java Man and dated to circa 500,000 BP, contains the earliest known geometric engravings. From Trinil, Java. Now in the Naturalis Biodiversity Center, Netherlands.

Dubois's complete collection of fossils were transferred between 1895 and 1900 to what is now known as Naturalis, in Leiden in the Netherlands. The main fossil of Java Man, the skullcap cataloged as "Trinil 2", has been dated biostratigraphically, that is, by correlating it with a group of fossilized animals (a "faunal assemblage") found nearby on the same geological horizon, which is itself compared with assemblages from other layers and classified chronologically. Ralph von Koenigswald first assigned Java Man to the Trinil Fauna, a faunal assemblage that he composed from several Javanese sites. He concluded that the skullcap was about 700,000 years old, thus dating from the beginning of the Middle Pleistocene.

Though this view is still widely accepted, in the 1980s, a group of Dutch paleontologists used Dubois's collection of more than 20,000 animal fossils to reassess the date of the layer in which Java Man was found. Using only fossils from Trinil, they called that new faunal assemblage the Trinil H. K. Fauna, in which H. K. stands for Haupt Knochenschicht, or "main fossil-bearing layer". This assessment dates the fossils of Java Man to between 900,000 and 1,000,000 years old. On the other hand, work published in 2014 gives a "maximum age of 0.54 ± 0.10 million years and a minimum age of 0.43 ± 0.05 million years" for Ar-Ar and luminescence dating of sediment in human-predated shell material from Trinil. Work continues on assessing the dating of this complex site.

Other fossils attest to the even earlier presence of H. erectus in Java. Sangiran 2 (named after its discovery site) may be as old as 1.66 Ma (million years). The controversial Mojokerto child, which Carl C. Swisher and Garniss Curtis once dated to 1.81 ± 0.04 Ma, has now been convincingly re-dated to a maximum age of 1.49 ± 0.13 Ma, that is, 1.49 million years with a margin of error of plus or minus 130,000 years.

=== Type specimen ===
The fossils found in Java are considered the type specimen for H. erectus. Because the fossils of Java Man were found "scattered in an alluvial deposit" – they had been laid there by the flow of a river – detractors doubted that they belonged to the same species, let alone the same individual. German pathologist Rudolf Virchow, for instance, argued in 1895 that the femur was that of a gibbon. Dubois had difficulty convincing his critics, because he had not attended the excavation, and could not explain specifically enough the exact location of the bones. Because the Trinil thighbone looks very much like that of a modern human, it might have been a "reworked fossil", that is, a relatively young fossil that was deposited into an older layer after its own layer had been eroded. For this reason, there is still dissent about whether all the Trinil fossils represent the same species.

== Physical characteristics ==
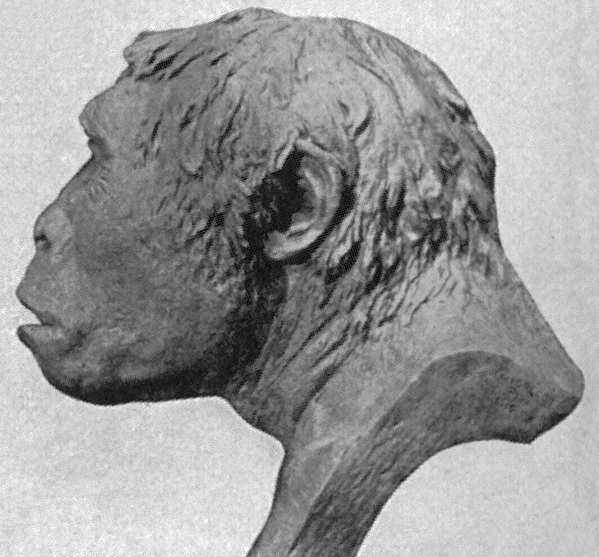
A 1922 reconstruction of the skull of Java Man (based on Trinil 2).

Java Man was about 173 cm (5 ft 8 in) tall and his thighbones show that he walked erect like modern humans. The femur is thicker than that of a modern human, indicating he was engaging in a lot of running. The skull was characterized by thick bones and a retreating forehead. The large teeth made the jaw large and jutting, with the lower lips overhanging the lower margin of the mandible, giving the impression of no chin. The browridges were straight and massive. At 900 cm^{3}, his cranial capacity was smaller than that of later H. erectus specimens. However, he had humanlike teeth with large canines.

Judging from anatomical and archeological aspects as well as Java Man's ecological role, meat from vertebrates was likely an important part of their diet. Java Man, like other Homo erectus, was probably a rare species. There is evidence that Java Man used shell tools to cut meat. Java Man's dispersal through Southeast Asia coincides with the extirpation of the giant turtle Megalochelys, possibly due to overhunting as the turtle would have been an easy, slow-moving target which could have been stored for quite some time.

== Material culture ==
H. erectus arrived in Eurasia approximately 1.8 million years ago, in an event considered to be the first African exodus. There is evidence that the Java population of H. erectus lived in an ever-wet forest habitat. More specifically the environment resembled a savannah, but was likely regularly inundated ("hydromorphic savanna"). The plants found at the Trinil excavation site included grass (Poaceae), ferns, Ficus, and Indigofera, which are typical of lowland rainforest.

=== Control of fire ===
The control of fire by Homo erectus is generally accepted by archaeologists to have begun some 400,000 years ago, with claims regarding earlier evidence finding increasing scientific support. Burned wood has been found in layers that carried the Java Man fossils in Trinil, dating to around from 500,000 to 830,000 BP. However, because Central Java is a volcanic region, the charring may have resulted from natural fires, and there is no conclusive proof that Homo erectus in Java controlled fire. It has been proposed that frequent natural fires may have allowed Java Man "opportunistic use [... that] did not create an archeologically visible pattern".

== See also ==
- Anthropopithecus
- List of fossil sites (with link directory)
- Sundaland: Pleistocene Java was part of this large peninsula attached to the Asian continent
- Trinil tiger: an extinct mammal found in the same site as Java Man
- Meganthropus: the mysterious giant Java man whose fossils were found in Sangiran

== Works cited ==
- Boaz, Noel T.; Ciochon, Russell L. (2004), Dragon Bone Hill: An Ice-Age Saga of Homo Erectus, Oxford and New York: Oxford University Press, ISBN 978-0-19-515291-3.
- Ciochon, Russell L. (2010), "Divorcing Hominins from the Stegodon–Ailuropoda Fauna: New Views on the Antiquity of Hominins in Asia", in John G. Fleagle; et al. (eds.), Out of Africa I: The First Hominin Colonization of Eurasia, Vertebrate Paleobiology and Paleoanthropology Series, Dordrecht: Springer, pp. 111–26, doi:10.1007/978-90-481-9036-2_8, ISBN 978-90-481-9035-5. ISBN 978-90-481-9036-2 (online).
- Delisle, Richard G. (2007), Debating Humankind's Place in Nature, 1860–2000: The Nature of Paleoanthropology, Advances in Human Evolution Series, Upper Saddle River (NJ): Pearson Prentice Hall, ISBN 978-0-13-177390-5.
- Dennell, Robin. (2009), The Palaeolithic Settlement of Asia, Cambridge World Archaeology, Cambridge: Cambridge University Press, ISBN 978-0-521-84866-4. ISBN 978-0-521-61310-1 (paperback).
- Dennell, Robin (2010), "'Out of Africa I': Current Problems and Future Prospects", in John G. Fleagle; et al. (eds.), Out of Africa I: The First Hominin Colonization of Eurasia, Vertebrate Paleobiology and Paleoanthropology Series, Dordrecht: Springer, pp. 247–74, doi:10.1007/978-90-481-9036-2_15, ISBN 978-90-481-9035-5. ISBN 978-90-481-9036-2 (online).
- Gould, Stephen Jay. (1993), Eight Little Piggies: Reflections in Natural History, New York and London: W. W. Norton & Company, ISBN 978-0-393-03416-5.
- Hetherington, Renée; Reid, Robert G. B. (2010), The Climate Connection: Climate Change and Modern Human Evolution, Cambridge and New York: Cambridge University Press, ISBN 978-0-521-19770-0. ISBN 978-0-521-14723-1 (paperback).
- Huffman, O. Frank; Zaim, Y.; Kappelman, J.; Ruez, D. R. Jr.; de Vos, J.; Rizal, Y.; et al. (2006), "Relocation of the 1936 Mojokerto skull discovery site near Perning, East Java", Journal of Human Evolution, 50 (4): 431–51, Bibcode:2006JHumE..50..431H, CiteSeerX 10.1.1.468.1840, doi:10.1016/j.jhevol.2005.11.002, PMID 16386780.
- Kaifu, Yousuke; Indriati, Etty; Aziz, Fachroel; Kurniawan, Iwan; Baba, Hisao (2010), "Cranial Morphology and Variation of the Earliest Indonesian Hominids", in Christopher J. Norton; David R. Braun (eds.), Asian Paleoanthropology: From Africa to China and Beyond, Vertebrate Paleobiology and Paleoanthropology Series, Dordrecht: Springer, pp. 143–57, doi:10.1007/978-90-481-9094-2_11, ISBN 978-90-481-9093-5, (online)
- Mayr, Ernst. (1950), "Taxonomic Categories in Fossil Hominids", Cold Spring Harbor Symposia on Quantitative Biology, 15: 109–18, doi:10.1101/sqb.1950.015.01.013, PMID 14942702.
- Morwood, Michael J.; O'Sullivan, P.; Susanto, E. E.; Aziz, F. (2003), "Revised age for Mojokerto 1, an early Homo erectus cranium from East Java, Indonesia", Australian Archaeology, 57: 1–4, doi:10.1080/03122417.2003.11681757, S2CID 55510294.
- Rabett, Ryan J. (2012), Human Adaptation in the Asian Palaeolithic: Hominin Dispersal and Behaviour during the Late Quaternary, Cambridge: Cambridge University Press, ISBN 978-1-107-01829-7.
- Schmalzer, Sigrid. (2008), The People's Peking Man: Popular Science and Human Identity in Twentieth-Century China, Chicago: University of Chicago Press, ISBN 978-0-226-73859-8. ISBN 978-0-226-73860-4 (paperback).
- Schwartz, Jeffrey H. (2005), The Red Ape: Orangutans and Human Origins, Cambridge, MA: Westview, ISBN 978-0-8133-4064-7.
- Swisher, Carl C. III; Curtis, Garniss H.; Lewin, Roger (2000), Java Man: How Two Geologists Changed Our Understanding of Human Evolution, Chicago: University of Chicago Press, ISBN 978-0-226-78734-3.
- Swisher, Carl C. III; Curtis, Garniss H.; Jacob, Teuku; Getty, A. G.; Suprijo, A.; Widiasmoro (25 February 1994), "Age of the earliest known hominin in Java, Indonesia", Science, 263 (5150): 1118–21, Bibcode:1994Sci...263.1118S, doi:10.1126/science.8108729, PMID 8108729, archived from the original on 2014-07-14 – via HighBeam Research.
- Theunissen, Bert (1989), Eugène Dubois and the Ape-Man from Java, Boston: Kluwer Academic Publishers, ISBN 978-1-55608-081-4. ISBN 1-55608-082-4 (paperback).
- de Vos, John. (2004), "The Dubois collection: a new look at an old collection", Scripta Geologica, 4: 267–85, ISSN 0922-4564.
- de Vos, John; Sartono, S.; Hardjasasmita, S.; Sondaar, P. Y. (1982), "The fauna from Trinil, type locality of Homo erectus: a reinterpretation", Geologie en Mijnbouw, 61: 207–11.
- de Vos, John; Sondaar, P. Y. (1994), "Dating hominid sites in Indonesia", Science, 266 (5191): 1726–27, Bibcode:1994Sci...266.1726D, doi:10.1126/science.7992059, PMID 7992059.
- Zaim, Yahdi (2010), "Geological Evidence for the Earliest Appearance of Hominins in Indonesia", in John G. Fleagle; et al. (eds.), Out of Africa I: The First Hominin Colonization of Eurasia, Vertebrate Paleobiology and Paleoanthropology Series, Dordrecht: Springer, pp. 97–110, doi:10.1007/978-90-481-9036-2_7, ISBN 978-90-481-9035-5, (online)
