= Mojokerto child =

Hominin fossil

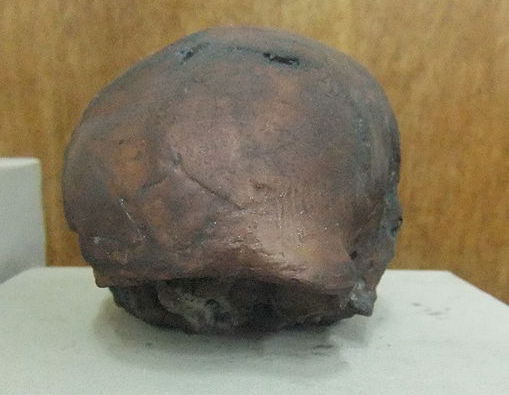
- Catalog no.: Mojokerto 1 Perning 1
- Common name: Mojokerto child
- Species: Homo erectus
- Age: 1.43–1.49 million years
- Place discovered: Mojokerto, Indonesia
- Date discovered: 1936
- Discovered by: Andojo; Ralph von Koenigswald

The Mojokerto child, also known as Mojokerto 1 and Perning 1, is the fossilized skullcap of a juvenile early human. It was discovered in February 1936 near Mojokerto (East Java, Indonesia) by a member of an excavation team led by Ralph von Koenigswald. Von Koenigswald first called the specimen Pithecanthropus modjokertensis but soon renamed it Homo modjokertensis because Eugène Dubois – the discoverer of Java Man, which was then called Pithecanthropus erectus – disagreed that the new fossil was a Pithecanthropus. The skullcap is now identified as belonging to the species Homo erectus.

The Mojokerto child has been the most controversial of the early human fossils that have been found in Indonesia. Its date and even the exact site of its discovery have been widely disputed. First thought to be less than 1.00 Ma (million years old), in 1994 it was claimed, based on argon–argon dating, which was then a new dating method, that the skull was around 1.81 Ma old. The authors of the paper, Carl C. Swisher III and Garniss Curtis, argued that this date had wide implications for our understanding of the first human migrations "Out of Africa". In the early 2000s, however, new archival and scientific research identified the precise layer from which the fossil was excavated in 1936 and showed conclusively that the fossil's earliest possible date was 1.49 Ma.

== Discovery and names ==
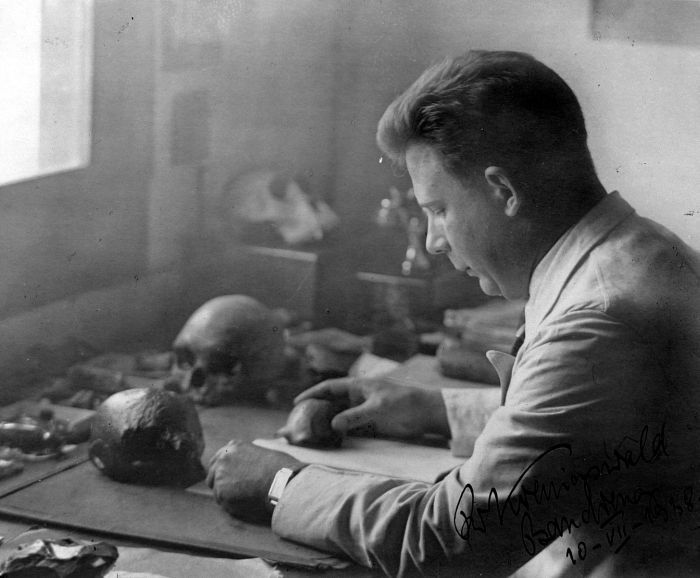
G.H.R. von Koenigswald (1902–1982), whose team discovered the Mojokerto child

The fossilized skullcap was discovered in February 1936 by Andojo – sometimes referred to as Tjokrohandojo or Andoyo – an Indonesian who worked at excavating animal fossils in the Kendeng Hills (Pegunungan Kendeng) in East Java on a team led by Ralph von Koenigswald. Andojo originally believed the skull belonged to an orangutan, but von Koenigswald immediately recognized it as human. He named it Pithecanthropus modjokertensis after the nearby town of Mojokerto, which was then spelled "Modjokerto". Eugène Dubois, who had discovered Java Man in the 1890s and named it Pithecanthropus erectus, wrote to von Koenigswald arguing that if the Mojokerto fossil were indeed human, then it could not be a Pithecanthropus (lit., an "ape-man"). Von Koenigswald thus renamed his fossil Homo modjokertensis. It was eventually classified as Homo erectus just like "Java Man" and the numerous early human fossils that von Koenigswald and others found in Sangiran. In Indonesia, the fossil is known as Pithecanthropus modjokertensis.

The fossil's two catalog names "Mojokerto 1" and "Perning 1" come from the town of Mojokerto, which is about 10 kilometres (6 mi) southwest of the site, and from the little village of Perning, which is 10 kilometres (6.2 mi) northeast of Mojokerto and 3.5 kilometres (2.2 mi) south of the site.

== Controversial date ==
For decades, the Mojokerto child, whose gender is unknown, was considered non-datable, because the exact site where it was found could not be clearly determined. By 1985, four different locations had been proposed as the possible site of discovery. It was also unclear whether the fossil had been excavated or found on the surface, making dating difficult even if the site itself became certain.

In the early 1990s, geochronologist Garniss Curtis and paleontologist Carl C. Swisher III used the argon–argon dating method to propose a date of 1.81 ± 0.04 Ma for the fossil, that is, 1.81 million years ago, with a margin of error of plus or minus 40,000 years. Their rock sample – "hornblende grains from volcanic pumice that appeared to match the filling of the skull" – came from a site shown to them in 1990 by Teuku Jacob, an Indonesian paleoanthropologist who had studied under Ralph von Koenigswald. Swisher and Curtis announced their findings in a paper that was published in Science magazine in 1994.

The fossil's unexpectedly old age was announced in at least 221 newspapers – including on the front page of The New York Times – and prompted cover stories in Discover, New Scientist, and Time magazines. Swisher and Curtis's conclusion was hotly debated, because it meant that the Mojokerto child was as old as the oldest known specimens of African Homo ergaster (also called Homo erectus sensu lato), suggesting that Homo erectus could have left Africa much earlier than thought, or even evolved in Southeast Asia rather than Africa as most scientists had assumed. Few critics questioned the dating method, but several objected that, considering the uncertainty surrounding the fossil's discovery site, it was unclear whether the rock samples used for dating had been taken from the right location.

In 2003, a paper published by a team led by archeologist Mike Morwood presented 1.49 ± 0.13 Ma as the latest possible date, based on "fission-track dating of single zircon grains". Morwood argued that the rock samples Curtis and Swisher dated came from a pumice bed located 20 metres (66 ft) below the one above which the Mojokerto skullcap was found. The geological horizon immediately under the fossil – Morwood calls it "Pumice Horizon 5" – dates back to 1.49 Ma, whereas the one just above – "Pumice Horizon 6" – dates from 1.43 ± 0.1 Ma. In 2006, Australian archeologist Frank Huffman used pictures and fieldnotes from the 1930s to identify the exact site of the excavation and confirmed that the fossil was indeed found between the two layers that Morwood had dated. Morwood's and Huffman's conclusions have been widely accepted.
