= Prehistoric Indonesia =

Prehistoric Indonesia is a prehistoric period in the Indonesian archipelago that spanned from the Pleistocene period to about the 4th century CE when the Kutai people produced the earliest known stone inscriptions in Indonesia. Unlike the clear distinction between prehistoric and historical periods in Europe and the Middle East, the division is muddled in Indonesia. This is mostly because Indonesia's geographical conditions as a vast archipelago caused some parts — especially the interiors of distant islands — to be virtually isolated from the rest of the world. West Java and coastal Eastern Borneo, for example, began their historical periods in the early 4th century, but megalithic culture still flourished and script was unknown in the rest of Indonesia, including in Nias and Toraja. The Papuans on the Indonesian part of New Guinea island lived virtually in the Stone Age until their first contacts with modern world in the early 20th century. Even today living megalithic traditions still can be found on the island of Sumba and Nias.

== Geology ==
During the last ice age, the Indonesian archipelago was part of two large landmasses: the western parts were connected to Asia, the eastern parts to Australia.

Geologically, the area of modern Indonesia appeared from under the Southeast Asian seas as the result of the Indian and Australian plates colliding and slipping under the Sunda Plate, sometime in the early Cenozoic era around 63 million years ago. This tectonic collision created the Sunda volcanic Arc that has produced the chains of islands of Sumatra, Java and the Lesser Sunda Islands. The active volcanic arc creating supervolcano that today become Lake Toba in Sumatra. The massive eruption of the Toba supervolcano that occurred some time between 69,000 and 77,000 years ago (72,000 BCE) instigated the Toba catastrophe theory, a global volcanic winter that caused a bottleneck in human evolution. Other notable volcanoes in Sunda Arc are Mount Tambora (erupted in 1815) and Krakatau (erupted in 1883). The region is known for its instability due to volcano formations and other volcanic and tectonic activities as well as climate changes; resulted in lowlands drowned occasionally under shallow seas, the formation of islands, the connection and disconnection of islands through narrow land-bridges, etc.

The Indonesian archipelago nearly reached its present form in the Pleistocene period. For some periods, the Sundaland was still linked with Asian mainland, creating the landmass extension of Southeast Asia that enabled the migrations of some Asian animals and hominid species. Geologically the New Guinea island and the shallow seas of Arafura is the northern part of Australia tectonic plate and once connected as a land bridge identified as Sahulland. During the end of the last ice age (around 20,000–10,000 years ago), earth experienced global climate change; a global warming with the rising of average temperature caused the melting of polar ice caps and contributed to the rising of sea surface. Sundaland was submerged under shallow sea, creating Malacca Strait, South China Sea, Karimata Strait and Java Sea. During that period, Malay Peninsula, Sumatra, Java, Borneo and the islands around them were formed. On the east, New Guinea and Aru Islands were separated from the Australia mainland. The rise of sea surface created isolated areas that separated plants, animals and hominid species, causing further evolution and speciation.

== Human migration ==
=== Homo erectus ===
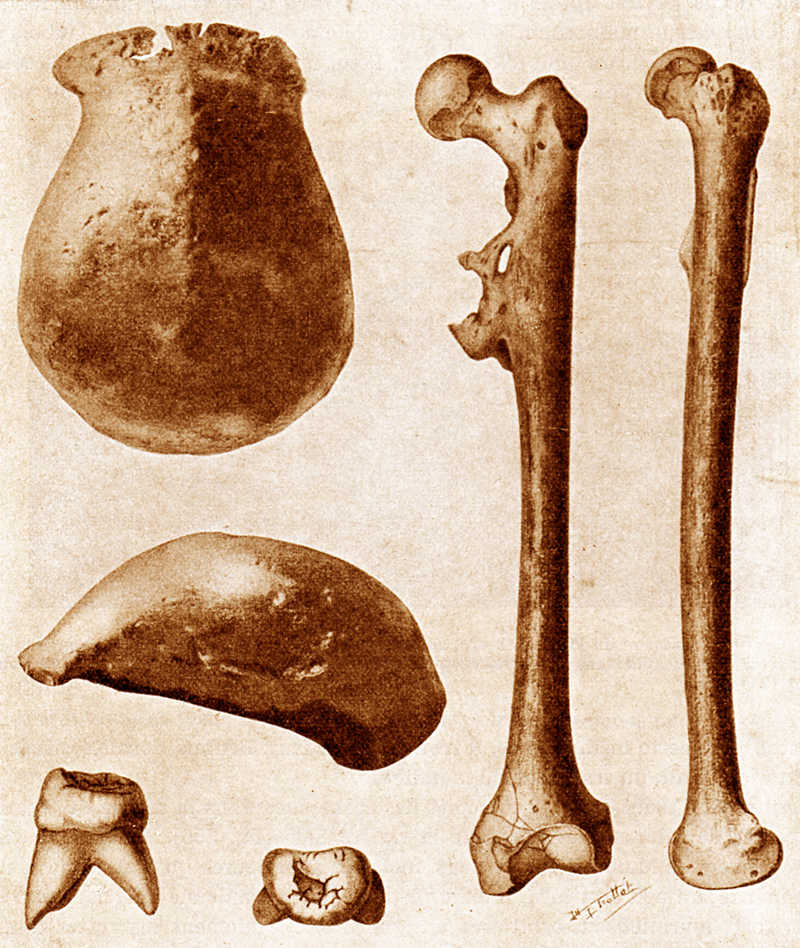
Original fossils drawing of Pithecanthropus erectus (now Homo erectus) or "Java Man" found in Java in 1891

In 2007 analysis of cut marks on two bovid bones found in Sangiran, showed them to have been made 1.5 to 1.6 million years ago by clamshell tools, and is the oldest evidence for the presence of early man in Indonesia. Fossilised remains of Homo erectus, popularly known as the "Java Man", were first discovered by the Dutch anatomist Eugène Dubois at Trinil in 1891, and are at least 700,000 years old — at that time, the oldest human ancestor ever found. Further Homo erectus fossils of a similar age were found at Sangiran in the 1930s by the anthropologist Gustav Heinrich Ralph von Koenigswald, who in the same time period also uncovered fossils at Ngandong alongside more advanced tools, re-dated in 2011 to between 550,000 and 143,000 years old. In 1977 another Homo erectus skull was discovered at Sambungmacan.

=== Homo floresiensis ===
In 2003, on the island of Flores, fossils of a new small hominid dated between 74,000 and 13,000 years old and named "Flores Man" (Homo floresiensis) were discovered, much to the surprise of the scientific community. This 3-foot-tall hominid is thought to be a species descended from Homo erectus which diminished in size over thousands of years through a well-known process called island dwarfism. Homo floresiensis was first dated to relatively recent time periods — as recent as 14,000 years ago. However, re-examination of the sediments has led to revision of these dates. These hominins have been shown to have been present in Indonesia since at least 700,000 years ago, until about 60–50,000 years ago. In 2010, stone tools were discovered on Flores dating from 1 million years ago.

=== Homo sapiens ===
The archipelago was formed during the thaw after the latest ice age. Early humans travelled by sea and spread from mainland Asia eastward to New Guinea and Australia. Homo sapiens reached the region by around 45,000 years ago. In 2011 evidence was uncovered in neighbouring East Timor, showing that 42,000 years ago these early settlers had high-level maritime skills, and by implication the technology needed to make ocean crossings to reach Australia and other islands, as they were catching and consuming large numbers of big deep-sea fish such as tuna.

==== Earliest migration ====
Early Homo sapiens reached the archipelago between 60,000 and 45,000 years ago. Many but not all Southeast Asian Homo sapiens fossils prior to about 8,000 BCE have been identified as being distinct from Austronesians. The remnants of the pre-Austronesian groups of Southeast Asia survive in isolated pockets in Malaysia (Semang) and the Philippines (Aeta). The descendants of the pre-Austronesian inhabitants of the Indonesian Archipelago are still the majority in the eastern portion of the region, in islands such as New Guinea, the Maluku and East Nusa Tenggara. Genetic studies show that in Western Papua there was significant genetic admixture between Negritos, Australo-Melanesians and Austronesians.

==== Rock art ====
Approximately 40,000 years ago, early humans produced prehistoric rock art motifs in volcanic caves on the island of Sulawesi. This means that humans at both extremes of the Pleistocene Eurasian world, Europe and Indonesia, were producing rock art during the same time period. The most notable rock art sites in Indonesia are the Maros-Pangkep rock art sites at the caves in South Sulawesi province. There are two distinct styles of art within these caves, both dated to the Pleistocene period. The first consists of human hand stencils, made by spraying wet pigment spit from the mouth, around human hands that were pressed against the cave wall surfaces. The second is a less common style of cave art, characterized by images drawn of larger, naturalistic profile paintings of wild land mammals that were endemic to the island during the Pleistocene period, such as miniature buffalos and warty pigs.

Other than Altamira, the Maros cave art is one of the most extensive sites of cave rock art in the world. These Indonesian prehistoric cave paintings might be the oldest cave art in the world. This find has challenged the established interpretation that Europe was the birthplace of prehistoric rock art.

On 11 December 2019, a team of researchers led by Dr. Maxime Aubert announced the discovery of the oldest hunting scenes in prehistoric art in the world which is more than 44,000 years old from the limestone cave of Leang Bulu' Sipong 4. Archaeologists determined the age of the depiction of hunting a pig and buffalo thanks to the calcite 'popcorn', different isotope levels of radioactive uranium and thorium.

On 16 March 2020, a team of archaeologists led by Griffith University has uncovered the first known examples of 'portable art', which are probably 14,000 - 26,000 years old, from a limestone cave named Leang Bulu Bettue in Sulawesi and published in the academic journal Nature Human Behaviour. While one of the stones contained an anoa (water buffalo) and what may be a flower, star or eye, another depicted an astronomic rays of light.

In January 2021, archaeologists announced the discovery of at least 45,500 years old cave art in Leang Tedongnge cave. According to the journal Science Advances, cave painting of warty pig is the earliest evidence of human settlement of the region. Adult male pig, measuring 136 cm x 54 cm, was depicted with horn-like facial warts and two hand prints above its hindquarters. According to co-author Adam Brumm, there are two other pigs that are partly preserved and it appears, the wart pig was observing a fight between two of them.

==== Prehistoric jewelry ====
Ornaments made from bones and teeth of babirusa deer-pig and bear cuscuses (Ailurops ursinus) marsupial, was unearthed from limestone caves in Sulawesi. These jewellery was ingeniously manufactured from the teeth of the primitive pigs and bones of marsupials, estimated dated to between 22,000 and 30,000 years ago.

==== Austroasiatic migration and admixture ====
Negritos and Australo-Melanesians dominated most of the Indonesian archipelago until 6,300 years ago, when two massive human migrations from Indochina swayed the demographics of the archipelago. Scientists suggest that there were two major migratory flows into the archipelago that were ancestral to modern Indonesians. First, Austroasiatic speakers arrived around 6,300-5,000 years ago, and then, Austronesian speakers arrived around 4,000 years ago.

Austroasiatic people spread via Indochina, from Yunnan in Southern China to Vietnam and Cambodia, then to the Malay Peninsula before finally arriving in Sumatra, Borneo and Java. Genetic studies show that Javanese, Sundanese and Balinese people have significant proportion of Austroasiatic ancestry.

Genome studies show that several ethnic groups in western Indonesian archipelago have significant Austroasiatic genome markers, despite none of these groups speaking Austroasiatic languages. Thus this could mean, that there was either once a substantial Austroasiatic presence in Island Southeast Asia, or Austronesian speakers migrated to and through the mainland. The substantial presence of Austroasiatic ancestry in western Indonesian archipelago suggests that the western branch of Austroasiatic migration from Indochina might have taken place in pre-Neolithic era. The contesting suggestion argues for Austroasiatic-Austronesian admixture — which probably took place in the Malay Peninsula or southern Vietnam, intermixing there before continuing to western Indonesia.

==== Austronesian migration and expansion ====
Austronesian speakers came to Indonesian archipelago circa 4,000 years ago. Both Austroasiatic and Austronesian branched from Southern China. However, unlike Austroasiatic people that spread south through the continent, the Austronesian group developed in Taiwan and spread by island hopping throughout the region.

Austronesian expansion began 4,000–5,000 years ago, and likely had its roots in Taiwan. The sea-faring Austronesian people sailed through the region and performed island-hopping — from Taiwan south through the Philippines Archipelago - and reached the central Indonesian archipelago. From there they expanded to western Indonesia and eastern Indonesia, where they met earlier inhabitant Australoid people. In addition, the western branch arrived in Borneo, Java and Sumatra where it met the Austroasiatic migrants, in addition to the existing Australoid population.

Austronesian soon become the dominant group replacing the Australoid population, that today remains significantly only in the Eastern region. On the other hand, Austronesian successfully influenced the Austroasiatic speakers, so finally all of the population in the Western Indonesian archipelago became Austronesian speakers, despite some ethnic groups (Javanese, Sundanese, and Balinese) showing significant Austroasiatic genetic markers. Genome studies discovered that the inhabitants of central and eastern Indonesian archipelago have a significant Austronesian ancestry.

Around 2,000 BCE there was an expansion of seafaring Austronesians from Asia, who spread throughout Maritime Southeast Asia all the way to Oceania and in later period reached Madagascar. Austronesian people form the majority of the modern population of Indonesia.

== Chronology ==
=== Paleolithic ===
Homo erectus were known to utilise simple coarse paleolithic stone tools and also shell tools, discovered in Sangiran and Ngandong. Cut mark analysis of Pleistocene mammalian fossils documents 18 cut marks inflicted by tools of thick clamshell flakes on two bovid bones created during butchery at the Pucangan Formation in Sangiran between 1.6 and 1.5 million years ago. These cut marks document the use of the first tools in Sangiran and the oldest evidence of shell tool use in the world.

=== Neolithic ===
The polished stone tools of Neolithic culture, such as polished stone axes and stone hoes, were developed by the Austronesian people in the Indonesian archipelago. Also during the Neolithic period, large stone structures of the megalithic culture flourished in archipelago.

=== Megalithic ===
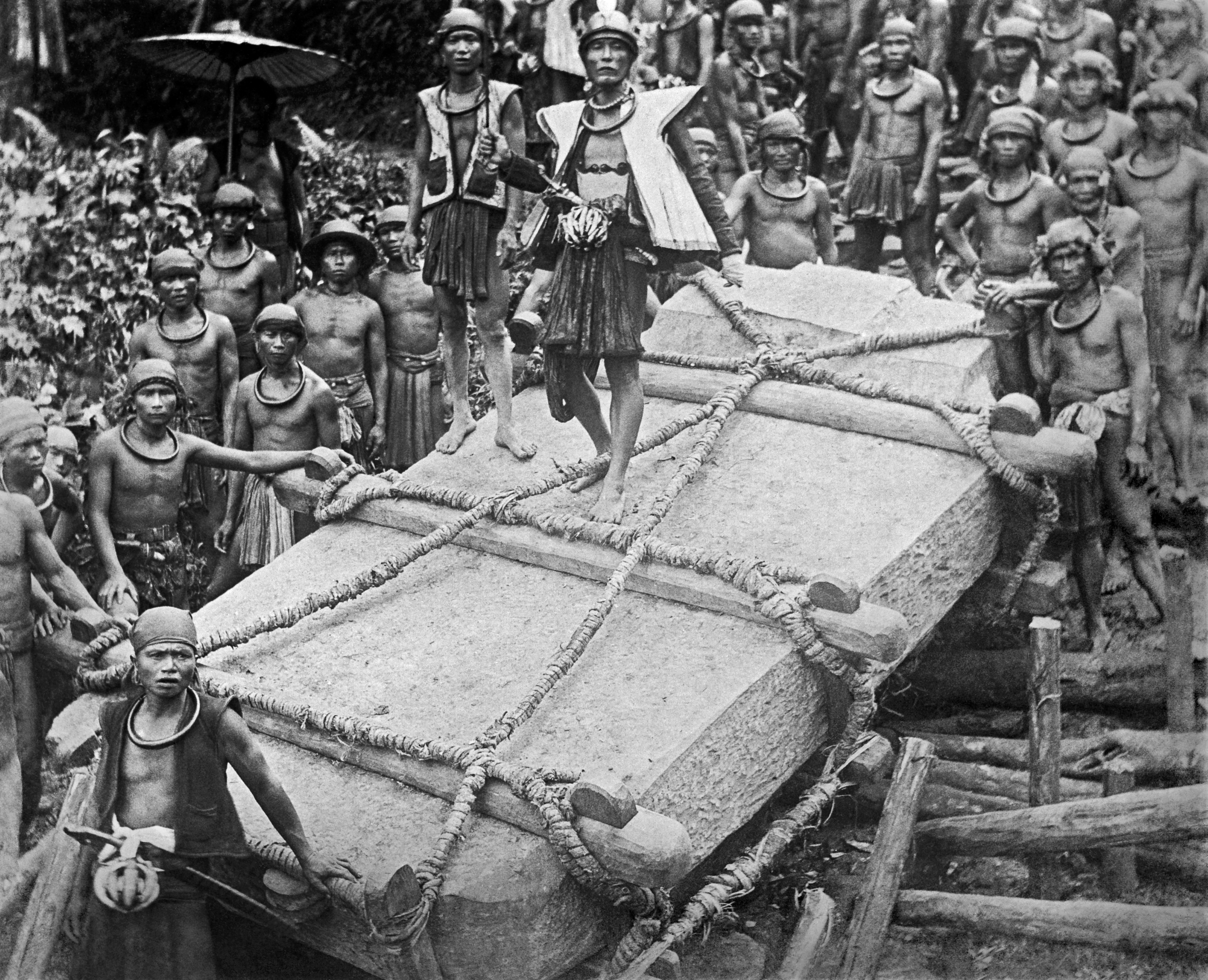
People on Nias Island in Indonesia move a megalith to a construction site, circa 1915. Digitally restored.

The Indonesian archipelago is the host of Austronesian megalith cultures, both past and present. Several megalith sites and structures are also found across Indonesia. Menhirs, dolmens, stone tables, ancestral stone statues, and a step pyramid structure called Punden Berundak were discovered in various sites in Java, Sumatra, Sulawesi, and the Lesser Sunda Islands.

The Cipari megalith site in West Java displayed monolith, stone terraces, and sarcophagus. The Punden step pyramid is believed to be the predecessor of later Hindu-Buddhist temples in Java. The 8th century Borobudur and 15th-century Candi Sukuh featured a step-pyramid structure.

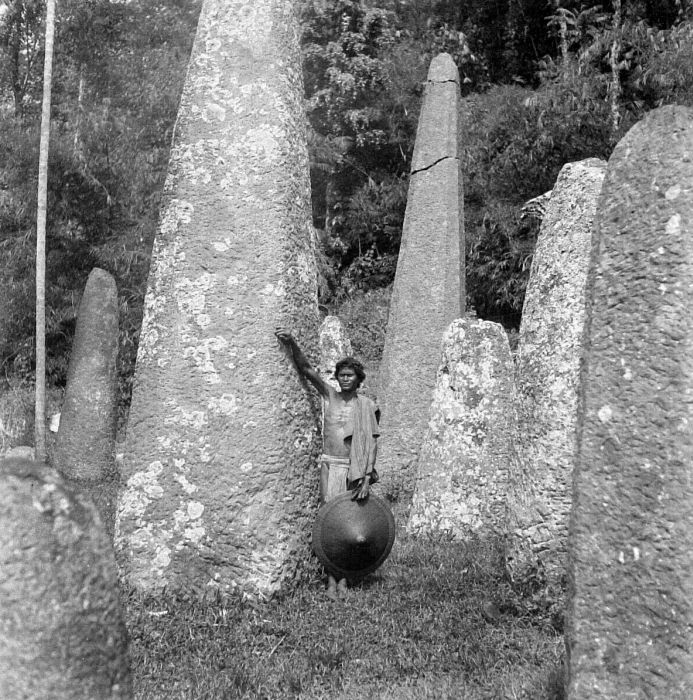
Toraja monolith, circa 1935.

Lore Lindu National Park in Central Sulawesi houses ancient megalith relics, such as ancestral stone statues, mostly located in the Bada, Besoa and Napu valleys.

Living megalith cultures can be found on Nias, an isolated island off the western coast of North Sumatra, in the interior of North Sumatra (the Batak people), on Sumba island in East Nusa Tenggara, and in the interior of South Sulawesi (the Toraja people). These megalithic cultures remained preserved, isolated and undisturbed well into the late 19th century.

=== Metal Age ===
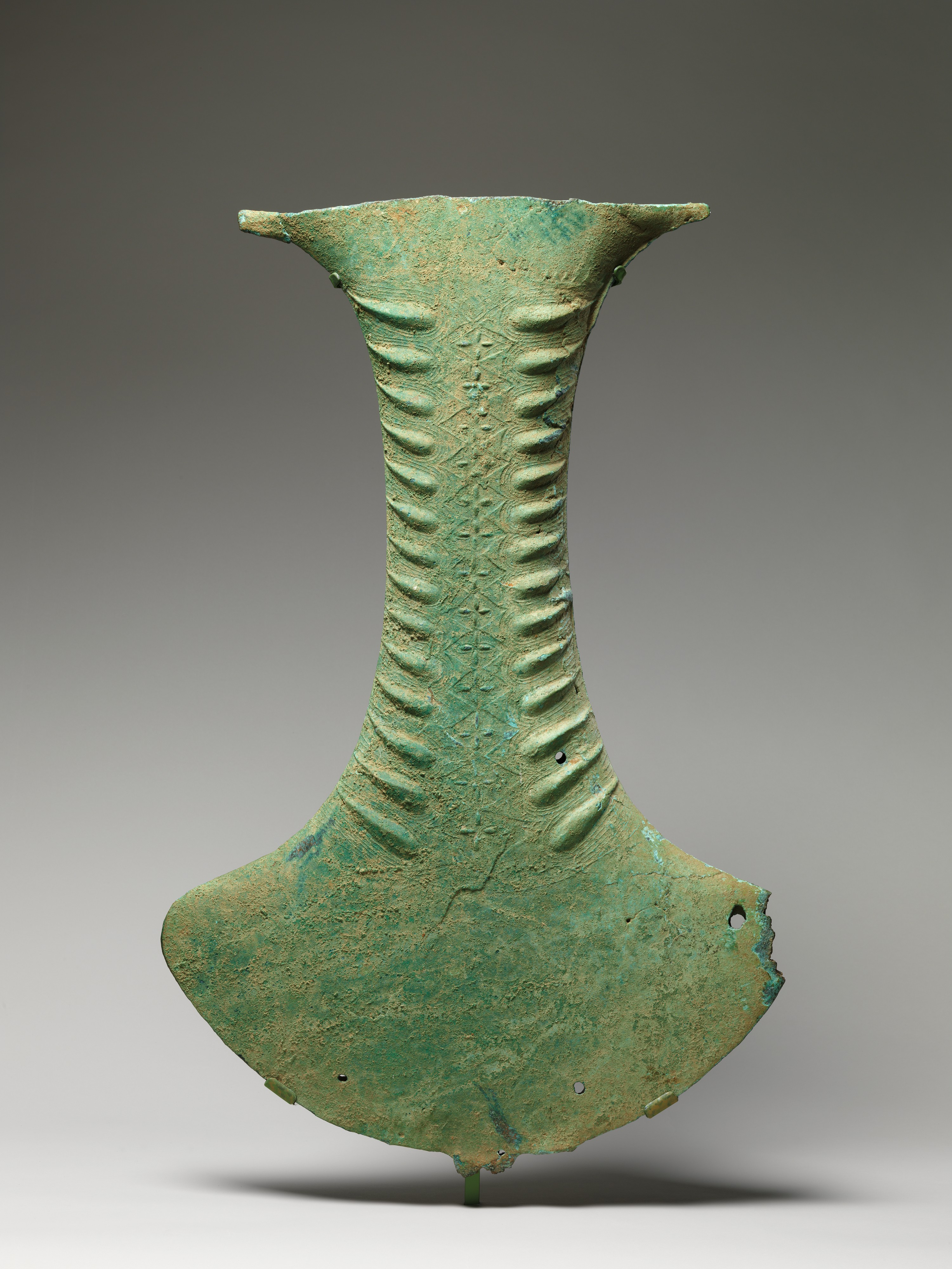
Large ceremonial bronze axe (105.1 cm x 67.3 cm), Metropolitan Museum of Art.

Dong Son culture spread to Indonesia, bringing with it techniques of bronze casting, wet-field rice cultivation, ritual buffalo sacrifice, megalithic practices, and ikat weaving methods. Some of these practices remain in areas including the Batak areas of Sumatra, Toraja in Sulawesi, and several islands in Nusa Tenggara. The artefacts from this period are Nekara bronze drums discovered throughout Indonesian archipelago, and also ceremonial bronze axe.

== Belief system ==
Early Indonesians were animists who honoured the spirits of nature as well as the ancestral spirits of the dead, as they believed their souls or life force could still help the living. The reverence for ancestral spirits is still widespread among Indonesian native ethnicities; such as among Nias people, Batak, Dayak, Toraja, and Papuans. These reverence among others are evident through the harvest festivals that often invoked the nature spirits and agriculture deities, to the elaborate burial rituals and processions of the deceased elders to preparing and sending them to the realm of ancestors. The prehistoric spirit of ancestors or nature that possess supernatural abilities is identified as hyang in Java and Bali, and still revered in Balinese Hinduism.

== Way of life ==
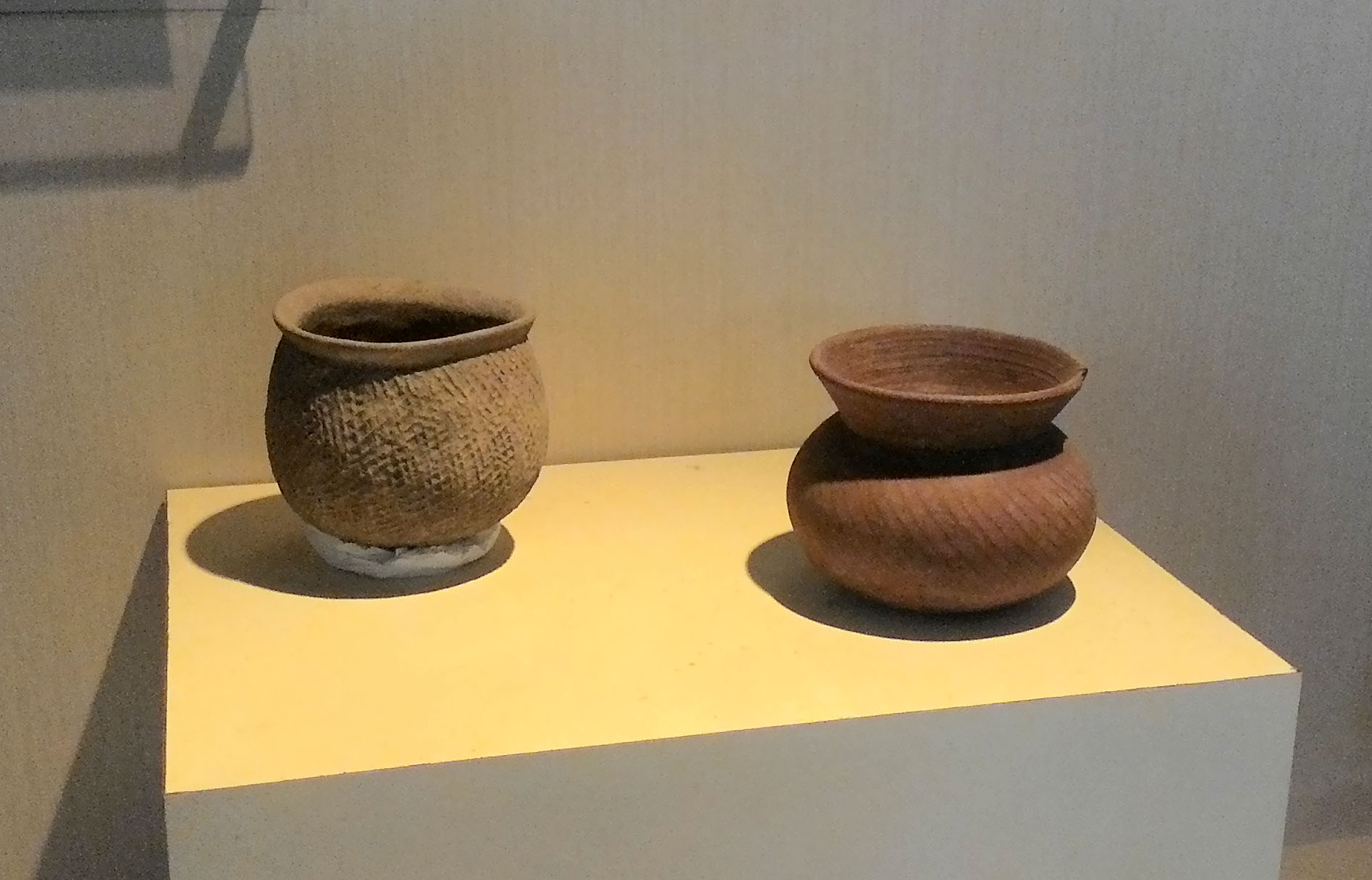
Pottery of Buni culture, West Java.

The human livelihood of prehistoric Indonesia ranges from simple forest hunter-gatherers equipped with stone tools to elaborated agriculture society employing grain cultivation, domesticated animals, weaving, and pottery industry.

Ideal agricultural conditions and the mastering of wet-field rice cultivation as early as the 8th century BCE allowed villages, towns, and small kingdoms to flourish by the 1st century CE. These kingdoms (little more than collections of villages subservient to petty chieftains) evolved with their own ethnic and tribal religions. Java's hot and even temperature, abundant rain, and volcanic soil was perfect for wet rice cultivation. Such agriculture required a well-organised society, in contrast to the lower level of social complexity required by dry-field rice cultivation.

Buni culture clay pottery flourished in coastal northern West Java and Banten around 400 BCE to 100 CE. Buni culture was probably the predecessor of the Tarumanagara kingdom, one of the earliest Hindu kingdoms in Indonesia, which produced numerous inscriptions, marking the beginning of the historical period in Java.

== List of sites ==
Prehistoric relics, such as bones of prehistoric animals and hominids, megalithic monolith such as menhirs, dolmens, statues, burial sites, and paintings in caves cliff niches, include the following:

- Putri cave, Baturaja, South Sumatra
- Pasemah prehistoric site, Lampung
- Caves of Sangkulirang Hill, East Kutai Regency, East Kalimantan
- Lebak Cibedug prehistoric site, Banten
- Pangguyangan megalithic sites, Cisolok, Sukabumi Regency, West Java
- Cipari megalithic site, Kuningan, West Java
- Pawon caves, Bandung Regency, West Java
- Gunung Padang Megalithic Site, Cianjur Regency, West Java
- Sangiran valley, Central Java
- Wajak prehistoric sites, Tulungagung Regency, East Java
- Mbolu village prehistoric site, Ngepo village, Tanggunggunung subdistrict, Tulungagung Regency, East Java
- Gilimanuk prehistoric site, Jembrana Regency, Bali
- Keramas village prehistoric site, Blahbatuh subdistrict, Gianyar regency, Bali
- Leang-leang caves, Maros Regency, South Sulawesi
- Megalithic statues of Lore Lindu National Park, Central Sulawesi
- Liang Bua, Flores, East Nusa Tenggara
- Biak caves prehistoric sites, Biak, Papua (40.000-30.000 SM)
- Beach side prehistoric painting site, Raja Ampat, West Papua
- Tutari megalithic sites, Jayapura, Papua
- Babi caves, Mount Batu Buli, Randu village, Muara Uya, Tabalong, South Kalimantan

== See also ==
- List of human evolution fossils

== Notes ==
- Moore, MW; Brumm (2007). "Stone artifacts and hominins in island Southeast Asia: New insights from Flores, eastern Indonesia". Journal of Human Evolution. 52 (1): 85–102. Bibcode:2007JHumE..52...85M. doi:10.1016/j.jhevol.2006.08.002. PMID 17069874.
