= Sangiran =

Archaeological excavation site in Java in Indonesia

Sangiran Early Man Site
UNESCO World Heritage Site
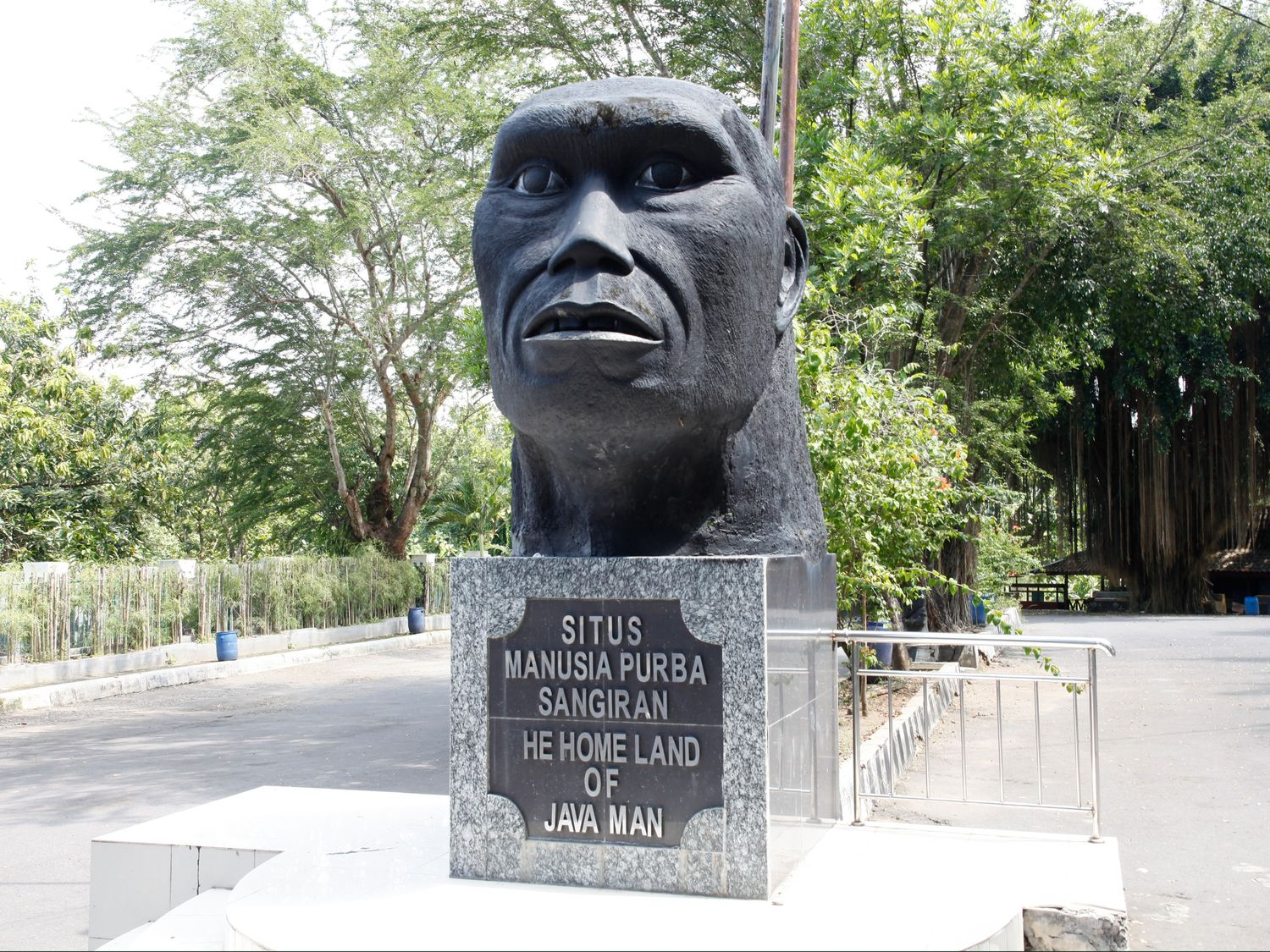
- Sangiran Early Man Site. At the centre: reconstructed statue of Java Man.

- Location within Indonesia
- Interactive map of Sangiran Early Man Site
- Location: Indonesia
- Criteria: Cultural: iii, vi
- Reference: 593
- Inscription: 1996 (20th Session)
- Area: 5,600 ha (14,000 acres)
- Coordinates: 7°27′S 110°50′E

Sangiran is an archaeological excavation site in Java in Indonesia. According to a UNESCO report (1995) "Sangiran is recognized by scientists to be one of the most important sites in the world for studying fossil man, ranking alongside Zhoukoudian (China), Willandra Lakes (Australia), Olduvai Gorge (Tanzania), and Sterkfontein (South Africa), and more fruitful in finds than any of these."

The area comprises about 56 km^{2} (7 km x 8 km). It is located in Central Java, about 15 kilometers north of Surakarta in the Solo River valley. Administratively, Sangiran area is divided between 2 regencies: Sragen (districts of Gemolong, Kalijambe, and Plupuh) and Karanganyar (district of Gondangrejo). An important feature of the site is the geology of the area. Originally a dome was created millions of years ago through tectonic uplifts. The dome was then eroded exposing beds within the dome which are rich in archeological records.

== History ==
- 1883: The Dutch paleoanthropologist Eugène Dubois undertook preliminary fieldwork at Sangiran. However, Dubois did not find many fossils of interest so he shifted his attention to Trinil in East Java where he found significant discoveries.
- 1934: The anthropologist Gustav Heinrich Ralph von Koenigswald started to examine the area. During excavations in the next years fossils of some of the first known human ancestors, Pithecanthropus erectus ("Java Man", now reclassified as part of the species Homo erectus), were found here. About 60 more human fossils, among them the enigmatic "Meganthropus", have since been found. Sangiran 2, for example, was discovered by von Koenigswald at the site. In addition, there are considerable numbers of remains of the animals that these primitive humans hunted, and of others that merely shared the habitat.
- 1977: The Indonesian Government designated an area of 56 km2 around Sangiran as a Daerah Cagar Budaya (Protected Cultural Area).
- 1988: A modest local site museum and conservation laboratory were set up at Sangiran.
- 1996: UNESCO registered Sangiran as a World Heritage Site on the World Heritage List as the Sangiran Early Man Site.
- 2011: The current museum and visitors' centre was opened by the Minister for Education and Culture on 15 December.
- 2012: President Susilo Bambang Yudhoyono visited the museum in February accompanied by 11 cabinet ministers.

Over time, following the initial work by Dubois and von Koenigswald at Sangiran, other scholars including Indonesian archeologists undertook work at the site. Indonesian scholars included Teuku Jacob, Etty Indriati, Sartono, Fachroel Aziz, Harry Widianto, Yahdi Zaim, and Johan Arif.

== Museum ==
Sangiran Early Man Museum
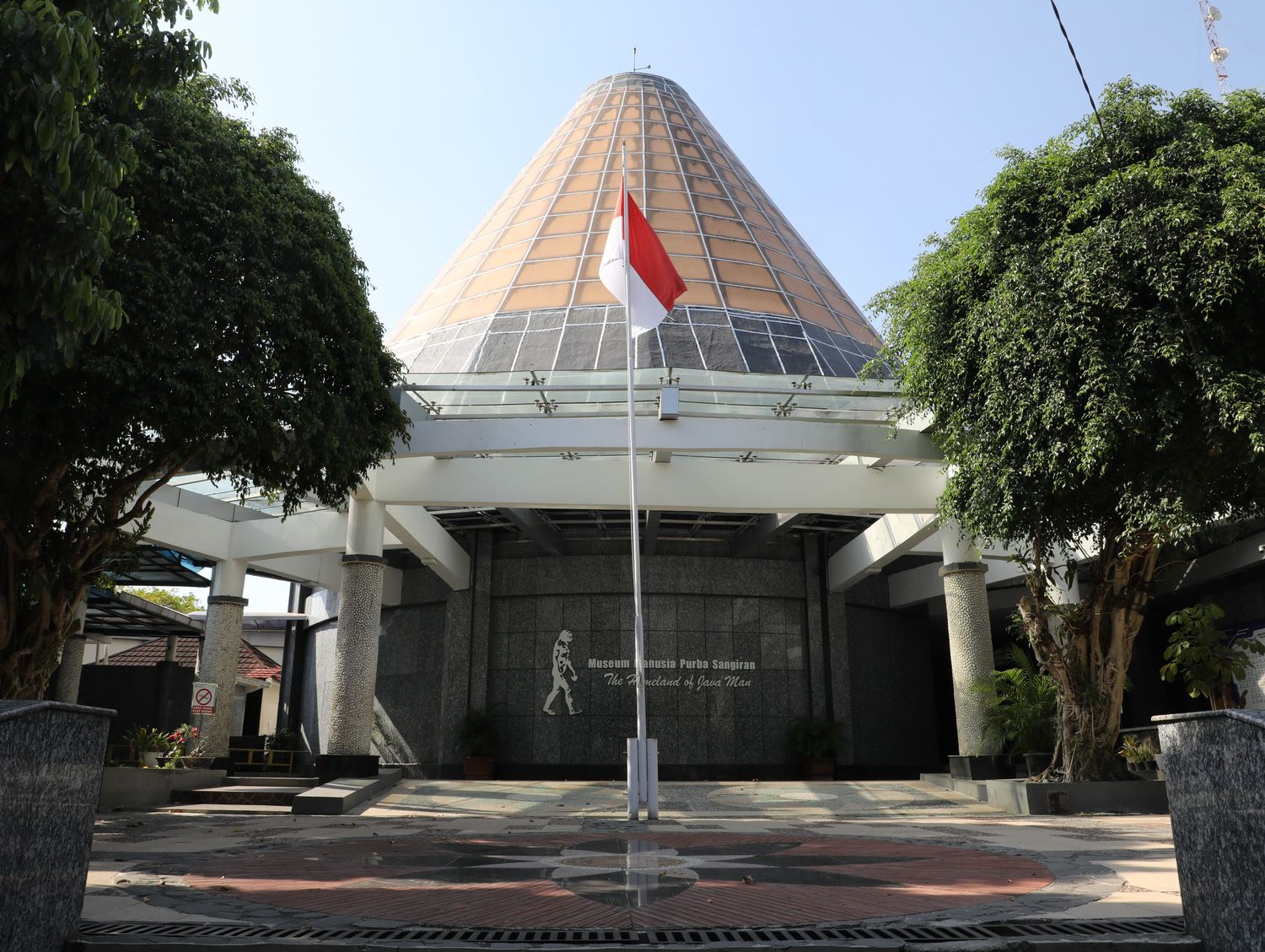
- Sangiran Early Man Museum in 2024
- Location: Sragen Regency and Karanganyar Regency, Central Java
- Type: Museums of archaeology
- Owner: Ministry of Culture (Indonesia Heritage Agency)
- Website: iha.kemenbud.go.id/en/portfolio/sangiran-early-man-museum/

A modest museum existed at Sangiran for several decades before a modern, well-functioning museum and visitors' centre was opened in December 2011. The new building, a modern museum, contains three main halls with extensive displays and impressive dioramas of the Sangiran area as it was believed to be around 1 million years ago. Several other centres are under construction as well (early 2013) so that by 2014 it is expected that there will be four centres at different places within the overall Sangiran site. The four planned centres are:

- Krikilan: the existing site with the main visitors centre and museum.
- Ngebung: to contain a history of the discovery of the Sangiran site.
- Bukuran: to provide information about the discovery of prehistoric human fossils at Sangiran.
- Dayu: to present information about the latest research.

The current museum and visitors' centre has three main halls. The first hall contains several dioramas that provide information about the early humans and animals which existed at the Sangiran site around 1 million years ago. The second hall, which is more extensive, presents much detailed material about the wide variety of fossils found at Sangiran and about the history of exploration at the site. The third hall, in a separate impressive presentation, contains a large diorama which provides a sweeping view of the overall area of Sangiran, with volcanoes such as Mount Lawu in the background and humans and animals in the foreground, as it is imagined to have been around 1 million years ago. Several of the presentations in this third hall draw on the work of the internationally known paleontological sculptor Elisabeth Daynes.

== Access ==
Access to the Sangiran Museum is gained by travelling around 15 km north from Surakarta along the main road towards the central Java town of Purwodadi. The turnoff to the museum, just past the small market town of Kalioso, leads along a sealed road that winds through a relatively poor rural area for around 4 km before reaching the final short entry road to the visitors centre to the right. Total travel time from Surakarta, depending on traffic conditions along the crowded Surakarta-Purwodadi road, is about 45-60 mins. There are frequent buses along the route from Surakarta to Purwodadi which will drop passengers off at the turnoff on request. Local informal motorcycle taxi drivers will ferry visitors along the remaining 4 km for a modest charge. The museum can be reached conveniently by Trans-Java Toll Road. (The museum is open from 8.00am to 4.00pm each day except for Mondays when the museum is closed.)

== Social and other issues ==
Development of the overall Sangiran site has not been without controversy. Uncontrolled digging and illegal trade in fossils have occurred on various occasions since the site was first discovered. For a considerable period, villagers in the area frequently dug up and sold fossils to local buyers. Following the enactment of National Law No. 5 of 1992 on cultural heritage objects, there were stronger controls on these activities. However, illegal activities have sometimes continued to occur in recent years. In 2010, for example, an American citizen claiming to be a scientist was arrested near Sangiran while travelling in a truck containing 43 different types of fossils in boxes and sacks with an estimated market value of $2 million.

More recently, there has been discussion in Indonesian media about the way that the development of the Sangiran site has failed to bring any significant tangible benefits to the rural communities in the local area.

== Gallery ==
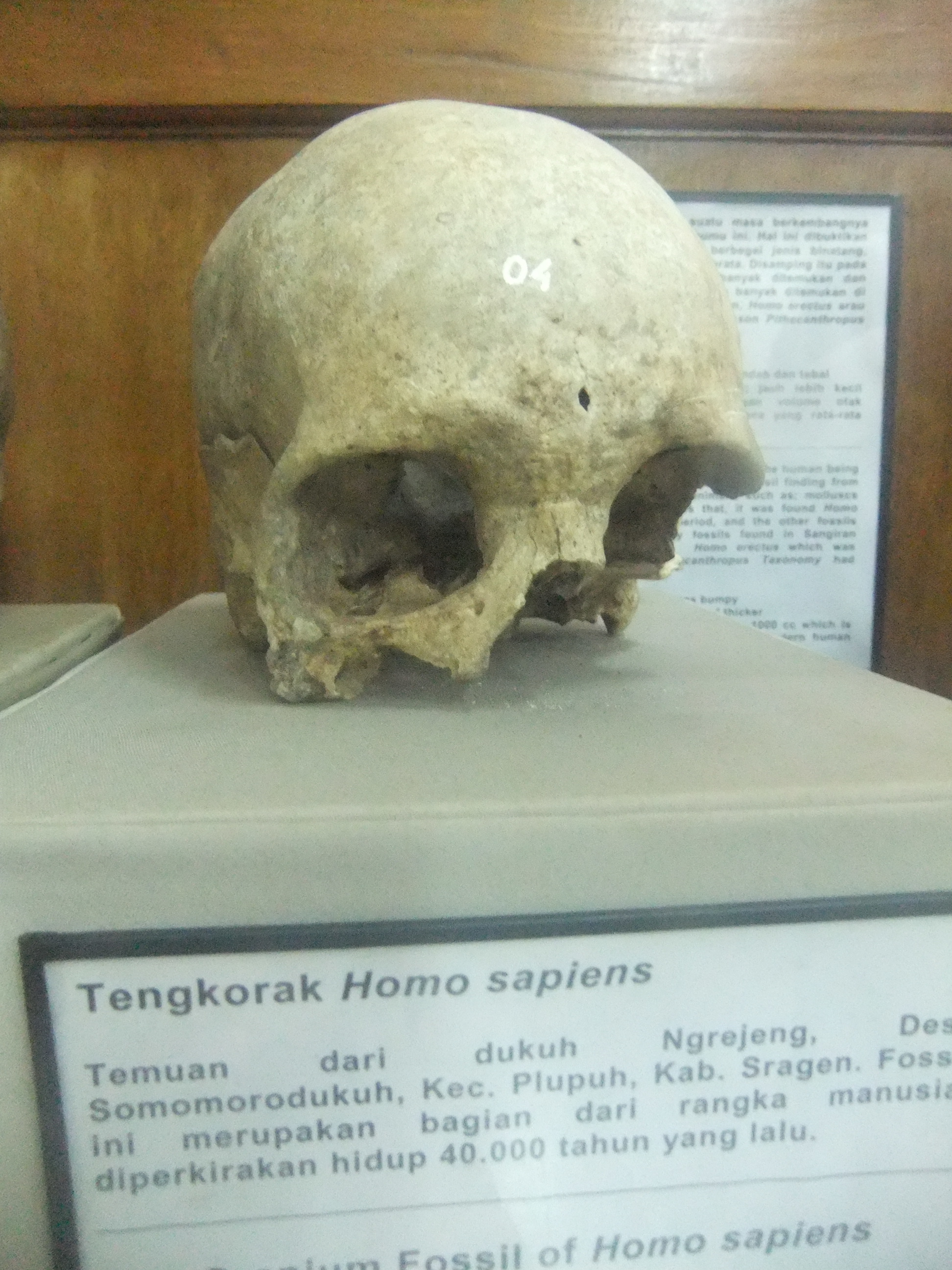
Homo sapiens Ngrejeng (40 kya)

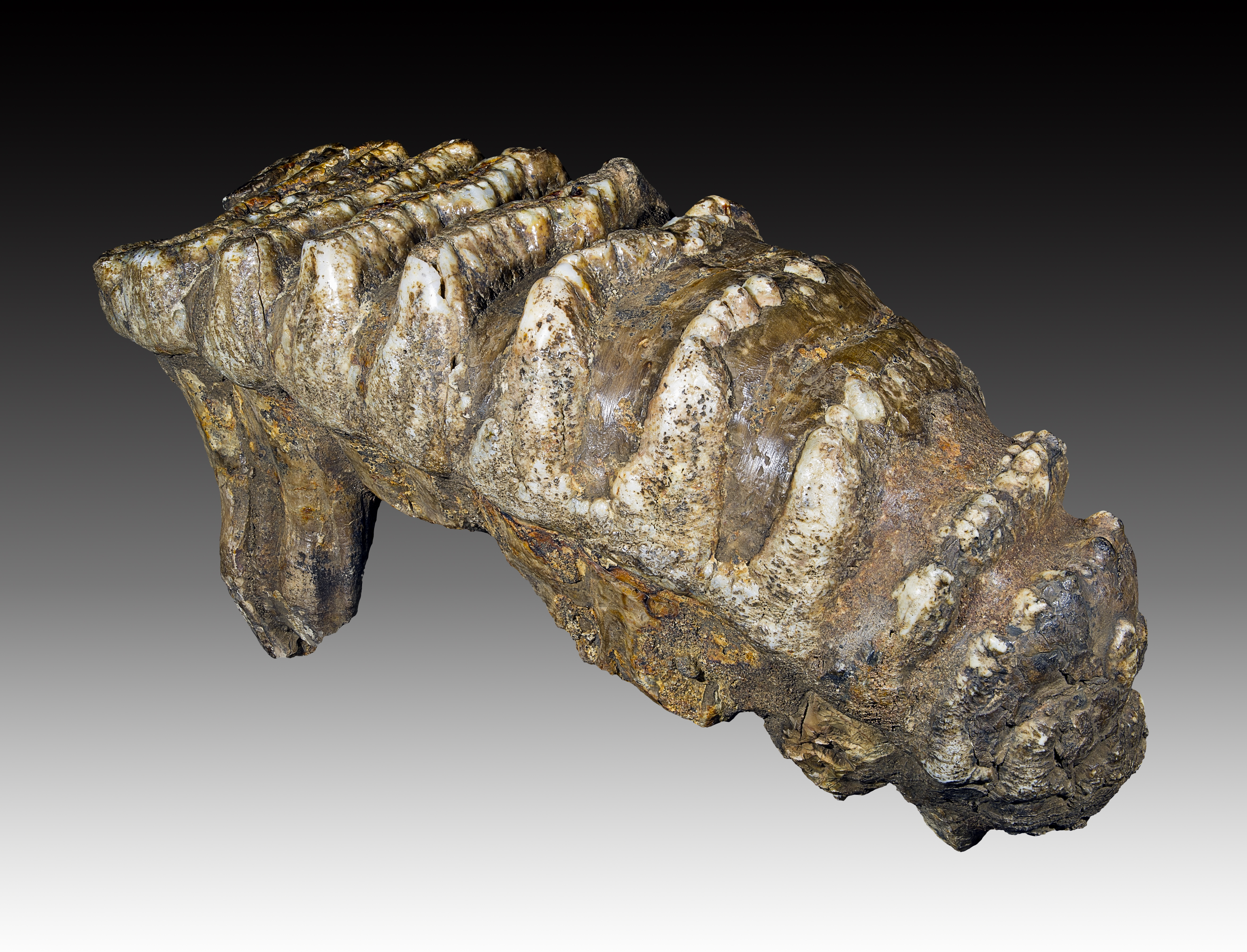
Molar of Stegodon trigonocephalus

== See also ==
- Homo floresiensis
- Liang Bua Cave site in Flores
- List of fossil sites
- List of human evolution fossils
- Meganthropus
- Mojokerto child (another Javanese Homo erectus fossil)
- Prehistoric Asia
- Prehistoric Indonesia
- Solo Man (refers to the Ngandong site in Java)
- Trinil fossil site in Java.
