= Sangiran 2 =

Hominin fossil

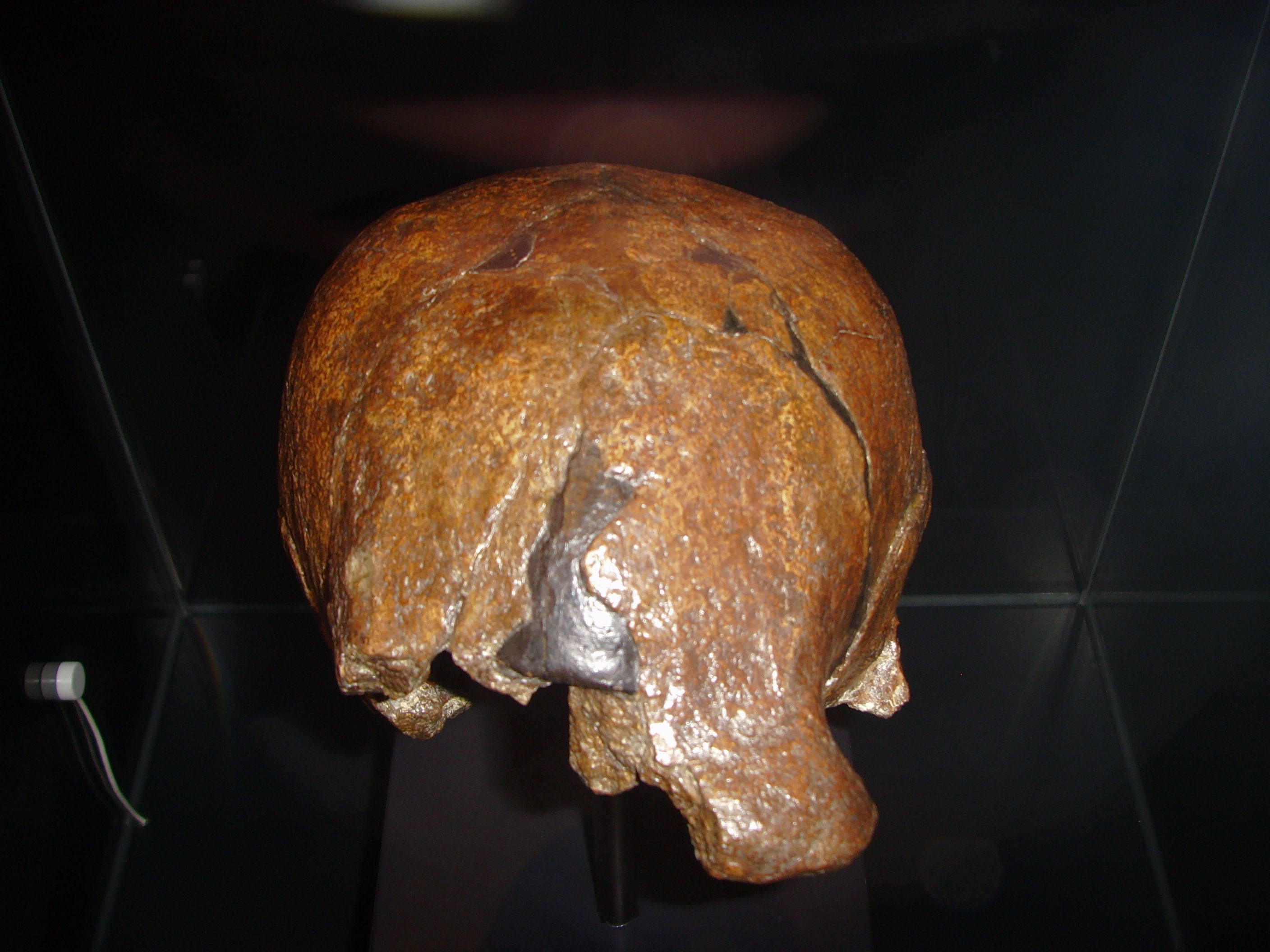
- Catalog no.: Sangiran 2
- Species: Homo erectus
- Age: 0.7 - 1.6 mya
- Place discovered: Indonesia
- Date discovered: 1937
- Discovered by: G.H.R. von Koenigswald

Sangiran 2 is a fossilized upper cranium of a Homo erectus (Homo erectus erectus). It was discovered in Sangiran, Indonesia by G.H.R. von Koenigswald in 1937.

It is estimated to be between 0.7 and 1.6 million years old.

Its characteristics include a long low plane behind the orbits and inwardly sloping sides.

== See also ==
- List of fossil sites (with link directory)
- List of hominina (hominid) fossils (with images)
