= NG 6 =

Homo erectus fossil

- The NG 6 upper cranium
- Common name: NG 6
- Species: Homo erectus
- Age: 38,500 years
- Place discovered: Indonesia
- Date discovered: c. 1932
- Discovered by: C. ter Haar and Gustav Koenigswald

NG 6 is the fossilized upper cranium of the species Homo erectus. It was discovered in Ngandong, Indonesia by C. ter Haar and GHR von Koenigswald in 1931–1933.

Its characteristics include a slightly larger braincase than other erectus samples and a fairly recent age of 50,000 - 27,000 years.

== See also ==
- List of fossil sites (with link directory)
- List of hominina (hominid) fossils (with images)
