= Wajak crania =

Hominin fossil

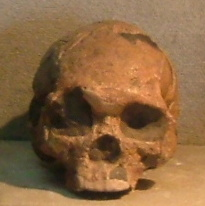
- Cast of Wajak 1
- Common name: Wajak crania
- Species: Homo sapiens
- Age: 32,500 years
- Place discovered: East Java, Indonesia
- Date discovered: 24 October 1888
- Discovered by: B.D. van Rietschoten and Eugene Dubois

The Wajak crania (also Wadjak, following the Dutch spelling of the toponym) are two fossil human skulls discovered near Wajak, a village in Tulungagung Regency, East Java, Indonesia (then Dutch East Indies) in 1888/90. The first was found on 24 October 1888 by mining engineer B.D. van Rietschoten who sent it to paleontologist Eugène Dubois who subsequently found the second skull in September 1890. When returning to the Netherlands in 1895, Dubois took the skulls with him. They are now located in Naturalis, Leyden.

Dubbed Wajak Man, and formerly classified by Dubois as a separate species (Homo wadjakensis) and Pramujiono as a subspecies of Homo erectus in a self-published paper, the skulls are now recognized as an early anatomically modern human fossil. They were dated to the early-to-mid Holocene (12,000 to 5,000 years ago) in the 1990s, but a 2013 study revised the date to between 28,000 and 37,000 years ago. Their morphological characteristics have been described as showing affinity to both proto-Australoid (intermediate between Solo Man and contemporary Australo-Melanesians) and to Mongoloid populations, specifically Chinese people, sharing specific Mongoloid traits such as flat face. Some anthropologists argue that a population related to the Wajak crania may be ancestral to both Mongoloid and Australo-Melanesian populations, with the Wajak crania representing a link between these populations. Anthropologists such as Bulbeck and Turner concluded, based on these and other findings, that "southern Mongoloids" are indigenous to Southeast Asia, with the proto-Mongoloid population to have originated in the Sunda region or Mainland Southeast Asia, while their distant relatives, the Australo-Melanesians originated in the Sahul region with at least 50,000 years of divergence. Anthropologist Paul Storm argues that "the most likely interpretation is to consider the Wajak skulls as Mesolithic robust representatives of the present inhabitants of Java", Javanese people.

== See also ==
- Peopling of Southeast Asia
- List of human evolution fossils#Holocene

== Bibliography ==
- Storm, P. (1995). "The evolutionary significance of the Wajak skulls". Scripta Geologica. 110: 1–248.
- Storm, P.; Nelson, A. J. (April 1992). "The many faces of Wadjak Man". Archaeology in Oceania. 27 (1): 37–46. doi:10.1002/j.1834-4453.1992.tb00281.x.
