= Garniss Curtis =

American geochronologist (1919–2012)

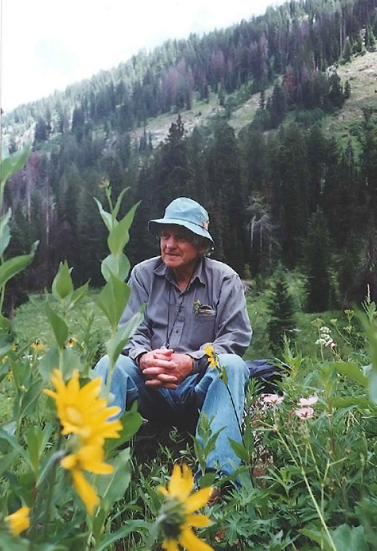
Garniss Curtis in 2001.

Garniss H. Curtis, (born May 27, 1919 – died December 19, 2012) was a professor of geology at the University of California, Berkeley, geochronologist, volcanologist, geophysicist, and founder of the Berkeley Geochronology Center. In 1960, Curtis and fellow UC Berkeley geophysicist Jack Evernden used potassium-argon dating methods developed by UC Berkeley physicist John Reynolds on minerals found in tephra deposits collected by Evernden to date Mary Leakey's 1959 Olduvai Gorge Bed I hominin Zinjanthropus (Paranthropus boisei) to 1.89 to 1.57 Mya. The great age of the fossil hominid and associated stone tools in the bed pushed back the then accepted age of the Pleistocene another million years, causing a stir in the geology community. The dating of these fossil finds is considered a starting point for the collaboration of paleoanthropology and geochronology.

Garniss Curtis died December 19, 2012, in Orinda, California.
