= Teuku Jacob =

Indonesian paleoanthropologist

- Born: 6 December 1929; Peureulak, Aceh, Dutch East Indies (now Indonesia)
- Died: 17 October 2007 (aged 77); Yogyakarta, Central Java, Indonesia
- Education: Utrecht University (Ph.D.; 1967)
- Known for: Contributions to biological anthropology
- Scientific career
- Fields: Paleoanthropology; Paleontology
- Workplaces: Gadjah Mada University

Teuku Jacob (6 December 1929 – 17 October 2007) was an Indonesian paleoanthropologist. As a student of Gustav Heinrich Ralph von Koenigswald in the 1950s, Jacob claimed to have discovered and studied numerous specimens of Homo erectus. He came to international prominence as a vocal critic of scientists who believed remains discovered in Flores belonged to a new species in the genus Homo, Homo floresiensis.

== Early life ==
Teuku Jacob was born on 6 December 1929 in Peureulak, East Aceh, to parents Soeleiman and Tjut Kariman. He was the youngest of three children.

From childhood he attended HIS Poesaka in Peureulak in 1936 and HIS Langsa in 1938, completing his primary education in 1942. He then studied at Kokumin Gakkö in Langsa during 1942–1943, followed by Sekolah Tygakkö until 1945. After the Indonesian National Revolution, he pursued secondary education at Sekolah Menengah Tinggi Kutaraja in Banda Aceh from 1946 to 1949.

== Career ==
Jacob studied at Gadjah Mada University's School of Medicine from 1950 to 1956; University of Arizona from 1957 to 1958; Howard University from 1958 to 1960, and finally Utrecht University, where he completed his doctorate in anthropology in 1967. As a young adult, Jacob actively participated in the Indonesian National Revolution, producing a nationalist radio program. After the end of the Japanese occupation of the Dutch East Indies during World War II, Jacob served in the Indonesian armed forces. From 1982 to 1987, Jacob was also a member of the People's Consultative Assembly.

Jacob died in Dr. Sardjito Hospital at the age of 77 after suffering from a debilitating liver disease.

== Homo floresiensis ==
Jacob came to international prominence when he expressed his disagreement with scientists who claimed that remains found on the island of Flores constituted a new human species, labeled Homo floresiensis. Jacob insisted that the remains were those of microcephalic modern humans. In early December 2004, Jacob removed most of the remains from Soejono's institution, Jakarta's National Research Centre of Archaeology with the permission of Raden Panji Soejono, one of the institute's directors. He kept the bones for three months.

Jacob eventually returned the remains with portions severely damaged and missing two leg bones on February 23, 2005. Reports noted the condition of the returned remains included "long, deep cuts marking the lower edge of the Hobbit's jaw on both sides, said to be caused by a knife used to cut away the rubber mould"; "the chin of a second Hobbit snapped off and glued back together. Whoever was responsible misaligned the pieces and put them at an incorrect angle"; and, "The pelvis was smashed, destroying details that reveal body shape, gait and evolutionary history". This prompted the discovery team leader Morwood to remark "It's sickening, Jacob was greedy and acted totally irresponsibly".

Jacob, however, denied any wrongdoing. He stated that such damage occurred during transport from Yogyakarta back to Jakarta despite the physical evidence to the contrary that the jawbone had been broken while making a mold of bones.

In 2005 Indonesian officials forbade access to the cave and thus no other excavations in the place were possible. The BBC expressed the opinion that the reason for the restriction was to protect Jacob from being proven wrong. Scientists were allowed to return to the cave in 2007, the same year that Jacob died from liver disease.
