= Franz Weidenreich =

German anatomist and physical anthropologist (1873-1948)

- Born: 7 June 1873; Edenkoben, Germany
- Died: July 11, 1948 (aged 75); New York, U.S.
- Education: University of Strasbourg
- Awards: Viking Fund Medal (1946)
- Scientific career
- Fields: Anatomist; Physical anthropologist
- Workplaces: University of Heidelberg

Franz Weidenreich (7 June 1873 – 11 July 1948) was a German-American anatomist and physical anthropologist. He held chairs of anatomy at Strasbourg and Heidelberg and founded the Institute for Physical Anthropology at the University of Frankfurt, before emigrating in the 1930s and working successively in Peking and New York.

He is best known for his work on human evolution, in particular the Ehringsdorf Neanderthal and the Peking Man, and for ideas that laid the groundwork for the multiregional hypothesis in palaeoanthropology.

== Life and career ==
Weidenreich was born in Edenkoben on 7 June 1873, the youngest of four children of Jewish parents. He attended the humanistic Gymnasium in Landau and studied medicine and related subjects at Munich, Kiel, Berlin and Strasbourg, taking his doctorate at the University of Strasbourg in 1899.

From 1899 to 1901 he was an assistant, and later a Privatdozent, in the anatomy department at Strasbourg under the anthropologist Gustav Schwalbe, a noted researcher of the Neanderthal. In 1901 and 1902 he spent a short period in Frankfurt am Main, working at the Institute for Experimental Therapy under Paul Ehrlich. Ehrlich had taken notice of Weidenreich through his habilitation thesis and brought him to Frankfurt. Weidenreich became an extraordinary professor at Strasbourg in 1903 and held a full professorship of anatomy there from 1904 to 1918. He chaired the Democratic Party of Alsace-Lorraine and served as a city councillor in Strasbourg during the First World War. From 1921 to 1924 he was a professor at the University of Heidelberg.

For the winter semester of 1928–29 Weidenreich received an initially unsalaried teaching appointment in physical anthropology at the University of Frankfurt. There he founded and directed, from 1929 as an honorary professor, the Institute for Physical Anthropology, housed in the premises of the Senckenberg Museum.

After the Nazi seizure of power, Weidenreich took unpaid leave for the summer semester of 1934 and accepted a visiting professorship at the University of Chicago, which he held from April to December 1934. In the spring of 1935 he emigrated, first to Peking, where he succeeded Davidson Black as professor at the Cenozoic Research Laboratory. In the same year his teaching licence at Frankfurt was withdrawn on account of his Jewish descent, and the Institute for Physical Anthropology was dissolved. Its furnishings were used in the Institute for Hereditary Biology and Racial Hygiene, newly founded in 1935 under Otmar Freiherr von Verschuer. From 1941 to 1948 Weidenreich was a member of staff at the American Museum of Natural History in New York. He died in New York on 11 July 1948.

Peter H. Wyden, American journalist and writer, was one of his nephews and U.S. senator Ron Wyden is a grandnephew.

== Work on human evolution ==
Human evolution was Weidenreich's principal field of research, and according to the Frankfurter Personenlexikon he was one of the most important and influential scientists in this area in the twentieth century. He became known for his research on the Ehringsdorf Neanderthal and the Peking Man. On the basis of his investigations he developed what is termed the "Weidenreich theory of human evolution", which held that Homo sapiens evolved from Homo erectus across the Old World independently of any single location, with migrations occurring throughout the whole period of development. On this view, genes that are adaptive everywhere, such as those for intelligence or communication, flowed from one region to another, while genes adaptive only in a particular place remained locally bound. His theory provided the foundation for the development of the multiregional hypothesis in palaeoanthropology, which stands in opposition to the Out-of-Africa hypothesis accepted by the majority of scientists today.

Weidenreich was among the scientists to claim that Piltdown Man was a "chimera", a composite between two unrelated species, long before fluoride analyses proved that Piltdown Man was a hoax. Weidenreich also renamed Gigantopithecus blacki to Giganthropus blacki, based on a theory that primitive forms of man were much larger than the more recent ones. However, as this theory is contradictory to the Cope-Depéret rule (which states that in straight evolution lines of non-flying animals the size of species increases, not the other way round), it was rejected by Professor Dr. von Koenigswald when he returned from the Japanese concentration camp after the Second World War.
