= Eugène Dubois =

Dutch paleoanthropologist (1858–1940)

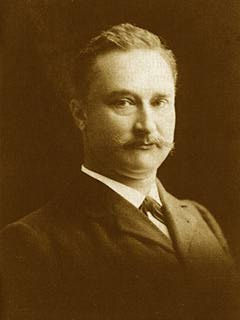
- Born: 28 January 1858; Eijsden, Netherlands
- Died: 16 December 1940 (aged 82); Haelen, Netherlands
- Education: University of Amsterdam
- Known for: Discoveries of Wajak Man and Java Man
- Scientific career
- Fields: Medicine, Paleoanthropology
- Workplaces: University of Amsterdam; Royal Dutch East Indies Army

Marie Eugène François Thomas Dubois (French: [øʒɛn dybwɑ]; 28 January 1858 – 16 December 1940) was a Dutch paleoanthropologist and geologist. He earned worldwide fame for his discovery of Pithecanthropus erectus (later redesignated Homo erectus), or "Java Man". Dubois was the first anthropologist to embark upon a purposeful search for hominid fossils.

== Early life and career ==
Dubois was born and raised in the village of Eijsden, Limburg, where his father, Jean Joseph Balthazar Dubois, an immigrant from Thimister-Clermont, Liège, Belgium, was an apothecary, later the mayor. He completed elementary education at EIjsden primary scholl. He loved exploring the "caves" ("grotten", actually underground limestone mines) of Mount Saint Peter and amassed collections of plant parts, stones, insects, shells, and animal skulls. From age 12-13 on, he attended the State High School (Rijks Hogere Burgerschool) in the Limburg city of Roermond, boarding with a family there and then he dropped out. In Roermond he attended lectures on Charles Darwin's new theory of evolution given by the German biologist, Carl Vogt.

Resisting his father's plan for him to train to follow in his footsteps, Dubois, encouraged by his teachers, decided in 1877 to study medicine at the University of Amsterdam. While a student, he taught anatomy at both of the brand new (founded 1880) art schools housed at the Rijksmuseum Amsterdam (Amsterdam State Museum) the Rijksschool voor Kunstnijverheid (State School for Applied Arts) and the Rijksnormaalschool voor Teekenonderwijzers (State Normal School for Drawing Instructors). In 1884 he completed his medical degree.

Dubois declined an offer from the University of Utrecht of a position as a docent. Instead, at the invitation of his anatomy instructor, Max Fürbringer, he decided to train as an academic. From 1881 to 1887 he studied comparative anatomy and became Fürbringer's assistant. In 1885 he investigated the larynx of vertebrates, which led him to develop a hypothesis of the evolution of this organ. Nevertheless, his chief interest was in human evolution, influenced by Ernst Haeckel, a German zoologist who reasoned that there must be intermediate species between ape and human. In 1886, he was formally appointed reader in anatomy at the University of Amsterdam. The same year he married Anna Geertruida Lojenga (1962–1943).

In 1887, to the dismay of his academic colleagues, Dubois joined the Royal Dutch East Indies Army as a Medical Officer Second Class and arranged to be posted in Indonesia. His colleagues had adviced him not to indulge too much in "that crazy book of Darwin's." With his wife and newborn daughter he moved to the colony to search for the missing link in human evolution.

== Hominid discoveries ==
=== Background ===
Charles Darwin, who introduced the scientific concept of evolution and the theory of natural selection, had explained in his 1872 book The Descent of Man that human ancestors must have lived in the tropical regions, particularly in Africa. Another British naturalist Alfred Russel Wallace, co-discoverer of the theory of natural selection who was an expert in the zoology of Southeast Asia, also indicated that the caves and limestone deposits in Africa and Southeast Asia were likely where ancestral human fossils would be present.

Following the establishment of a scientific theory on evolution, Haeckel was the one who put humans at the centre of the evolution. In his 1866 book Generelle Morphologie he gave a vivid explanation and evolutionary tree of humans alongside apes. In 1868, he created a series of scenarios for human origin and hypothesised that Asia is the likely place for the first humans. He created an imaginary ancestral human as Pithecanthropus alalus, an ape-man that cannot speak. Reasoning from these theories, he was convinced that the origins of the human species must be in the tropics, and fossil specimens such ancient humans must be found in the Dutch East Indies (the Dutch colony that is now independent Indonesia). He was unalterably convinced there was only one missing link. By 1889, Wallace in his book Darwinism changed his mind that Southeast Asia must be the birth place of humans.

Dubois contributed an article on whale anatomy to a book by the Dutch zoologist, Max Weber, and, inspired by the fresh discovery of new Neanderthal fossils at the Belgian town of Spy, he spent his vacation fossil hunting in the vicinity of his birthplace. In the Henkeput near the village of Rijckholt, where a prehistoric flint mine had just been discovered in 1881, he found some prehistoric human skulls. As his work progressed, he began to suspect that Fürbringer used his original ideas and introduced them as his own, which prompted him to leave Amsterdam. He explained his motives of joining the Dutch East Indies Army to his English friend Sir Arthur Keith:

It was not a spirit of adventure but of scientific reasoning that pithecoid human forms should be expected in pleistocene or pliocene deposits of the Malayan Archipelago, that induced me to undertake palaeontological researches in that archipelago... I did not promise my fellow students, in all seriousness, to bring home the 'missing link', but I did tell Prof. Max Fürbinger and Max Weber, my motives why I preferred to give up a certain and beautiful anatomical career for an uncertain one as a field paleontologist, the only way giving access to the latter being that of engaging as a military surgeon in the Neth.-Indian army.

==== Wajak Man ====
Replica of Wajak crania

In December 1887, Dubois arrived in Padang (now the capital of West Sumatra). In May 1888, he started to explore the Padang highlands and by August, he established that the caves contained many fossils of mammals, and thus, a potential site for ancetral human remains. In September 1888, the first find was made by mining engineer B.D. van Rietschoten on the island of Java, a quite complete skull of human. Van Rietschoten immediately sent the fossil to Dubois, who recognised it as that of an ancient human. Failing to find any human fossils in Sumatra, he then moved to Java where he quickly found, in September 1888, another skull that probably was related to Van Rietschoten's specimen. After analysis, Dubois concluded that the specimens are of a separate humen species and gave the name, Homo wadjakensis. Popularsied as the "Wajak Man", the humans are later considered as early anatomically modern human, the ancestors of modern Javanese people.

Dubois did not believe that the Wajak humans could be the ancestral missing links and kept on searching other caves. In November 1890, he found a piece of jaw bone with some teeth attached while excavating a cave in Kendeng Hills on western Java. He knew that the fossil was much more primitive that the Wajak humans, as he noted: "a human fossil [consists of] the right side of the chin of a lower jaw with the sockets of the canine tooth and of the first and second premolar.... [T]his fossil forms a different and probably lower type than any previously known." Without other specimens or body parts, he was not able to make a clear description.

==== Java Man ====
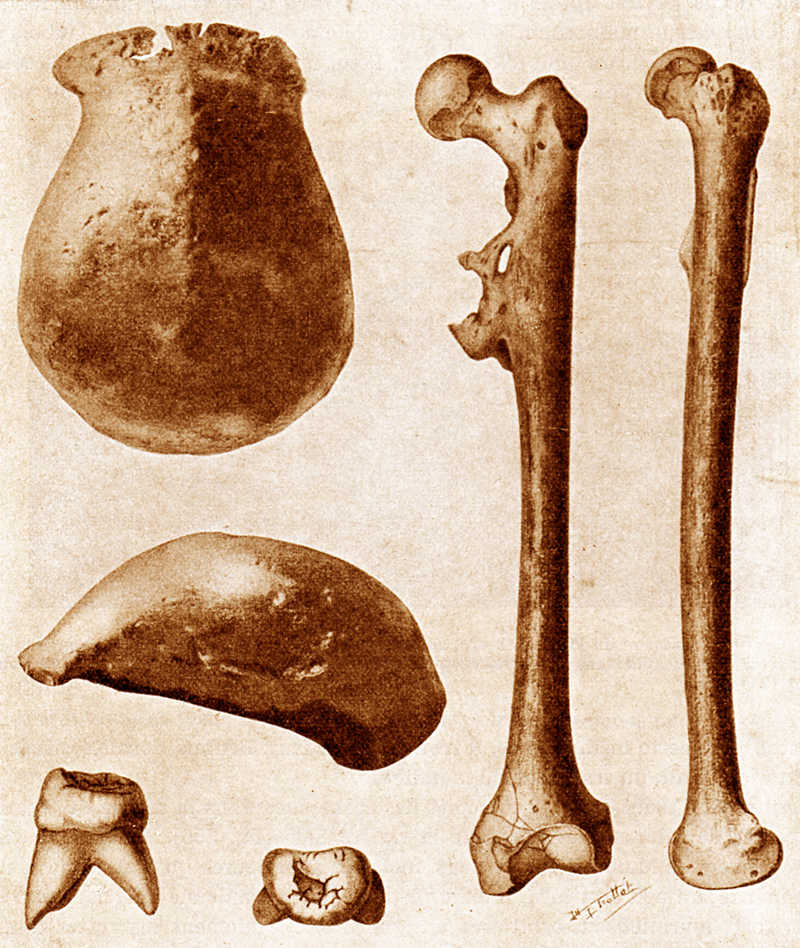
Fossils of Java Man as discovered by Dubois

In 1891, Dubois made a second exploration in Java. On his excavation of the river banks of the Solo River, at a site called Trinil, East Java, he found an abundant pile-up of different vertebrate fossils. In September 1891, he found a single tooth, a third premolar, which he recognised as belonging to a primitive primate, very similar to those of chimpanzees. The next month, he recovered a skull cap, which he believed to part of his previously found tooth. After analysis, he found that the fossil could not be related to gorillas and orangutans, thus, assigned the species as a chimpanzee (at the time scientifically named Anthropopithecus, literally "man-ape", but now Pan). He knew that it was a unique species because the brain case was unlike the chimpanzees but more resembled humans.

In August 1892, Dubois discovered an almost complete thigh bone, a left femur, from the same soil layer but 15 metre away form his collection site the previous year. He described the fossil: "From the circumstances of the find and comparative research it is evident that the three skeletal remains of elements [tooth, skull and femur] belong to one and the same individual, probably a very aged female." The thigh bone was straight like humans so that Dubois pictured it as an upright-walking chimpanzee, and gave the scientific name Anthropopithecus erectus. In his initial description he explained the evolutionary importance of the species:

In view of all three skeletal elements, especially the femur, Anthropopithecus erectus Eug. Dubois approaches modern Man more closely than any of the three great apes, a fact which is in harmony with the thesis of Lamarck, and later of Darwin and others, that the first step in the direction of humanisation of our ancestors was the [acquisition of the] erect position.

Further analysis convinced Dubois that the fossils represented not a chimpanzee but a primitive human, which he identified as "a species in between humans and apes". In 1894, he renamed the species as Pithecanthropus erectus ("an ape-human that stands upright"), retaining Haeckel's hypothetical species, in a monograph titled Pithecanthropus erectus: eine menschenähnliche Übergangsform aus Java ("Pithecanthropus erectus: a human-like transitional form from Java"). Given a common name, Java Man, the discovery became hugely influential in human biology and evolution. Today, they are classified as Homo erectus ("human that stands upright"). These were the first specimens of early hominid remains to be found outside of Africa or Europe.

== Later years ==
In 1895, Dubois and his family returned to the Netherlands, and initially lived in The Hague, later settling in Haarlem. In 1897, the University of Amsterdam awarded him an honorary doctorate in botany and zoology. In 1899, he was appointed a professor in geology, crystallography, mineralogy and palaeontology a function that did not keep him from his research in anatomy. He was promoted to full professor in 1907 with an additional teaching course on physical geography. From 1897 until 1928, he also designated keeper (curator) of paleontology, geology and mineralogy at Teylers Museum, where he also kept the H. erectus remains. In 1919, he became elected member of the Royal Netherlands Academy of Arts and Sciences. He officially retired from the university in 1928, but due to lack of eligible successor, he was relieved from his duties only in 1929.

In 1937, Dubois moved to Haelen, where he created a natural park and spent the rest of his life. He died on 16 December 1960, and was buried in unconsecrated ground on 16 December 1940 in Venlo, "Algemene Begraafplaats", grave number NH2\26\-\BR.

== Legacy ==
Until 2025, Dubois' paleontological collection and scientific archive remained at Naturalis in Leiden. The institute dedicated an exhibition to his findings of Homo erectus in their renovated museum, where the holotype Trinil 2 was on display. On 26 September 2025, The government of the Netherlands announced that they would repatriate the 28,000 fossils which made up the Dubois collection back to Indonesia, including the Java Man.

According to Pat Shipman, adjunct professor of anthropology at Pennsylvania State University, Dubois was "an extremely influential person in founding paleo-anthropology. He not only found the fossils. He analyzed them in wholly new ways. He pulled human fossils out of this context of racial identification and shoved it into an evolutionary context and that was a real revolution." A special section of Museum Het Ursulinenconvent - International Museum for Family History is devoted to Dubois' life and work. Asteroid 206241 Dubois, discovered by the NEAT program in 2002, was named in his memory. The official naming citation was published by the Minor Planet Center on 7 June 2009 (M.P.C. 66245).

== See also ==
- List of fossil sites (with link directory)
- List of hominina (hominid) fossils (with images)
- International Museum for Family History
