= Gustav Heinrich Ralph von Koenigswald =

German-Dutch paleontologist and geologist (1902–1982)

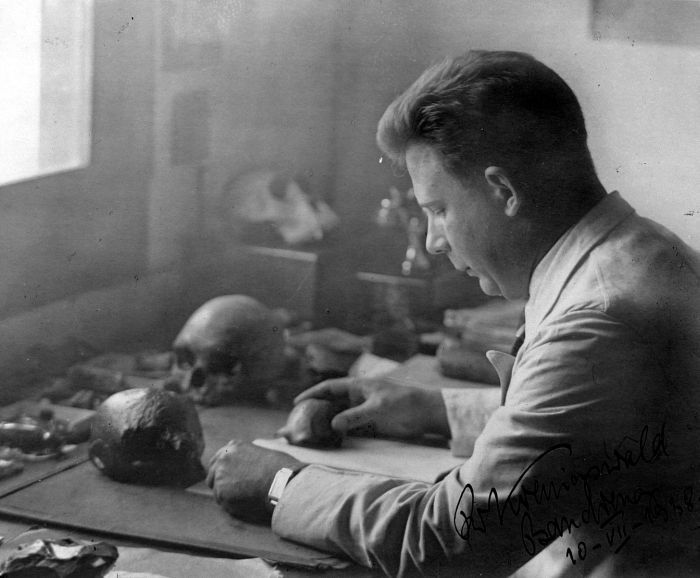
- Gustav Heinrich Ralph von Koenigswald.
- Born: 13 November 1902; Berlin, German Empire
- Died: 10 July 1982 (aged 79); Bad Homburg, West Germany
- Occupations: geologist; paleontologist

Gustav Heinrich Ralph (often cited as G. H. R.) von Koenigswald (13 November 1902 – 10 July 1982) was a German-Dutch paleontologist and geologist who conducted research on hominins, including Homo erectus. His discoveries and studies of hominid fossils in Java and his studies of other important fossils of south-eastern Asia firmly established his reputation as one of the leading figures of 20th-century paleo-anthropology.

== Biography ==
Von Koenigswald was born in Berlin in a period of intense interest and rapid growth in the study of evolution. He began his fossil vertebrate collection when he was fifteen with the acquisition of a rhinoceros molar during an excursion to Mauer, Germany. He subsequently studied geology and paleontology at Berlin, Tübingen, Cologne and Munich.

=== Java ===
Von Koenigswald's teacher Ferdinand Broili had good contacts with the Dutch geologists Karl Martin and Reinout Willem van Bemmelen. Through these contacts Von Koenigswald could join the Geological Survey of Java as paleontologist in late 1930. Financed in part through the Carnegie Foundation, he began a systematic survey of the country. Von Koenigswald made his most significant finds in this area of Asia between January 1931 and 1941. At age 33, he announced the discovery of a juvenile calvarium from Mojokerto and assigned it to Pithecanthropus erectus. This identification was criticized by the respected paleontologist Eugène Dubois, but Von Koenigswald did not change his identification. Between 1937 and 1941, a number of important hominid specimens emerged from Java. One of Von Koenigswald's assistants brought him a piece of a Pithecanthropus skull in 1937. Unfortunately, an offer to pay for additional fossils by the piece led to specimens being broken into splinters by native helpers. And when he stopped payments as a result, many locals burned the remaining skulls they had in retaliation. One skull cap, the first Sangiran calvarium, was an exact duplicate of Dubois' Pithecanthropus calvarium. Other well-known fossils include the Sangiran B mandible, Sangiran 4 including the well-known maxilla with the diastema, and the 1939 and 1941 jaws assigned by Von Koenigswald to Meganthropus paleojavanicus.

His work on the fossils of Central Java, particularly from Sangiran, led him to claim that the mammalian remains of the area could be assigned to all three levels of the Pleistocene. All Javanese hominid fossils recovered emerged from three major sets of beds:

- Pucangan formation, Jetis beds dated to the Early Pleistocene,
- the Kabuh formation, Trinil beds dated to the Middle Pleistocene, and
- the Ngandong beds dated to the Upper Pleistocene.

Von Koenigswald pointed out that these and other fossil discoveries since 1917 contradicted the 19th-century idea that humans had an ancestor with a modern brain and ape jaw, and actually suggested the opposite relationship. The Java fossils are currently housed in the Senckenberg Museum with the financial support of the Werner Reimers Foundation of Bad Homburg.

In 1937, Von Koenigswald hosted paleontologist Franz Weidenreich's visit to Java to examine recent discovery sites. Also in 1937, Von Koenigswald became a Dutch citizen. In 1938 Von Koenigswald and Weidenreich together announced the discovery of a new skull of Pithecanthropus (P. robustus). Early in 1939, Von Koenigswald took several Javanese hominin specimens to Weidenreich in Peking, China. Comparing the Sangiran and Choukoutien hominids led the two scientists to conclude that the specimens were closely allied. They decided to abandon the genus Sinanthropus, combining all the specimens into the earlier-named genus Pithecanthropus. Later, Pithecanthropus was incorporated into the genus Homo as Homo erectus.

=== World War II ===
World War II brought difficulty and danger to Von Koenigswald in Java. He managed to hide his fossils from the invading Japanese, and although he, being a Dutch citizen, was interned in a prisoner-of-war camp, only one fossil skull was confiscated by the Japanese soldiers. It was presented to Emperor Hirohito but was recovered after the war by Walter Fairservis.

During the war years, Weidenreich's description of Sinanthropus was published. In a borrowed office at the American Museum of Natural History, Weidenreich added to their earlier work and reviewed the fossil record of human evolution, merging Sinanthropus and Pithecanthropus into a new taxon, Homo erectus, with various geographic sub-species. He published descriptions and assigned scientific names to some of Von Koenigswald's discoveries, as he and others presumed that Von Koenigswald was dead at the hands of the Japanese. After the war, Von Koenigswald worked with Weidenreich at the American Museum of Natural History in New York City for 18 months.

=== Netherlands ===
For the next 20 years, Von Koenigswald filled a Chair of Palaeontology created for him at the Rijksuniversiteit at Utrecht, Netherlands. During his academic career, he visited sites in North and South Africa (1951–52), the Philippines, Thailand and Borneo (1957), and Pakistan (1966–67). In Pakistan, Von Koenigswald and his students found specimens which included a palate assigned to a new species of the hominoid genus Sivapithecus and teeth considered to belong to Ramapithecus.

In 1950 he became member, and in 1968 foreign member of the Royal Netherlands Academy of Arts and Sciences.

Von Koenigswald studied the relationships between African, Asian and European hominoid fossils attributed to Ramapithecus or its close allies such as Graecopithecus of Greece and Kenyapithecus of Fort Ternan, Kenya. It was his opinion that the Indian form was a hominid and the African form a pongid. This later led him to strongly press the claim of India as the original home of the Hominidae.

After retiring from the Chair at Utrecht, the Werner-Reimers Foundation provided him with facilities at the Senckenberg Nature Research Society and Natural History Museum in Frankfurt, Germany. He, with the support of J. L. Franzen, directed this paleontological research center for the remaining 14 years of his life. Von Koenigswald died at his home in Bad Homburg near Frankfurt-am-Main in West Germany on July 10, 1982.

== Works ==
- Evolution of Man University of Michigan Press, Ann Arbor Paperback Series, Revised edition, 1976. ISBN 0-472-05020-6.
- Meeting Prehistoric Man Lowe & Brydone (printers) LTD, London, Scientific Book Club Edition, 1956.

== See also ==
- List of fossil sites (with link directory)
- List of hominina (hominid) fossils (with images)

== Sources ==
- Tattersall, Ian and Schwartz, Jeffrey. "Extinct Humans". Westview Press, Boulder, Colorado and Cumnor Hill, Oxford, 2000. ISBN 0-8133-3482-9 (hc)
