= Kabuh Formation =

Geologic formation from Central Java

- Stratigraphic range: Zanclean–Chibanian; ~5.333–0.126 Ma
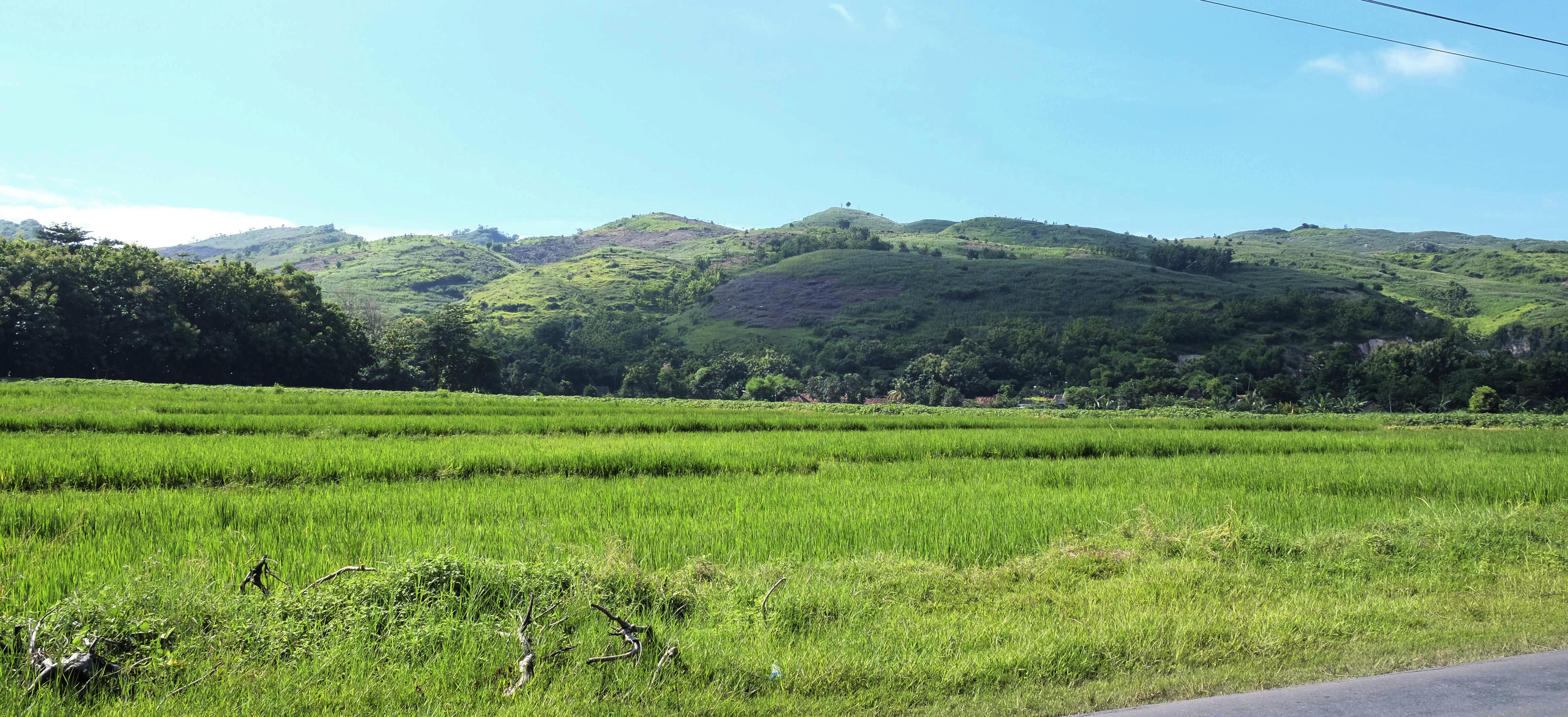
- Type: Geological formation
- Unit of: Kendeng Group

Lithology
- Primary: Sandstone, mudstone

Location
- Coordinates: 7.5°S 110.0°E
- Approximate paleocoordinates: 7.6°S 110.4°E
- Region: Java
- Country: Indonesia

The Kabuh Formation is a Plio-Pleistocene geologic formation from Central Java, consisting of several unnamed members belonging to the Kendeng Group. Many of the fossils discovered from Sambungmacan belonging to this group were discovered in an accumulated sediment deposit in a flood-controlling canal near the Solo River, including a series of hominin crania that are similar in anatomy and geologically younger than the Ngandong hominins upstream. This area was excavated throughout the 1970s.

== Fauna ==
=== Gastropoda ===
Genus	Species	Group	Material	Notes
Calyptraea (Bicatillus)	morbidum	Kendeng		
Cerithium	bioekense	Kendeng		
Cerithidea (Cerithideopsilla)	cf. microptera	Kendeng		
Cerithidea (Cerithideopsilla)	cheribonensis	Kendeng		
Cerithidea (Cerithideopsilla)	jenkinsi	Kendeng		

=== Reptilia ===
Genus	Species	Location	Material	Notes
Orlitia	borneensis	Sambungmacan	Right first costal, isolate	Geoemydid turtle

=== Mammalia ===
Genus	Species	Location	Material	Notes	Images
Homo	erectus	Sambungmacan	A tibial shaft and three crania	Late-stage Indonesian hominins	
Homo	erectus newyorkensis	Sambungmacan	A tibial shaft and three crania	Not accepted	
Bovidae	indet.	Sambungmacan	A tooth	Discovered circa 1973 excavations	
