= Archaic humans in Southeast Asia =

Possible site of archaic human remains

A map of Southeast Asia

The region of Southeast Asia is considered a possible place for the evidence of archaic human remains that could be found due to the pathway between Australia and mainland Southeast Asia, where the migration of multiple early humans has occurred out of Africa. One of many pieces of evidence is of the early human found in central Java of Indonesia in the late 19th century by Eugene Dubois, and later in 1937 at Sangiran site by G.H.R. van Koenigswald. These skull and fossil materials are Homo erectus, named Pithecanthropus erectus by Dubois and Meganthropus palaeojavanicus by van Koenigswald. They were dated to c. 1.88 and 1.66 Ma, as suggested by Swisher et al. by analysis of volcanic rocks.

== Archaeological discoveries in Southeast Asia ==
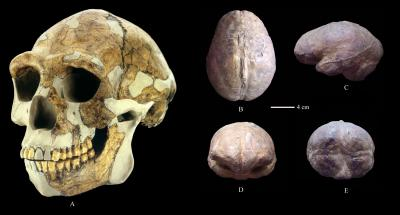
The reconstructed Zhoukoudian skull

It was not until the late 1800s that Dubois found the skull of Homo erectus in Java, Indonesia, and had plugged the Southeast Asian region into the spotlight.

In 2003 since the archaeologists found another archaic human species on the island of Flores, Indonesia, this discovery has introduced many new theoretical approaches to human evolution in the region and on the global scales.

Southeast Asia is separated into two main subregions following the previous Oriental biogeographical region; mainland Southeast Asia and island Southeast Asia. The region of mainland and island Southeast Asia has been separated into four sub-regions: The Indochinese, Sundaic, Indian, and Wallacean provinces. The Indochinese province includes northern Thailand, southern China, Myanmar, Laos, and Cambodia. The Sundaic province includes southern Thailand, Malaysia, Sumatra, Java, and Borneo. These two regions are divided by the climatic, zoological, and environmental patterns in which it implicates a different set of mammals and plants. This region is of some importance in paleoanthropology, e.g. Homo erectus in Java, Homo floresiensis in Flores, and until the early anatomically modern human in Laos. Furthermore, the faunal remains that were found within the region indicate the possible exchange between the Indochinese and Sundaic faunal in which the assemblages from this intermediate zone might yield the hominid specimen.

== Homo erectus in Southeast Asia ==
Since the discovery of archaic human fossils by Dubois and van Koenigswald during the late 1800s and early 1900s which identified as Homo erectus, there is a small number of later evidence of Homo erectus that found as old as those fossils. Nevertheless, in local scale, one human fossil was found in the region of northern Thailand in 1999 by one villager in which some archaeologists suggest that it might be a fragmental piece of the skull of Homo erectus (c. 500 Ka) the four pieces of the fragmented skull are believed to be the right "frontal region of a calvaria with a very thick tabula externa, a thick dipole and very thin tabula interna" (Marwick 2009:54). However, this evidence is still debated by scholars and no research has been conducted regarding the age of the piece and the fauna that comes with it.

=== In Java ===
At Trinil, Dubois found the skull (cranial part), tooth and thighbone of one individual (Java Man) and naming him as Pithecanthropus erectus. While at Sangiran, van Koenigswald discovered at least 40 fossils and named them as Meganthropus palaeojavanicus. Although the fossils that were found in Trinil and Sangiran sites are the oldest evidence found within the region, the date of these fossils—implicated by Dubois—is still ambiguous. Swisher et al. are the first scholars who attempted to analyze the age of these fossils by using the ^{40}Ar/^{39}Ar dating of volcanic rock from both sites. Swisher et al. suggest that the result from both sites indicates the age of the fossils is dated back to c. 1.81-1.82 Ma or Early Pleistocene. This date was older than the fossils of the Homo erectus that were found from Olduvai Gorge at Tanzania at least 0.6 Ma. Nevertheless, some scholars argue that the dating method at both Java sites is unclear, especially the collective method of the rock and the relationships between the rock and the fossils. In fact, the remains in Java were found in more than these two sites, such as Ngandong (Homo soloensis) and Kedung.

Along with these fossils, there are also tools and fauna as well as other related artifacts found within the sites and other sites nearby. These artifacts could nevertheless shed light on the unresolved age of these remains. By using the absolute (radiometric) dating method, these faunal remains implicate the age at 0.8 Ma as for Flores Island. As for Kedung site, the faunal remains indicate the 110 and 70 ka in which this record is quite well known for the turnover of the age of H. erectus. In addition, the faunal remains that Dubois and van Koenigswald used might be overlying on the deposits of Kubuh and Pucangan Formations in which it indicates slightly younger ages from the remains of both sites. Therefore, scholars still debate the age of the H. erectus fossil Java Man. Corvinus et al. suggested that the evidence found between Southeast Asia and India illustrate a different set of understanding. For instance, in Southeast Asia, the finding of the human remains is flourishing and well-studied, but the lack of stone tools and human occupation. While in Indian sites there were discoveries of a number of Acheulean stone tools, Southeast Asian sites lack those remains. For this reason, to established and reconstructed the early H. erectus's activity and environment are yet ambiguity in the region regarding the technology and development of the tools and the relation to fossils.

The tools that were found within the Java sites are quite different from the Acheulean type that are found in Africa and Europe in which this type of stone tools implicates the H. erectus or Homo ergaster culture. Thus, the tools that are found in Java might suggest a different set of the culture of H. erectus between African and Asian regions. Swisher et al. (1994) also suggest that these tools developed separately from the Acheulean types and might indicate that H. erectus might migrate out of Africa even before the Acheulean type of tools were developed. However, the stone tools found in the Java region are difficult for establishing the age that can link to the H. erectus fossils. The research and analyses (tools, deposits, and faunal analyses) above thus suggests that the Javanese fossils are to be placed in the Middle Pleistocene or approximately 1.66 – 0.7 Ma.

=== Persistence hunting ===
The technique of persistence hunting has been suggested as an important hunting tactic of Homo erectus. Since most animals were faster than Homo erectus, they would have had to use other skillsets that countered the speed of these animals. One such option is to ambush or surround or entrap animals, or to herd them into traps or over cliffs. Another is to use the superior persistence and stamina of humans to exhaust prey in some extended chase, until their prey was immobilised by exhaustion, where it could then be easily killed with hunting weapons.

However, long chases would have led to dehydration because of constant movement in hot weather causing persistence hunters to lose a maximum of 10% of their body mass in water weight. Studies by scientists show that Homo erectus could persistence hunt for a maximum of 5 hours before they would become too dehydrated.

== Homo floresiensis ==
In 2003 another human species was found at Liang Bua cave in Flores, eastern Indonesia. The fossils consist of cranial and some post-cranial remains of one individual, and a premolar from another individual in older deposits. The species was recognized as distinct from H. erectus and H sapiens on the basis of anatomical differences (including much smaller body size), and named Homo floresiensis. It has been suggested that the brain volume of these individuals was approximately around 400 cm^{3}, similar to the African Australopithecus afarensis. However, H. floresiensis remains were dated to only 38 ka – 18 ka ago (Late Pleistocene to Early Holocene), using radiocarbon, luminescence, uranium-series and electron spin resonance (ESR) methods on sediments and associated artifacts.

=== Hunting technique ===
Apart from the remains, archaeologists also found stone (bifacial small core) or fleck tools in the same section of the individuals at least 32 of them and other 5,500 flakes per cubic meter on another section nearby. In addition, there is also a formal component found only with evidence of juvenile Stegodon and Komodo dragon, including points, perforators, blades and microblade that were probably hafted as barbs in which these tools indicate a selective hunting method. Although these stone artifacts seem to suggest the possibilities that these individuals use them, archaeologists are unable to establish which human species manufactured them since similar flakes tools and the remains of juvenile Stegodon and Komodo dragon are also found at the Soa Basin sites nearby as well. Despite this fact, the cognitive ability of H. floresiensis should not be underestimated. In addition, all evidence suggests another possibility of this species that they were able to migrate across the Wallace line into the Wallacean province in which according to geographical setting it was difficult to do. Nevertheless, scholars seem to agree that this H. floresiensis represent a species different from H. erectus and H. sapiens and overlapping with the presence of both in the region, raising the possibility that these species might have lived alongside each other before modern humans fully colonized the region later on.

== Early modern human migration to Southeast Asia ==
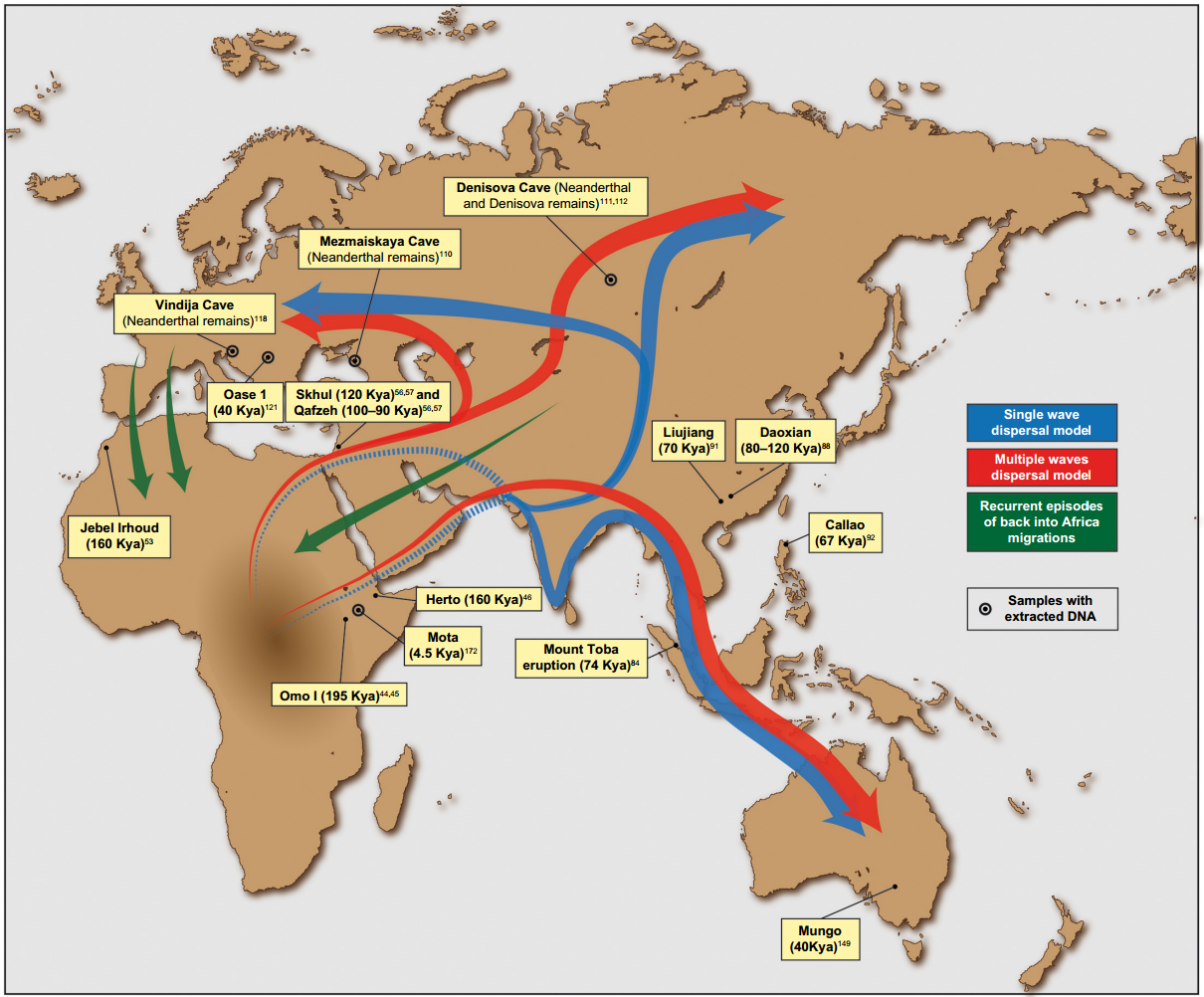
Migration route thought to be used by modern humans coming out of Africa and into Southeast Asia.

There are many different theories of how Southeast Asians of today came to be. However, the two most prominent and widely accepted theories by scientists are the "Out of Africa" Model and the theory that they are direct descendants of the first Homo erectus species.

Regarding the "Out of Africa" theory, archaic humans must have had to migrate through modern day Egypt into the Middle East and from there travel through Central Asia into China to get to Southeast Asia. This migration of archaic humans must have had to take place around 50,000-70,000 years ago. Some evidence of archaic humans settling and migrating throughout Asia from Africa can be proven with the skulls found in the Upper Cave in Zhoukoudian, China. Since the Zhoukoudian skull is a Homo erectus (Homo ergaster), scientists generally agree that it had ultimately originated from Africa, since Homo erectus originated from there.

Furthermore, many scientists believe modern Southeast Asian humans descend from Homo erectus which migrated out of Africa around 1.8 million years ago which is supported by the Dali Man found by Liu Shuntang in 1978 in Dali County, Shaanxi Province, China. Although the dating of the fossil yields unclear answers as to the age of the fossil, scientists estimate it to be around 20,000-260,000 years old from uranium-series dating.

=== Possible migration routes through Southeast Asia ===
Most scholars who work in Southeast Asia attempt to establish the possible route through which early humans would migrate passing through the region after they migrated out of Africa. The evidence also indicates the migration route and settlement location along the routes that might have taken place during the Late Pleistocene and Early Holocene. There are three possible routes suggested by scholars;

1. From the northwest of Thailand they went down to Chao Phraya river basin and the Gulf of Thailand in which this route is supported by the faunal remains found in north Asia and Indonesia. Topographically advantages like the mountainous western flank of the Chao Phraya Basin, are likely to benefit the hominin habitats. Those advantages are "environmental mosaics with varied food resources and abundant water supplies, combined with physical features offering protection from the weather and providing tactical advantages in the pursuit of prey"
2. From Northeastern Vietnam they went down to the Indochinese region. This route is supported by 86 anatomically modern human fossils found in mainland and island East and Southeast Asia. Although this model excluded the recent findings of the H. sapiens tooth found in Thailand and Vietnam and the remains in Laos, this new evidence seems to support this route.
3. From the coast of South Asia and the west part of mainland Southeast Asia, they went down to the Gulf of Thailand, in which this route is supported by the coastline that many scholars believe that this route is a possible route for the migration from Africa. This route seems to depict the major movement from Africa into this region. However, many possible sites along the coastline are difficult to locate due to the shift of the shoreline, even though the environmental setting is suitable for human habitation.

== First modern humans in Australia ==
It is a well-known fact that there have been aboriginal people residing in the Australian bush for thousands of years. Where they came from and when they came to the island continent, however, is less known. In 1968, Australian geologist Jim Bowler went to the dry lake-bed of Lake Mungo and discovered the remains of Mungo Lady. After studies were done on the remains of Mungo Lady, scientists have come to the conclusion that Mungo Lady is around 40,000-42,000 years old and is one of the oldest anatomically modern human fossils in the world. A reason for Mungo Lady's importance to the field of anthropology is because she is one of the oldest examples of cremation by humans in the world, thus signifying the inception of the earliest forms of human tradition and cultural beliefs.

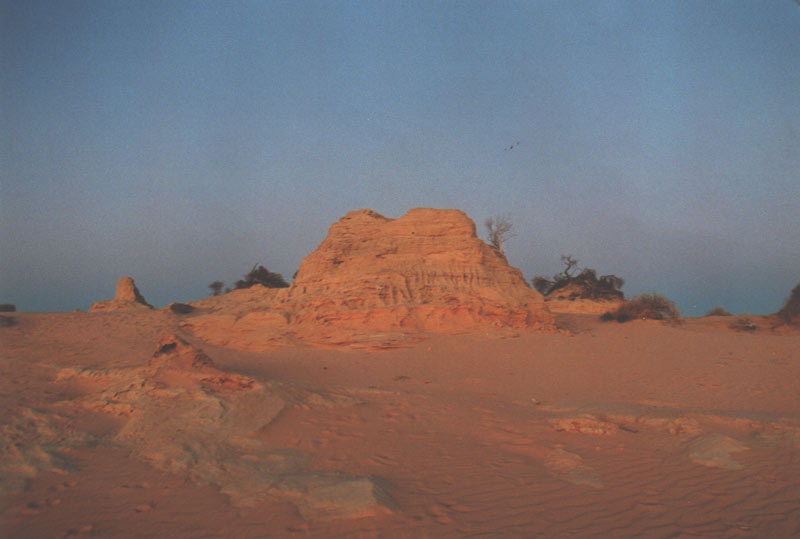
Dry lakebed of Lake Mungo

For Mungo Lady's ancestors to get to the continent of Australia however, would have been very difficult. Around 50,000-70,000 years ago, in line with the "Out of Africa" theory, archaic humans must have had to migrate through the Northern Indonesian Islands, into New Guinea and then into Australia. Although this may not be possible with current day geography and sea levels, 50,000-70,000 years ago, the Earth was different. Sea levels at this time were around 25-50 meters lower than modern day sea levels exposing more land and making it possible for a migration.

== See also ==
- Peopling of Southeast Asia
- Prehistoric Asia
- Prehistoric Southeast Asia
- Recent African origin of modern humans
- Homo luzonensis – Archaic human from Luzon, Philippines
- Denisovan – Archaic human species from Asia
