= Sambungmacan crania =

Series of hominin fossils discovered in Indonesia

Sambungmacan
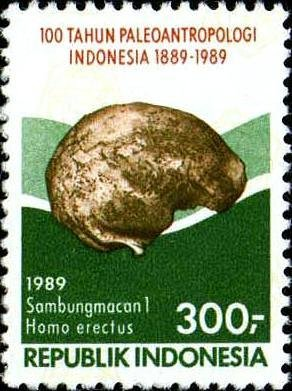
- Stamp featuring Sm 1.
- Catalog no.: Sm 1-4
- Common name: Sambungmacan
- Species: Homo erectus
- Age: 70-40 ka
- Place discovered: Solo River
- Date discovered: 1973-2001
- Discovered by: Construction crews, fossil collectors

The hominin remains discovered at Sambungmacan are a series of four archaic human fossils assigned to Homo erectus and discovered in Java. The first is the calvarium is Sm 1, the second is a tibial fragment Sm 2, and the third and fourth are calvaria Sm 3 and Sm 4. Laitman and Tattersall (2001) suggested naming Sm 3, the second calvarium in the series, Homo erectus newyorkensis, but later sources do not agree with this taxonomic scheme.

== History ==
Sm 1 was discovered by local workers in 1973 during the construction of a canal to control flooding from the nearby Solo River. Sm 2 was discovered on the 21st of September, 1977 at a shortcut canal site alongside other faunal remains at an unknown exact position. It is thought that this fossil is younger than the others. Sm 3 was discovered near the village of Poloyo, although other records state that it was discovered near Ngadirejo, which is located between the villages of Poloyo and Chemeng. Several written records state that the calvarium was found on the banks of the Solo River in 1997 during sand excavation by miners for use as construction material. Sm 4 was discovered in October 2001 during further sand collection by workers.

=== Rediscovery ===
After initial discovery by miners, Sm 3 was illegally moved to an antiques store in Jakarta by an unknown agent in 1998. Boedhihartono (1997) briefly described the skull after finding it in the antiquities shop. In spring 1999, it was once again rediscovered from a box in Maxilla & Mandible, Ltd., which is a natural history establishment managed in New York, and this was made public on the 28th of August, 1999. It was brought to the American Museum of Natural history that summer when the cranium was realized to be of ancient age. It was thoroughly examined for eight weeks, of which researchers described, scanned, and photographed the specimen. Henry Galiano, the owner of Maxilla & Mandible, assisted in the cleaning of the sediment-filled endocast and the eventual examination of the specimen. Galiano held a ceremony in his shop, and received awards from the Indonesian government for his willingful cooperation. The specimen was sent back to Indonesia the same year following this discovery.

== Description ==
Sm 2 is around 10 cm long and belongs to the lower section of the shaft. Sm 3 is mineralized and very well preserved in the inner and outer surfaces but is visibly taphonomically deformed, but bears no complete fractures or perforations. Scratches appear to be damages from preparation. Apart from the vault, the splanchnocranium and other major elements of the cranial base are missing. In the parts where the glabella is damaged, the frontal sinus may be accessed. Cranial suture closure suggests a young adult age at death. The cranium has a suite of male and female characters making it difficult to estimate sex, but the authors suggest that the individual was female based on the anatomy of other Javanese H. erectus that are presumed male. It is 178.5 mm long and 145.0 mm in maximum width, with a cranial index of 81. Other authors consider the fossil female due to gracility. The endocast is quite unique for a hominin, except for the related Ngandong crania (which share morphology), being rare in the human record. Sm 4 is probably a male of middle age or younger, having survived the cause of scarring on the frontals and parietals. The anatomy of this individual suggests a morphological and possibly temporal link between the finds at Sangiran and the later population at Ngandong.

== Classification ==
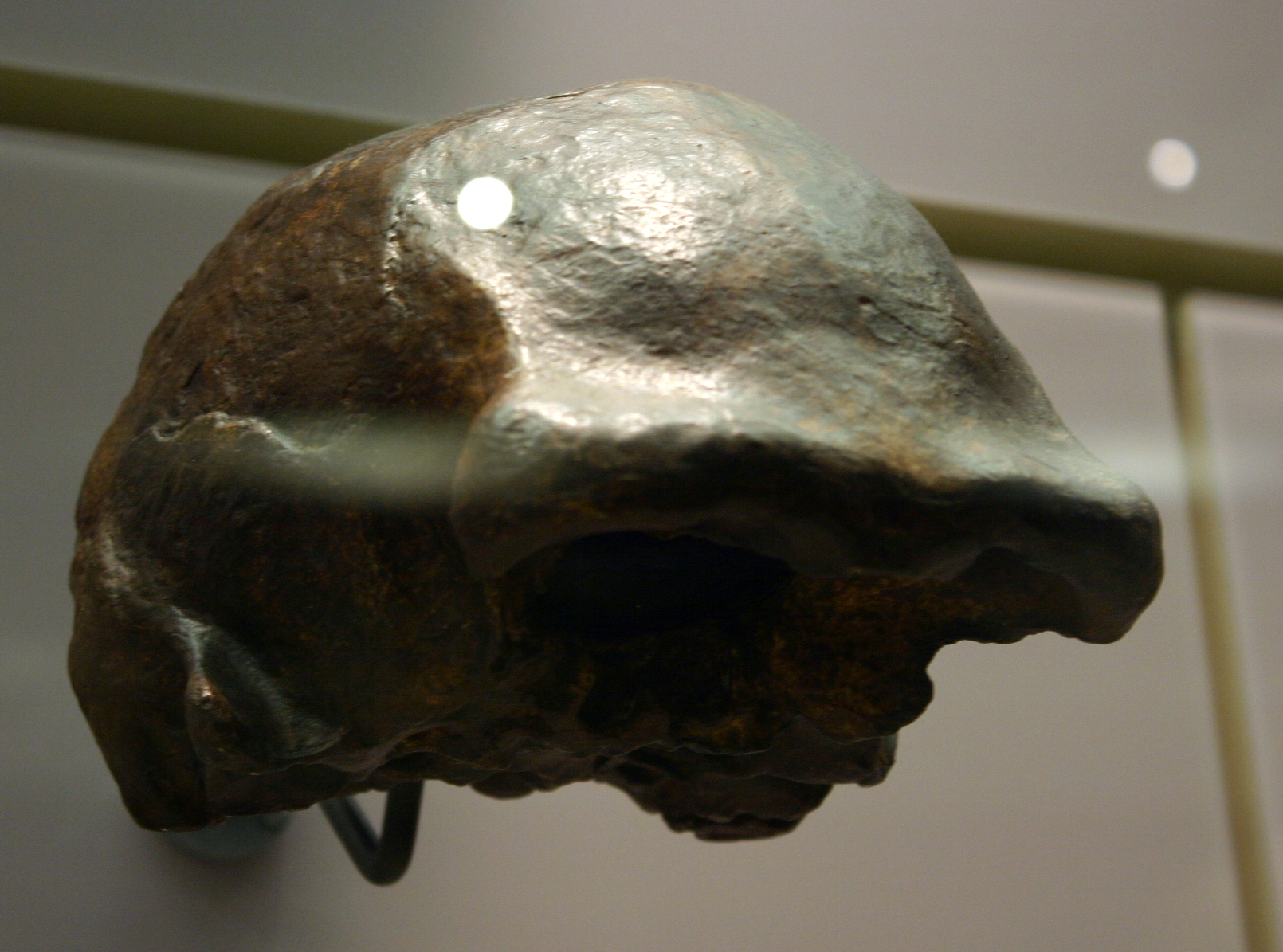
The hominins discovered at Ngandong are related to the ones from Sambungmacan, and are probably temporally younger as well.

Márquez et al. (2001) suggest that the Sm 3 cranium is most like Homo erectus depending on the definition of the species, but the cranium falls within Indonesian variability. They also suggest that the lack of an angular torus, an open occipital/nuchal angle, a supraorbital sulcus that divides, a more globular vault, a frontal that rises upwards, and an occipital torus that is not continuous and bar-like may be seen as potentially irregular. Three possibilities are proposed by the team: that this combination extend the known variation of the species, that they represent morphological change over time, or that the remains represent a novel species of hominin. Antón et al. (2002) suggest that it may represent a small-brained late-stage individual, and notes that further anatomical traits would be required before a potential taxonomic split could reasonably occur. Delson et al. (2001) come to a similar conclusion, finding some anatomical similarity with Homo sapiens, although they are not sure if this ancestor-descendant or standard within the population. Sm 3 is most similar to the Ngandong crania and Sm 1.

The squamotypanic fissure was previously though a distinct feature, but further research determined that a variety of other Homo erectus fossils, such as WT 15000, Sangiran 4 and 17, and OH 9, have similar features. The fossils at Sambungmacan probably represent a regionally isolate population that somewhat diverged from those on the mainland. Specimens of Homo sapiens on the mainland having similar robusticity to the late-surviving populations of Java are sometimes thought to have genetically contributed to one-another, although most suggest that the Javanese populations went extinct without any introgression. Instead, the resemblance appears superficial. It has been suggested that despite being located on an island, Homo erectus avoiding forested areas may have further increased population fragmentation. Laitman and Tattersall (2001) erected the name Homo erectus newyorkensis for the Sm 3 cranium but did not provide a diagnosis.

== Paleoecology ==
Sm 2 was retrieved from consolidated gravel and sand beds from the bottom and north walls of the canal, and although it impossible to determine exactly where the fossil was retrieved or if it was in situ, fluorine dating attempts in 1990 used color and petrifaction to estimate the location. Dating of Sm 3 suggests an age anywhere between 1.8 mya and 53 ka is possible, although its exact age cannot be determined because it was 'rediscovered' in an antiques shop. Dating using these crania and Ngandong reveal a minimum age of 40 ka, and a maximum of 60-70 ka. It is suggested that these populations may not have survived the Toba eruption. Sm 3 and 4 were probably moved from outcrops upstream alongside other animal fossils, forming an area that is composed of several different layers of fauna. The sand the crania were discovered in is alike to the ones of the Kabuh Formation, which is older than the Ngandong finds.
