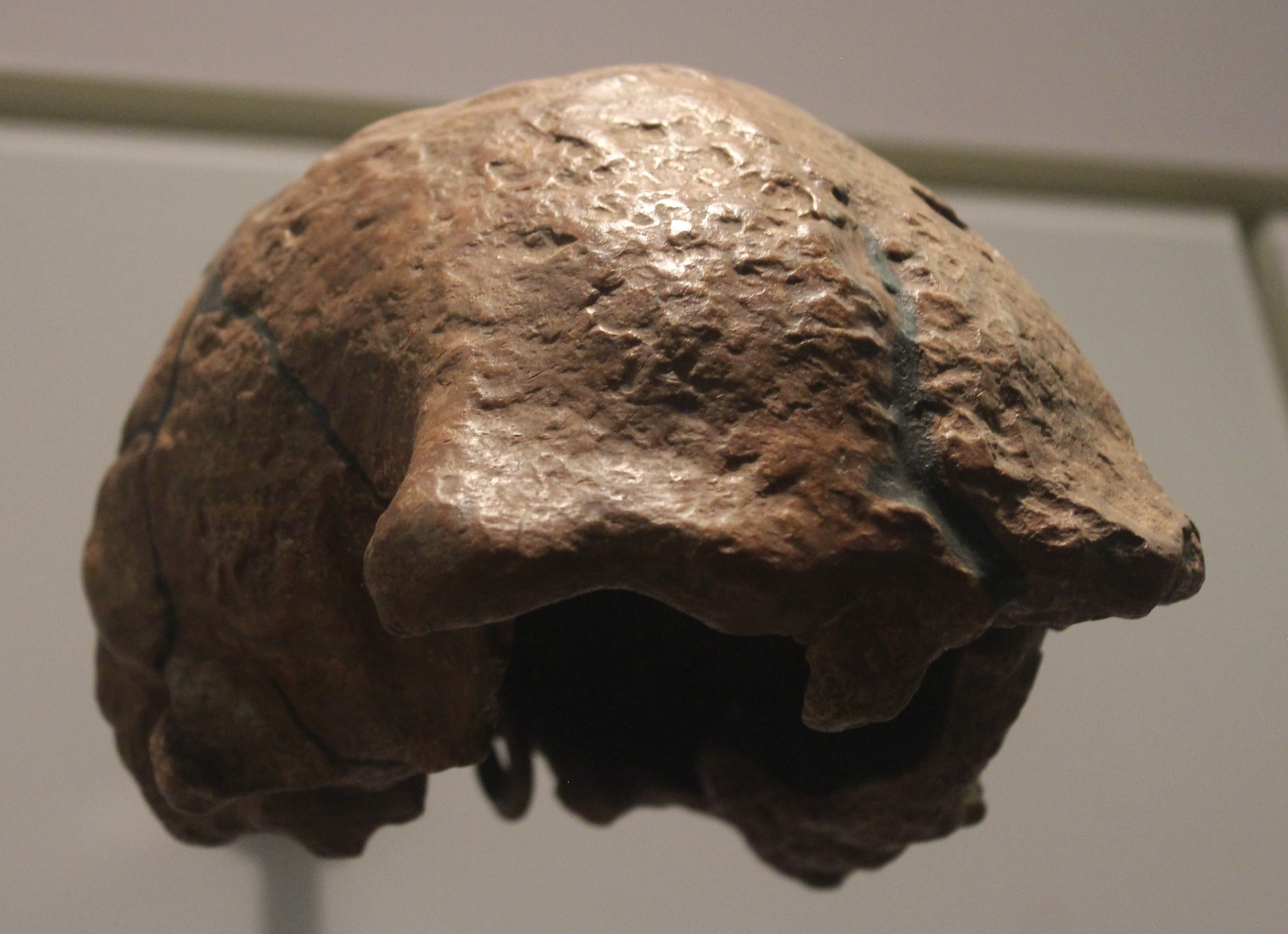
- Cast of Skull X at the Hall of Human Origins, Washington, D.C.

Scientific classification
- Kingdom: Animalia
- Phylum: Chordata
- Class: Mammalia
- Order: Primates
- Superfamily: Hominoidea
- Family: Hominidae
- Genus: Homo
- Species: †H. erectus
- Subspecies: †H. e. soloensis

Trinomial name
- †Homo erectus soloensis Oppenoorth, 1932

Synonyms
- Homo (Javanthropus) soloensis Oppenoorth, 1932; H. sapiens soloensis Dubois, 1940; H. neanderthalensis soloensis Weidenreich, 1940; Pithecanthropus soloensis Jacob, 1973; Pithecanthropus ngandongensis Sartono, 1975; Homo erectus ngandongensis Sartono, 1983

= Solo Man =

Solo Man Temporal range: Late Pleistocene 0.117–0.108 Ma

Extinct subspecies of Homo erectus

Solo Man (Homo erectus soloensis) is a subspecies of H. erectus that lived along the Solo River in Java, Indonesia, about 117,000 to 108,000 years ago in the Late Pleistocene. This population is the last known record of the species. It is known from 14 skullcaps, two tibiae, and a piece of the pelvis excavated near the village of Ngandong, and possibly three skulls from Sambungmacan and a skull from Ngawi depending on classification. The Ngandong site was first excavated from 1931 to 1933 under the direction of Willem Frederik Florus Oppenoorth, Carel ter Haar, and Gustav Heinrich Ralph von Koenigswald, but further study was set back by the Great Depression, World War II and the Indonesian War of Independence. In accordance with historical race concepts, Indonesian H. erectus subspecies were originally classified as the direct ancestors of Aboriginal Australians; however, Solo Man is now thought to have no living descendants as the remains far predate modern human immigration into the area, which began roughly 55,000 to 50,000 years ago.

The Solo Man skull is oval-shaped in top view, with heavy brows, inflated cheekbones, and a prominent bar of bone wrapping around the back. The brain volume was quite large, measuring from 1,013 to 1,251 cubic centimetres (61.8 to 76.3 cu in), which is within the range of variation for present-day modern humans. One potentially female specimen may have been 158 cm (5 ft 2 in) tall and weighed 51 kg (112 lb); males were probably much bigger than females. Solo Man was in many ways similar to the Java Man (H. e. erectus) that had earlier inhabited Java, but was far less archaic.

Solo Man likely inhabited an open woodland environment much cooler than present-day Java, along with elephants, tigers, wild cattle, water buffalo, tapirs, and hippopotamuses, among other megafauna. They manufactured simple flakes and choppers (hand-held stone tools), and possibly spears or harpoons from bones, daggers from stingray stingers, as well as bolas or hammerstones from andesite. They may have descended from or were at least closely related to Java Man. The Ngandong specimens likely died during a volcanic eruption. The species probably went extinct with the takeover of tropical rainforest and loss of preferred habitat, beginning by 125,000 years ago. The skulls sustained damage, but it is unclear if it resulted from an assault, cannibalism, the volcanic eruption, or the fossilisation process.

== Research history ==
Despite what English naturalist Charles Darwin had hypothesised in his 1871 book Descent of Man, many late-19th century evolutionary naturalists postulated that Asia, not Africa, was the birthplace of humankind as it is midway between Europe and America, providing optimal dispersal routes throughout the world (the Out of Asia theory). Among these was German naturalist Ernst Haeckel who argued that the first human species (which he named "Homo primigenius") evolved on the now-disproven hypothetical continent "Lemuria" in what is now Southeast Asia, from a genus he termed "Pithecanthropus" ("ape-man"). "Lemuria" had supposedly sunk below the Indian Ocean, so no fossils could be found to prove this. Nevertheless, Haeckel's model inspired Dutch scientist Eugène Dubois to join the Royal Netherlands East Indies Army (KNIL) and search for his "missing link" in the Indonesian Archipelago. On Java, he found a skullcap and a femur (Java Man) dating to the late Pliocene or early Pleistocene at the Trinil site along the Solo River, which he named "P." erectus (using Haeckel's hypothetical genus name) in 1893. He attempted unsuccessfully to convince the European scientific community that he had found an upright-walking ape-man. They largely dismissed his findings as a malformed non-human ape.

The "apeman of Java" nonetheless stirred up academic interest and, to find more remains, the Prussian Academy of Sciences in Berlin tasked German zoologist Emil Selenka with continuing the excavation of Trinil. Following his death in 1907, excavation was carried out by his wife and fellow zoologist Margarethe Lenore Selenka. Among the members was Dutch geologist Willem Frederik Florus Oppenoorth. The yearlong expedition was unfruitful, but the Geological Survey of Java continued to sponsor the excavation along the Solo River. Some two decades later, the Survey funded several expeditions to update maps of the island. Oppenoorth was made the head of the Java Mapping Program in 1930. One of their missions was to firmly distinguish Tertiary and Quaternary deposits; among the relevant sites a bed dating to the Pleistocene discovered by Dutch geologist Carel ter Haar in 1931, downriver from the Trinil site, near the village of Ngandong.

Location of Ngandong on the island of Java

From 1931 to 1933, 12 human skull pieces (including well-preserved skullcaps), as well as two right tibiae (shinbones), one of which was essentially complete, were recovered under the direction of Oppenoorth, ter Haar, and German-Dutch geologist Gustav Heinrich Ralph von Koenigswald. Midway through excavation, Oppenoorth retired from the Survey and returned to the Netherlands, replaced by Polish geologist Józef Zwierzycki in 1933. At the same time, because of the Great Depression, the Survey's focus shifted to economically relevant geology, namely petroleum deposits, and the excavation of Ngandong ceased completely. In 1934, ter Haar published important summaries of the Ngandong operations before contracting tuberculosis. He returned to the Netherlands and died two years later. Von Koenigswald, who was hired principally to study Javan mammals, was fired in 1934. After much lobbying by Zwierzycki in the Survey, and after receiving funding from the Carnegie Institution for Science, von Koenigswald regained his position in 1937, but was too preoccupied with the Sangiran site to continue research at Ngandong.

In 1935, the Solo Man remains were transported to Batavia (today, Jakarta, Java, Indonesia) in the care of local university professor Willem Alphonse Mijsberg, with the hope he would take over study of the specimens. Before he had the opportunity, the fossils were moved to Bandung, West Java in 1942 because of the Japanese occupation of the Dutch East Indies. Japanese forces interned von Koenigswald for 32 months. At the cessation of the war, he was released, but the Indonesian War of Independence erupted. Jewish-German anthropologist Franz Weidenreich (who fled China before the Japanese invasion in 1941) arranged with the Rockefeller Foundation and The Viking Fund for von Koenigswald, his wife Luitgarde, and the Javan human remains (including Solo Man) to come to New York. Von Koenigswald and Weidenreich studied the material at the American Museum of Natural History until Weidenreich's death in 1948 (leaving behind a monograph on Solo Man posthumously published in 1951). In his 1956 book Meeting Prehistoric Men, von Koenigswald included a 14-page account of the Ngandong project with several unpublished results. The Solo Man remains came to be stored at Utrecht University, the Netherlands. In 1967, von Koenigswald gave the material to Teuku Jacob for his doctoral research. Jacob oversaw the excavation of Ngandong from 1976 to 1978 and recovered two more skull specimens and a pelvic fragment. In 1978, von Koenigswald returned the material to Indonesia, and the Solo Man remains were moved to the Gadjah Mada University, Special Region of Yogyakarta (south-central Java).

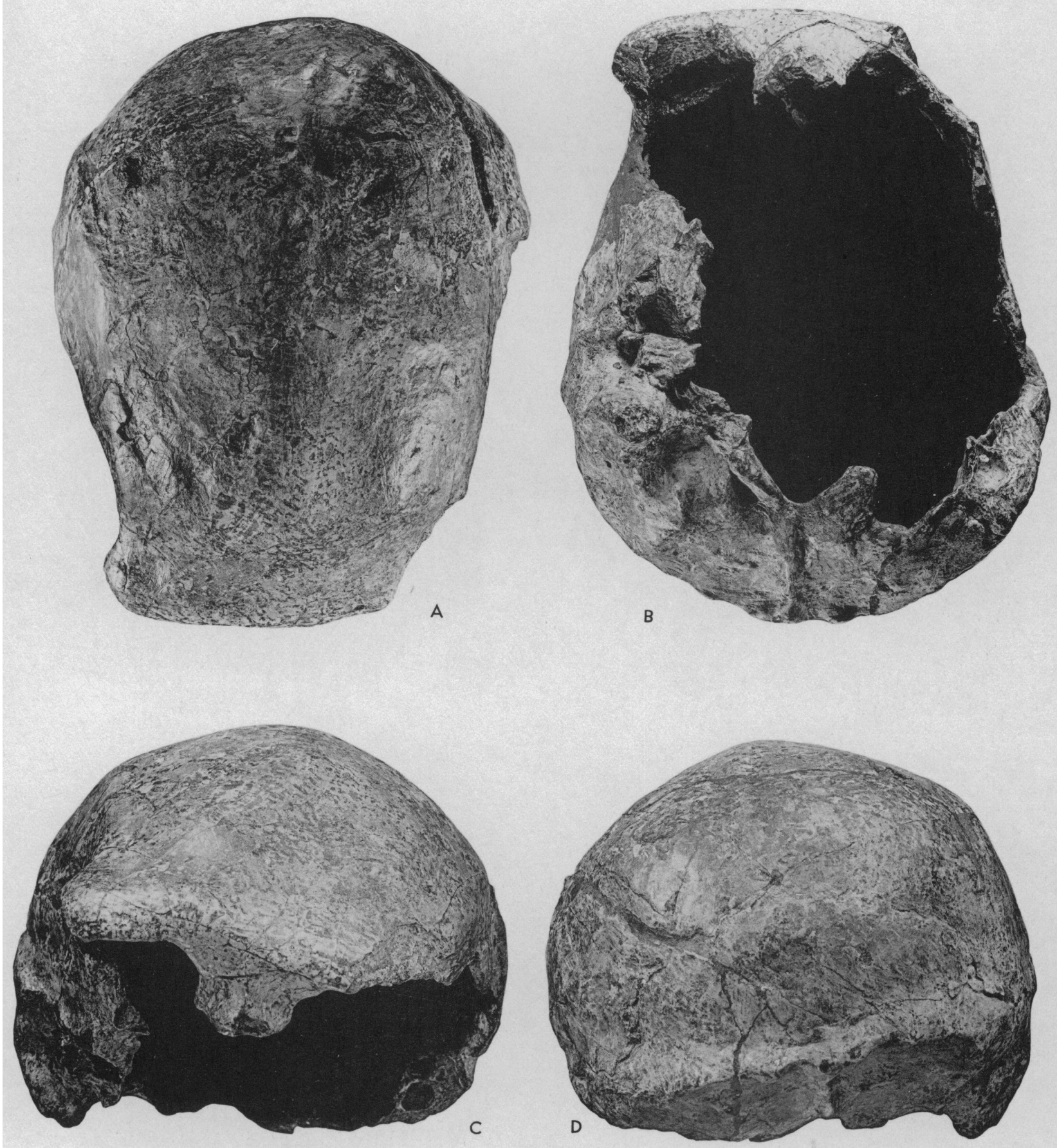
Skull I

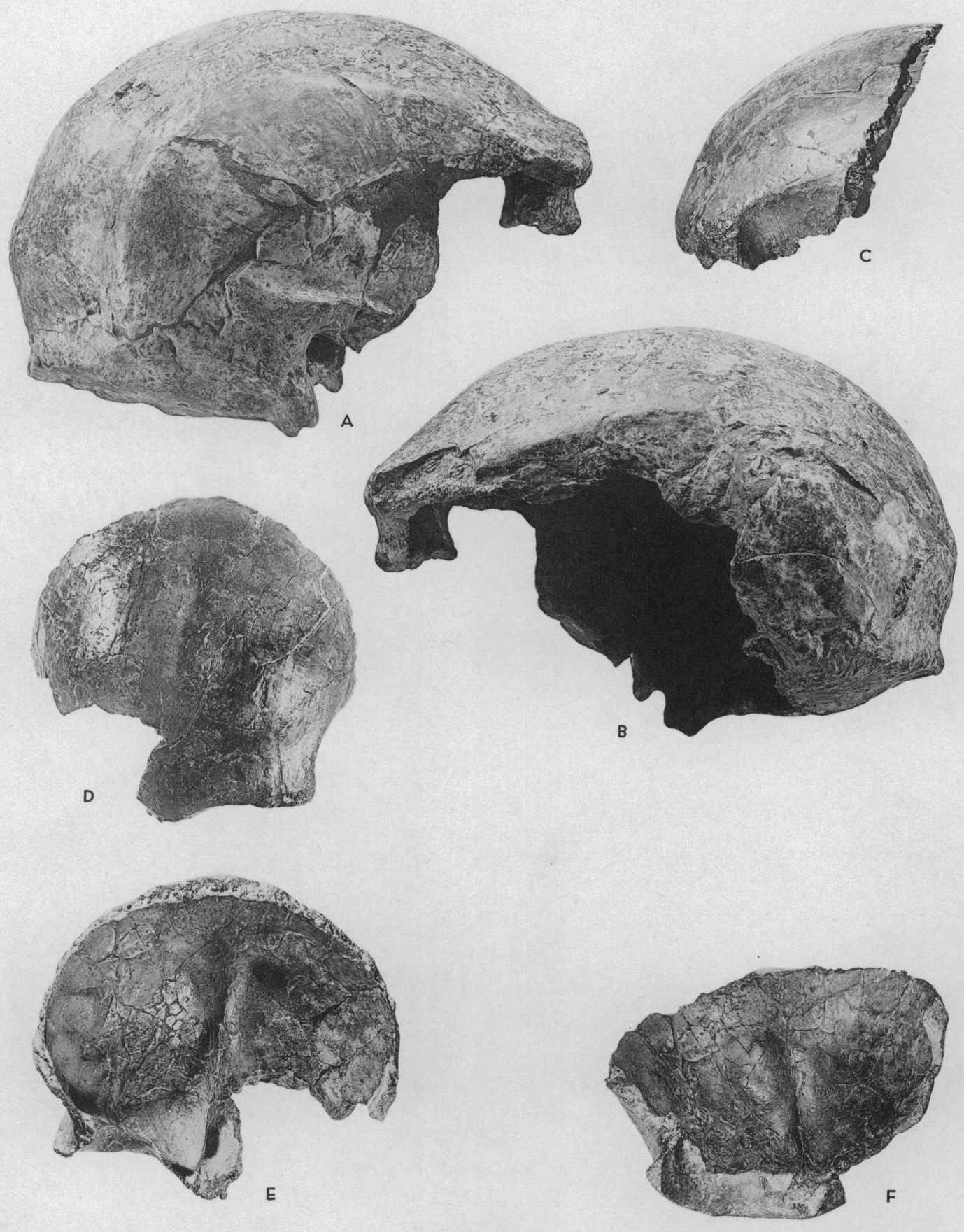
Skulls I and II

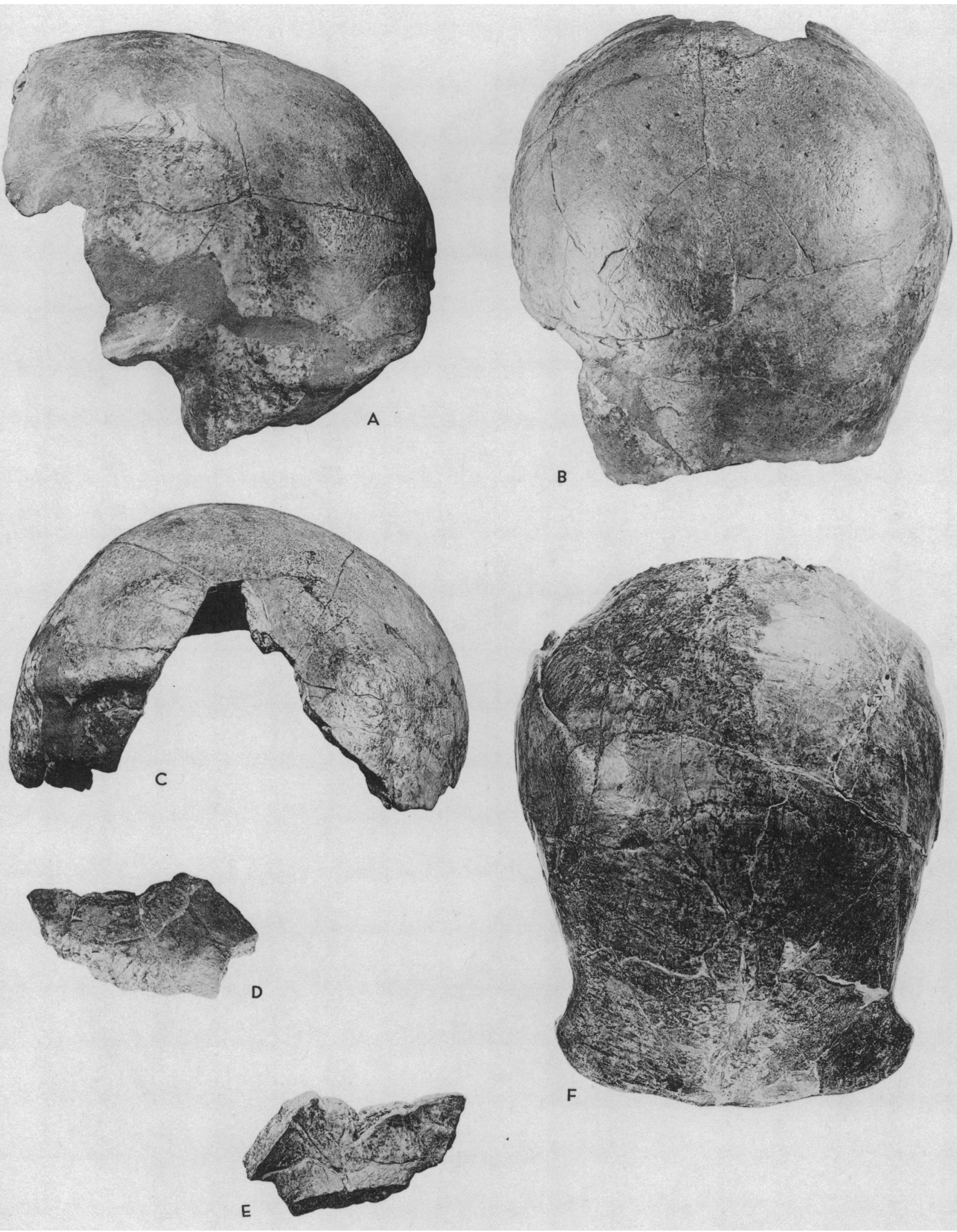
Skulls III and IV

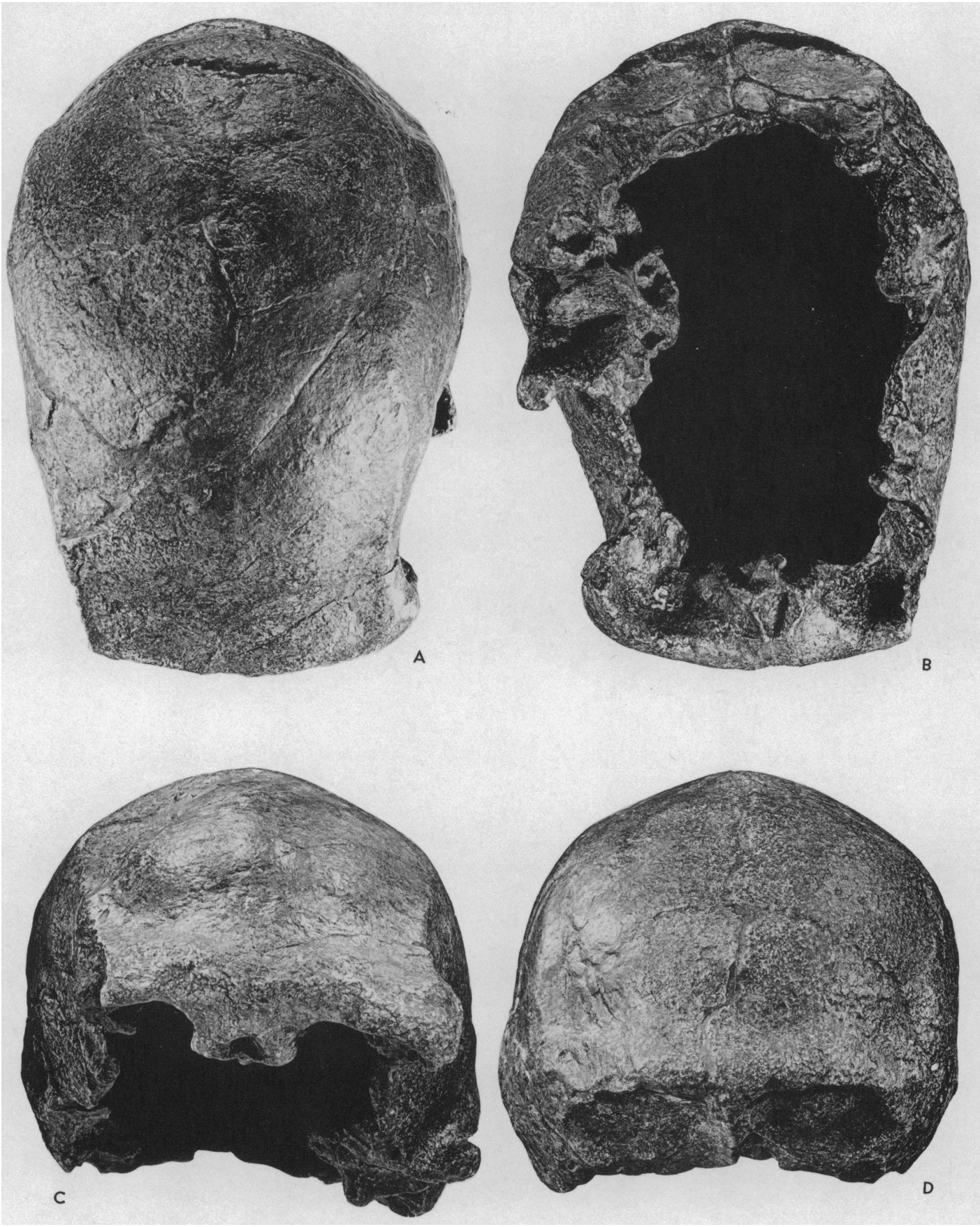
Skull V

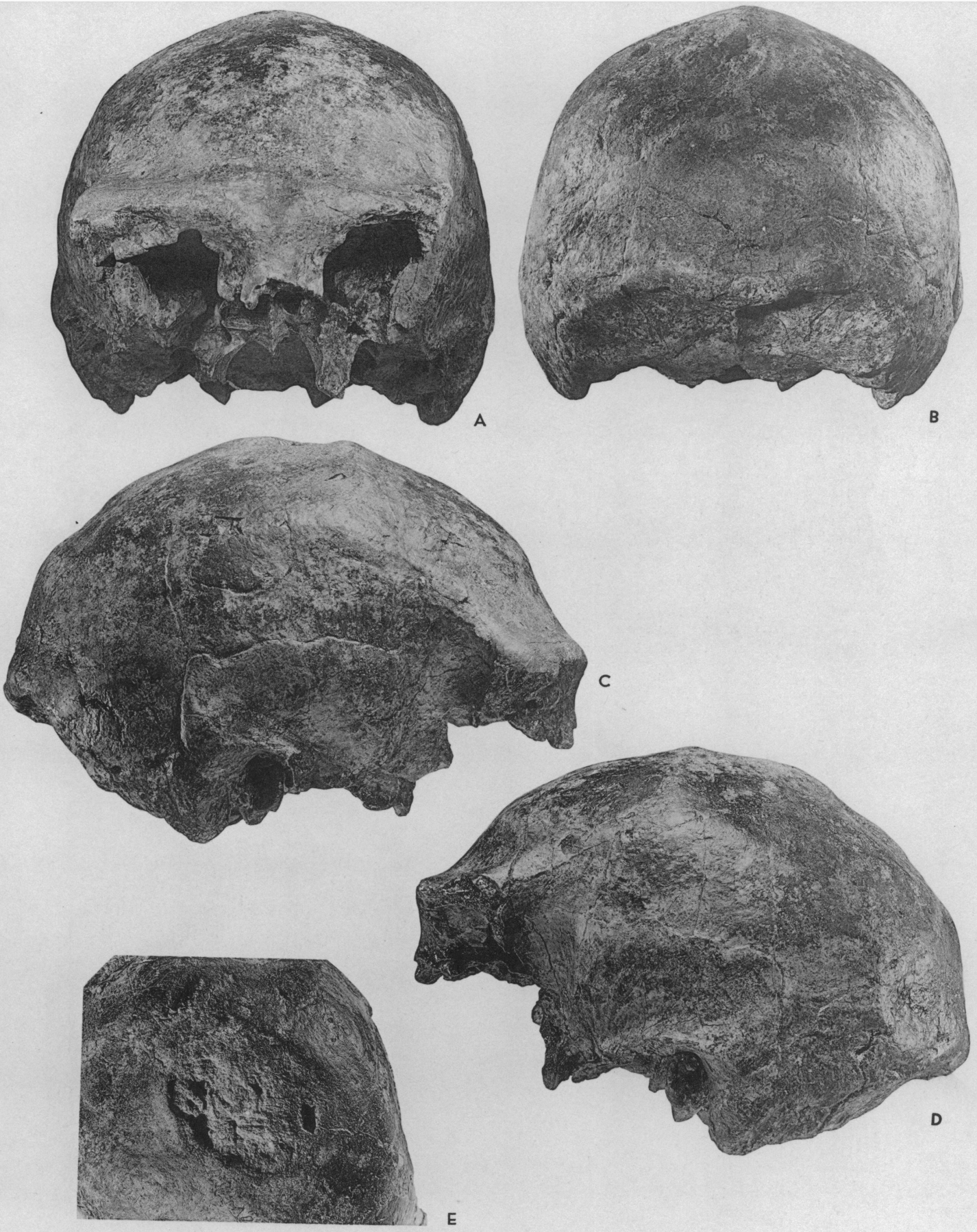
Skull VI

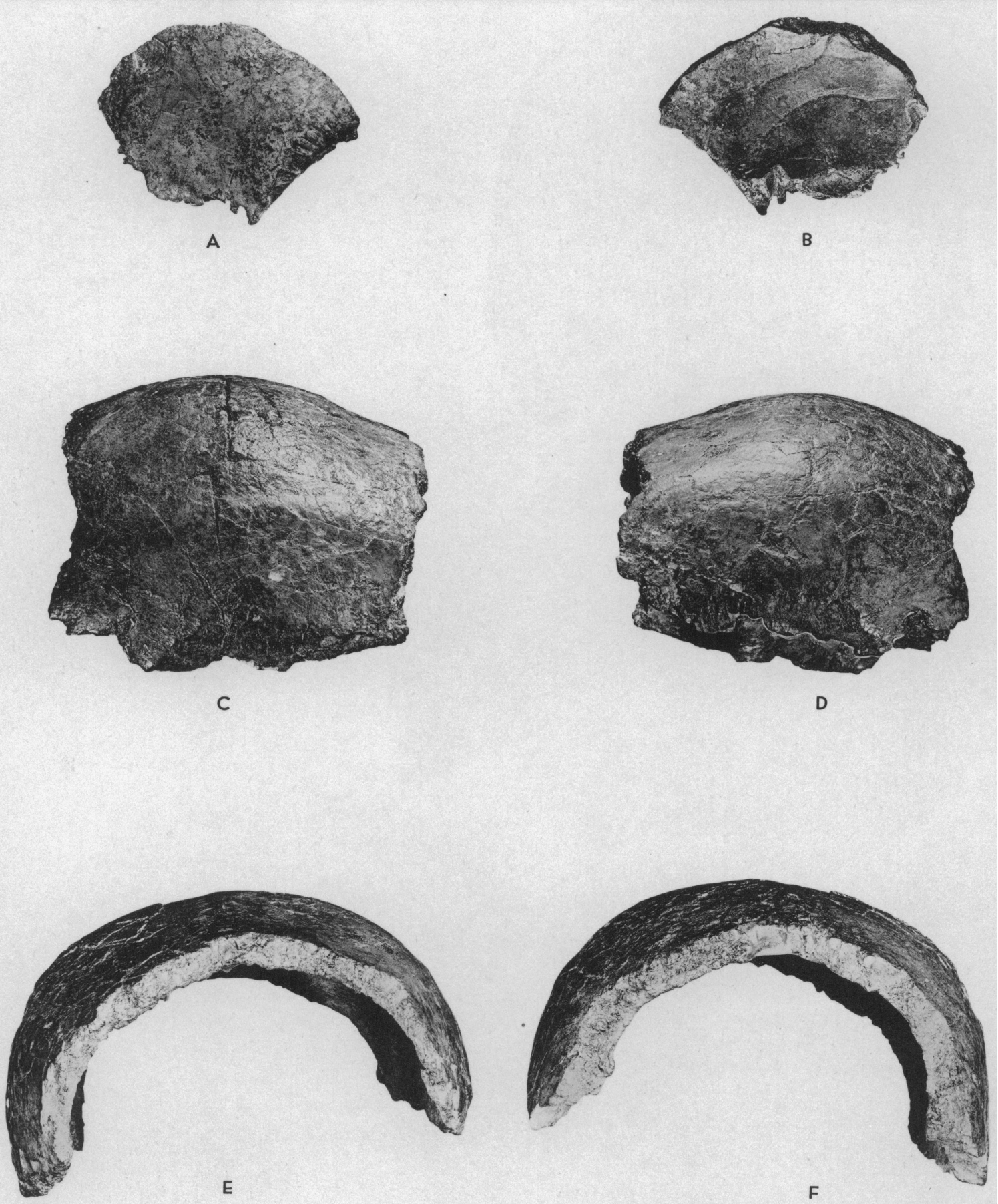
Skulls VII and VIII

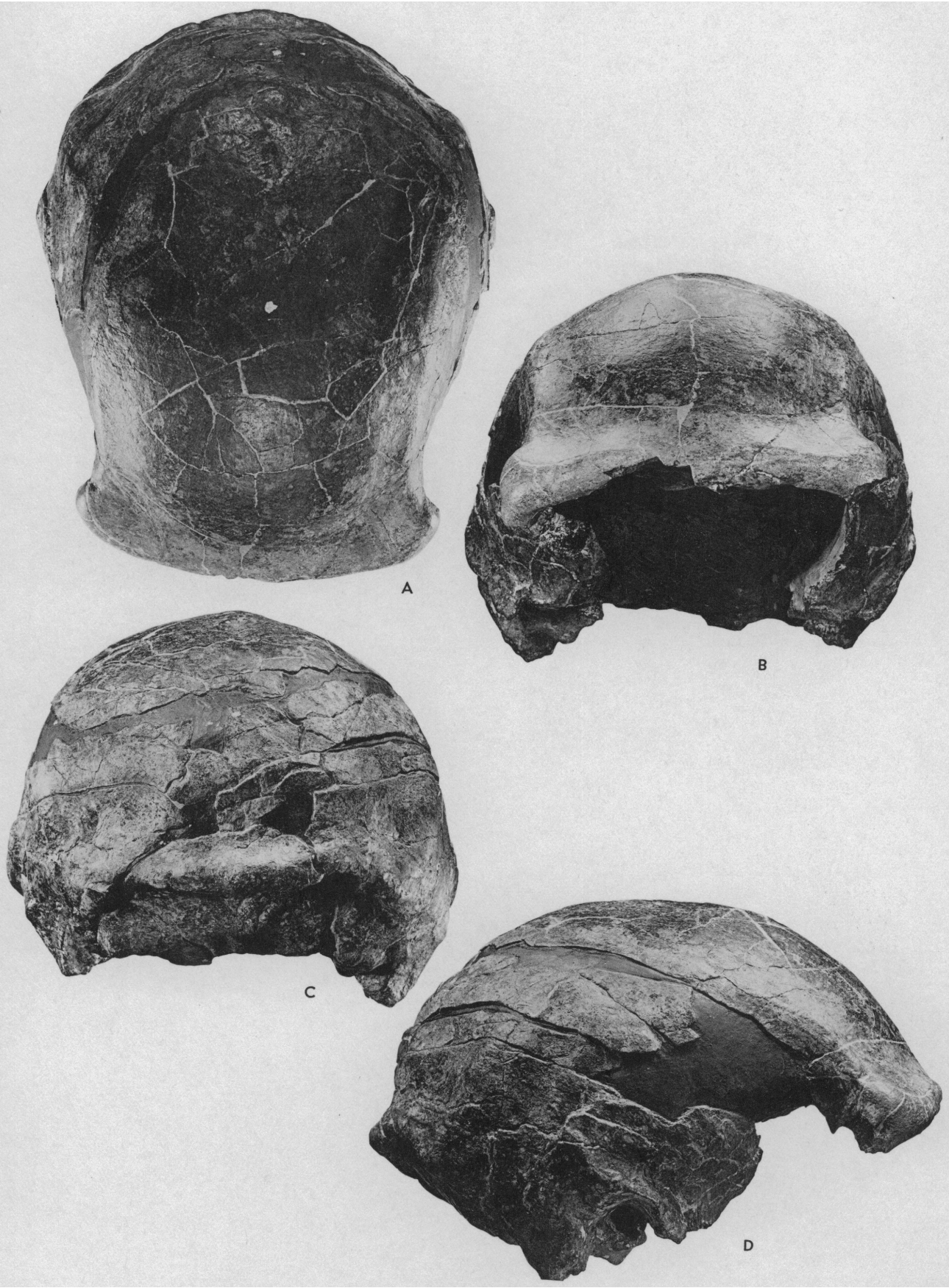
Skull IX

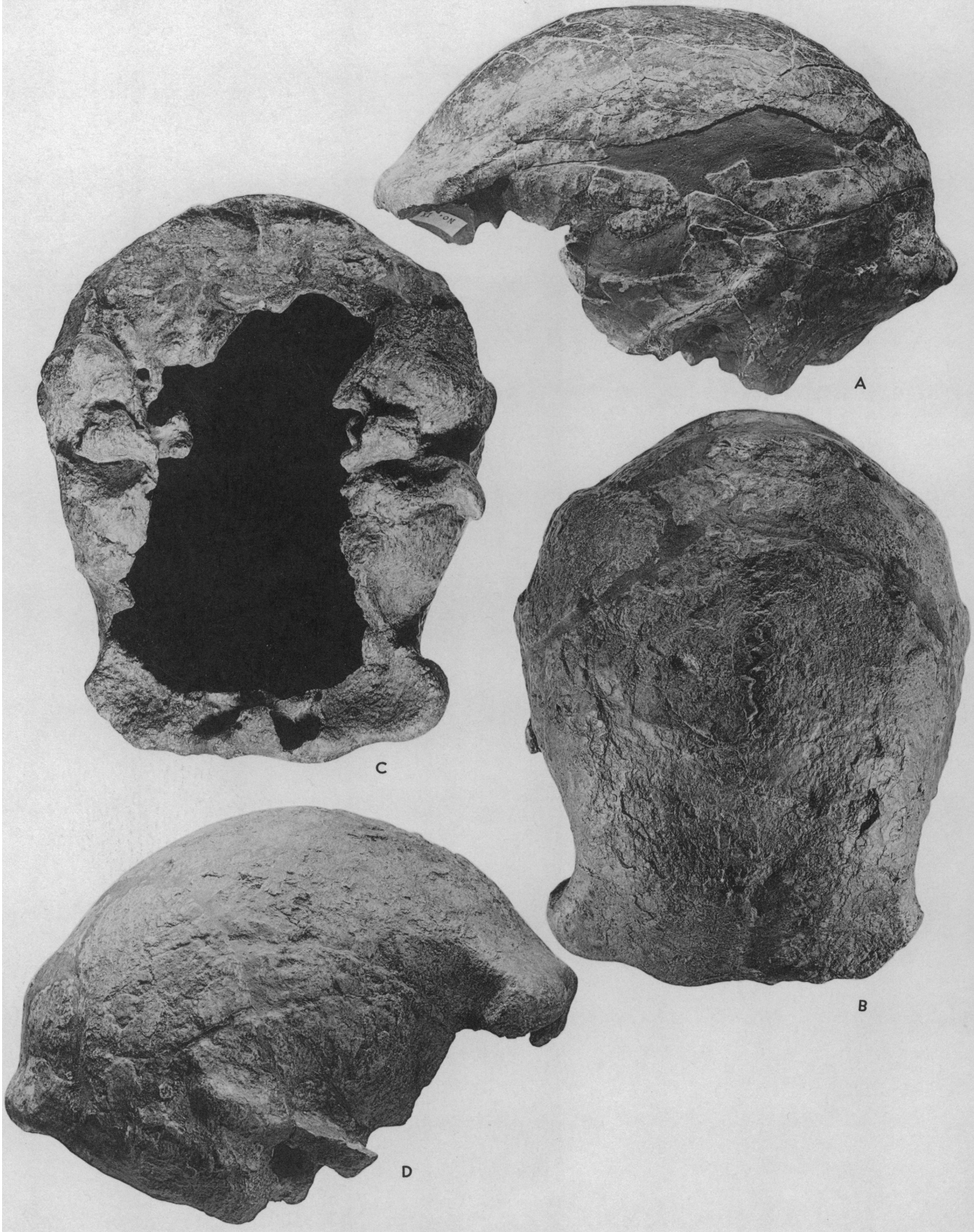
Skulls IX and X

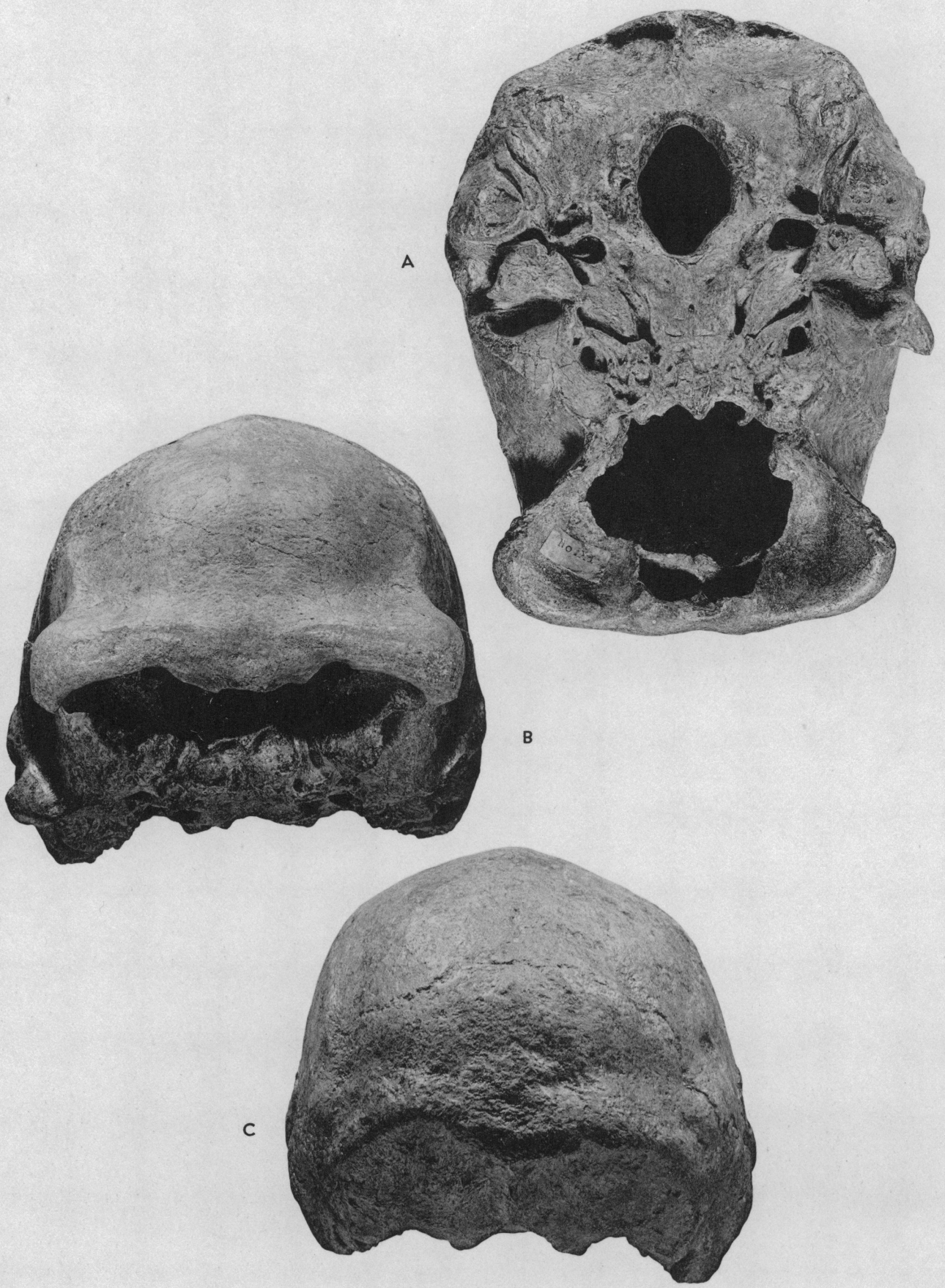
Skull XI

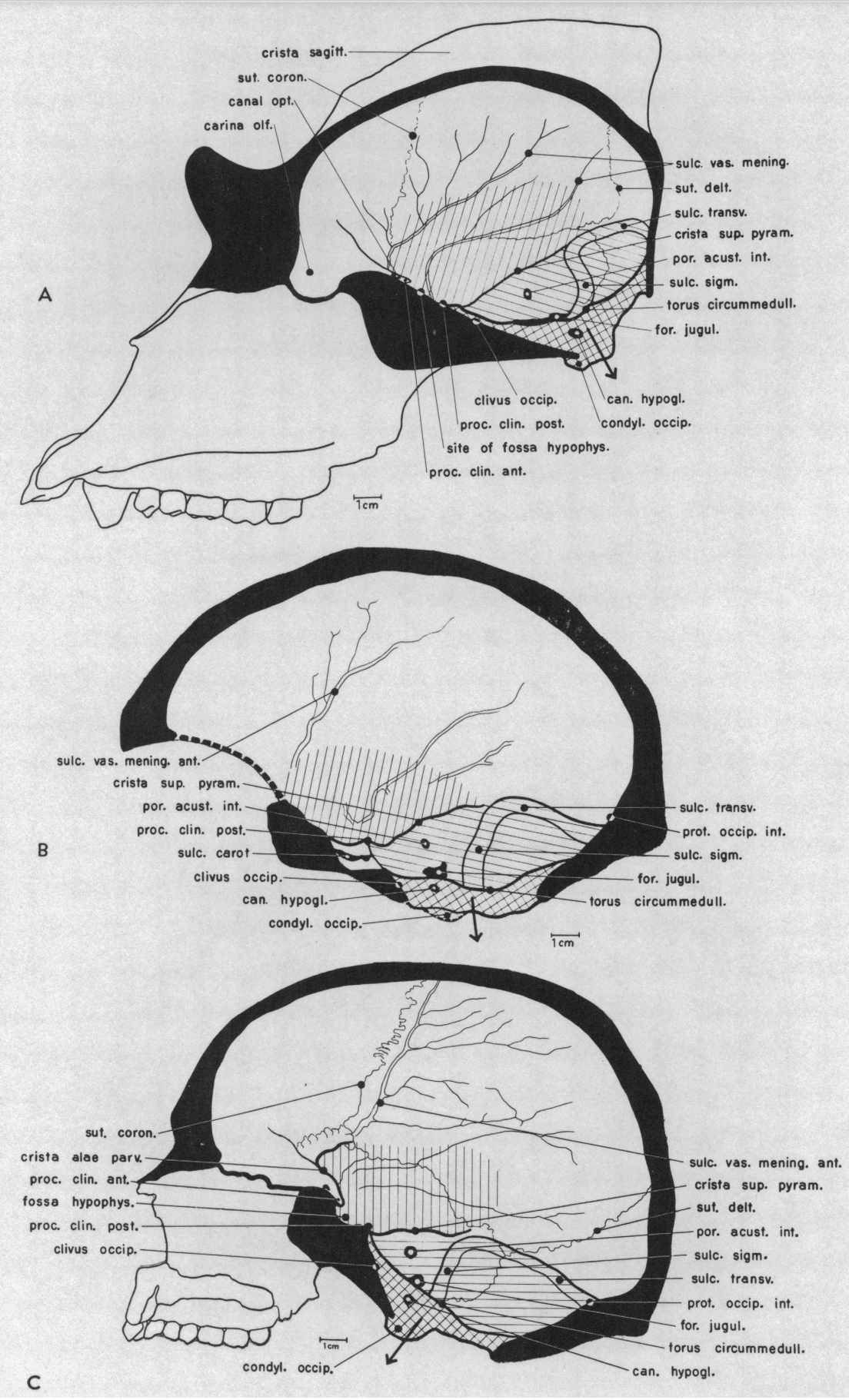
Gorilla, Solo, and modern endocasts

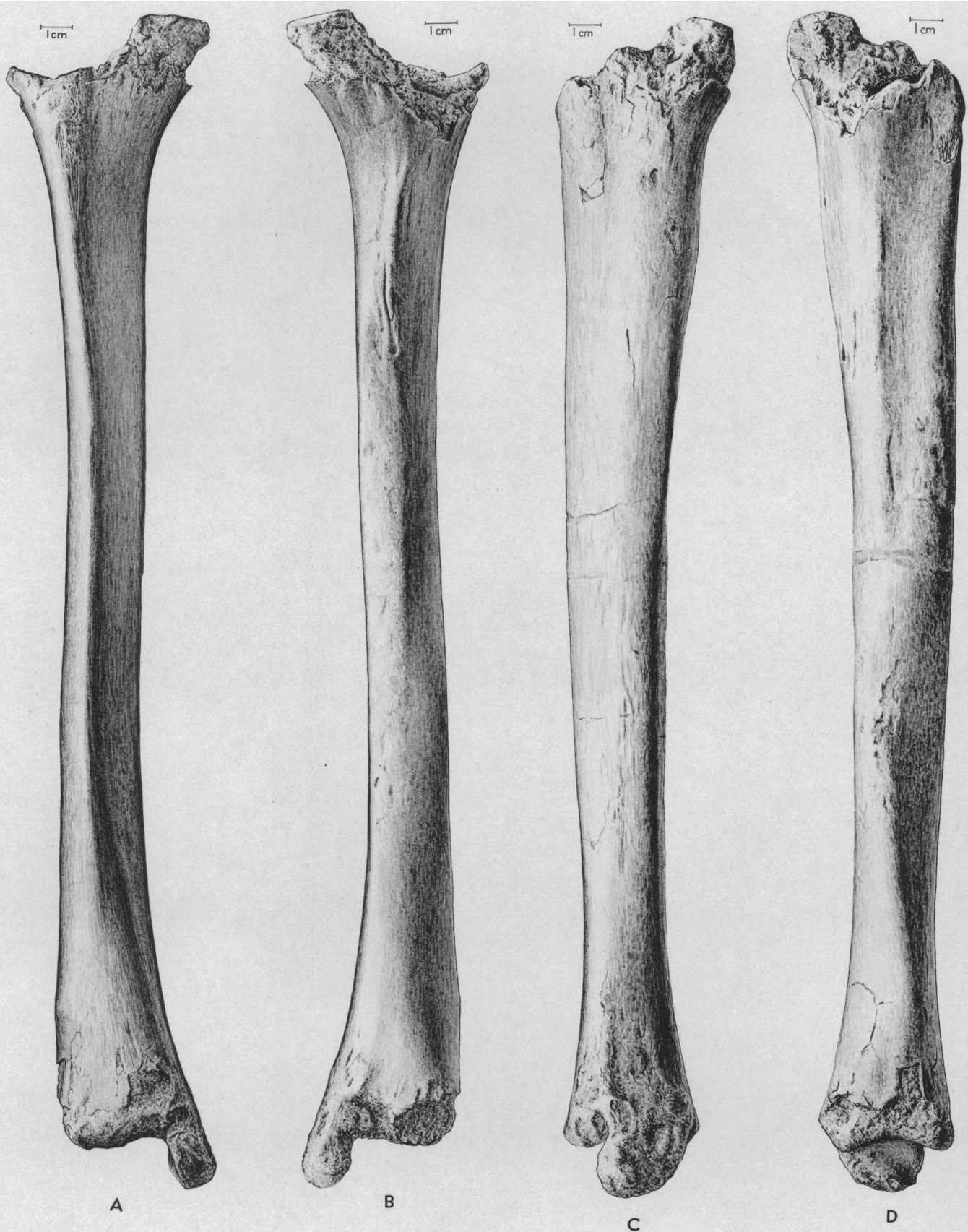
Tibia B

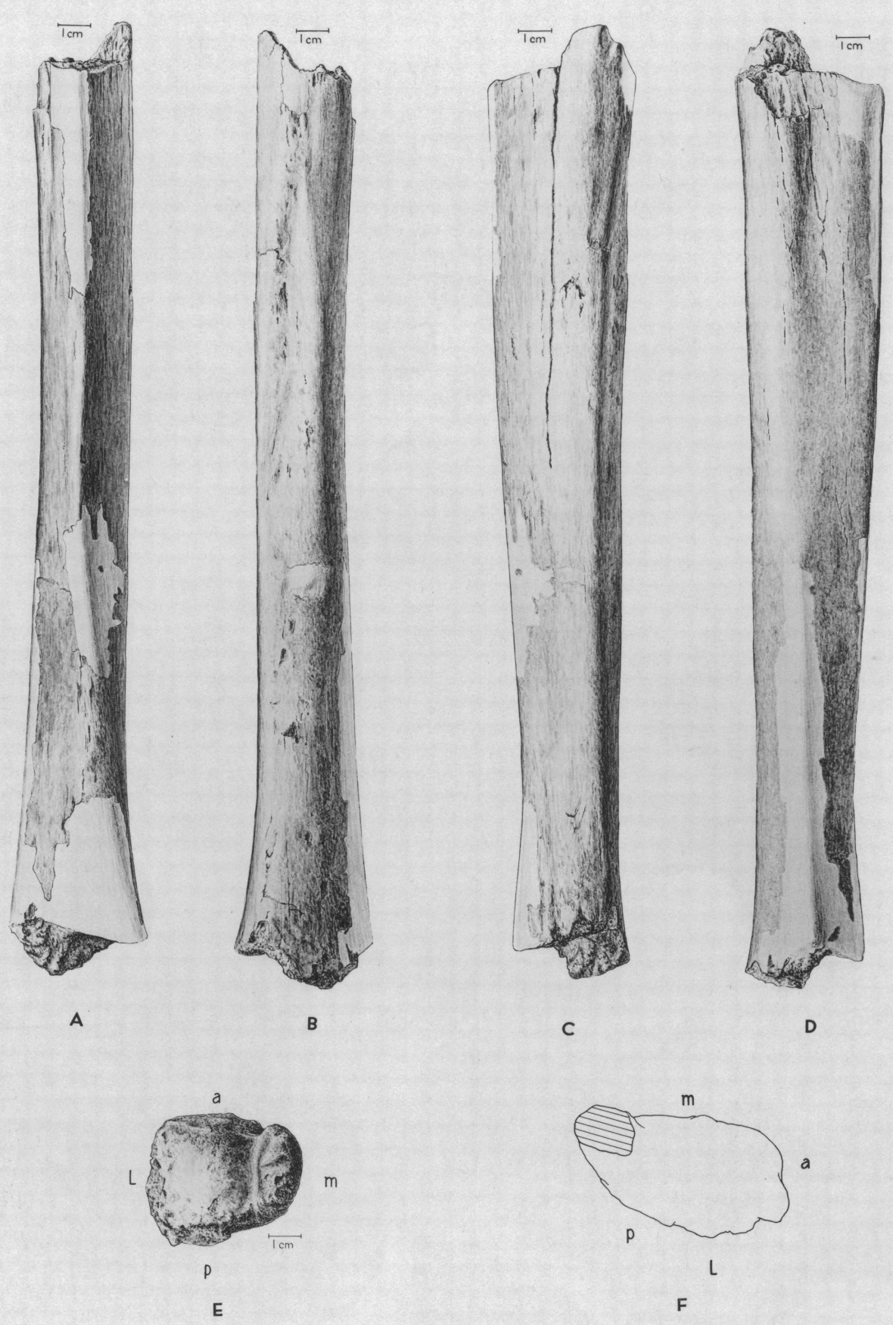
Tibiae A (right) and B (left)

The specimens are:

- Skull I, an almost complete skullcap probably belonging to an elderly female;
- Skull II, a frontal bone probably belonging to a three to seven-year-old child;
- Skull III, a warped skullcap probably belonging to an elderly individual;
- Skull IV, a skullcap probably belonging to a middle-aged female;
- Skull V, a probable male skullcap—indicated by its great length of 221 mm (8.7 in);
- Skull VI, an almost complete skullcap probably belonging to an adult female;
- Skull VII, a right parietal bone fragment probably belonging to a young, possibly female, individual;
- Skull VIII, both parietal bones (separated) possibly belonging to a young male;
- Skull IX, a skullcap missing the base probably belonging to an elderly individual (the small size is consistent with a female, but the heaviness is consistent with a male);
- Skull X, a shattered skullcap probably belonging to a robust elderly female;
- Skull XI, a nearly complete skullcap;
- Tibia A, a few fragments of the shaft, measuring 101 mm (4.0 in) in diameter at the mid-shaft, probably belonging to an adult male;
- Tibia B, a nearly complete right tibia measuring 365 mm (14.4 in) in length at 86 mm (3.4 in) in diameter at the mid-shaft, probably belonging to an adult female;
- Ngandong 15, a partial skullcap;
- Ngandong 16, a left parietal fragment; and
- Ngandong 17, a 4 cm × 6 cm (1.6 in × 2.4 in) left acetabulum (on the pelvis which forms part of the hip joint).

== Age and taphonomy ==
The location of these fossils in the Solo terrace at the time of discovery was poorly documented. Oppenoorth, ter Haar, and von Koenigswald were only on site for 24 days of the 27 months of operation as they needed to oversee other Tertiary sites for the Survey. They left their geological assistants — Samsi and Panudju — to oversee the dig; their records are now lost. The Survey's site map remained unpublished until 2010 (over 75 years later) and is of limited use now, so the taphonomy and geological age of Solo Man have been contentious matters. All 14 specimens were reported to have been found in the upper section of Layer II (of six layers), which is a 46 cm (18 in)-thick stratum with gravelly sand and volcaniclastic hypersthene andesite. They are thought to have been deposited at around the same time, probably in a now-dry arm of the Solo River, about 20 m (66 ft) above the modern river. The site is about 40 m (130 ft) above sea level.

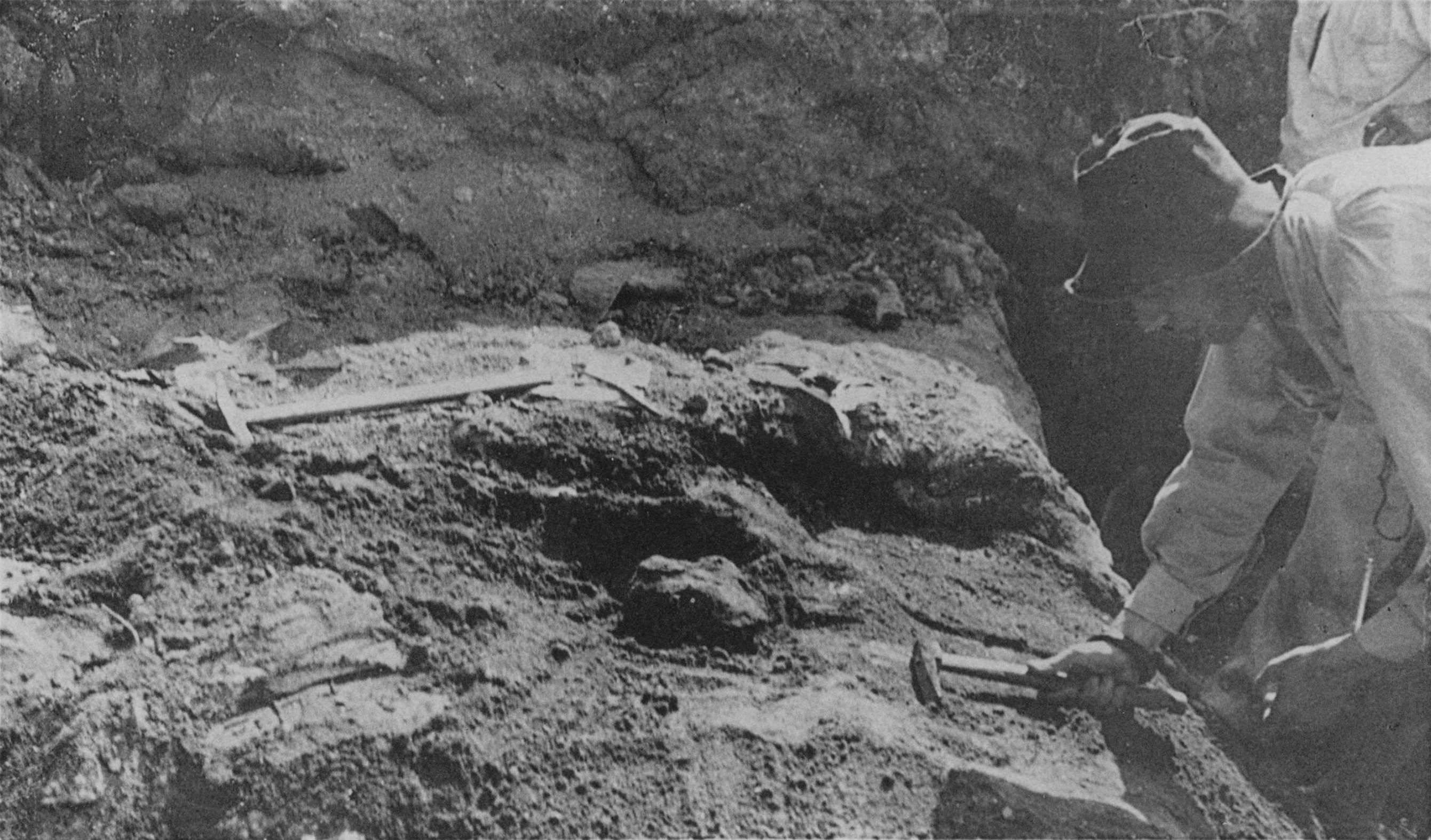
Excavation of Skull VI at Ngandong, 1932

Volcaniclastic rock indicates deposition occurred soon after a volcanic eruption. Because of the sheer volume of fossils, humans and animals may have concentrated in great numbers in the valley upstream from the site due to the eruption or extreme drought. The ash would have poisoned the vegetation, or at least impeded its growth, leading to starvation and death among herbivores and humans, accumulating a mass of carcasses decomposing over several months. A lack of carnivore damage may indicate sufficient feeding was possible without having to resort to crunching through the bone. When the monsoon season came, lahars streaming from the volcano through the river channels swept the carcasses to the Ngandong site, where they and other debris created a jam because of the channel narrowing there. The H. erectus fossils from Sambungmacan, also along the Solo River, were possibly deposited in the same event.

The dating attempts are:

- In 1932, based on the site's height above the present-day river, Oppenoorth suggested Solo Man dated to the Eemian interglacial, which at the time was roughly constrained to 150 to 100 thousand years ago from the Middle/Late Pleistocene transition. Later biochronological studies (using the animal remains to constrain the age) within the next few years by Oppenoorth in 1932, von Koenigswald in 1934, and ter Haar in 1936 agreed with a Late Pleistocene date.
- The Solo Man remains were first radiometrically dated in 1988 and again in 1989, using uranium–thorium dating, to 200 to 30 thousand years ago, a wide error range.
- In 1996, Solo Man teeth were dated, using electron spin resonance dating (ESR) and uranium–thorium isotope-ratio mass spectrometry, to 53.3 to 27 thousand years ago; this would mean Solo Man outlasted continental H. erectus by at minimum 250,000 years and was contemporaneous with modern humans in Southeast Asia, who immigrated roughly 55 to 50 thousand years ago.
- In 2008, gamma spectroscopy on three of the skulls showed they experienced uranium leaching, and the Solo Man remains were re-dated to roughly 70 to 40 thousand years ago. This would still make it possible Solo Man was contemporaneous with modern humans.
- In 2011, argon–argon dating of pumice hornblende yielded a maximum age of 546 ± 12 thousand years ago, and ESR and uranium–thorium dating of a mammal bone just downstream at the Jigar I site a minimum age of 143 to 77 thousand years ago. This extended interval would make it possible Solo Man was contemporaneous with continental H. erectus, long before modern humans dispersed across the continent.
- In 2020, the first comprehensive chronology of the Ngandong site was published which found the Solo River was diverted through the site 500,000 years ago; the Solo terrace was deposited over 316 to 31 thousand years ago; the Ngandong terrace 141 to 92 thousand years ago; and the H. erectus bone bed 117 to 108 thousand years ago. This would mean Solo Man is indeed the last known H. erectus population and did not interact with modern humans.

== Classification ==
=== Raciology ===
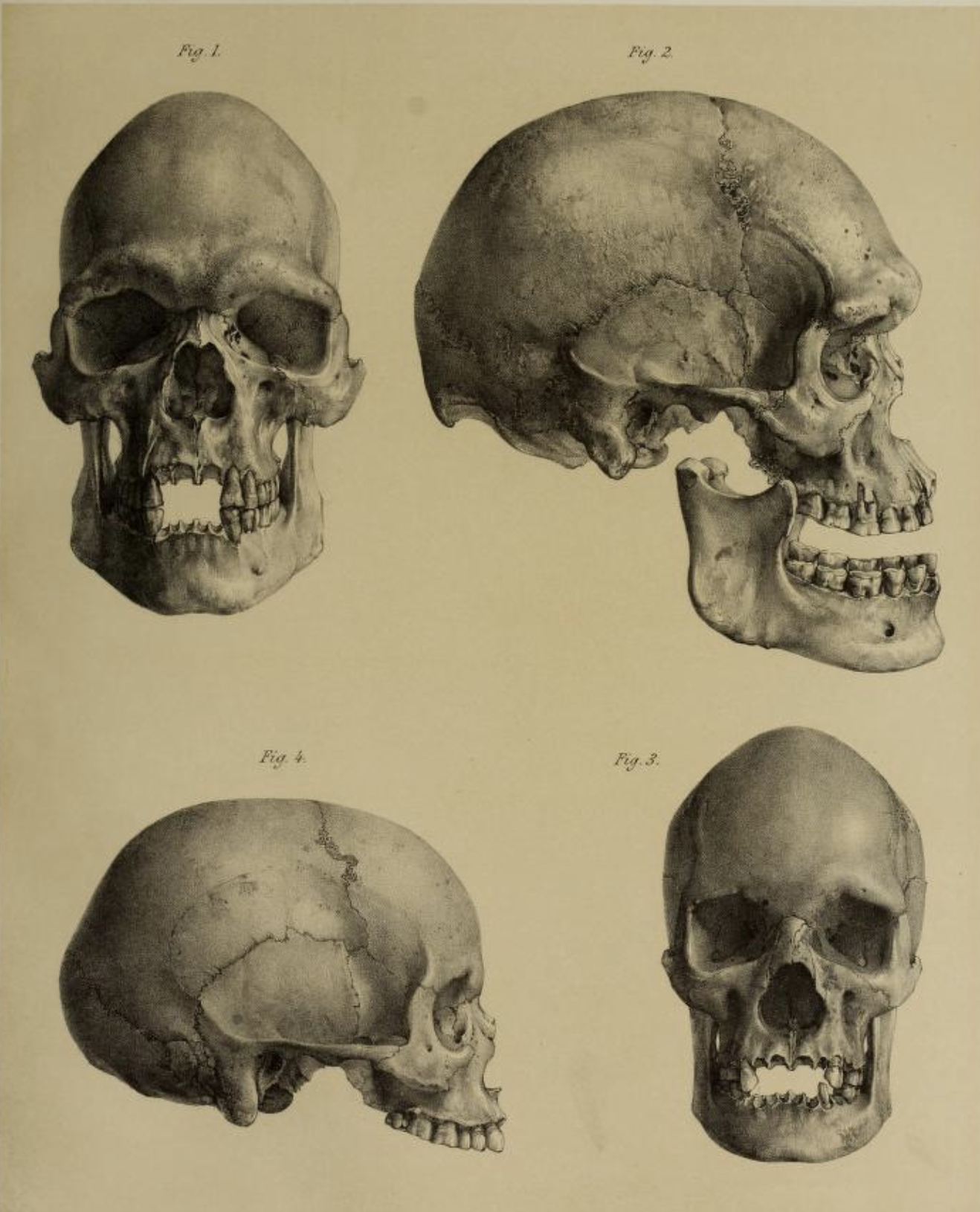
Three skulls Sir William Turner used to racially define Aboriginal Australians in 1884 (Solo Man was later classified as ancestral to this population)

The racial classification of Aboriginal Australians, because of the robustness of the skull compared to that of other modern-day populations, has historically been a complicated question for European science since Johann Friedrich Blumenbach (the founder of physical anthropology) introduced the topic in 1795 in his De Generis Humani Varietate Nativa ("On the Natural History of Mankind"). Following the conception of evolution by Darwin, English anthropologist Thomas Henry Huxley suggested an ancestor–descendant relationship between European Neanderthals and Aboriginal Australians in 1863, which was furthered by later racial anthropologists until the discovery of Indonesian archaic humans.

In 1932, Oppenoorth preliminarily drew parallels between the Solo Man skull and that of Rhodesian Man from Africa, Neanderthals, and modern day Aboriginal Australians. At the time, humans were generally believed to have originated in Central Asia, as championed primarily by American palaeontologist Henry Fairfield Osborn and his protégé William Diller Matthew. They believed Asia was the "mother of continents" and the rising of the Himalayas and Tibet and subsequent drying of the region forced human ancestors to become terrestrial and bipedal. They maintained that populations which retreated to the tropics – namely Dubois's Java Man and the "Negroid race" — substantially regressed (degeneration theory). They also rejected Raymond Dart's South African Taung child (Australopithecus africanus) as a human ancestor, favouring the hoax Piltdown Man from Britain. At first, Oppenoorth believed the Ngandong material represented an Asian type of Neanderthal which was more closely allied with the Rhodesian Man (also considered a Neanderthal type), and gave it a generic distinction as "Javanthropus soloensis". Dubois considered Solo Man to be more or less identical to the East Javan Wajak Man (now classified as a modern human), so Oppenoorth subsequently began using the name "Homo (Javanthropus) soloensis". Oppenoorth hypothesised that the Java Man evolved in Indonesia and was the predecessor of modern-day Aboriginal Australians, Solo Man being a transitional fossil. He considered Rhodesian Man a member of this same group. As for the Chinese Peking Man (now H. e. pekinensis), he believed it dispersed west and gave rise to the Neanderthals.

Thus, the ancient Java Man, Solo Man, and Rhodesian Man were commonly grouped together in the "Pithecanthropoid-Australoid" lineage. "Australoid" includes Aboriginal Australians and Melanesians. This was an extension of the multiregional origin of modern humans championed by Weidenreich and American racial anthropologist Carleton S. Coon, who believed that all modern races and ethnicities (which were classified into separate subspecies or even species until the mid-20th century) evolved independently from a local archaic human species (polygenism). Aboriginal Australians were considered the most primitive race alive. In the 1950s, German evolutionary biologist Ernst Mayr entered the field of palaeoanthropology, and, surveying a "bewildering diversity of names", decided to define only three species of Homo: "H. transvaalensis" (the australopithecines), H. erectus (including Solo Man and several putative African and Asian taxa), and Homo sapiens (including anything younger than H. erectus, such as modern humans and Neanderthals). Mayr defined them as a sequential lineage, each species evolving into the next (chronospecies). Though Mayr later changed his opinion on the australopithecines (recognising Australopithecus), and a few species have since been named or regained some acceptance, his more conservative view of archaic human diversity became widely adopted in the subsequent decades.

Though Mayr did not expand upon the subspecies of H. erectus, subsequent authors began formally sinking species from all parts of the Old World into it. Solo Man was placed into the "Neanderthal/Neanderthalien/Neanderthaloid group" by Weidenreich in the 1940s, which he reserved for specimens apparently transitional between H. erectus and H. sapiens. The group could also be classified under the now-defunct genus "Palaeoanthropus". Solo man was first classified as a subspecies of H. erectus by Coon in his 1962 book The Origin of Races.

=== Assimilation ===
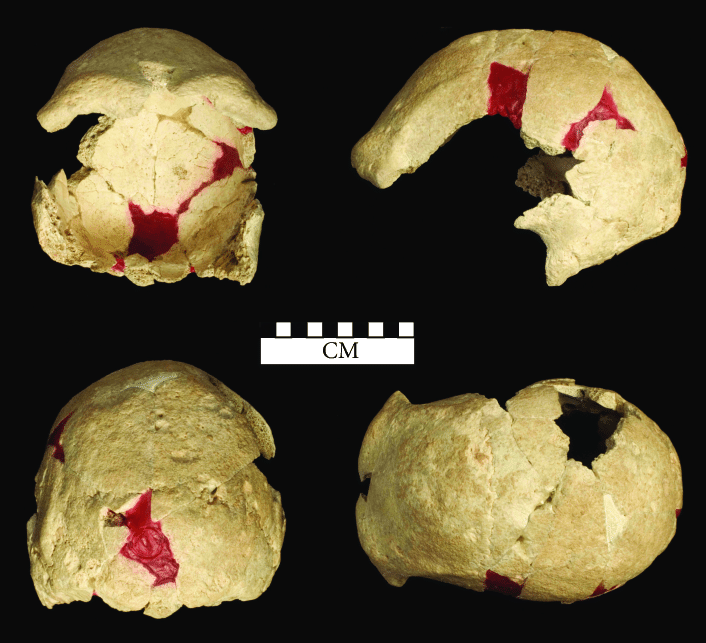
The WLH-50 skullcap, one of the oldest modern human remains of Australia, was used as evidence of Solo Man/modern human interbreeding.

The claim that Aboriginal Australians were descended from Asian H. erectus was expanded upon in the 1960s and 1970s as some of the oldest known (modern) human fossils were being recovered from Australia, primarily under the direction of Australian anthropologist Alan Thorne. He noted some populations were prominently more robust than others, so he suggested Australia was colonised in two waves ("di-hybrid model"): the first wave being highly robust and descending from nearby H. erectus, and the second wave more gracile (less robust) and descending from anatomically modern East Asians (who, in turn, descended from Chinese H. erectus). It was subsequently discovered that some of the more robust specimens are geologically younger than the gracile ones.

By the 1980s, as African species like A. africanus became widely accepted as human ancestors and race became less salient in anthropology, the Out of Africa theory overturned the Out of Asia and multiregional models. The multiregional model was consequently reworked into local populations of archaic humans having interbred and contributed at least some ancestry to modern populations in their respective regions, otherwise known as the assimilation model. Solo Man fits into this by having hybridised with the fully modern ancestors of Aboriginal Australians travelling south through Southeast Asia. The assimilation model was not ubiquitously supported.

In 2006, Australian palaeoanthropologist Steve Webb speculated instead that Solo Man was the first human species to reach Australia, and more robust modern Australian specimens represent hybrid populations.

=== Present ===
The date of 117 to 108 thousand years ago for Solo Man, predating modern human dispersal through Southeast Asia (and eventually into Australia), is at odds with this conclusion. Such an ancient date leaves Solo Man with no living descendants. Similarly, a 2021 genomic study looking at the genomes of over 400 modern humans (of which 200 came from Island Southeast Asia) found no evidence of any "super-archaic" (i. e. H. erectus) interbreeding.

Solo Man has generally been considered to have descended from Java Man (H. e. erectus, typified by the Sangiran/Trinil populations), and the three skulls from Sambungmacan and the skull from Ngawi have been assigned to H. e. soloensis or some intermediary stage between H. e. erectus and H. e. soloensis. It is largely unclear if there was gene flow from the continent. The alternate hypothesis, first proposed by Jacob in 1973, is that the Sangiran/Trinil and Ngandong/Ngawi/Sambungmacan populations were sister groups that evolved parallel to each other. If the alternate is correct, this could warrant species distinction as "H. soloensis", but the definitions of species and subspecies, especially in palaeoanthropology, are poorly drawn.

== Anatomy ==
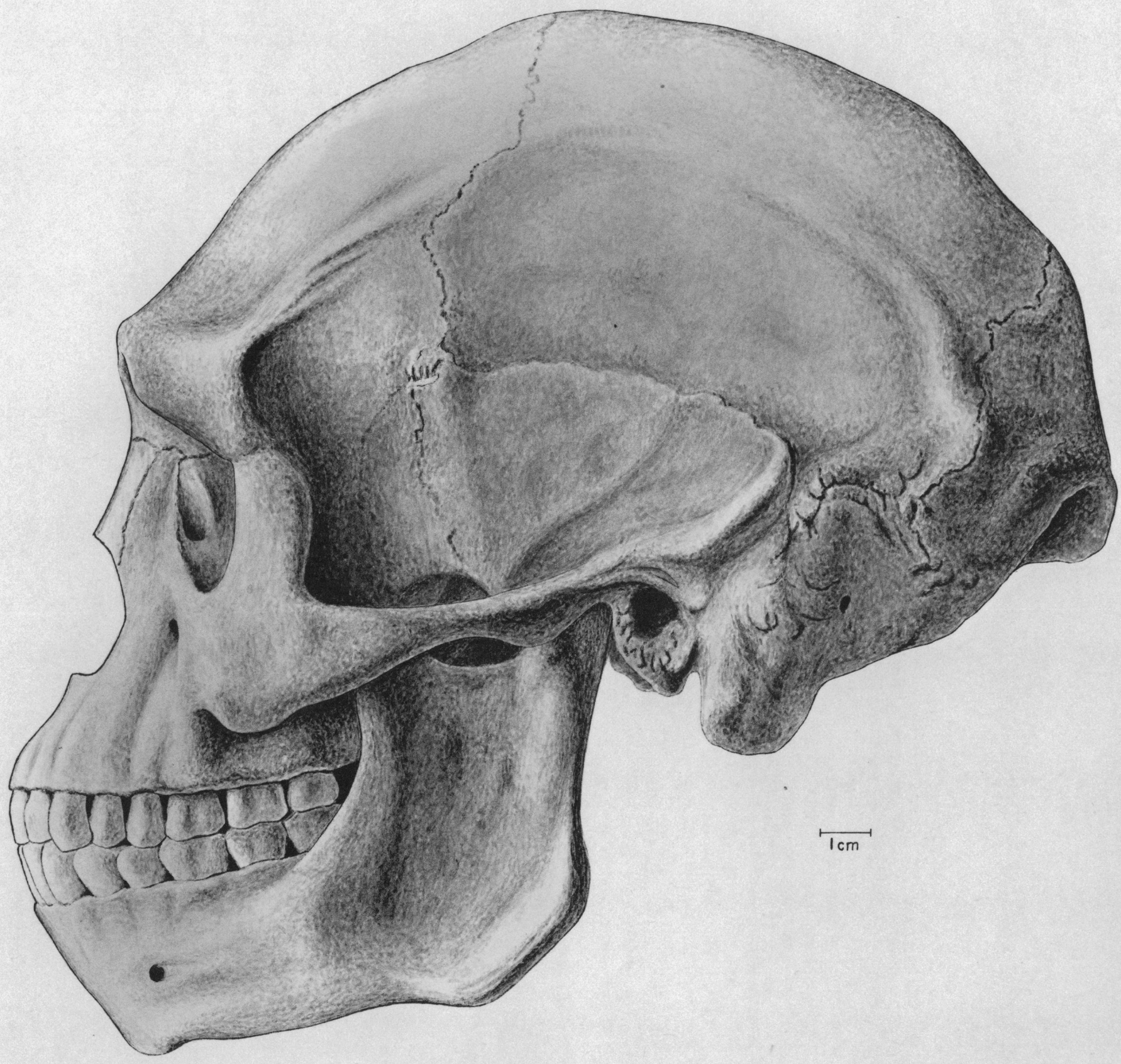
Speculative reconstruction of a complete skull by Franz Weidenreich

The identification as adult or juvenile was based on the closure of the cranial sutures, assuming they closed at a rate similar to modern humans (though they may have closed at earlier ages in H. erectus). Characteristic of H. erectus, the skull is exceedingly thick in Solo Man, ranging from double to triple what would be seen in modern humans. Male and female specimens were distinguished by assuming males were more robust than females, though both males and females are exceptionally robust compared to other Asian H. erectus. The adult skulls average 202 mm × 152 mm (8.0 in × 6.0 in) in length times breadth, and are proportionally similar to that of the Peking Man but have a much larger circumference. Skull V is the longest at 221 mm (8.7 in). For comparison, the dimensions of modern human skulls average 176 mm × 145 mm (6.9 in × 5.7 in) for men and 171 mm × 140 mm (6.7 in × 5.5 in) for women.

The Solo Man remains are characterised by more derived traits than more archaic Javan H. erectus, most notably a larger brain size, an elevated cranial vault, reduced postorbital constriction, and less developed brow ridges. They still closely resemble earlier H. erectus. Like Peking Man, there was a slight sagittal keel running across the midline of the skull. Compared to other Asian H. erectus, the forehead is proportionally low and also has a low angle of inclination. The brow ridges do not form a continuous bar like in Peking Man, but curve downwards at the midpoint, forming a nasal bridge. The brows are quite thick, especially at the lateral ends (nearest the edge of the face). Like Peking Man, the frontal sinuses are confined to between the eyes rather than extending into the brow region. Compared to Neanderthals and modern humans, the area the temporal muscle would have covered is rather flat. The brow ridges merge into markedly thickened cheek bones. The skull is phenozygous, in that the skullcap is proportionally narrow compared to the cheekbones, so that the latter are still visible when looking down at the skull in top-view. The squamous part of the temporal bone is triangular like that of Peking Man, and the infratemporal crest is quite sharp. Like earlier Javan H. erectus, the inferior and superior temporal lines (on the parietal bone) diverge towards the back of the skull.

At the back of the skull, there is a sharp, thick occipital torus (a projecting bar of bone) which marks a clear separation between the occipital and nuchal planes. The occipital torus projects the most at the part corresponding to the external occipital protuberance in modern humans. The base of the temporal bone is consistent with Java Man and Peking Man rather than Neanderthals and modern humans. Unlike Neanderthals and modern humans, there is a defined bony pyramid structure near the root of the pterygoid bone. The mastoid part of the temporal bone at the base of the skull notably juts out. The occipital condyles (which connect the skull to the spine) are proportionally small compared to the foramen magnum (where the spinal cord passes into the skull). Large, irregular bony projections lie directly behind the occipital condyles.

The brain volumes of the six Ngandong specimens for which the metric is calculable range from 1,013 to 1,251 cc (61.8 to 76.3 cu in). The Ngawi I skull measures 1,000 cc (61 cu in); and the three Sambungmacan skulls 1,035, 917 and 1,006 cc (63.2, 56.0 and 61.4 cu in). This makes for an average of over 1,000 cc (61 cu in). Overall, Asian H. erectus are big-brained, averaging roughly 1,000 cc (61 cu in). For comparison, a 1955 survey of 63 Aboriginal Australians reported a brain volume range of 943 to 1,399 cc (57.5 to 85.4 cu in); that is, Asian H. erectus brain volume fits within the modern human range of variation. The base of the braincase, and thus the brain, seems to have been flat rather than curved. The sella turcica at the base of the skull, near the pituitary gland, is much larger than that of modern humans, which Weidenreich in 1951 cautiously attributed to an enlarged gland which caused the extraordinary thickening of the bones.

Of the two known tibiae, Tibia A is much more robust than Tibia B and is consistent overall with Neanderthal tibiae. Like other H. erectus, the tibiae are thick and heavy. Based on the reconstructed length of 380 mm (15 in), Tibia B may have belonged to a 158 cm (5 ft 2 in) tall, 51 kg (112 lb) individual. Tibia A is assumed to have belonged to a larger individual. Asian H. erectus, for which height estimates are taken (a rather small sample size), typically range from 150–160 cm (4 ft 11 in – 5 ft 3 in), with Indonesian H. erectus in tropical environments typically scoring on the higher end, and continental specimens in colder latitudes on the lower end. The single pelvic fragment from Ngandong has not yet been described formally.

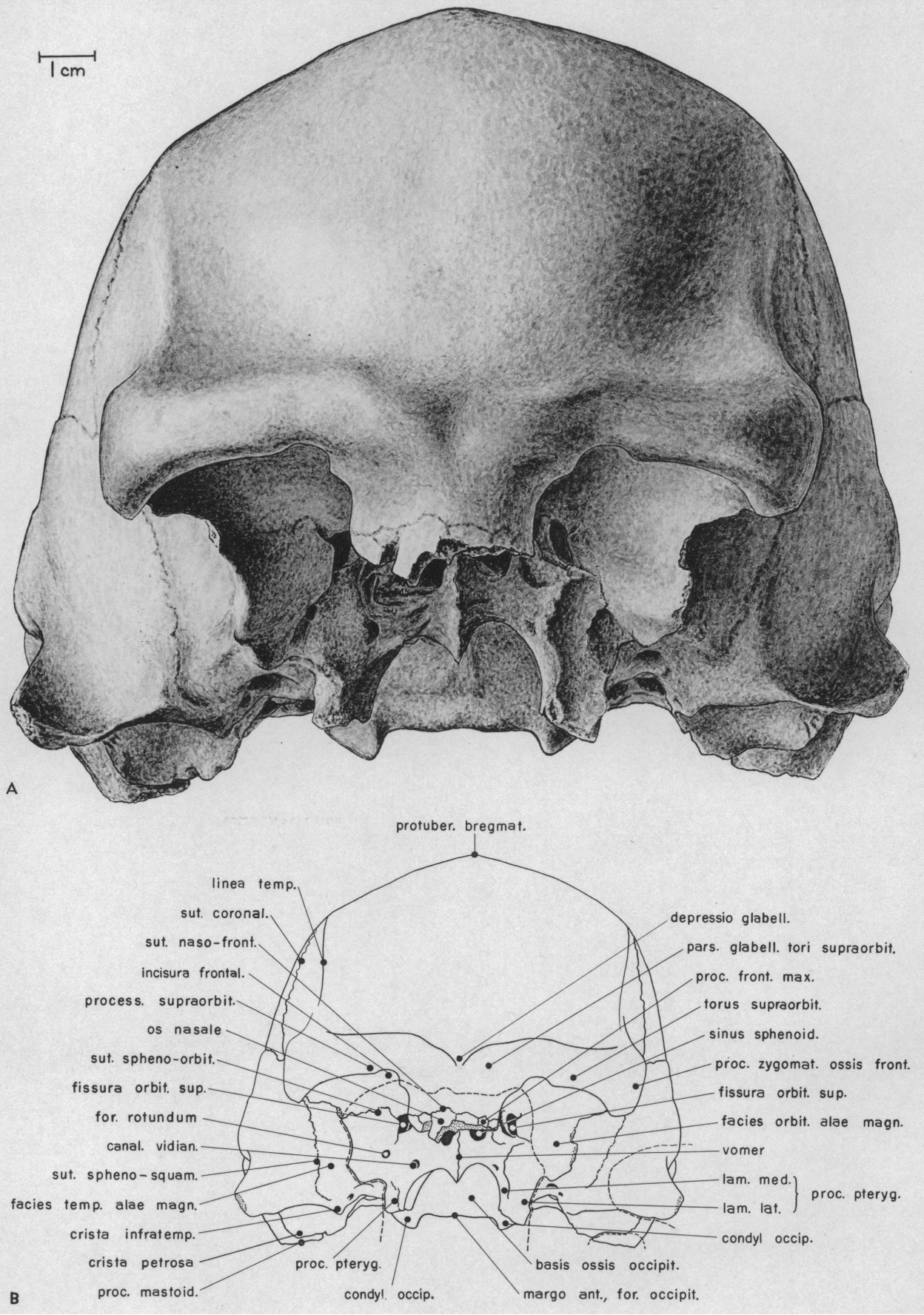
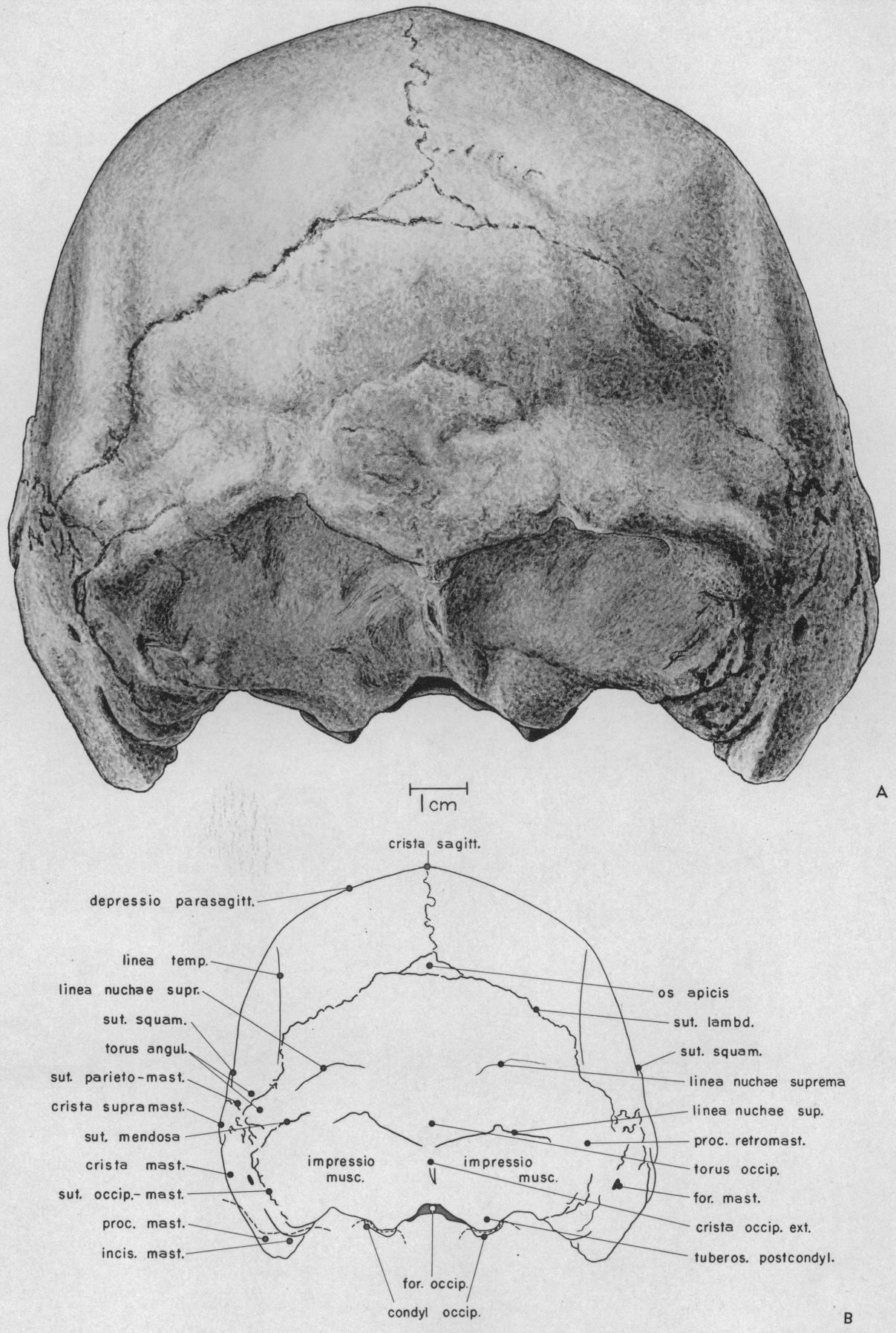
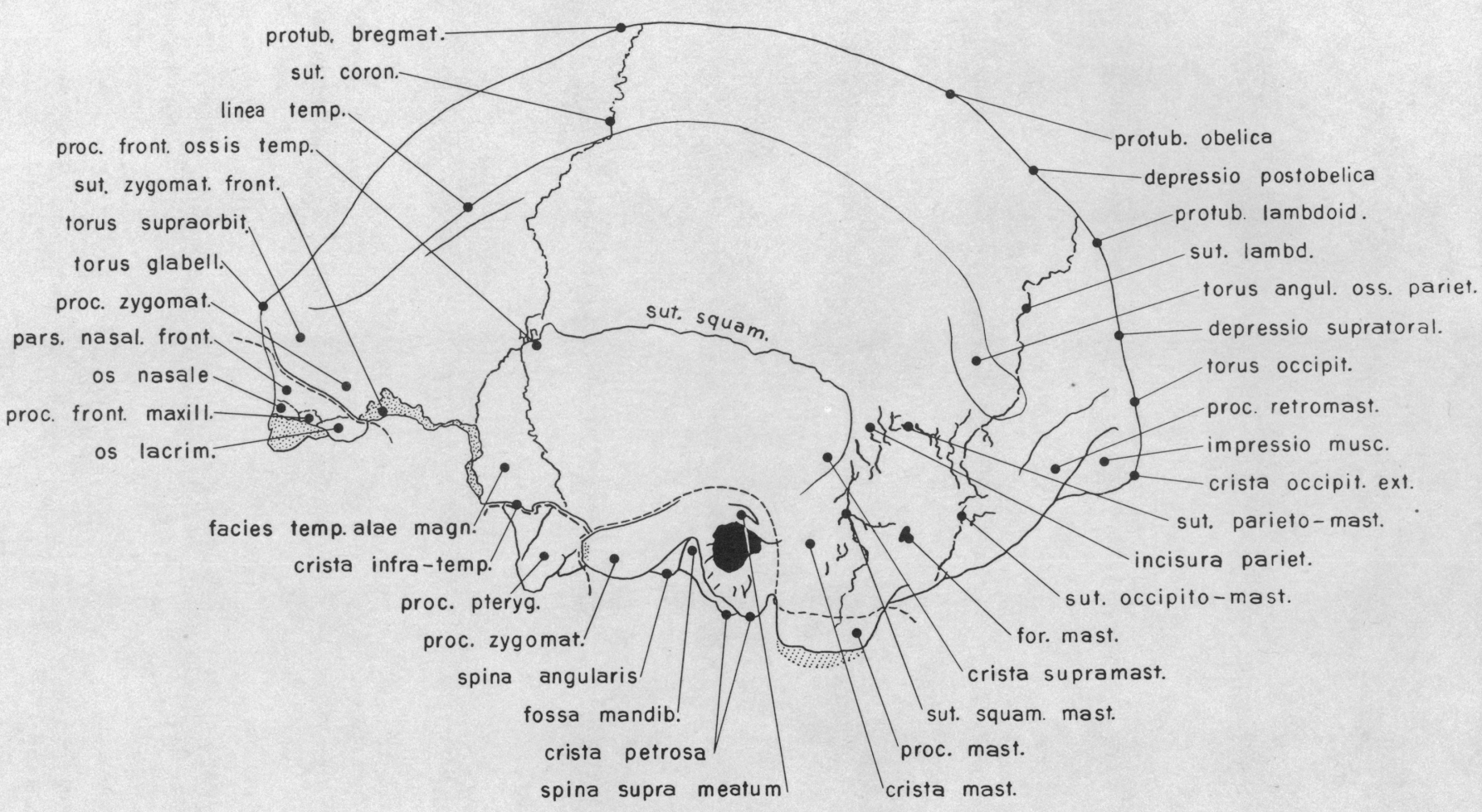
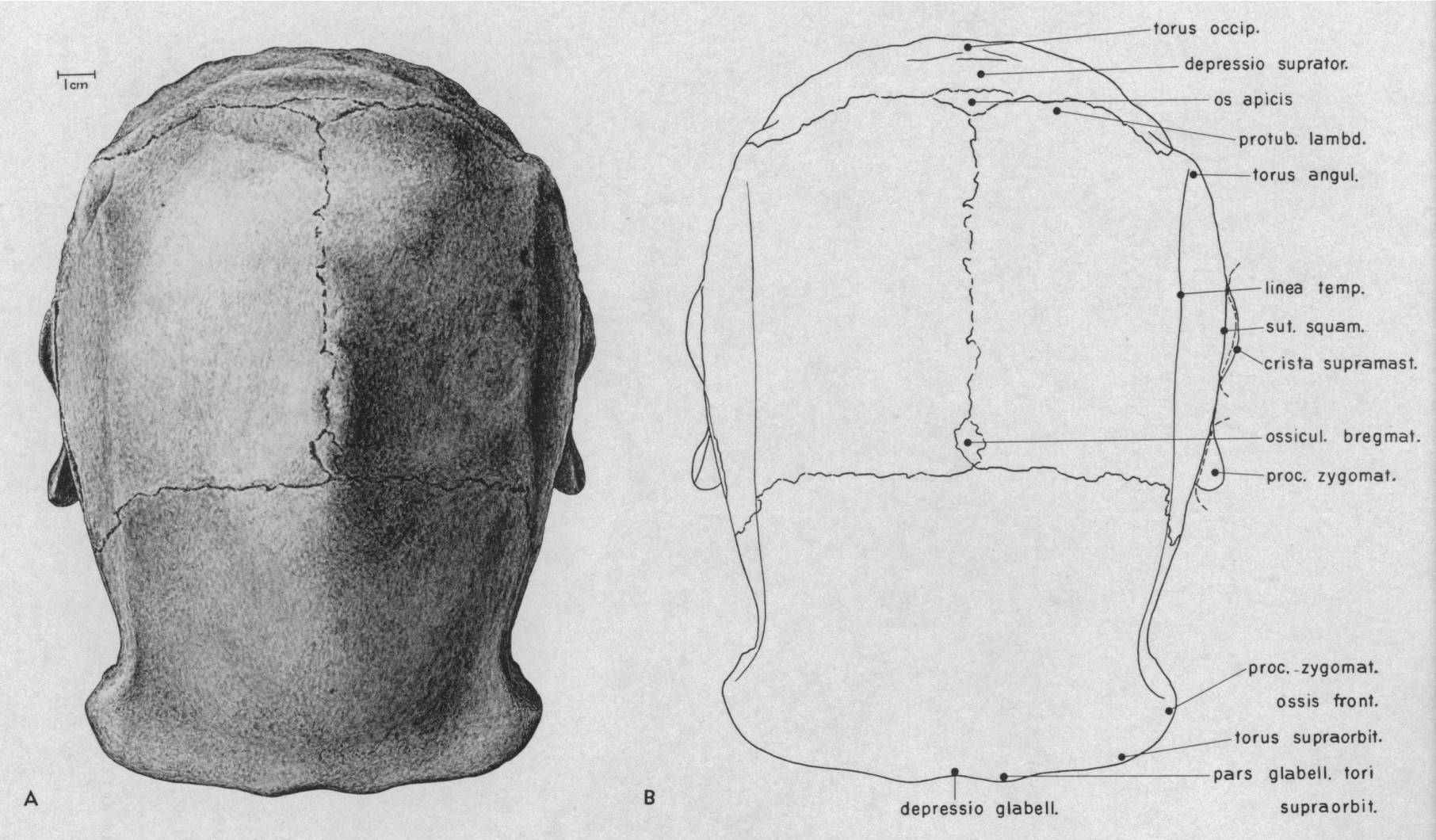
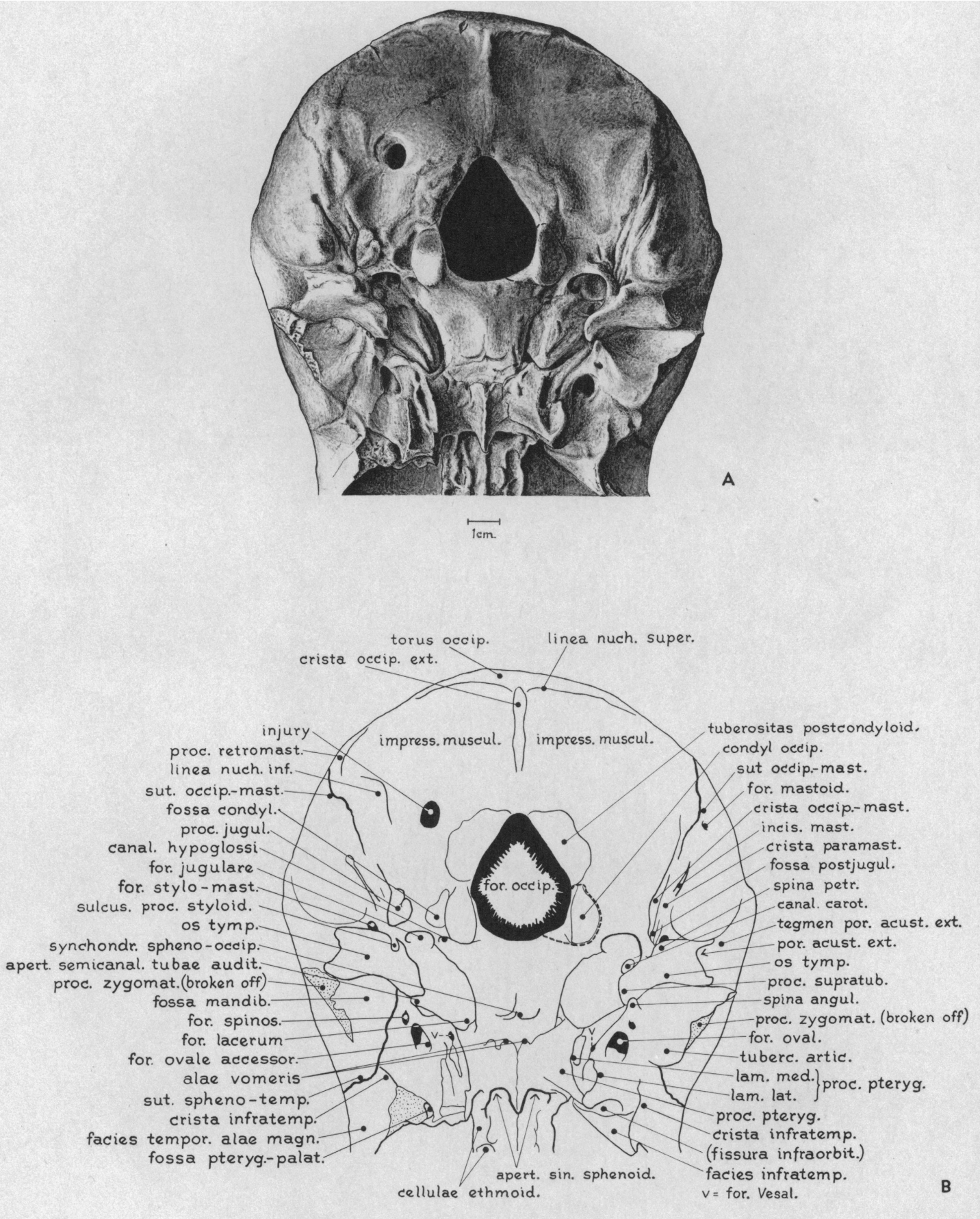
Views and notes of (from left to right) Skull XI from the front, back, left side, and top, and Skull VI from the underside, Franz Weidenreich, 1951

== Culture ==
=== Palaeohabitat ===
At the species level, the Ngandong fauna is similar overall to the older Kedung Brubus fauna roughly 800 to 700 thousand years ago, a time of mass immigration of large mammal species to Java, including Asian elephants and Stegodon. Other Ngandong fauna include the tiger Panthera tigris soloensis, Malayan tapir, the hippo Hexaprotodon, sambar deer, water buffalo, the cow Bos palaesondaicus, pigs, and crab-eating macaque. These are consistent with an open woodland environment. The presence of the common crane in the nearby contemporaneous Watualang site could indicate much cooler conditions than today. The driest conditions probably corresponded to the glacial maximum roughly 135,000 years ago, exposing the Sunda shelf and connecting the major Indonesian islands to the continent. By 125,000 years ago, the climate became much wetter, making Java an island, and allowing for the expansion of tropical rainforests. This caused the succession of the Ngandong fauna by the Punung fauna, which represents the modern day animal assemblage of Java, though more typical Punung fauna — namely orangutans and gibbons — probably could not penetrate the island until it was reconnected to the continent after 80,000 years ago. H. erectus, a specialist in woodland and savannah biomes, likely went extinct with the loss of the last open-habitat refugia.

H. e. soloensis was the last population of a long occupation history of the island of Java by H. erectus, beginning 1.51 to 0.93 million years ago at the Sangiran site, continuing 540 to 430 thousand years ago at the Trinil site, and finally 117 to 108 thousand years ago at Ngandong. If the date is correct for Solo Man, then they would represent a terminal population of H. erectus which sheltered in the last open-habitat refuges of East Asia before the rainforest takeover. Before the immigration of modern humans, Late Pleistocene Southeast Asia was also home to H. floresiensis endemic to the island of Flores, Indonesia, and H. luzonensis endemic to the island of Luzon, the Philippines. Genetic analysis of present-day Southeast Asian populations indicates the widespread dispersal of the Denisovans (a species currently recognisable only by their genetic signature) across Southeast Asia, whereupon they interbred with immigrating modern humans 45.7 and 29.8 thousand years ago. A 2021 genomic study indicates that, aside from the Denisovans, modern humans never interbred with any of these endemic human species, unless the offspring were unviable or the hybrid lineages have since died out.

Judging by the sheer number of specimens deposited at Ngandong at the same time, there may have been a sizeable population of H. e soloensis before the volcanic eruption which resulted in their interment, but population is difficult to approximate with certainty. The Ngandong site was some distance away from the northern coast of the island, but it is unclear where the southern shoreline and the mouth of the Solo River would have been.

=== Technology ===
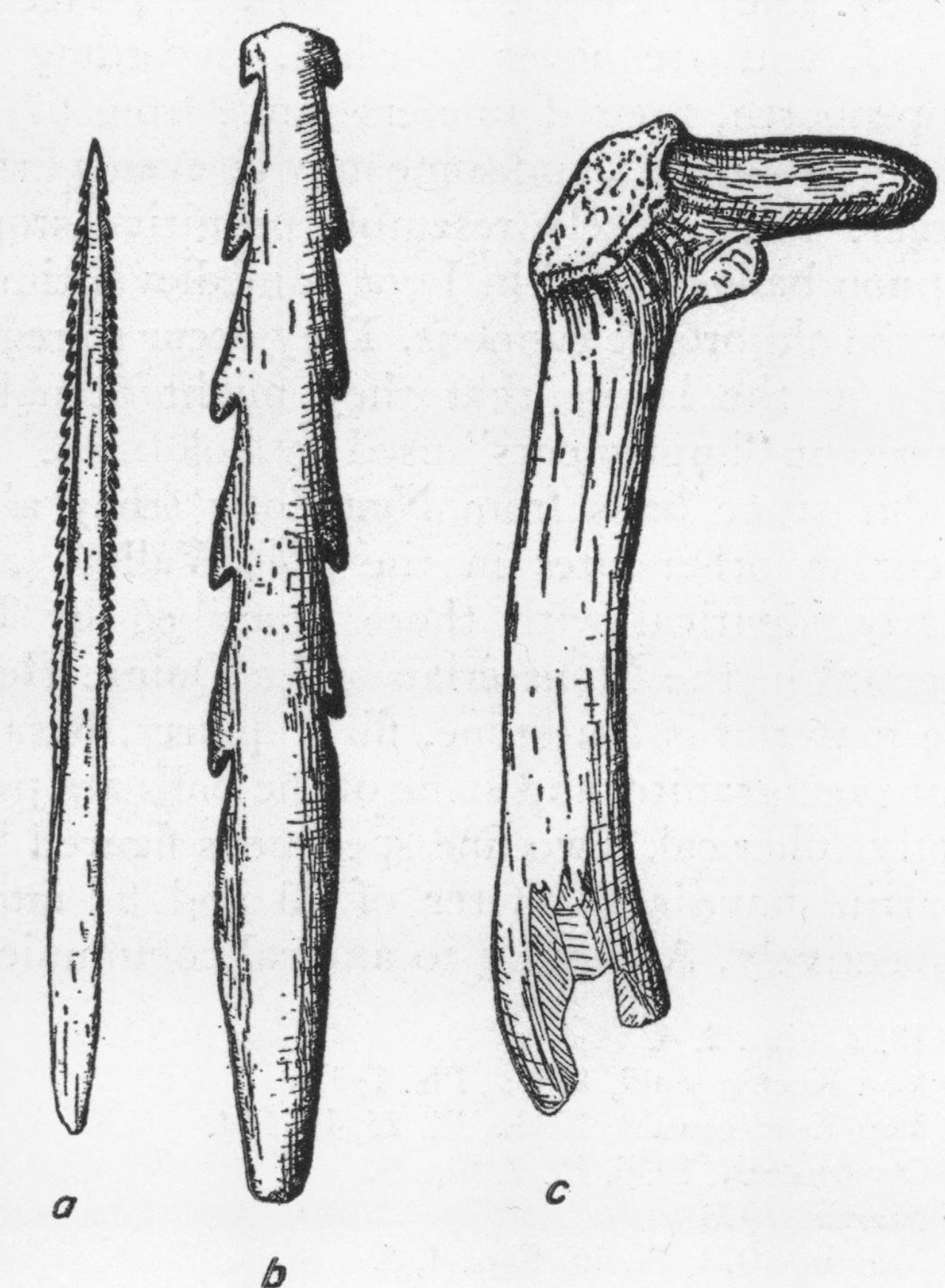
Supposed Solo Man tools: a) stingray barb, b) bone harpoon or spearhead, c) deer antler fragment

In 1936, while studying photos taken by Dutch archaeologist Pieter Vincent van Stein Callenfels, Oppenoorth made note of several broken animal bone remains, most notably damage to a large tiger skull and some deer antlers, which he considered evidence of bone technology. He suggested some deer antlers had a carved bird skull hafted onto the end to be used as axes. In 1951, Weidenreich voiced his scepticism—as the bones were invariably damaged by the river, and perhaps crocodiles and other natural processes—arguing instead that none of the bones reliably show any evidence of human modification. Oppenoorth further suggested a long piece of bone carved with an undulating pattern on both sides was used as a harpoon, similar to harpoons manufactured in the Magdalenian of Europe, but Weidenreich interpreted it as a spearhead. Weidenreich made note of anomalous inland stingray stingers at Ngandong, which he supposed were collected by Solo Man for use as daggers or arrowheads, similar to some recent South Pacific peoples. It is unclear if this apparent bone technology can be associated with Solo Man or later modern human activity, though the Trinil H. e. erectus population seems to have worked with such material, manufacturing scrapers from Pseudodon shells and possibly opening them up with shark teeth.

Oppenoorth also identified a perfectly round andesite stone ball from Ngandong, a common occurrence in the Solo Valley, ranging in diameter from 67 to 92 mm (2.6 to 3.6 in). As well, similar balls have been identified in contemporaneous and younger European Mousterian and African Middle Stone Age sites, as ancient as African Acheulean sites (notably Olorgesailie, Kenya). On Java, they have been found at Watualang (contemporaneous with Ngandong) and Sangiran. Traditionally, these have been interpreted as bolas (tied together in twos or threes and flung as a hunting weapon), but also individually thrown projectiles, club heads, or plant-processing or bone-breaking tools. In 1993, American archaeologists Kathy Schick and Nicholas Toth demonstrated the spherical shape could be reproduced simply if the stone is used as a hammer for an extended period.

In 1938, von Koenigswald returned to the Ngandong site along with archaeologists Helmut de Terra, Hallam L. Movius and Pierre Teilhard de Chardin to collect lithic cores and flakes (i.e. stone tools). Because of wear caused by the river, it is difficult to identify with confidence that some of these rocks are actual tools. They are small and simple, usually smaller than 5 cm (2 in) and made most commonly of chalcedony (but also chert and jasper) washed up by the river. A few volcanic rocks and wood fragments seem to have been modified into heavy duty chopping tools. In 1973, the nearby Sambungmacan site yielded a unifacial chopper (as well as a flake) made of andesite. Because of how few tools have been recovered, it is impossible to categorise Solo Man into any distinct industry. Like many other Southeast Asian sites predating modern humans, the Ngandong site lacks sophisticated choppers, hand axes, or any other complex chopping tool characteristic of the Acheulean of Western Eurasian and African sites. In 1948, Movius suggested this was because of a great technological divide between western and eastern H. erectus (the "Movius Line") caused by a major difference in habitat (open area vs. tropical rainforest), as the chopping tools are generally interpreted as evidence of big game hunting, which he believed was only possible when humans spread out onto open plains.

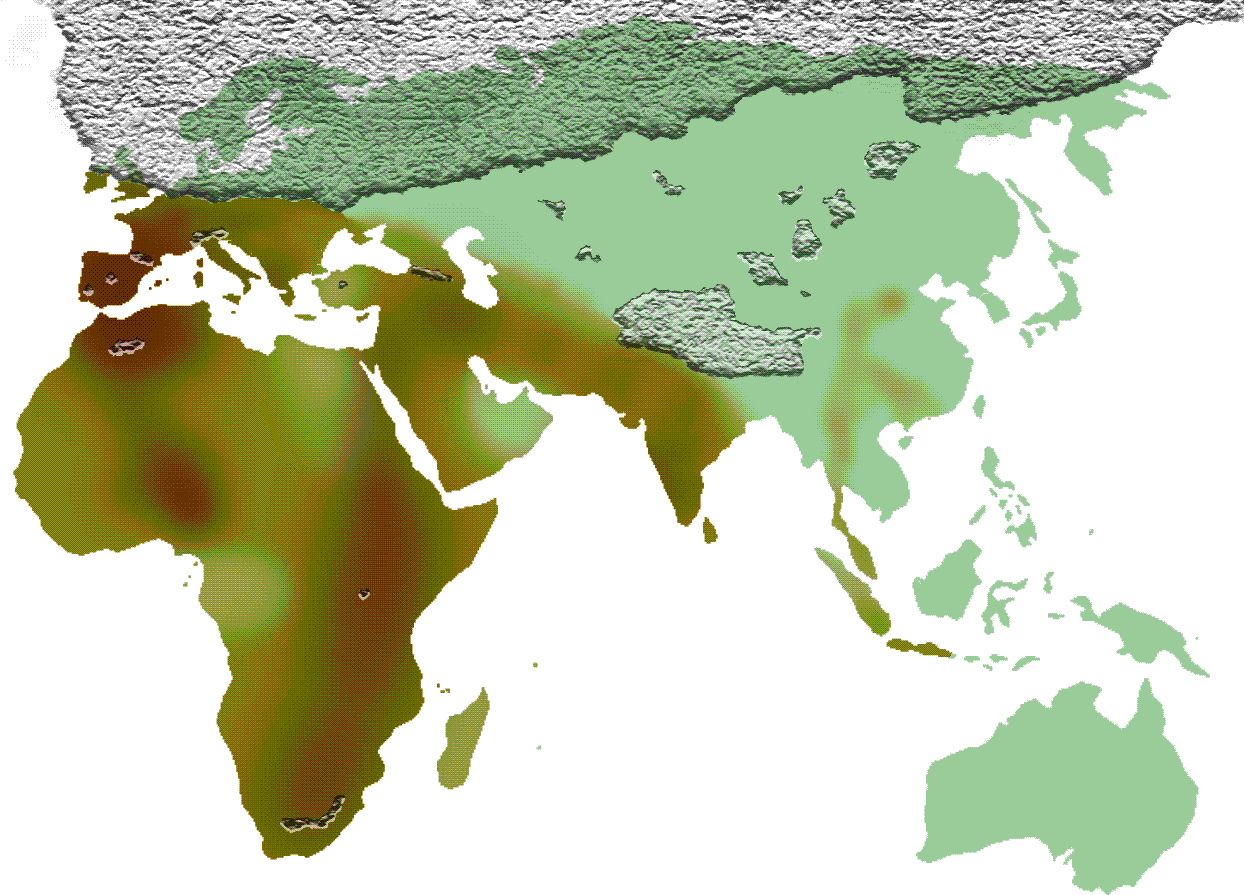
General distribution of Middle Pleistocene handaxes according to the archaeological record Areas with handaxes Areas without handaxes

Though a strict "Movius Line" is not well supported anymore with the discovery of some hand axe technology in Middle Pleistocene East Asia, handaxes are still conspicuously rare and crude in East Asia compared to western contemporaries. This has been explained as: the Acheulean emerged in Africa after human dispersal through East Asia (but this would require that the two populations remained separated for nearly two million years); East Asia had poorer quality raw materials, namely quartz and quartzite (but some Chinese localities produced handaxes from these materials and East Asia is not completely void of higher-quality minerals); East Asian H. erectus used biodegradable bamboo instead of stone for chopping tools (but this is difficult to test); or East Asia had a lower population density, leaving few tools behind in general (though demography is difficult to approximate in the fossil record).

=== Possible cannibalism ===
In 1951, Weidenreich and von Koenigswald made note of major injuries in Skulls IV and VI, which they believed were caused by a cutting instrument and a blunt instrument, respectively. They bear evidence of inflammation and healing, so the individuals probably survived the altercation. Weidenreich and von Koenigswald noted that only the skullcaps were found, lacking even the teeth, which is highly unusual. So, they interpreted at least Skulls IV and VI as victims of an "unsuccessful assault", and the other skulls where the base was broken out "the result of more successful attempts to slay the victims," presuming this was done by other humans to access and consume the brain. They were unsure if this was done by a neighbouring H. e. soloensis tribe, or "by more advanced human beings who would have given evidence of their 'superior' culture by slaying their more primitive fellowsman". The latter scenario had already been proposed for the Peking Man (which has similarly conspicuous pathology) by French palaeontologist Marcellin Boule in 1937. Nonetheless, Weidenreich and von Koenigswald conceded that some of the injuries could have been related to the volcanic eruption instead. Von Koenigswald suggested only skullcaps exist because Solo Man was modifying skulls into skull cups, but Weidenreich was sceptical of this as the jagged rims of especially Skulls I, V, and X are not well suited for this purpose.

Cannibalism and ritual headhunting have also been proposed for the Trinil, Sangiran, and Modjokerto sites (all in Java) based on the conspicuous lack of any remains other than the skullcap. This had been reinforced by the historic practice of headhunting and cannibalism in some modern Indonesian, Australian, and Polynesian groups, which at the time were believed to have descended from these H. erectus populations. In 1972, Jacob alternatively suggested that because the base of the skull is weaker than the skullcap, and since the remains had been transported through a river with large stone and boulders, this was a purely natural phenomenon. As for the lack of the rest of the skeleton, if tiger predation was a factor, tigers usually only leave the head since it has the least amount of meat on it. Further, the Ngandong material, especially Skulls I and IX, were damaged during excavation, cleaning, and preparation.

== See also ==
- Archaic humans in Southeast Asia
- Gigantopithecus
- Meganthropus
- Peopling of Southeast Asia
