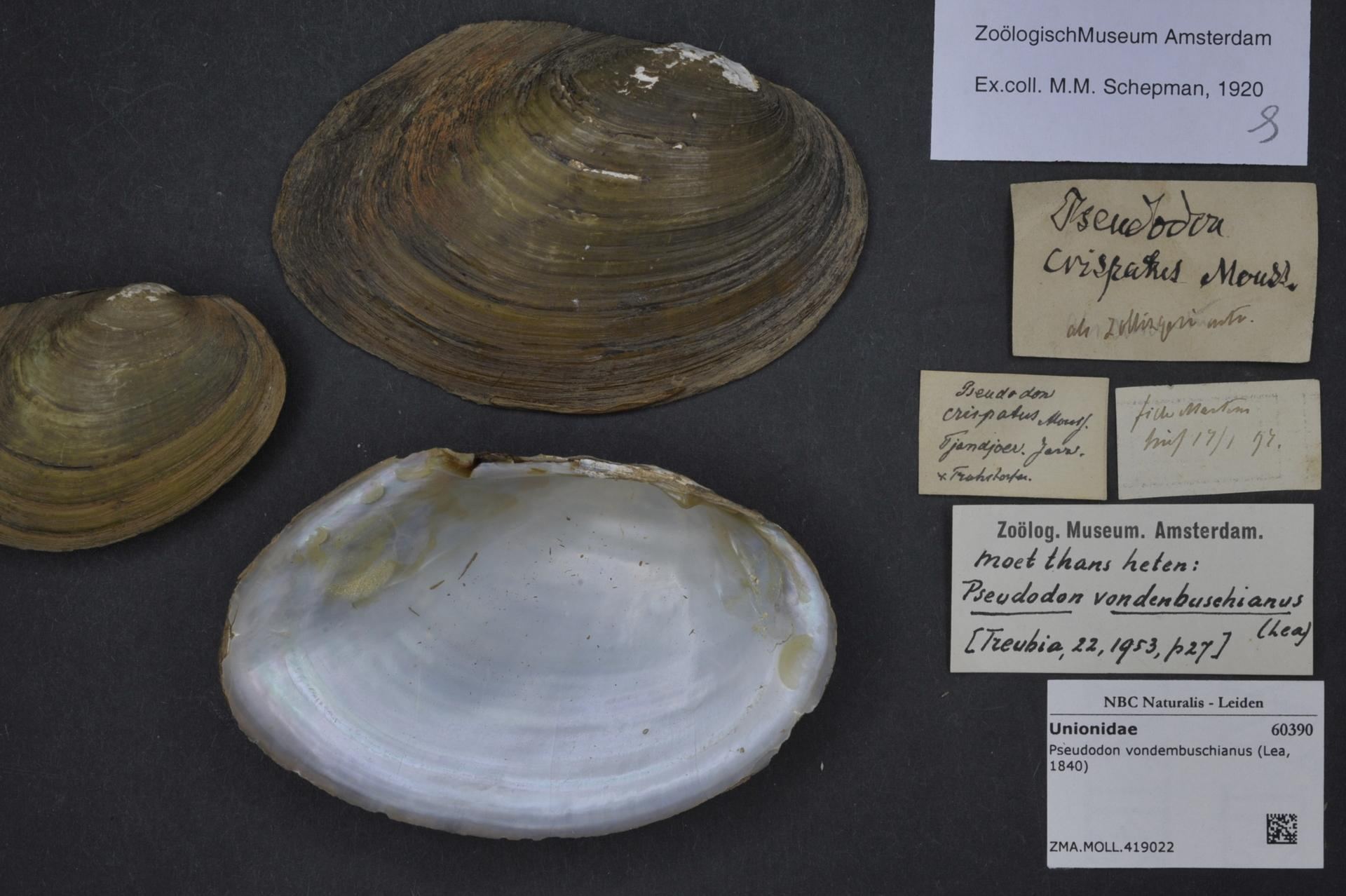
- Both valves of an individual mussel; Specimen, Naturalis

Conservation status
- Least Concern (IUCN 3.1)

Scientific classification
- Kingdom: Animalia
- Phylum: Mollusca
- Class: Bivalvia
- Order: Unionida
- Family: Unionidae
- Genus: Pseudodon
- Species: P. vondembuschianus

Binomial name
- Pseudodon vondembuschianus (I. Lea, 1840)

Synonyms
- List: Margaritana vondembuschiana I. Lea, 1840 Basionym; Alasmodonta vondembuschiana (I. Lea, 1840); Monodontina vondembuschiana (I. Lea, 1840); Alasmodonta zollingeri f. angulosa Mousson, 1849; Pseudodon zollingeri (Mousson, 1849); Monodontina buschiana Conrad, 1853; Monocondylaea planulata I. Lea, 1859; Unio vonbuschea G. B. Sowerby II, 1866; Bineurus hageni (Strubell, 1897); Pseudodon hageni (Strubell, 1897)

= Pseudodon vondembuschianus =

Species of freshwater mussel

Pseudodon vondembuschianus is a species of freshwater mussel from the family Unionidae. The species is endemic to Southeast Asia, present in both Mainland and Maritime nations of the region.

== Nomenclature ==
In general, freshwater mussels are called kupang or kijing in Malay. Kijing is also used as the Indonesian name.

Pseudodon vondembuschianus was previously assigned to other genera, including Margaritana, Alasmodonta [sic], Monodontina, Monocondylaea, Unio, and Bineurus.

== Description ==
Pseudodon vondembuschianus was originally described in 1840 by Isaac Lea from a specimen collected in Java. (Note: Margaritana Vondenbuschiana. Testâ obovatâ, compressâ, inæquilaterali; valvulis tenuibus; natibus subprominentibus; epidermide luteo-fuscâ; dentibus cardinalibus parvis, tuberculatis; margaritâ albâ et iridescente. Hab. Java.—G. Von den Busch, M.D.)

The mussel's shell is variable in shape, ranging from "fairly compressed" to "moderately inflated", though tending to be "elongately elliptical". The shell is "winged", though this may be limited to juveniles. The umbo's sculpture zigzags, and there is a long and thin pseudocardinal tooth on each valve, close to the hinge.

The mussels from Singapore grow up to be 87 millimetres (3.4 in) long, 53 millimetres (2.1 in) wide, and 26.5 millimetres (1.04 in) in height. Like many other unionids, P. vondembuschianus is dark brown in color. This species is difficult to distinguish from other Pseudodon spp. if solely relying on morphology.

There are 6 subspecies:

- Pseudodon vondembuschianus laosicus (Bolotov et al., 2020) Mekong River Basin, Laos
- Pseudodon vondembuschianus tapienicus (Konopleva et al., 2022) Southern Thailand
- Pseudodon vondembuschianus thasaenicus (Konopleva et al., 2022) Southern Thailand
- †Pseudodon vondembuschianus trinilensis (E. Dubois, 1908) Ngawi Regency
- †Pseudodon vondembuschianus vandervlerki Oostingh, 1935 Brebes Regency
- Pseudodon vondembuschianus vondembuschianus (I. Lea, 1840) (Nominate) Java, Malaysia, Sumatra

Segment of time-calibrated phylogeny of the tribe Pseudodontini based on the complete set of mitochondrial and nuclear sequences (five partitions: three codons of COI + 16S rRNA + 28S rRNA);

- Pseudodontina
  - Namkongnaia
  - Pseudodon
    - - - Pseudodon inoscularis
        - Pseudodon lenyanensis
      - - Pseudodon vagulus
        - Pseudodon cambodjensis
    - - Pseudodon vondembuschianus vondembuschianus
      - - Pseudodon mekongi
        - - Pseudodon vondembuschianus tapienicus
          - - Pseudodon vondembuschianus thasaenicus
            - Pseudodon vondembuschianus laosicus

== Distribution ==
Pseudodon vondembuschianus inhabits the rivers, forest streams, wetlands, and lakes of Southeast Asia, though some sources suggest the species is a specialist of rivers and streams (habitats with flowing instead of stagnant water), and it has also been found in flowing irrigation channels. It is widespread, being native to Cambodia, Java, Sumatra, Laos, Peninsular Malaysia, Thailand, and southern Vietnam, and may also be present in Kalimantan, Sabah, and Sarawak (Borneo). A Singaporean population is suspected to originate from an introduction event that occurred between 1973 and 1989; the population was discovered on 24 August 1989, from the Sungai Seleter reservoir, and is thought to have "hitchhiked" on introduced ornamental fish as glochidia. However, further study revealed that this population is in fact a tropical-adapted lineage of Sinanodonta woodiana, which is more widespread due to its invasiveness.

== Biology ==
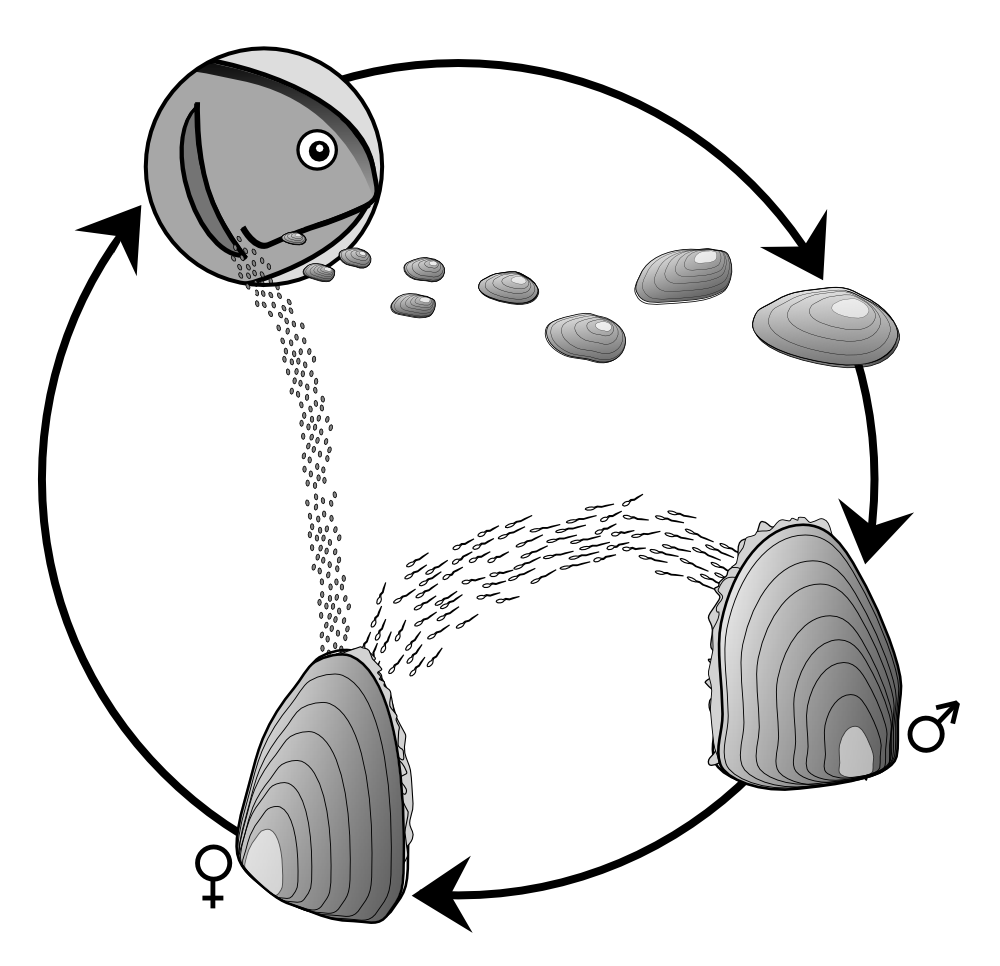
Lifecycle of Margaritifera margaritifera, with parasitic glochidia. It is thought that P. vondembuschianus undertakes a similar process to reproduce.

The details of this species' biology, such as growth, age of maturity, hosts, specific distribution, population trends, and threats, are unknown due to lack of research of this species and of Unionids in general.

Like other unionids, P. vondembuschianus parasitizes fish to ensure dispersal. The host species (and whether there are multiple) is unknown, though the widespread distribution of this mussel suggests equally widespread host species.

In some waterways, the density of this species may reach 50 individual mussels/1 square metre (11 sq ft). These mussels are often associated with Contradens contradens, another unionid mussel species. Rhodeus laoensis, a bitterling, is thought to deposit its eggs within this species' shell (using an elongate ovipositor, as other bitterling species do), and in turn it is thought that this mussel's glochidia are hosted by the bitterling.

== Relation to humans ==
Pseudodon vondembuschianus, like other freshwater bivalves, is eaten by humans. Its shells are also used in hand-crafted jewelry.

=== Palaeontology/archaeology ===
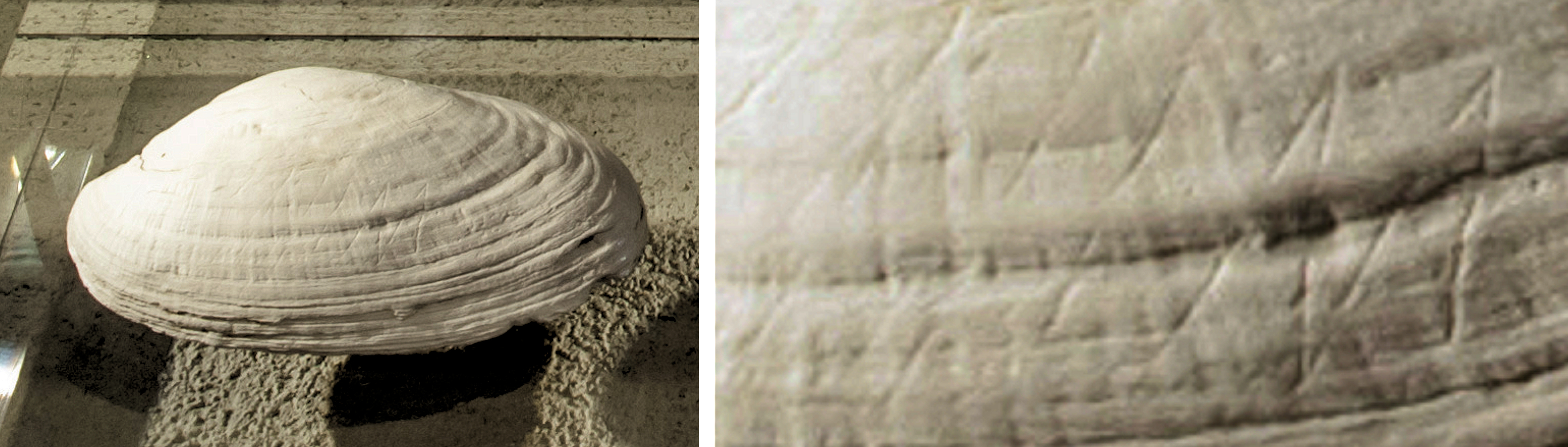
Pseudodon shell DUB1006-fL, with details of the engraving

Specimen DUB1006-fL is a fossilized shell of Pseudodon vondembuschianus trinilensis that was uncovered in Trinil, Java, Indonesia. The shell has a zigzag engraving on its surface thought to be carved by a Homo erectus individual. It was carved between 540,000 and 430,000 years before present, and is the oldest known anthropogenic carving in the world. There is an ongoing controversy on whether or not the carving can qualify as art (which would make it the oldest piece of art in the world). Some commentators call it a "doodle" or "decorative marks", while others suggest that the carving is explicitly art.
