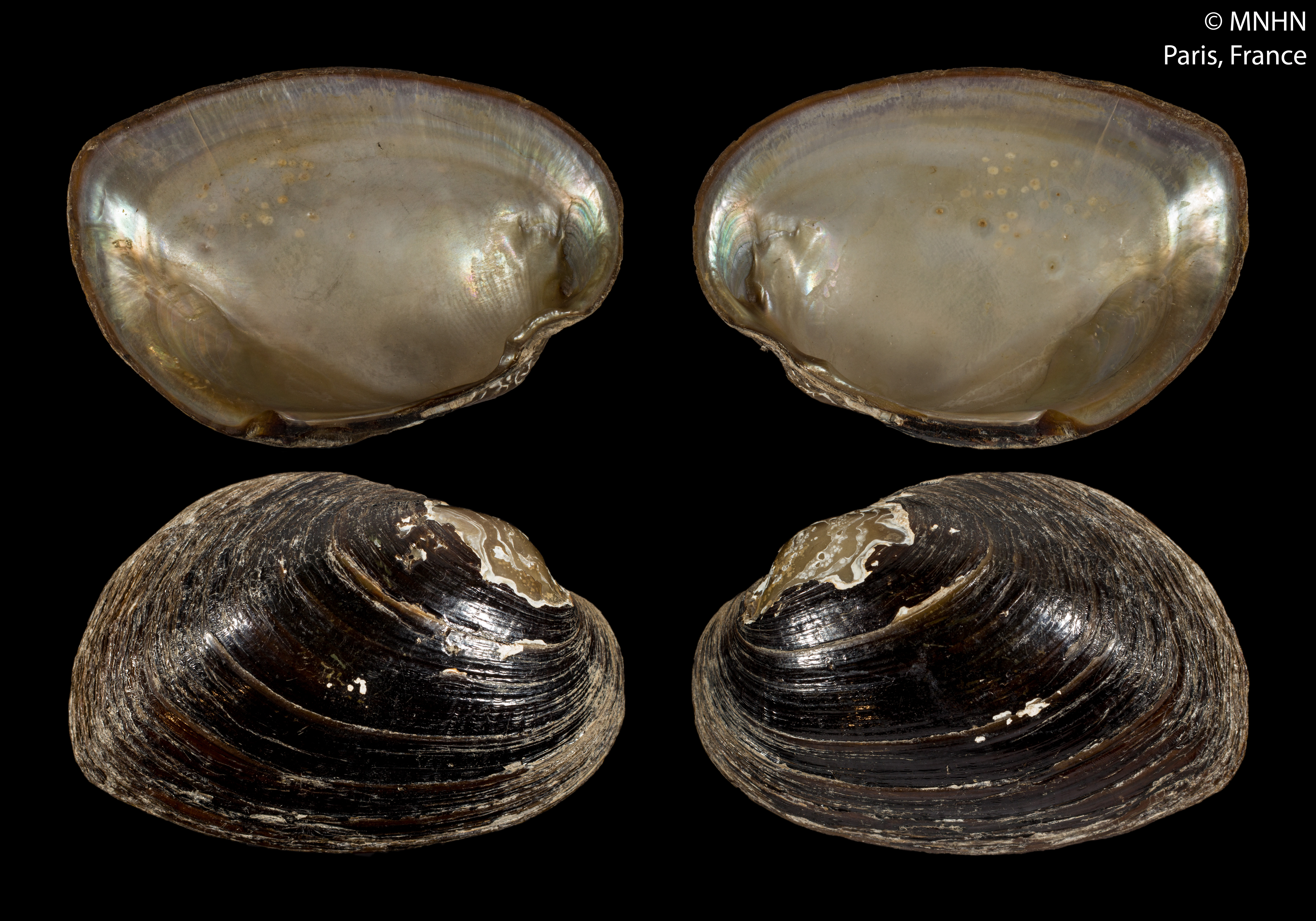
- Shell of Pseudodon inoscularis

Scientific classification
- Kingdom: Animalia
- Phylum: Mollusca
- Class: Bivalvia
- Order: Unionida
- Family: Unionidae
- Genus: Pseudodon; Gould, 1844

Type species
- Pseudodon inoscularis

= Pseudodon =

Pseudodon Temporal range: Pleistocene–Holocene

Genus of bivalves

Pseudodon is a genus of bivalvia from the Unionidae family of freshwater mussels native to East and Southeast Asia. There are 12 recognized species. Their life cycle is thought to be akin to other Unionids, parasitizing fish in order to disperse. They are locally consumed and provide raw materials for jewelry, cosmetics, and medicine.

== Description ==
The taxon was described by John Gould from his findings at the Salween River Basin in British Burma, initially described as a subgenus of Anodon. Gould included two species in the taxon, the type species Anodon inoscularis and Anodon salweniana.

The shell of Pseudodon is rather thick and shaped like an elongated oval, with a slightly convex crown on the upper valve shifted toward the rear. The surface, although most often smooth, is crossed by deep transverse furrows in some species. The hinge teeth are high, thick, and rounded at the apices.

== Range ==
The distribution of the genus is limited to East and Southeast Asia, mainly the Yangtze River Basin and Myanmar. The species Pseudodon inoscularis is also found in Thailand, Cambodia, and southern Vietnam, while the species Pseudodon resupinatus is endemic to northern Vietnam, and the species Pseudodon vondembuschianus is found in Indonesia and Indochina.

== Relation to humans ==
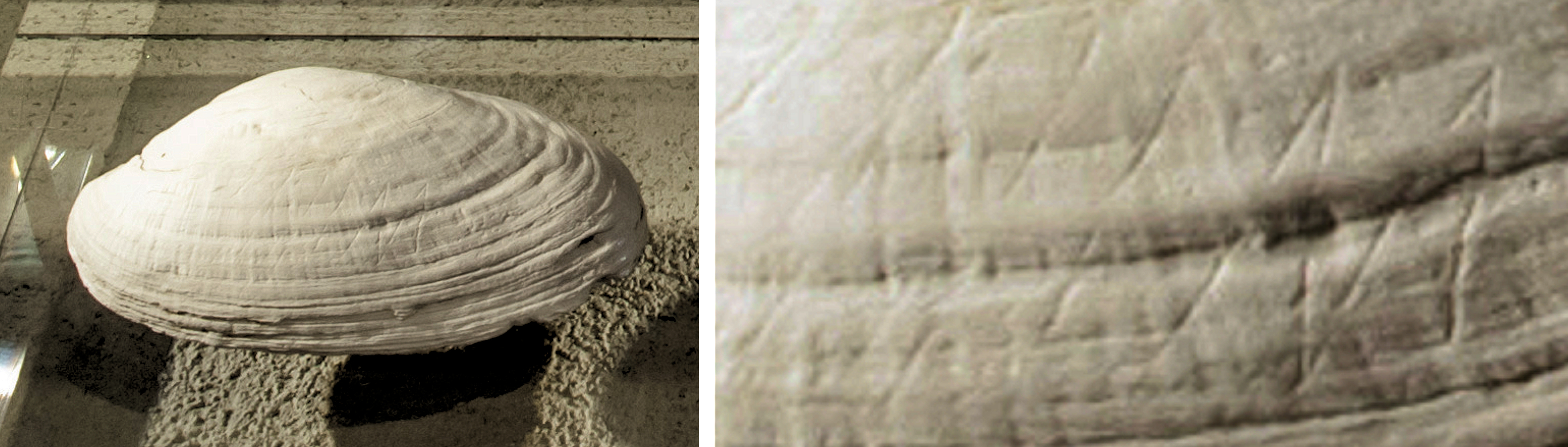
Pseudodon shell DUB1006-fL, with details of the engraving.

Pseudodon shell DUB1006-fL is a fossilized shell of Pseudodon vondembuschianus trinilensis that was found in Trinil, Java, Indonesia. The shell has a zigzag pattern engraved on it by a Homo erectus. It was carved between 540,000 and 430,000 years before present, and is the oldest known anthropogenic carving in the world. There is an ongoing controversy on whether or not the carving can qualify as art (which would make it the oldest piece of art in the world). Some commentators call it a "doodle" or "decorative marks", while others suggest that the carving is explicitly art.

== Currently recognized species ==
WoRMS recognizes 12 species of Pseudodon;

- †Pseudodon astensis (Sacco, 1886)
- Pseudodon cambodjensis (Petit de la Saussaye, 1865)
- Pseudodon inoscularis (A. Gould, 1844)
- Pseudodon lenyanensis (Bolotov et al., 2020)
- Pseudodon mekongi (Bolotov et al., 2020)
- Pseudodon nankingensis (Heude, 1874)
- Pseudodon nicobaricus (Mörch, 1872)
- †Pseudodon pingi Otuka, 1942
- Pseudodon secundus Heude, 1877
- Pseudodon vagulus (P. Fischer, 1891)
- Pseudodon vondembuschianus (I. Lea, 1840)
- Pseudodon walpolei (Hanley, 1871)
