= Pseudodon shell DUB1006-fL =

Prehistoric engraved shell

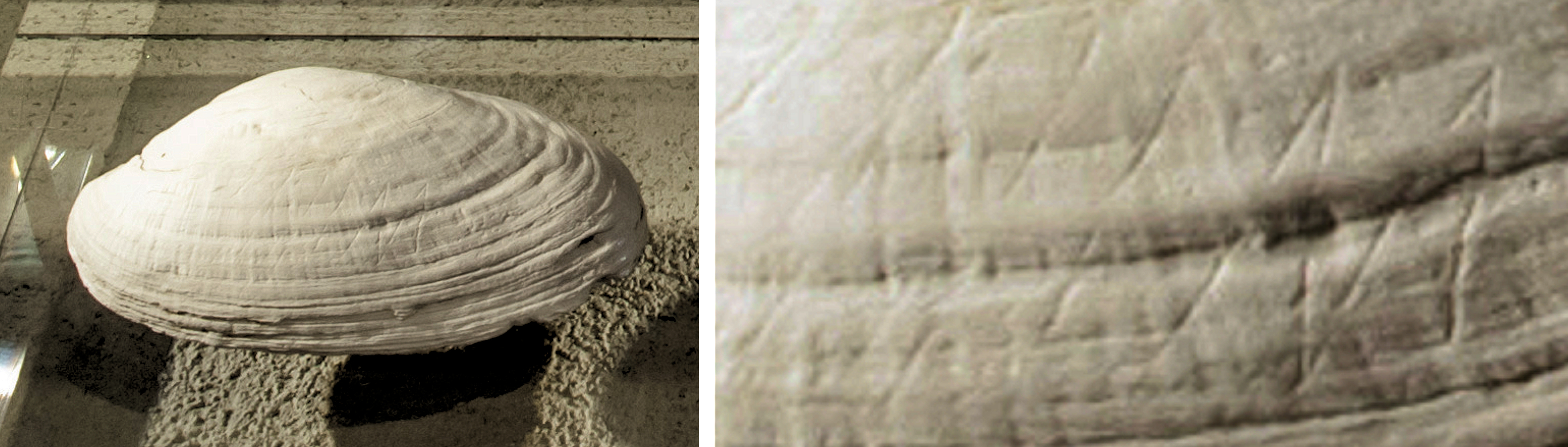
- Material: Pseudodon seashell
- Created: c. 485,000 years ago by Homo erectus
- Discovered: East Java, Indonesia
- Discovered by: Eugene Dubois

The Pseudodon shell DUB1006-fL or Pseudodon DUB1006-fL is a fossil shell of the freshwater bivalve Pseudodon vondembuschianus trinilensis found at the Trinil site in Java, Indonesia. The shell bears a zigzag-patterned engraving potentially made by Homo erectus, which could be the oldest known anthropogenic engraving in the world.

== Description ==
The shell is a part of an assemblage of fossil freshwater mussel shells, excavated by the Dutch paleoanthropologist and geologist Eugène Dubois in the 1890s from the Pleistocene layer of the Trinil site, Java, Indonesia. The assemblage, including the shell DUB1006-fL, is currently kept at the Naturalis Biodiversity Center, Leiden, The Netherlands.

Geometric engravings on the shell DUB1006-fL were discovered by biologist Josephine Joordens (then at Leiden University) and her colleagues in 2014. Their analysis suggests that the engravings were made by Homo erectus between 540,000 and 430,000 BP. The engravings were probably made on a freshly obtained shell using a shark tooth. It is also suggested that all the grooves were made by a single individual during a single session using the same tool.

== Interpretation ==
Joordens et al. do not give a direct interpretation of the engravings, but suggest that "engraving abstract patterns was in the realm of Asian Homo erectus cognition and neuromotor control." In her interview, Joordens says that since the intentions of the individual who made the engravings are not known, it is not possible to classify these engravings as art. "It could have been to impress his girlfriend, or to doodle a bit, or to mark the shell as his own property," says Joordens.

== Controversy ==
The main discussion happens around the question of whether the engraving on the shell can be considered as art (which would make it the earliest known artistic expression by hominids in the world). Some commentators of the original study, similar to the authors of the study, gave a neutral description of the engravings, calling them a "doodle" or "decorative marks". Some other commentators suggest explicitly that these engravings are art.

Tsion Avital, a philosopher of art and culture, makes a distinction between art and design and suggests that the engraving on Pseudodon DUB1006-fL cannot be seen as the former, but can well be the latter. He contests the description of the engraving by Joordens et al. who called it an "abstract pattern", saying that the terms "abstract" and "pattern" "hint obliquely at the possibility that these engravings possess some symbolic significance." "These engravings are in no sense abstract but rather are completely concrete marks," says Avital.

On 26 September 2025, the Netherlands agreed to repatriate the complete Dubois collection (of around 40,000 fossils) back to Indonesia, including the shell. The Indonesian government had previously requested the return of the Dubois collection as the collection is regarded as items looted by the Dutch during colonial rule.

== See also ==
- Homo erectus
- Java Man
- Venus of Tan-Tan
- Venus of Berekhat Ram
- Prehistoric art
- Art of the Middle Paleolithic
