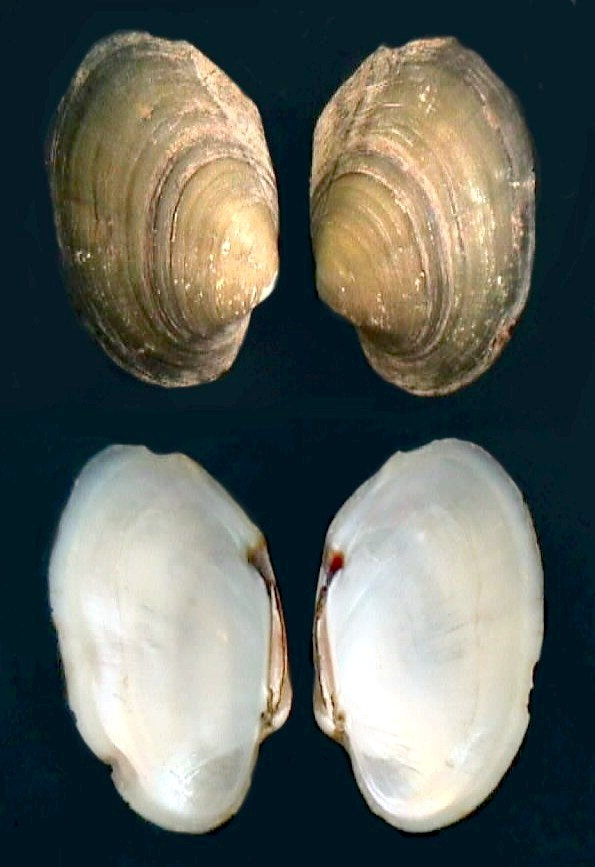
- Anodontites trapesialis

Scientific classification
- Domain: Eukaryota
- Kingdom: Animalia
- Phylum: Mollusca
- Class: Bivalvia
- Order: Unionida
- Superfamily: Etherioidea
- Family: Mycetopodidae; Gray, 1840

Diversity
- 4 subfamilies, 10 genera. See text.

= Mycetopodidae =

Family of bivalves

The Mycetopodidae are a family of freshwater pearly mussels in the order Unionida restricted to South America. They are named for the mushroom-like shape of their foot. Like all members of the Unionida they reproduce via a larval stage that temporarily parasitizes fish. Banarescu lists four subfamilies with ten genera in total.

== Classification ==
Four subfamilies are recognized.

=== Anodontitinae ===
- Anodontites

=== Mycetopodinae ===
- Mycetopoda
- Mycetopodella

=== Monocondylaeinae ===
- Monocondylaea
- Haasica
- Iheringella
- Fossula
- Tamsiella
- Diplodontites

=== Leilinae ===
- Leila
