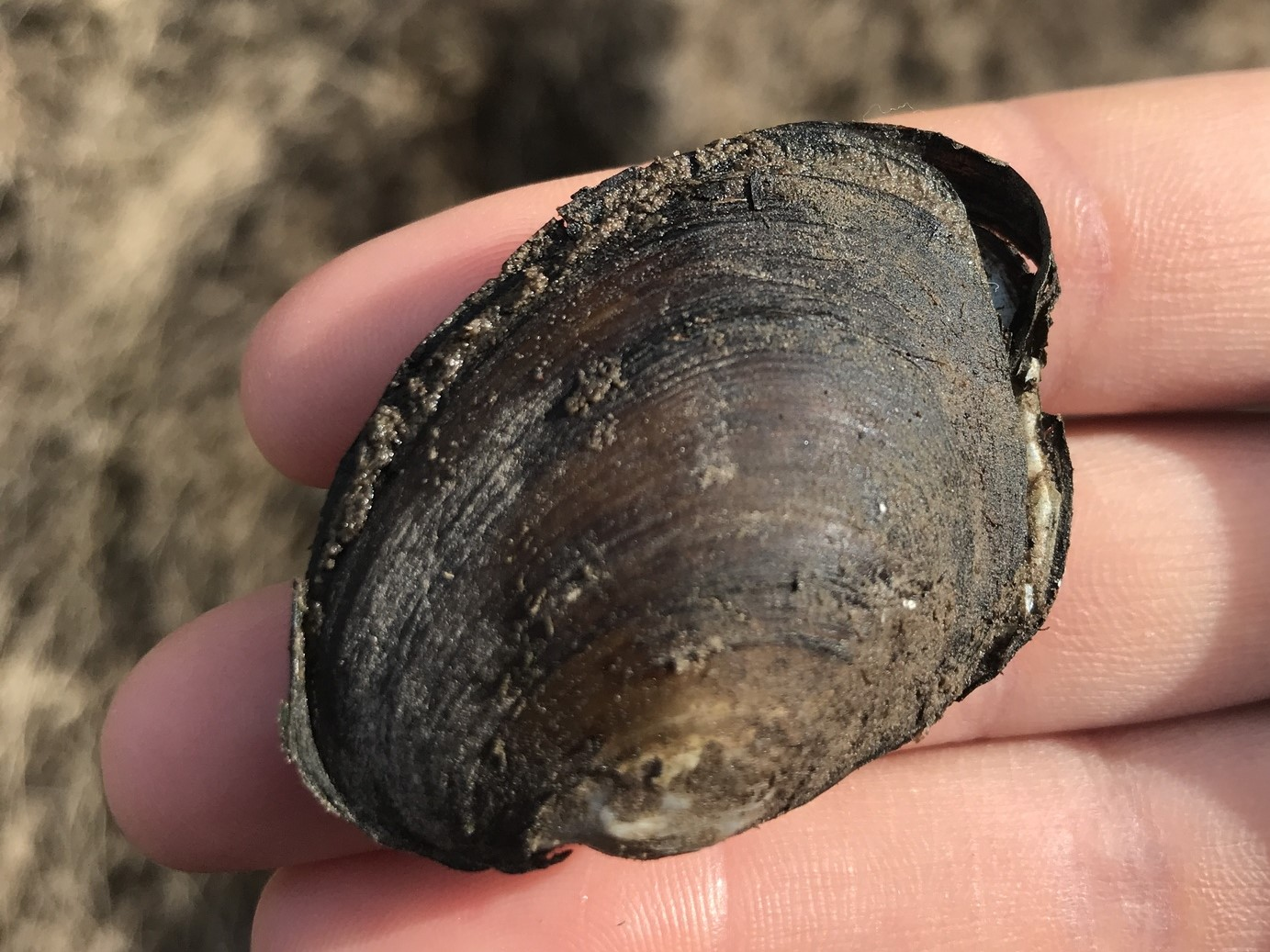
- Monocondylaea paraguayana

Scientific classification
- Domain: Eukaryota
- Kingdom: Animalia
- Phylum: Mollusca
- Class: Bivalvia
- Order: Unionida
- Family: Mycetopodidae
- Subfamily: Monocondylaeinae
- Genus: Monocondylaea d'Orbigny, 1835

= Monocondylaea =

Genus of molluscs

Monocondylaea is a genus of bivalves belonging to the family Mycetopodidae.

Species:

- Monocondylaea corrientesensis (d'Orbigny, 1835)
- Monocondylaea costulata (Moricand, 1858)
- Monocondylaea franciscana (Moricand, 1837)
- Monocondylaea guarayana (d'Orbigny, 1835)
- Monocondylaea jaspidea (Hupé, 1857)
- Monocondylaea minuana (d'Orbigny, 1835)
- Monocondylaea paraguayana (d'Orbigny, 1835)
- Monocondylaea parchappii (d'Orbigny, 1835)
