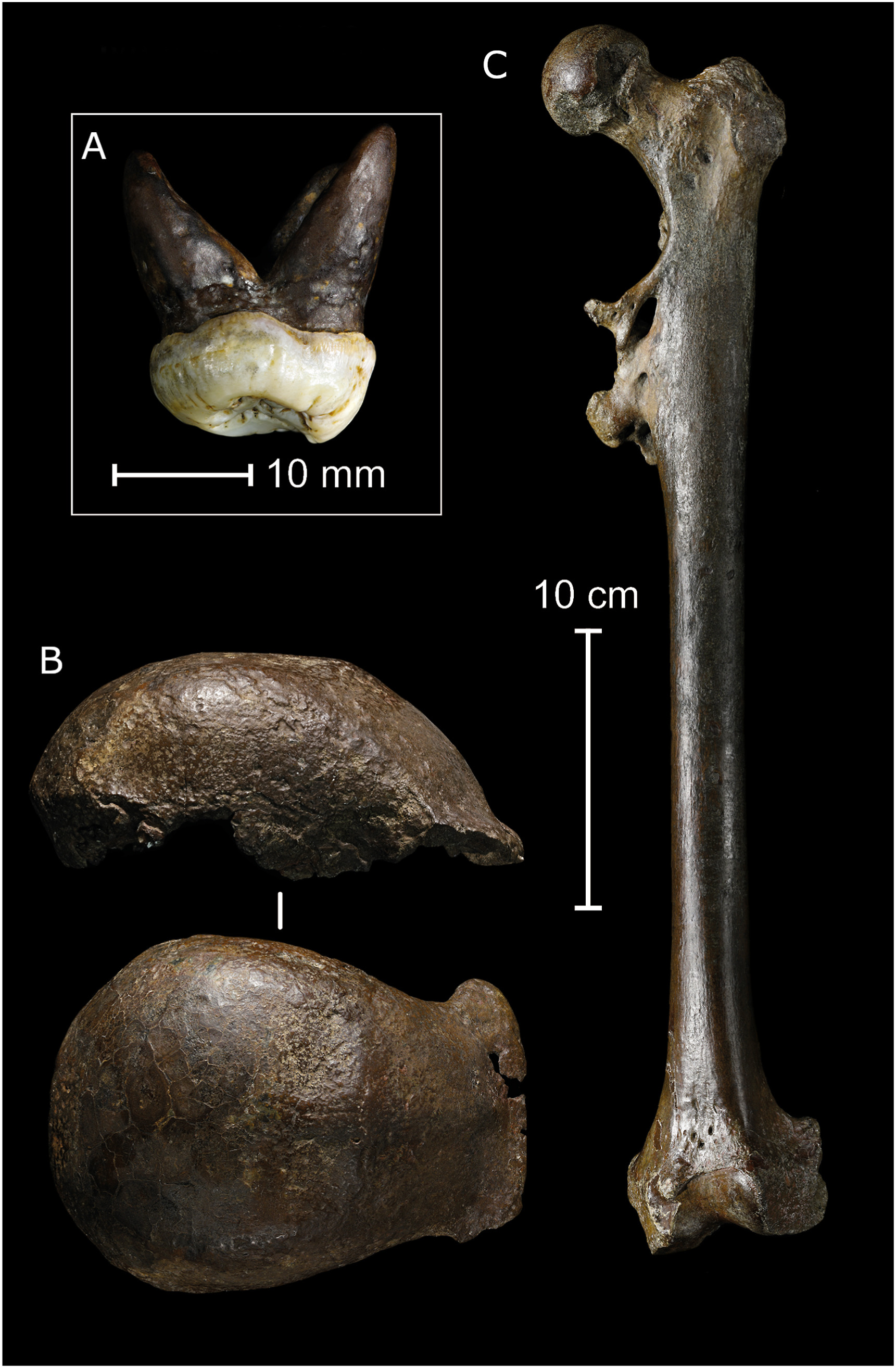
- Java Man, the holotype of H. erectus (Note: The Java Man femur presents a noticeable osteocyte, likely Paget's disease of bone and osteopetrosis (thickening of the bone), probably stemming from skeletal fluorosis caused by ingestion of food contaminated by fluoride-filled volcanic ash (as the specimen was found in ash-filled strata). Livestock that graze on volcanic ash-ridden fields typically die of acute toxicity within a few days or weeks.)

Scientific classification
- Kingdom: Animalia
- Phylum: Chordata
- Class: Mammalia
- Order: Primates
- Superfamily: Hominoidea
- Family: Hominidae
- Genus: Homo
- Species: †H. erectus

Binomial name
- †Homo erectus (Dubois, 1893)

= Homo erectus =

Homo erectus Temporal range: Pleistocene, 2–0.1 Ma

Extinct species of archaic human

Homo erectus (/ˌhoʊmoʊ əˈrɛktəs/ lit. 'upright man') is an extinct species of archaic human from the Pleistocene, spanning nearly 2 million years. It is the first human species to evolve a humanlike body plan and gait, to leave Africa and colonize Asia and Europe, and to wield fire. Some populations of H. erectus were ancestors of later human species, including H. heidelbergensis—the last common ancestor of modern humans, Neanderthals, and Denisovans. As such a widely distributed species both geographically and temporally, H. erectus anatomy varies considerably. Subspecies are sometimes recognized: H. e. erectus, H. e. pekinensis, H. e. soloensis, H. e. ergaster, H. e. georgicus, and H. e. tautavelensis.

The species was first described by Eugène Dubois in 1893 as "Pithecanthropus erectus" using a skullcap, molar, and femur from Java, Indonesia. Further discoveries around East Asia were used to contend that humanity evolved out of Asia. Based on historical race concepts, it was argued that local H. erectus populations evolved directly into local modern human populations (polycentrism) rather than all humanity sharing a single anatomically modern ancestor (monogenism). As the fossil record improved over the mid-to-late 20th century, the "Out of Africa" theory and monogenism became the consensus.

The typical skull has a pronounced brow ridge, a protruding jaw, and large teeth. The bones are much thicker than in modern humans. East Asian populations normally have an even more robust skeleton and larger brain volume—averaging 1,000 cc (61 cu in). Western H. erectus brain volume could be as low as 546 cc (33.3 cu in) in H. e. georgicus. H. erectus probably had a faster apelike growth trajectory, lacking the extended childhood required for language acquisition. Reconstructed adult body dimensions range from 141–167 cm (4 ft 8 in – 5 ft 6 in) in height and about 50 kg (110 lb) in weight.

H. erectus invented the Acheulean tool industry, a major innovation of large, heavy-duty stone tools. These may have been used in butchery, vegetable processing, and woodworking of spears and digging sticks. H. erectus was a major predator of large herbivores on the expanding savannas during the Quaternary glaciation. The species is usually characterized as the first hunter-gatherer and the first to practice sexual division of labor. Fire usage and cave habitation were probably not important aspects of daily life. Similarly, H. erectus may not have often ventured into colder regions or cooked meat. The last known occurrence of H. erectus is 108,000 to 117,000 years ago (H. e. soloensis) in Southeast Asia, until the last savannas in the region gave way to jungle.

== Taxonomy ==
=== Research history ===
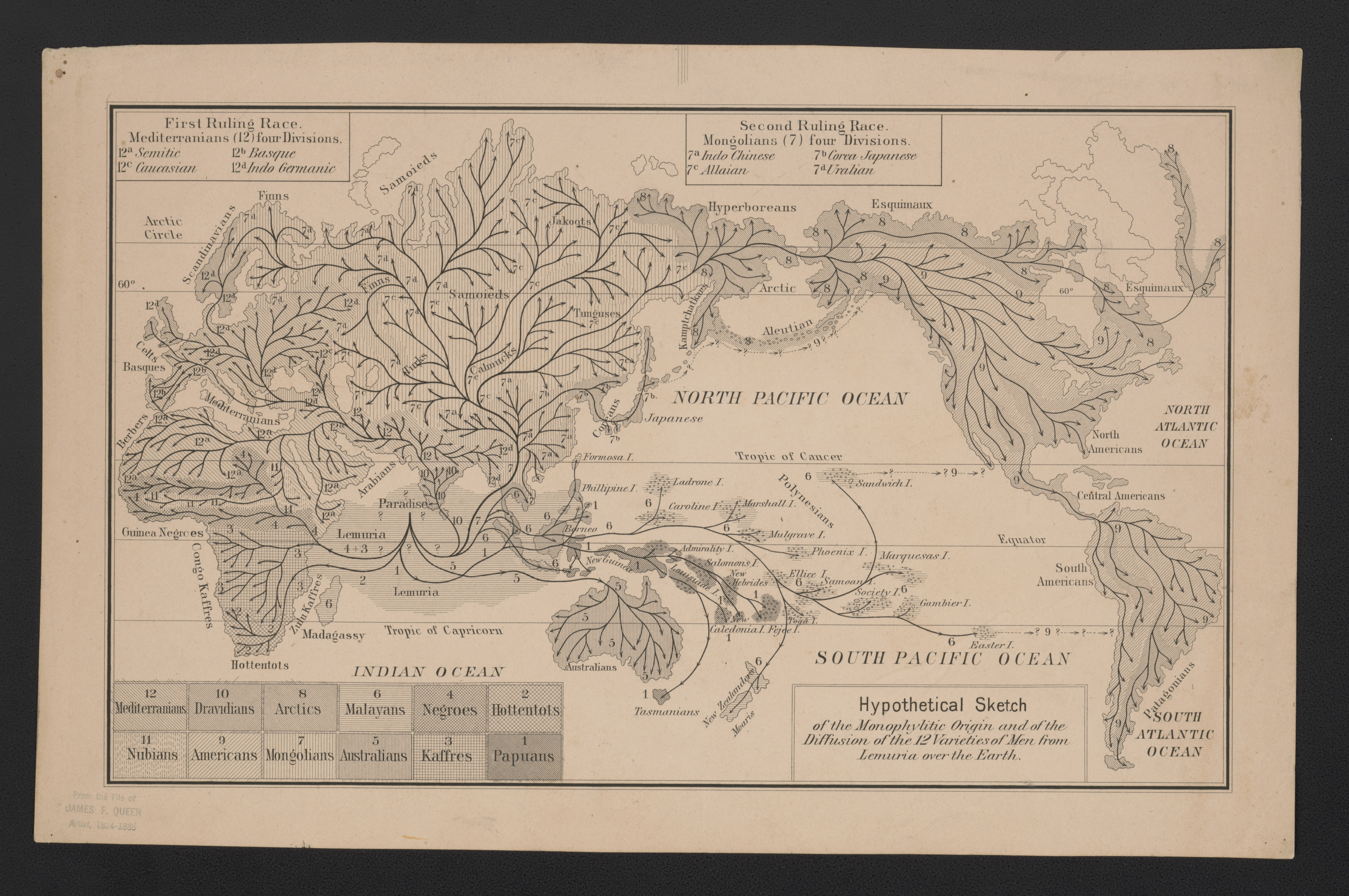
In 1868, Ernst Haeckel suggested that early humans dispersed from the now-disproven hypothetical continent "Lemuria".

While Charles Darwin had hypothesized in his 1871 Descent of Man that humans most likely evolved in Africa, (Note: Darwin's work mainly aimed to demonstrate that his theory of common descent with modification by natural and sexual selection applied to humans, "The sole object of this work is to consider, firstly, whether man, like every other species, is descended from some pre-existing form; secondly, the manner of his development; and thirdly, the value of the differences between the so-called races of man.") many late-19th century evolutionary naturalists postulated that Asia was the birthplace of humankind. Asia is midway between all continents via land routes or short sea crossings, providing optimal dispersal routes throughout the world. Among the major proponents of "Out of Asia" theory was Ernst Haeckel, who argued that the first human species (which he speculatively named Homo primigenius) evolved on a now-disproven hypothetical continent "Lemuria" from a species he termed Pithecanthropus alalus (speechless ape-man). "Lemuria" had supposedly sunk below the Indian Ocean, accounting for the lack of fossil evidence.

Dutch scientist Eugène Dubois joined the Royal Netherlands East Indies Army to search for the "missing link" of human evolution in Java. (Note: Dubois was studying the anatomy and evolution of the larynx in vertebrates in Amsterdam with German anatomist Max Fürbringer, but fed up with both the research and Fürbringer, he decided to drop everything and board the SS Prinses Amalia to the Dutch East Indies on 29 October 1887. Dubois said his interest in human evolution began in secondary school (the State Hogere Burgerschool), where he heard of lectures given by Carl Vogt in 1868.) At the Trinil site, his team found a skullcap and molar in 1891, and a femur in 1892 (Java Man), which he named "Pithecanthropus erectus" in 1893. He attempted to convince the European scientific community that he had found an upright-walking ape-man dating to the late Pliocene or Early Pleistocene; they dismissed his findings as some kind of non-human ape.

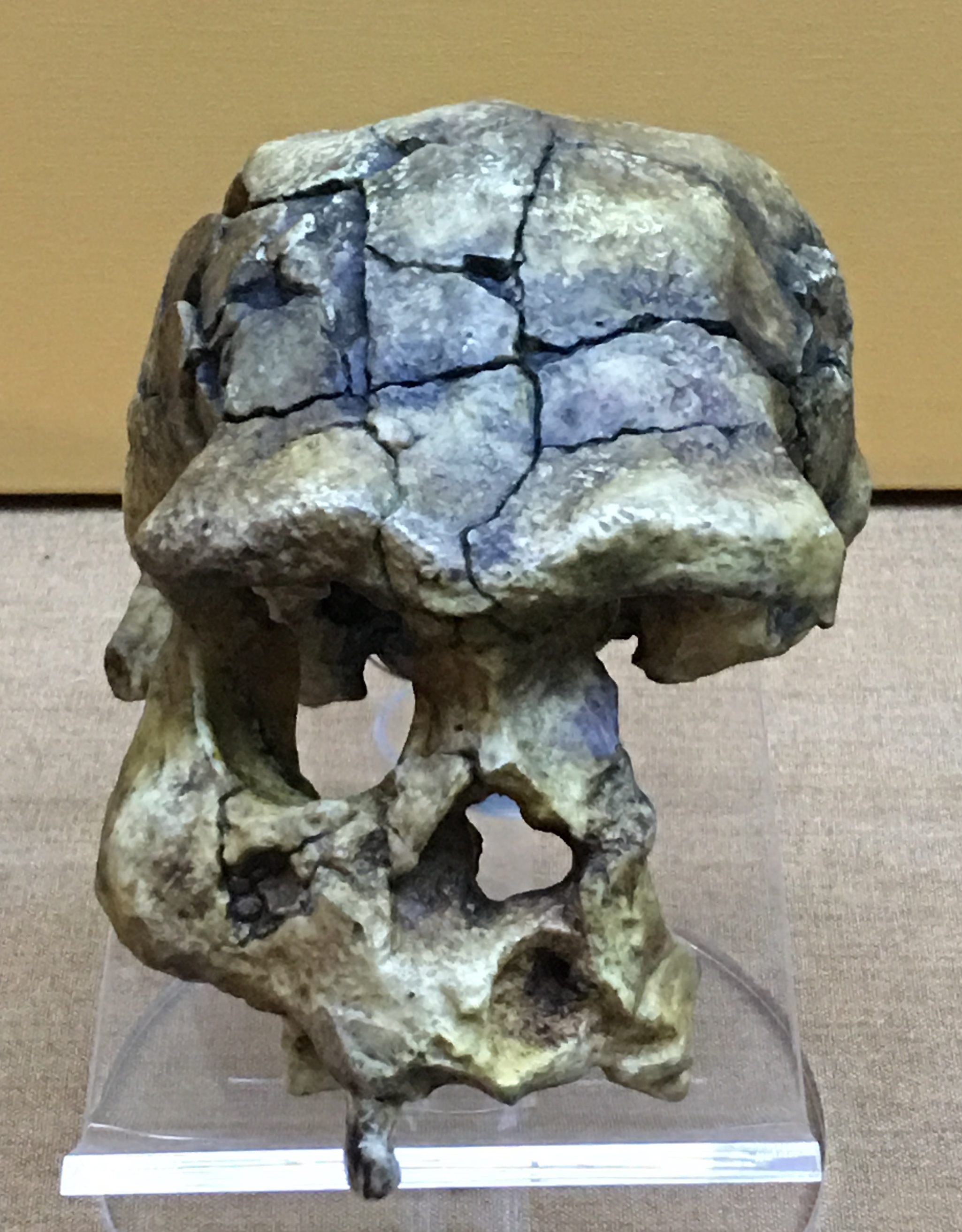
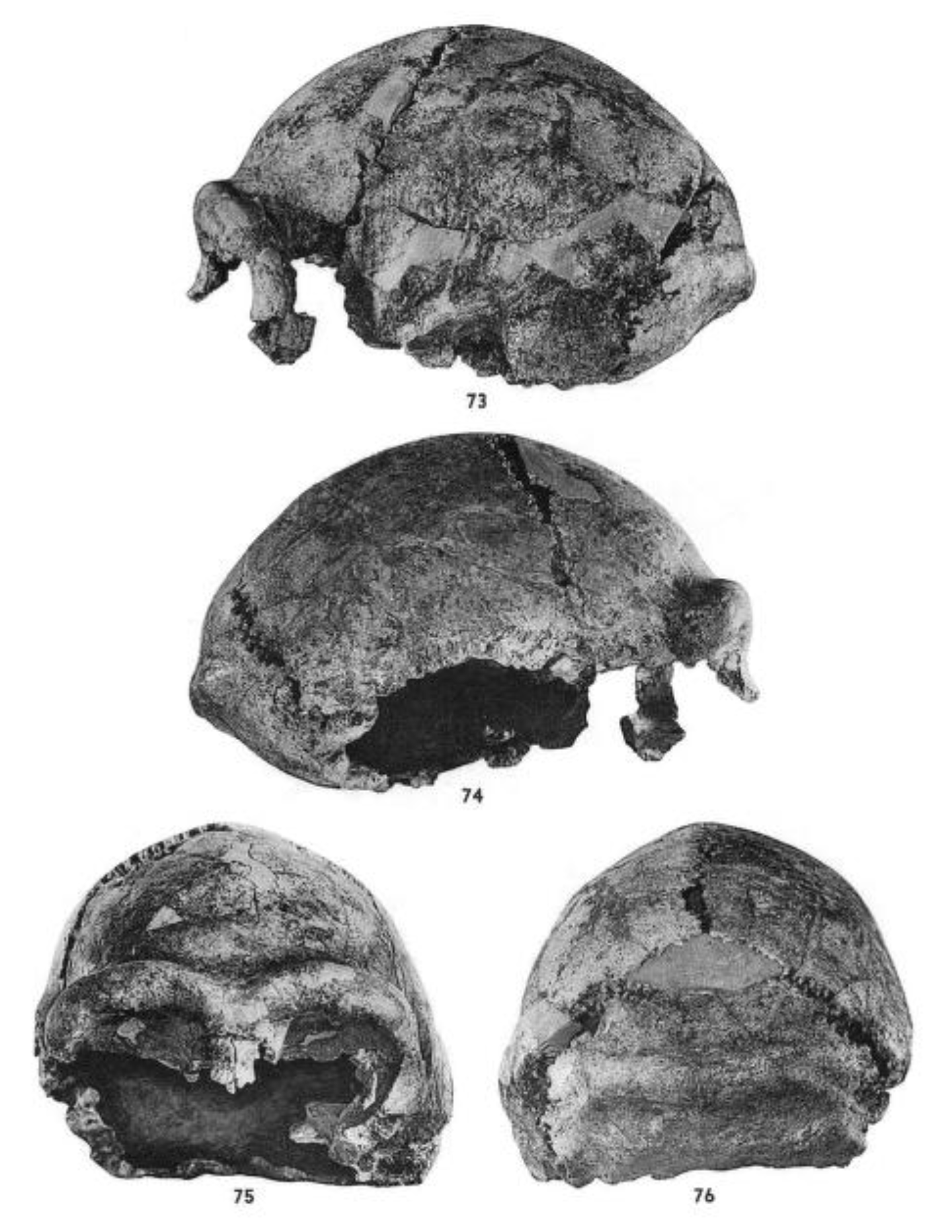
Using fossils like Sangiran (left) and Peking Man (right), Franz Weidenreich and Ralph von Koenigswald argued that Java Man was an ancient human.

Dubois argued that "P. erectus" was a gibbon-like ape which was the precursor to a more familiar human body plan, but in the 1930s, Jewish-German anatomist Franz Weidenreich noticed a striking similarity with ancient human remains recently being unearthed in China (Peking Man, "Sinanthropus pekinensis"). This characterization became better supported as German-Dutch palaeontologist Gustav Heinrich Ralph von Koenigswald discovered more Indonesian ancient human remains over the decade at Mojokerto, Sangiran, and Ngandong. (Note: Dubois never accepted that the Java Man was a type of human, and continued to fight Weidenreich and von Koenigswald until his death in 1940. Sir Arthur Keith described Dubois in an obituary notice as, "an idealist, his ideas being so firmly held that his mind tended to bend facts rather than alter his ideas to fit them.") Weidenreich believed that they were the direct ancestors of the local modern human Homo sapiens subspecies, in accord with historical race concepts (polycentricism)—that is, Peking Man was the direct ancestor of specifically Chinese people, and Java Man of Aboriginal Australians. As the significance of racial distinction diminished with the development of modern evolutionary synthesis, many fossil human species and genera around Asia, Africa, and Europe (including "Pithecanthropus" and "Sinanthropus") were reclassified as subspecies of Homo erectus.

During the late 20th century, some of the oldest H. erectus fossils were discovered across Africa, the first being Kenyan archeologist Louis Leakey's Olduvai Hominin 9 in 1960. As the human fossil record expanded, the "Out of Africa" theory and monogenism became the consensus: that all modern humans share a fully anatomically modern common ancestor. H. erectus is now generally considered to be an African species which later dispersed across Eurasia, with later African populations giving rise to the modern human lineage.

=== Subspecies ===
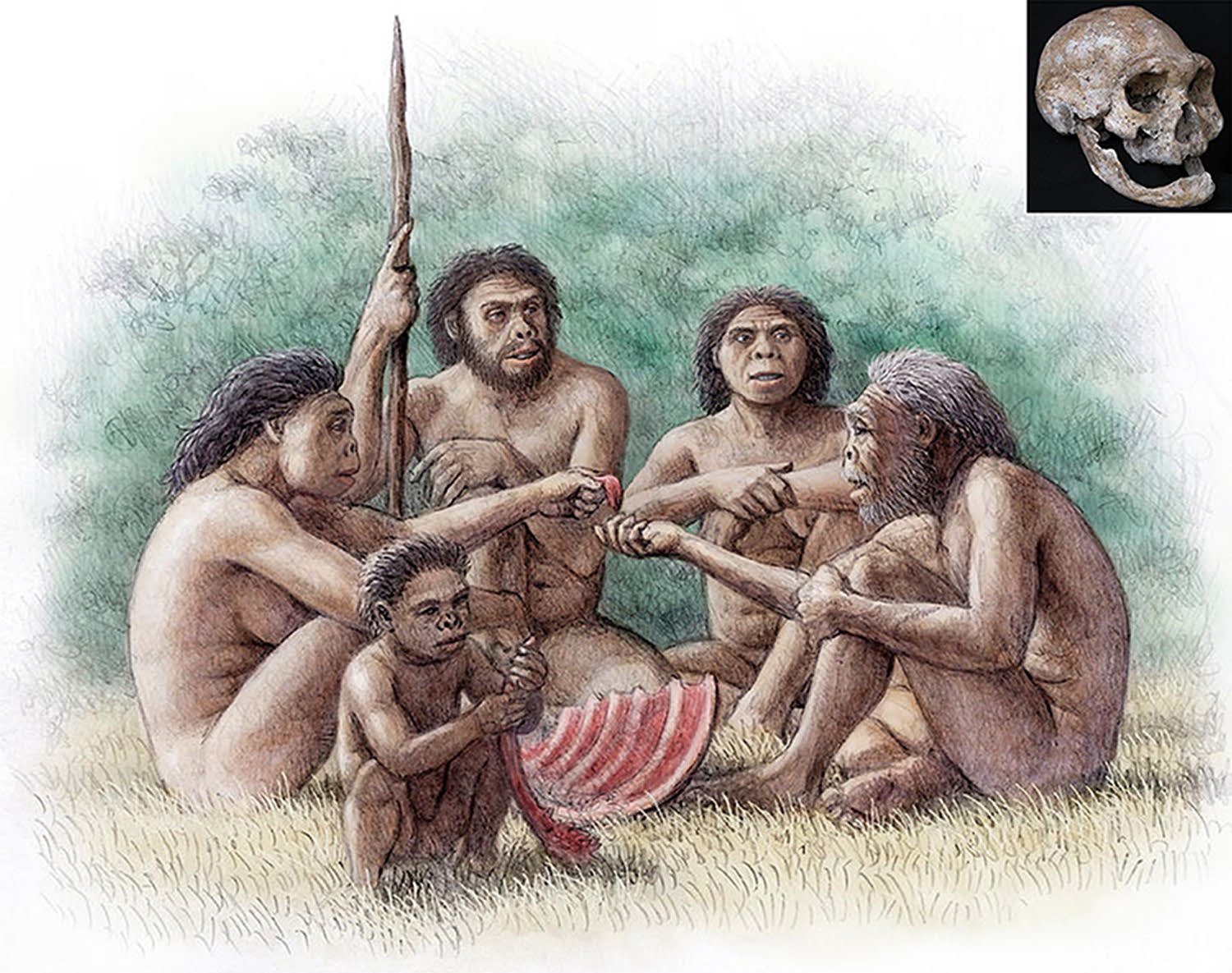
Artistic depiction of a group of Homo erectus georgicus, based on early hominin discoveries from Dmanisi.

By the middle of the 20th century, human taxonomy was in turmoil, with many poorly defined species and genera described across Europe, Asia, and Africa, which exaggerated the differences among them. In 1940, Weidenreich was the first to suggest reclassifying "Sinanthropus pekinensis" and "Pithecanthropus erectus" as subspecies of H. erectus. In 1950, German-American evolutionary biologist Ernst Mayr entered this field. Surveying a "bewildering diversity of names" and many proposals for consolidation, he decided to reclassify human fossils into three species of Homo: "H. transvaalensis" (the australopithecines), H. erectus (including "Sinanthropus", "Pithecanthropus", and various other Asian, African, and European taxa), and H. sapiens (including anything younger than H. erectus, such as modern humans and Neanderthals). Mayr defined these species as a sequential lineage, each evolving into the next (chronospecies). Though later Mayr changed his opinion on the australopithecines (recognizing Australopithecus), his more conservative view of archaic human diversity became widely adopted in the subsequent decades.

...never more than one species of man existed on the earth at any one time... If fossils of Congo pygmies and of Watusi were to be found in the same deposit by a paleontologist, a million years hence, he might well think that they belonged to two different species.

— Ernst Mayr, 1950

In the 1970s, as population genetics was being formulated, the anatomical variation of H. erectus across its wide geographic and temporal range (the basis for the subspecies distinctions) became better understood as clines—different populations which attained some anatomical regionality but were not reproductively isolated. In general, subspecies names for H. erectus are now used for convenience to indicate time and region rather than specific anatomical trends.

...to paleontologists in general, subspecies are epiphenomena which do not merit the attention paid to species... The pursuit of subspecies in the fossil record is at best fraught with difficulty, and is more probably futile.

— Ian Tattersall, 1986

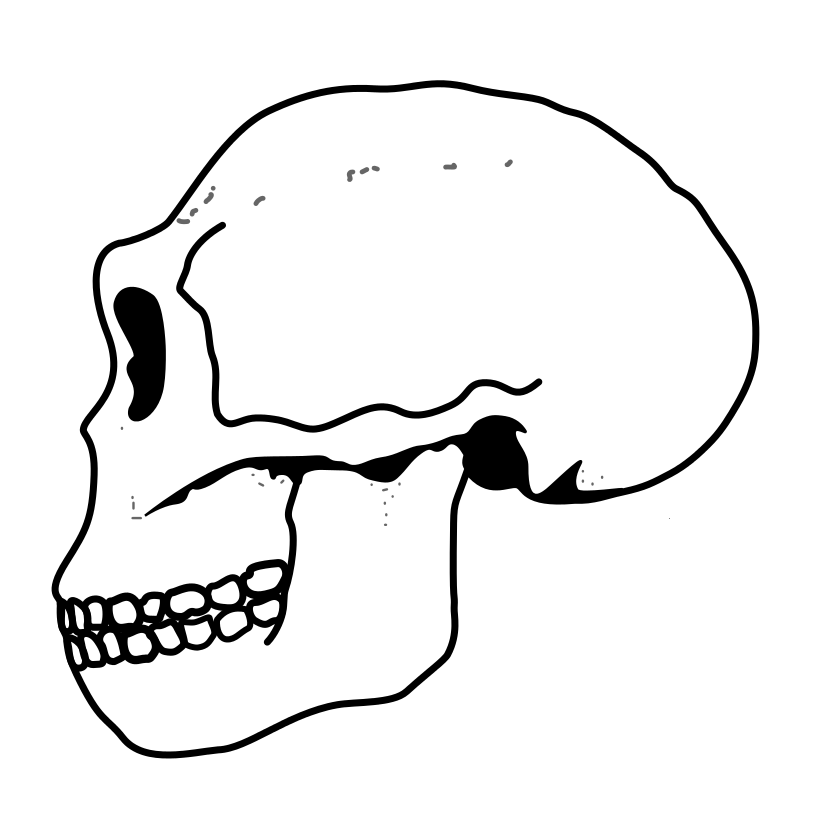
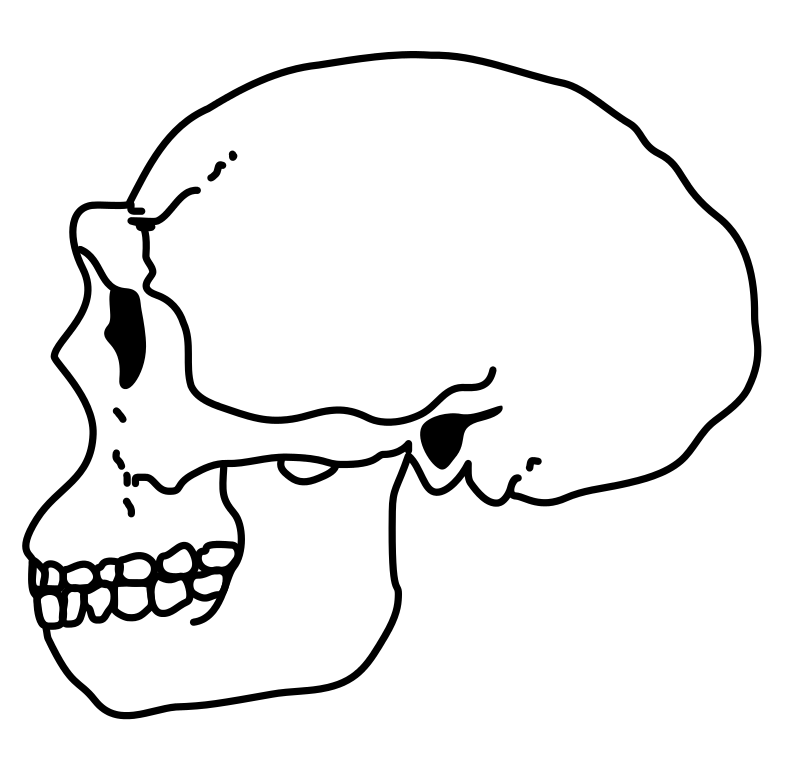
Reconstructions of H. e. ergaster (KNM ER 3733) left and H. e. pekinensis right

The more commonly used subspecies (if any are used) are:

- H. e. erectus for earlier Indonesian fossils
- H. e. pekinensis for Chinese fossils
- H. e. soloensis for the latest-surviving Indonesian fossils
- H. e. ergaster for African fossils
- H. e. georgicus for an early group of fossils from Georgia
- H. e. tautavelensis for Western European fossils

The ancient Georgia fossils have variably been classified as H. e. ergaster (or quadrinomial H. e. ergaster georgicus), as their own subspecies as H. e. georgicus, or as their own species H. georgicus. Some authors may also elevate H. ergaster, H. soloensis, and H. pekinensis to species level. Fossils relegated to H. e. tautavelensis are traditionally assigned to H. heidelbergensis.

=== Evolution and dispersal ===
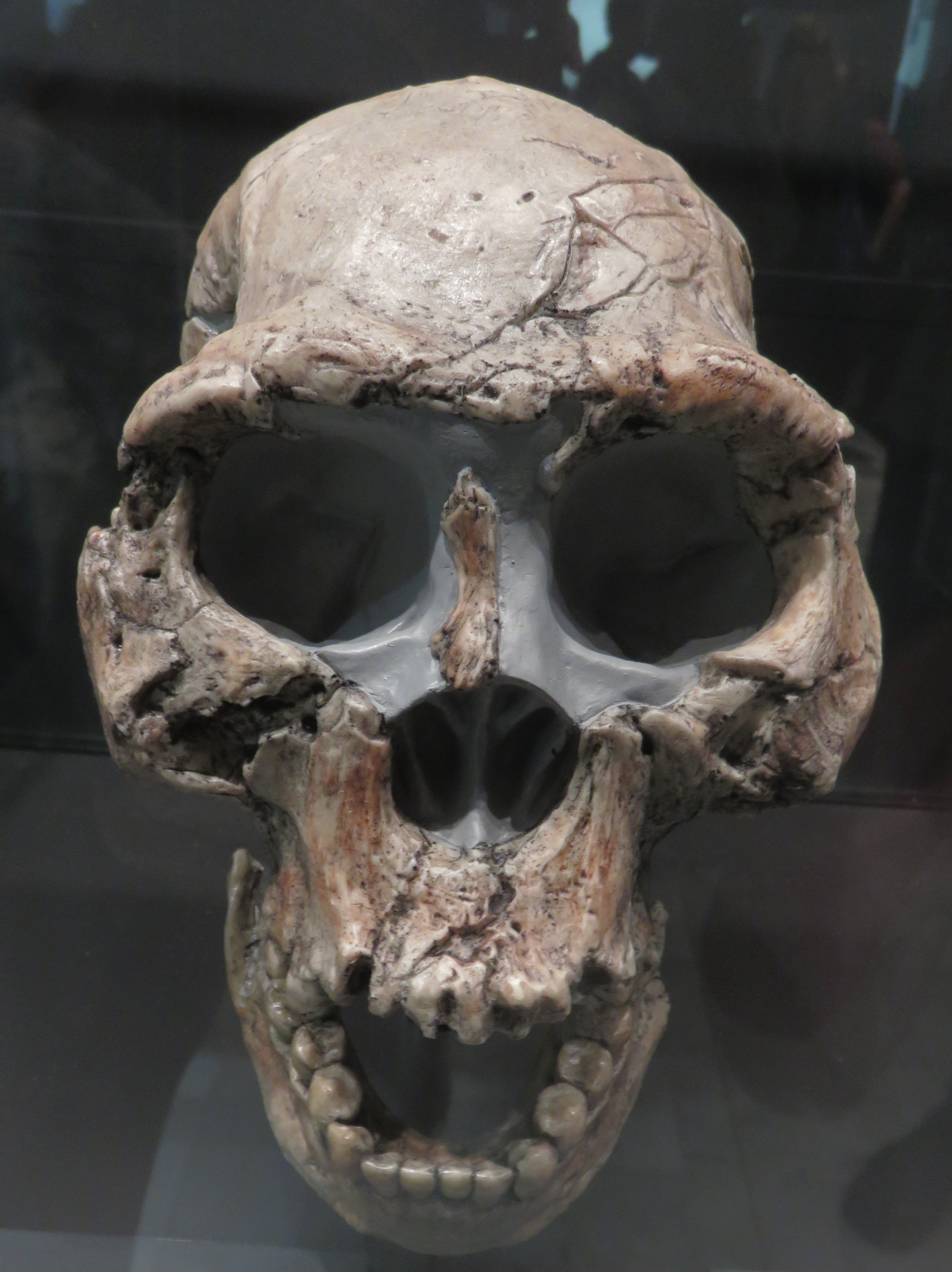
H. e. georgicus (above) represents one of the earliest dispersals out of Africa about 1.8 million years ago.

H. erectus evolved in Africa from a population of H. habilis and they coexisted for about half a million years. During this time interval, H. erectus populations could display a mix of more "classically erectus" or "classically habilis" cranial anatomy and a wide range of brain volumes. The oldest identified H. erectus specimen is a 2.04 million year old skull, DNH 134, from Drimolen, South Africa, coexisting with the australopithecine Paranthropus robustus. H. erectus dispersed out of Africa soon after evolution, the earliest recorded instances being H. e. georgicus 1.78 to 1.85 million years ago in Georgia, the Indonesian Mojokerto and Sangiran sites 1.6 to 1.8 million years ago, and the Chinese Yunxian Man 1.77 million years ago. Populations may have pushed into northwestern Europe at around the same time. While H. erectus is usually considered the first hominin to leave Africa, stone tools that may date to as far back as 2.48 and 2.1 million years ago (from Zarqa Valley, Jordan, and Shangchen, China, respectively) could indicate that an earlier hominin species left Africa. Since H. erectus was first defined in East Asia, those populations are sometimes distinguished as H. erectus sensu stricto ("in the strict sense"), and African and West Eurasian populations as H. erectus sensu lato ("in the broad sense"), but this may not reflect how these populations are actually related to each other. (Note: There may have been two different H. erectus dispersals into East Asia: an early one that led to the Sangiran Java Man (specifically the older material), and a later one which led to the northern Chinese Peking Man. That is, the older Sangiran material may be more closely related to H. erectus sensu lato than to Peking Man. The younger Sangiran material, though, possibly descended from or interbred with Chinese H. erectus.)

Once established around the Old World, H. erectus evolved into other later species in the genus Homo, including: H. heidelbergensis, H. antecessor, H. floresiensis, and H. luzonensis. H. heidelbergensis, in turn, is usually placed as the last common ancestor of Neanderthals (H. neanderthalensis), Denisovans, and modern humans. H. erectus is thus a non-natural, paraphyletic grouping of fossils and does not include all the descendants of a last common ancestor. Despite being designated as a different species, H. erectus may have interbred with some of its descendant species, namely the common ancestor of Neanderthals and Denisovans ("Neandersovans").

Successive dispersals of Homo erectus (yellow), Homo neanderthalensis (ochre) and Homo sapiens (red, Out of Africa II)

The dispersal of H. erectus is generally ascribed to the evolution of obligate bipedalism, better technology, and adoption of a carnivorous diet. However, the sudden adoption of carnivory could be sampling bias, with earlier species consuming the same amount of meat. Populations spread out via open grassland and woodland savannas, which were expanding due to a global aridification trend at the onset of the Quaternary glaciation. H. erectus is usually thought to have occupied the Sahara and West Asia during humid periods, but populations may have persisted into desert periods.

Most H. erectus sensu lato specimens date to 1 to 1.8 million years ago in the Early Pleistocene before giving way to descendant species. The classification of Middle Pleistocene Homo has been a controversial topic, termed "the muddle in the middle". H. erectus sensu stricto persisted much longer than sensu lato, with the youngest population (H. e. soloensis) dating to 108,000 to 117,000 years ago in Late Pleistocene Java. This population appears to have died out when the savannah corridors closed and tropical jungle took over.

A 2021 phylogeny of some H. erectus fossils using tip dating:

- Homo (2.85 million years ago)
  - H. habilis
  - H. erectus
    - - Stw 53 (1.9 million years ago)
      - Dmanisi (1.8 million years ago)
    - - Turkana (1.7 million years ago)
      - - Olduvai Hominid 9 (1.5 million years ago)
        - - Sangiran (1.4 million years ago)
          - - - - Nanjing Man (0.6 million years ago)
                - Peking Man (0.5 million years ago)
              - - Hexian (0.5 million years ago)
                - - Sambungmacan (0.2 million years ago)
                  - Ngandong (0.1 million years ago)
            - - H. heidelbergensis (Note: H. heidelbergensis is also a paraphyletic assemblage of fossils.)
              - - H. neanderthalensis
                - H. sapiens

== Biology ==
As such a widely distributed species both across regions and through time, the anatomy of H. erectus can vary considerably (regionality). Among living primates, the degree of regionality achieved by H. erectus (phenotypic plasticity) is only observed in modern humans.

=== Head ===
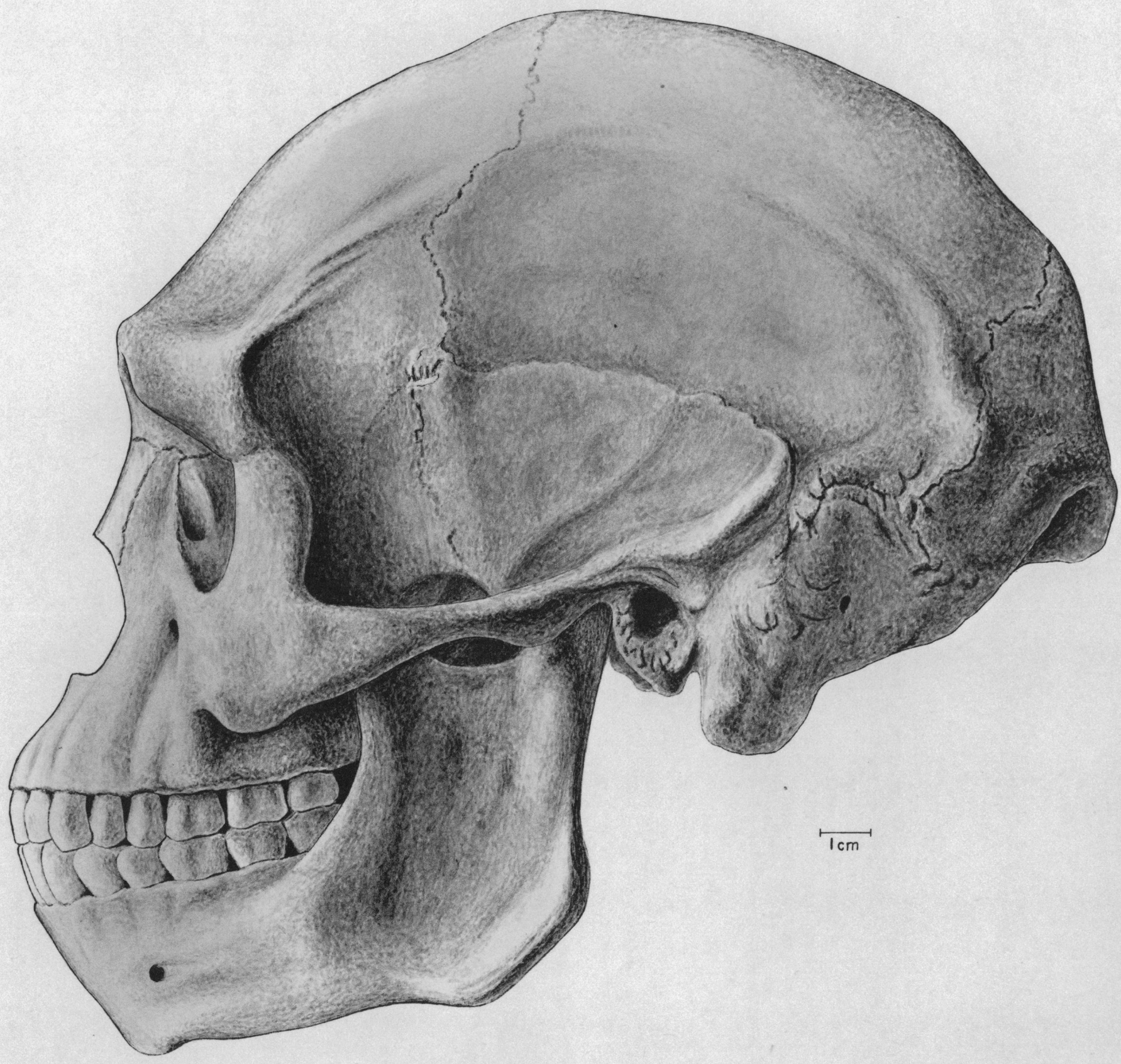
Franz Weidenreich's reconstruction of the H. e. soloensis skull

Dubois originally described the species using a skullcap, noting the traits of a low and thickened cranial vault and a continuous bar of bone forming the brow ridge (supraorbital torus). H. erectus fossils typically share these traits, but the Kenyan Koobi Fora skulls notably have thinner skulls and weaker supraorbital tori. He also used several other traits now considered more typical of H. erectus sensu stricto, such as a sagittal keel running across the midline of the skullcap, a bar of bone across the back of the skull (occipital torus), and a strong crest on the mastoid part of the temporal bone. These traits can be still be found, nonetheless, in a few H. erectus sensu lato specimens, namely the 1.47 million year old Olduvai Hominin 9.

Compared to H. erectus sensu lato, the skullcap of sensu stricto narrows considerably at the front, the face is bigger and presumably more prognathic (it juts out more, but the face is poorly documented), and the molars are larger particularly in Indonesian fossils. H. erectus was the first human species with a fleshy nose, which is generally thought to have evolved in response to breathing dry air in order to retain moisture. Compared to earlier Homo, H. erectus has smaller teeth, thinner enamel, and weaker mandibles (jawbone), likely due to a greater reliance on tool use and food processing.

The brain size of H. erectus varies considerably, but is generally smaller in H. erectus sensu lato, as low as 546 cc (33.3 cu in) in Dmanisi skull 5. East Asian H. erectus overall are rather big-brained, averaging roughly 1,000 cc, staying within the range of variation for modern humans. The late-surviving H. e. soloensis has the biggest brain volume with one specimen measuring 1,251 cc (76.3 cu in).

=== Body ===
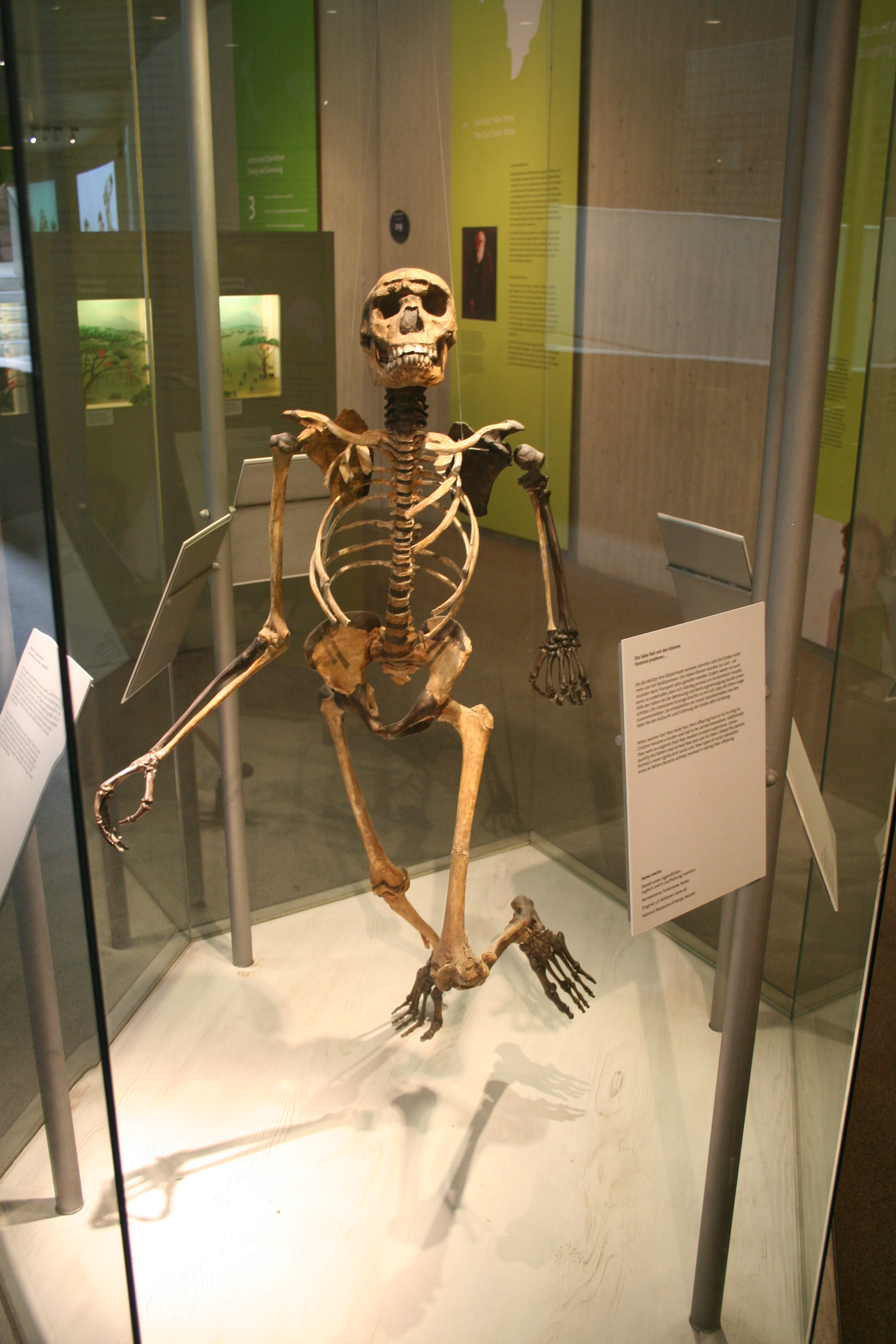
Turkana Boy at the Neanderthal Museum

The rest of the body is primarily understood by three partial skeletons from the Kenyan Lake Turkana site, notably Turkana Boy. Other postcranial fossils (all bones aside from the skull) attributed to H. erectus are not associated with a skull, making attribution unverifiable. Though the body plan of earlier Homo is poorly understood, H. erectus is usually characterized as the first Homo species with a human body plan, distinct from non-human apes. The chest may have been short and barrel-shaped, like other archaic humans. Fossil tracks near Ileret, Kenya, suggest a human gait. This adaptation is implicated in the dispersal of H. erectus across the Old World.

It is unclear when human ancestors lost most of their body hair. Genetic analysis suggests that high activity in the melanocortin 1 receptor, which produces dark skin, dates back to 1.2 million years ago. This could indicate the evolution of hairlessness around this time, as a lack of body hair would have left the skin exposed to harmful UV radiation. It is possible that populations in higher latitudes developed lighter skin to prevent vitamin D deficiency, though a 300,000 to 500,000 year old Turkish H. erectus specimen presents the earliest case of tuberculous meningitis, which is typically exacerbated by vitamin D deficiency in dark-skinned people living in higher latitudes. Hairlessness is generally thought to have facilitated sweating, but it may also have helped to reduce parasite load, and was possibly reinforced by sexual selection.

=== Size ===
Height reconstructions range approximately 141–167 cm (4 ft 8 in – 5 ft 6 in), with tropical populations typically reconstructed as scoring on the higher end like modern human populations. Adult weight is harder to approximate, but about 50 kg (110 lb) may have been normal. H. erectus is usually thought to be the first human species with little size-specific sexual dimorphism, but the variability of postcranial material makes this unclear. A 2010 study estimates that the Turkana Boy would have reached a height of 163 cm (5 ft 4 in) if he had reached adulthood.

=== Growth and development ===
The dimensions of a 1.8 million years old adult female H. e. ergaster pelvis from Gona, Ethiopia, suggests that she would have been capable of birthing children with a maximum prenatal brain size of 315 cc (19.2 cu in), about 30–50% of adult brain size, falling between chimpanzees (~40%) and modern humans (28%). Similarly, a 1.5 million year old infant skull from Mojokerto had a brain volume of about 72–84% the size of an adult, which suggests a brain growth trajectory more similar to that of non-human apes. This suggests that the childhood growth and development of H. erectus was intermediate between that of chimpanzees and modern humans, and the faster development rate suggests that altriciality (an extended childhood) evolved at a later stage in human evolution. The faster development rate might also indicate a shorter expected lifespan compared to later Homo.

=== Bone thickness ===
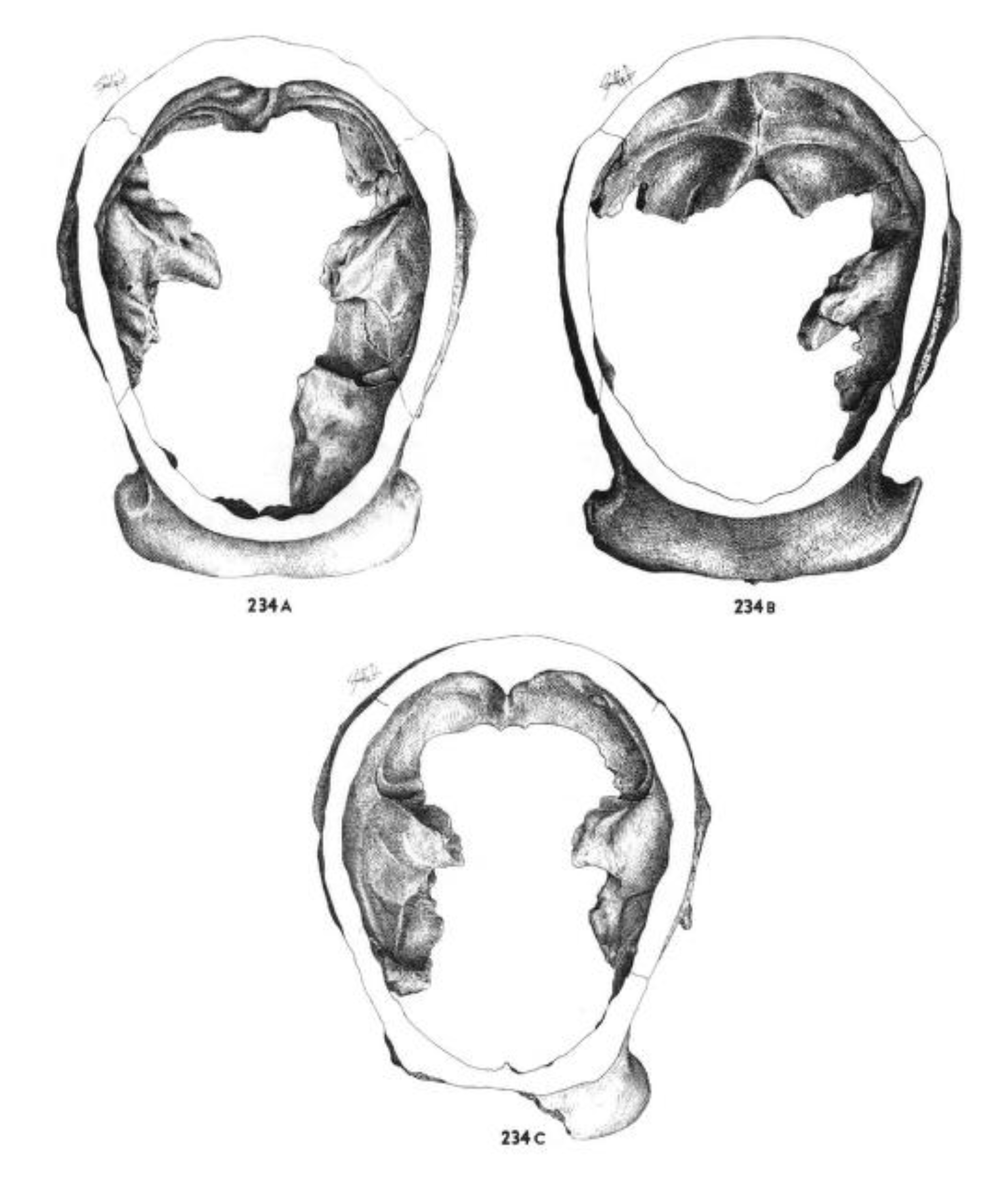
Cross sections of Peking Man Skulls III (A) and XII (B), and Java Man Skull II (C)

The bones are extraordinarily thickened, particularly in Homo erectus sensu stricto, so much so that skull fragments have sometimes been confused for fossil turtle carapaces. The medullary canal in the long bones (where the bone marrow is stored, in the limbs) is extremely narrowed (medullary stenosis). This degree of thickening is usually exhibited in semi-aquatic animals which use their heavy (pachyosteosclerotic) bones as ballasts to help them sink, induced by hypothyroidism.

It is unclear what function intense bone thickening could have served. Before more complete skeletons were discovered, Weidenreich suggested H. erectus was a gigantic species. Other explanations include a far more violent and impact-prone lifestyle than other Homo, or pathological nutrient deficiencies. The supraorbital torus thickens with age, and may be a response to bending stresses from habitual loading of the front teeth.

== Culture ==
=== Subsistence ===
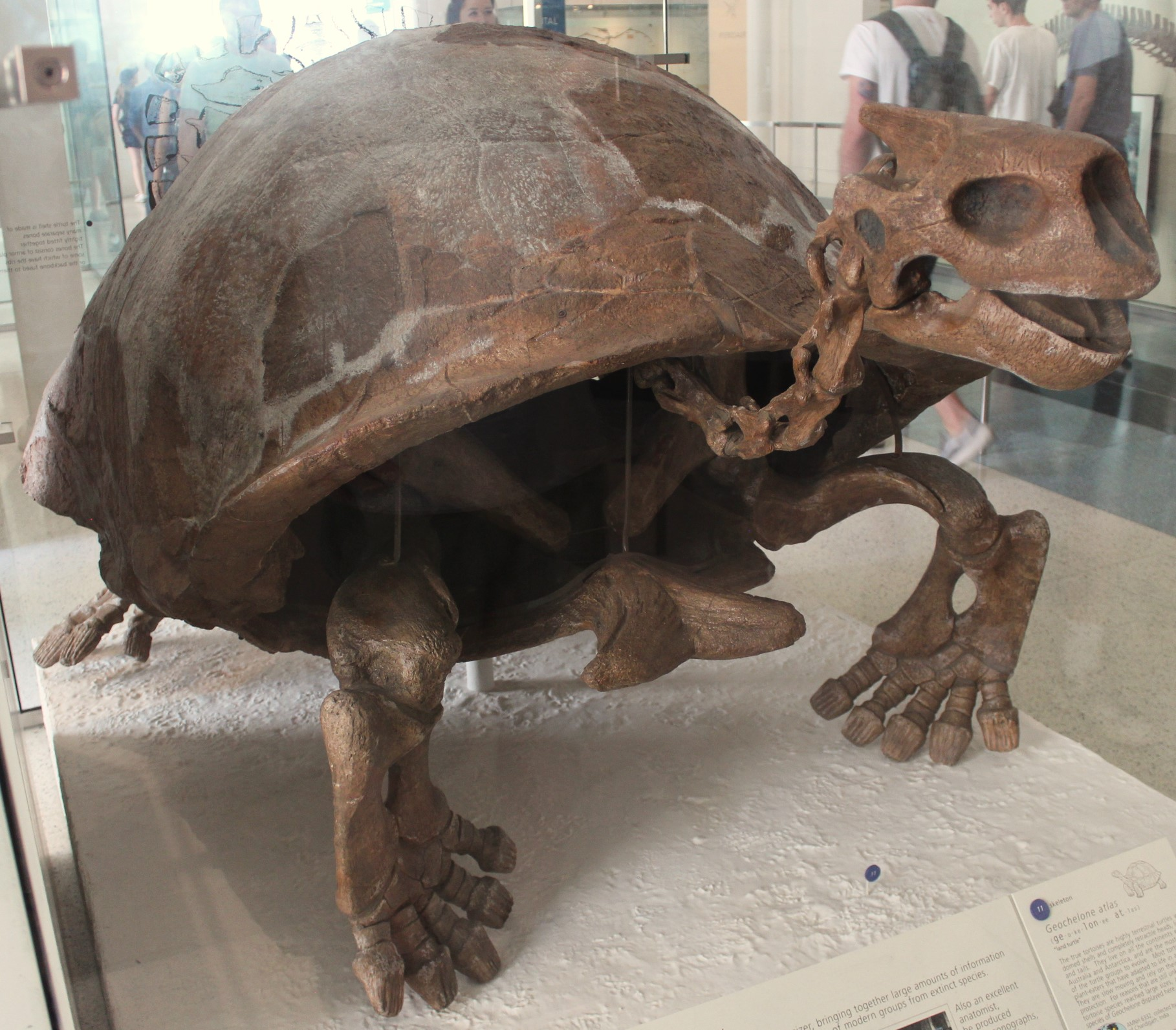
H. erectus overhunting may have led to the extinction of Megalochelys (above).

H. erectus was early-on portrayed as the earliest hunter-gatherer and a skilled predator of big game, relying on running. The few identified specimens of the H. e. ergaster torso and pelvis may indicate a body plan more conducive for power running, unlike modern humans better adapted for endurance running. The gradual shift to "top predator" may have led to its dispersal throughout Afro-Eurasia. Though scavenging may have instead played a bigger role at least in some populations, H. erectus fossils are often associated with the butchered remains of large herbivores, especially elephants, rhinos, hippos, bovines, and boars. Tracking complex prey behaviors as well as the nutritional value of meat have been connected to brain volume growth.

H. erectus is usually assumed to have practiced sexual division of labor much like recent hunter-gatherer societies, with men hunting and women gathering. This model is supported by a fossil trackway from Ileret, Kenya, made by a probably all-male band of over 20 H. erectus individuals, possibly a hunting party or (similar to chimpanzees) a border patrol group.

Since common modern human tapeworms began to diverge from those of other predators roughly 1.7 million years ago (specifically the pork tapeworm, beef tapeworm, and Asian tapeworm), not only was H. erectus consuming meat regularly enough for speciation to occur in these parasites, but meat was probably consumed raw more often than not. Some populations were collecting aquatic resources like fish, shellfish, and turtles at waterside sites, such as Lake Turkana and Trinil. Underground storage organs (roots, tubers, etc.) were likely also major dietary components, and traces of the edible plant Celtis have been documented at several H. erectus sites.

Possibly due to overhunting of the biggest game available, the dispersal of H. erectus and descendant species may be implicated in the extinctions of large herbivores and the gradual reduction of average herbivore size over the Pleistocene. H. erectus overhunting has been blamed by some authors for the decline of proboscidean species as well as competing carnivores, but their decline may be better attributed to the spread of grasslands. The giant tortoise Megalochelys may have been driven to extinction by H. erectus in Sundaland (what is now Island Southeast Asia), since species went extinct shortly after the arrival of H. erectus.

=== Technology ===
==== Stone tools ====
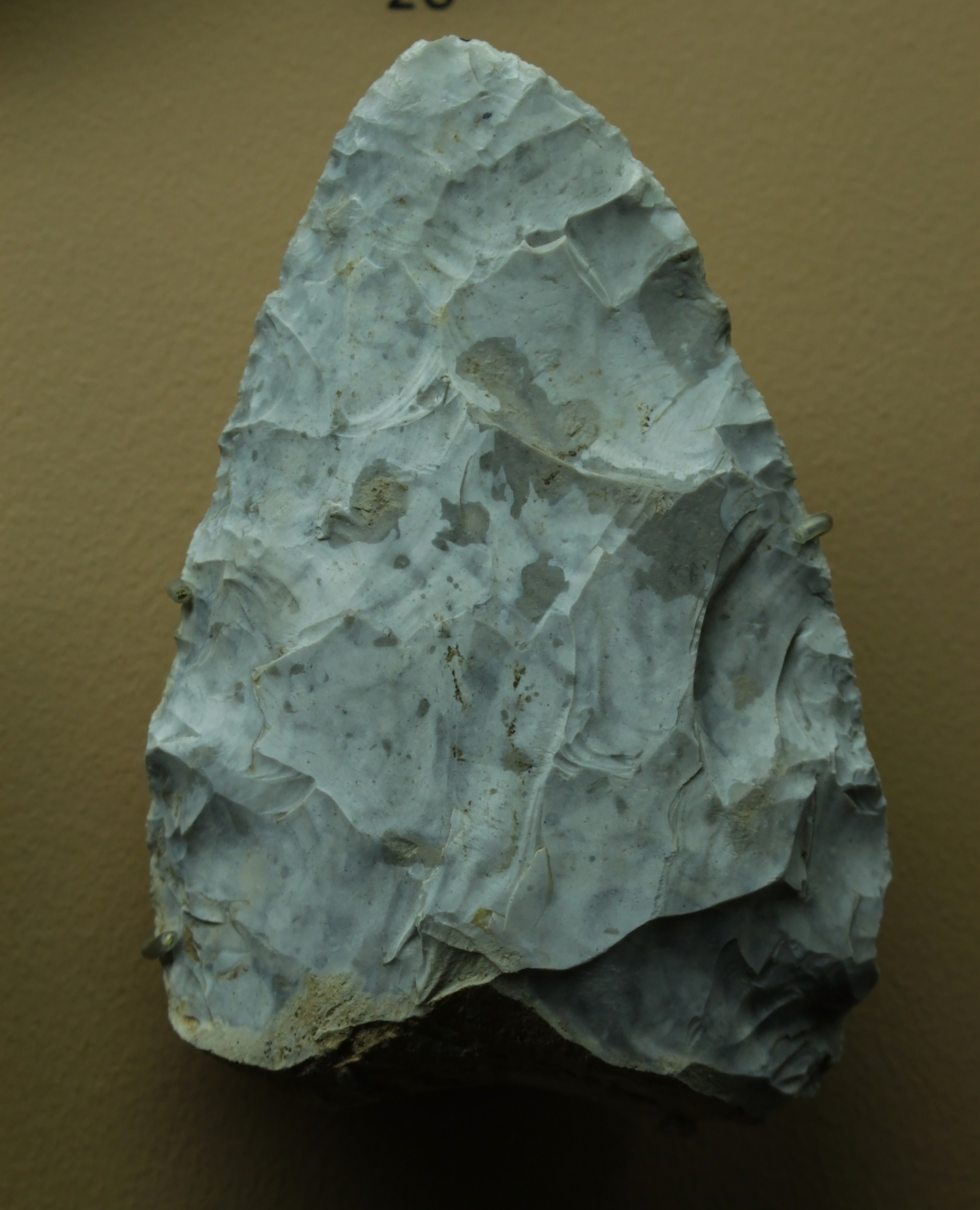
A handaxe from the Saint-Acheul site at the Musée d'Archéologie nationale, France

H. erectus manufactured Lower Paleolithic technologies, and is credited with the invention of the Acheulean stone tool industry at latest 1.95 million years ago. This was a major technological breakthrough featuring large, heavy-duty tools; most iconically, the handaxe. Over hundreds of thousands of years, the Acheulean eventually replaced its predecessor—the Oldowan (a chopper and flake industry)—in Africa, and spread out across Western Eurasia. This sudden innovation was typically explained as a response to environmental instability in order to process more types of food and broaden the diet combined with increasing brain size, which also allowed H. erectus to colonize Eurasia. Despite this characterization of the Acheulean, the small-brained H. e. georgicus was able to leave Africa despite only manufacturing Oldowan-style tools, the 1.6 million year old DAN5/P1 specimen from Gona, Ethiopia is associated with Acheulean style tools despite its low brain volume of 598 cc (36.5 cu in), and the handaxe does not seem to have been manufactured commonly in East Asia. The lack of East Asian handaxes was first noted by American archaeologist Hallam L. Movius in 1948, who drew the "Movius Line", dividing the East into a "chopping-tool culture" and the West into a "hand axe culture". Movius took this as evidence of inferiority of Far Eastern populations:

...as early as Lower Palaeolithic times Southern and Eastern Asia as a whole was a region of cultural retardation...very primitive forms of Early Man apparently persisted there long after types at a comparable stage of physical evolution had become extinct elsewhere.

— Hallam L. Movius, 1948

H. erectus seems to have been using stone tools in butchery, vegetable processing, and woodworking (maybe manufacturing spears and digging sticks). In Africa, Oldowan sites are typically found alongside major fossil assemblages, but Acheulean sites normally feature more stone tools than fossils, so H. erectus could have been using choppers and handaxes for different activities. These stone tools probably were not hafted onto spears; this innovation is associated with the transition to the Middle Paleolithic and the emergence of Neanderthals and modern humans.

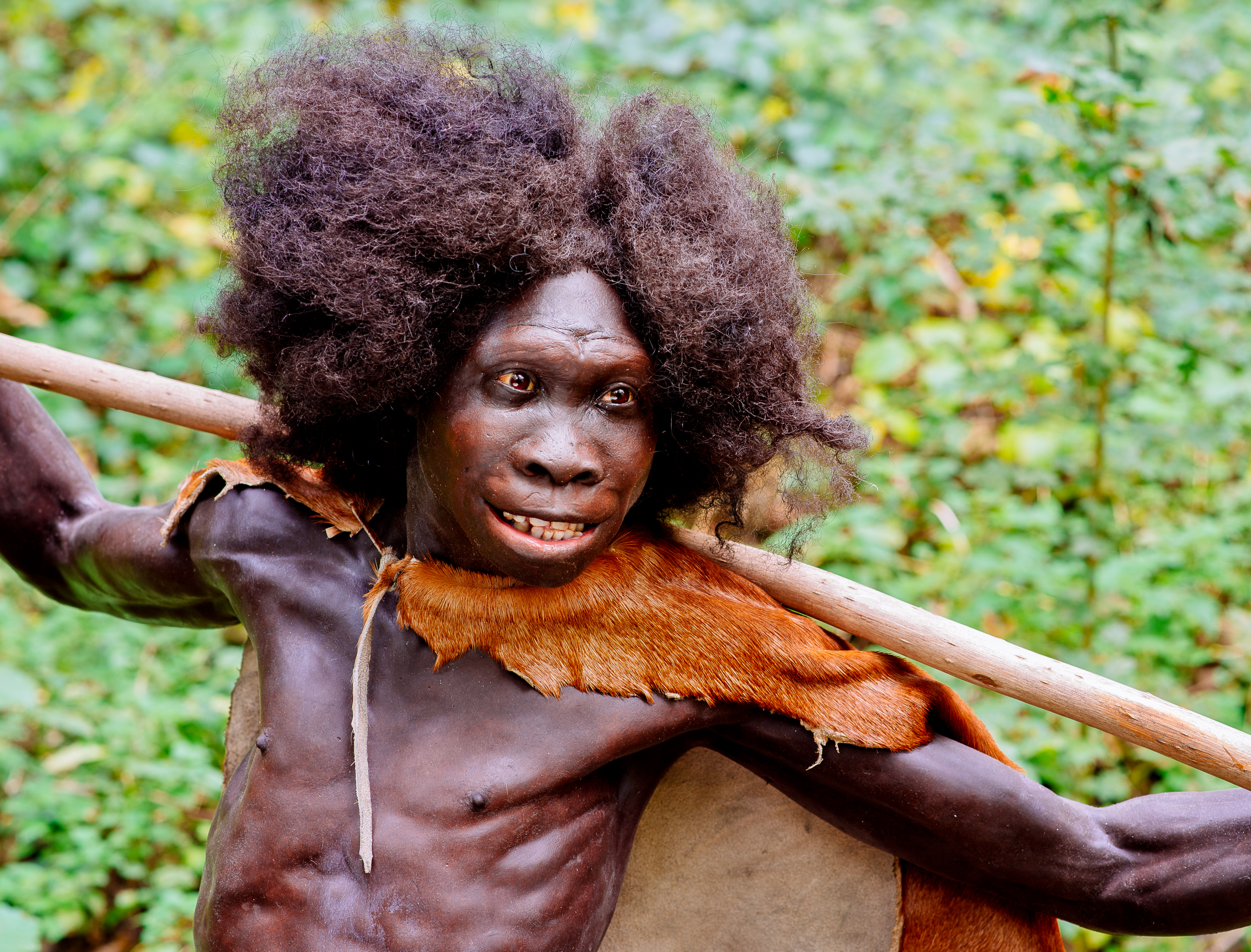
Reconstruction of Turkana Boy at the Neanderthal Museum wearing a cloak and hoisting a wooden carrying pole

Materials for stone tools were normally sourced locally, and it seems blanks were usually chosen based on size rather than material quality. H. erectus also produced tools from shells at Sangiran and Trinil.

==== Fire ====
H. erectus is credited as the first human species to wield fire. The earliest claimed fire site is Wonderwerk Cave, South Africa, at 1.7 million years old. While the species' dispersal far out of Africa has often been attributed to fire and cave dwelling, fire does not become common in the archaeological record until 300,000 to 400,000 years ago, and cave-dwelling about 600,000 years ago. Therefore, H. erectus may have only been scavenging fire opportunistically. Similarly, H. erectus sites usually stay within warmer tropical or subtropical latitudes.

The dating of northerly populations (namely Peking Man) could suggest that they were retreating to warmer refugia during glacial periods, but the precise age of the Peking Man fossils is poorly resolved. There have been claims of manmade hearths and "clear-cut evidence for intentional fire use", ostensibly as far back as 770,000 years ago in the supposed cave home of Peking Man. At the French Caune de L'Arago, Tautavel Man does not seem to have been using fire at all, even though occupation sequences span two cold periods.

==== Healthcare ====
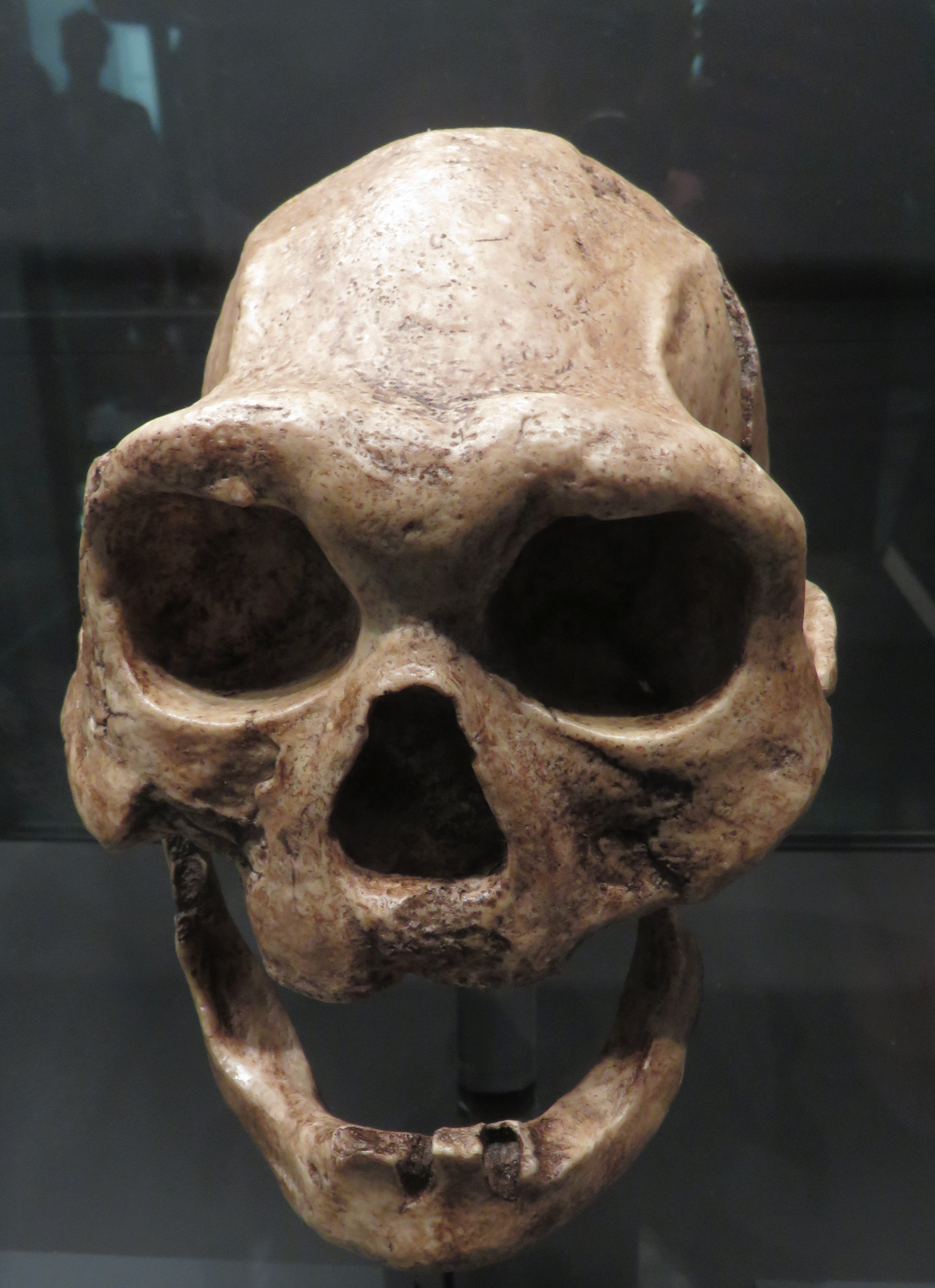
The single-toothed H. e. georgicus specimen (above) is the earliest probable example of human group care.

Like other primates, H. erectus probably used medicinal plants and infirmed sick group members. The earliest probable example of human group care is a 1.77 million year old H. e. georgicus specimen who had lost all but one tooth due to age or gum disease (the earliest example of severe chewing impairment) yet still survived for several years afterwards.

==== Seafaring ====
H. erectus made long sea crossings to arrive on the islands of Flores, Luzon, and some Mediterranean islands. Some authors have asserted that H. erectus intentionally made these crossings by inventing watercraft and seafaring so early in time, speaking to advanced cognition and language skills. These populations could have also been founded by natural rafting events instead.

=== Art and rituals ===
In East Asia, H. erectus is usually represented only by skullcaps, which used to be interpreted as widespread cannibalism and ritual headhunting. This had been reinforced by the historic practice of headhunting and cannibalism in some recent Indonesian, Australian, and Polynesian cultures, which were formerly believed to have directly descended from these H. erectus populations. The lack of the rest of the skeleton is now normally explained by natural phenomena.

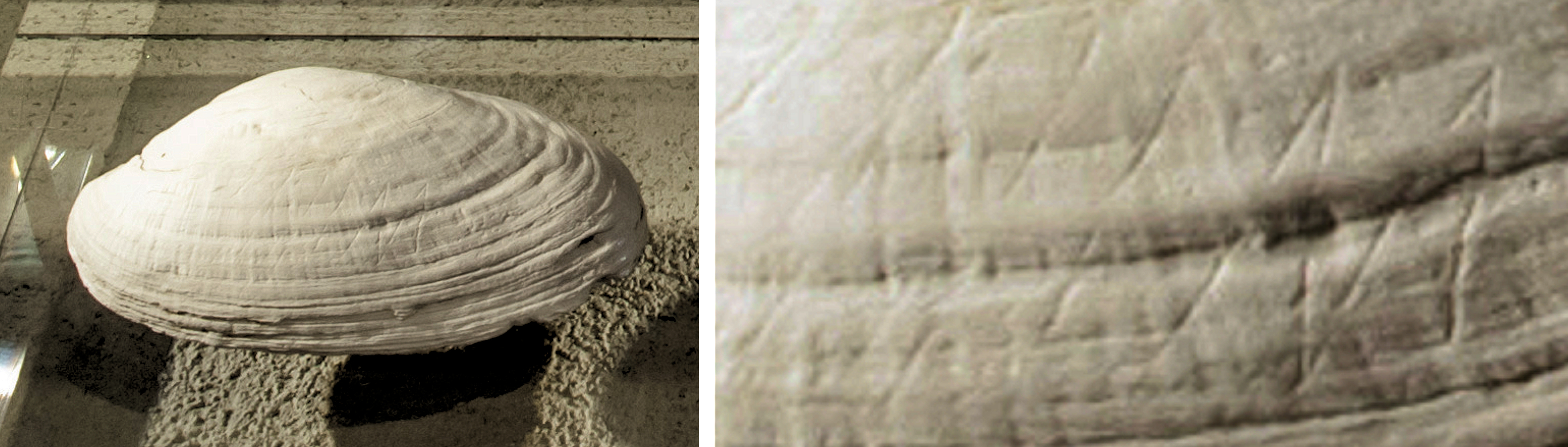
Engraved Pseudodon shell DUB1006-fL from Trinil, Java

Art-making could be evidence of symbolic thinking. An engraved Pseudodon shell DUB1006-fL from Trinil, Java, with geometric markings could possibly be the earliest example of art-making, dating to 436,000 to 546,000 years ago. H. erectus was also the earliest human to collect red-colored pigments, namely ochre. Ochre lumps at Olduvai Gorge, Tanzania, associated with the 1.4 million year old Olduvai Hominid 9 may have been purposefully shaped and trimmed by a hammerstone. Red ochre is normally recognized as bearing symbolic value when associated with modern humans.

=== Language ===
The spinal column of the 1.6 million year old Turkana boy would not have supported properly developed respiratory muscles required to produce speech; and a 1.5 million year old infant H. erectus skull from Mojokerto, Java, shows that this population did not have an extended childhood, which is a prerequisite for language acquisition. On the other hand, despite the cochlear (ear) anatomy of Sangiran 2 and 4 retaining several traits reminiscent of australopithecines, the hearing range may have included the higher frequencies used to discern speech.

Given expanding brain size and technological innovation, H. erectus may have been using some basic proto-language in combination with gesturing, and built the basic framework around which fully-fledged languages would eventually be formed.

== See also ==
- Cro-Magnon
- Behavioral modernity
- Evolution of human intelligence
- Homo naledi
