= Trinil =

Palaeoanthropological site in Java, Indonesia

Coordinates: 7.3743°S 111.3578°E

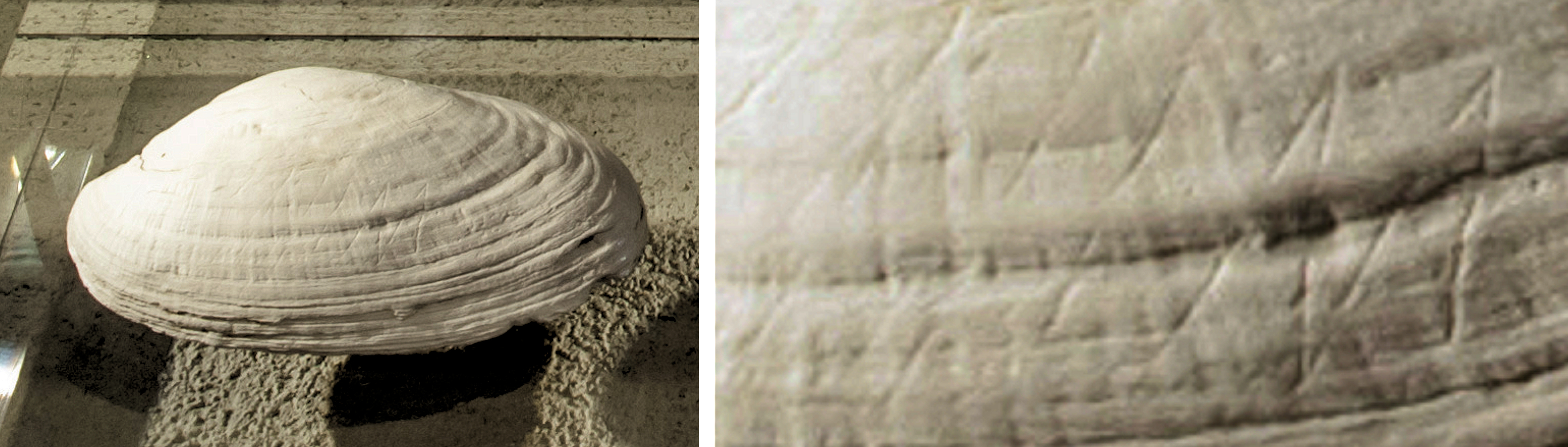
Pseudodon shell DUB1006-fL with the earliest known geometric engravings, supposedly, made by Homo erectus; ca. 500,000 BP; from Trinil (Java); Naturalis Biodiversity Center (Netherlands).

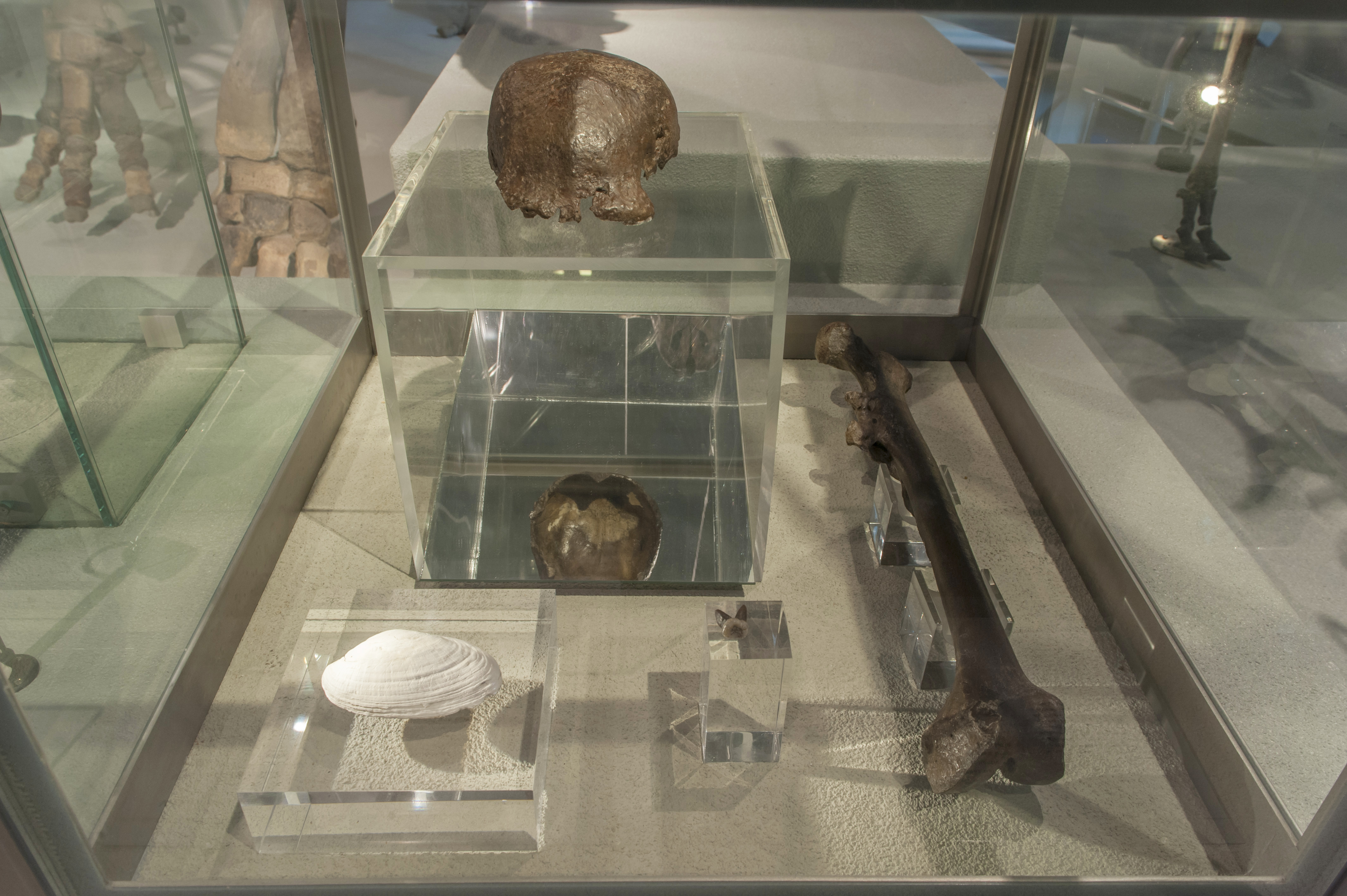
The Homo erectus "Java Man" in the Naturalis Biodiversity Center, Netherlands.

Trinil is a palaeoanthropological site on the banks of the Bengawan Solo in Kedunggalar District, Ngawi, Indonesia. It was at this site in 1891 that the Dutch anatomist Eugène Dubois discovered the first early hominin remains to be found outside of Europe: the famous "Java Man" (Homo erectus erectus) specimen.

Trinil (Indonesia)
