= Ubeidiya, Tiberias =

Former Palestinian village near Tiberias

Al-'Ubaydiyya العبيدية
- Village
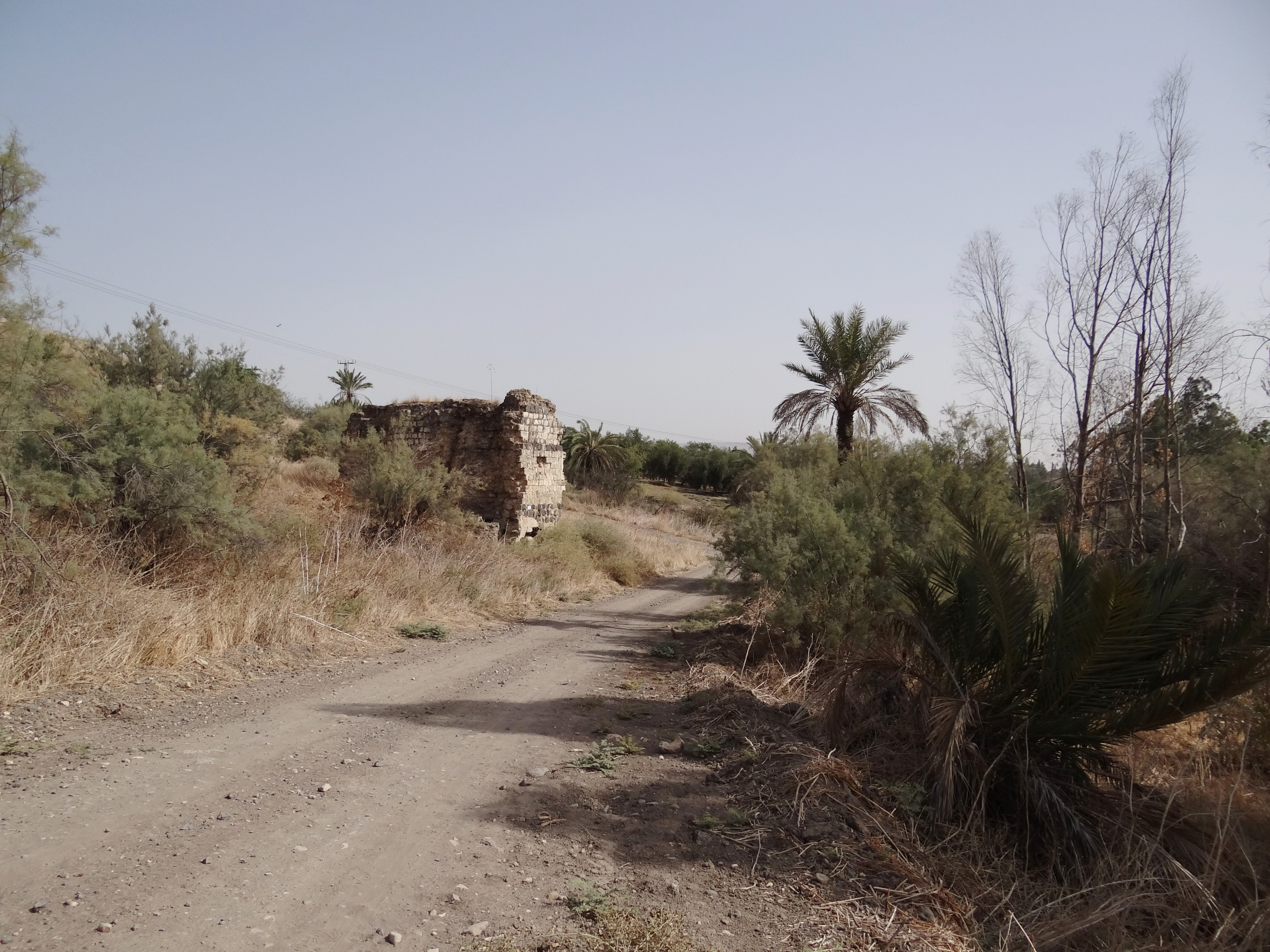
- Remains of a gristmill
- Etymology: From personal name
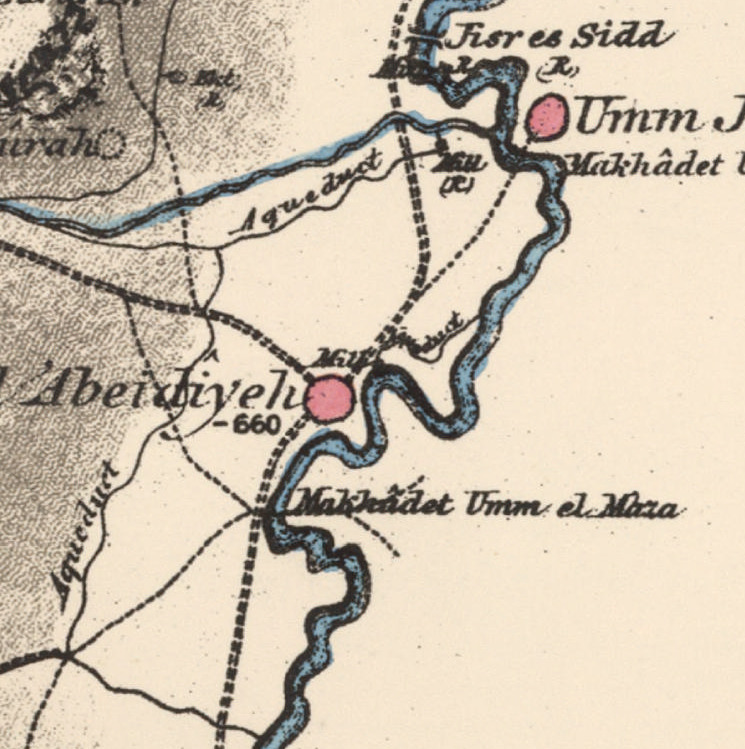
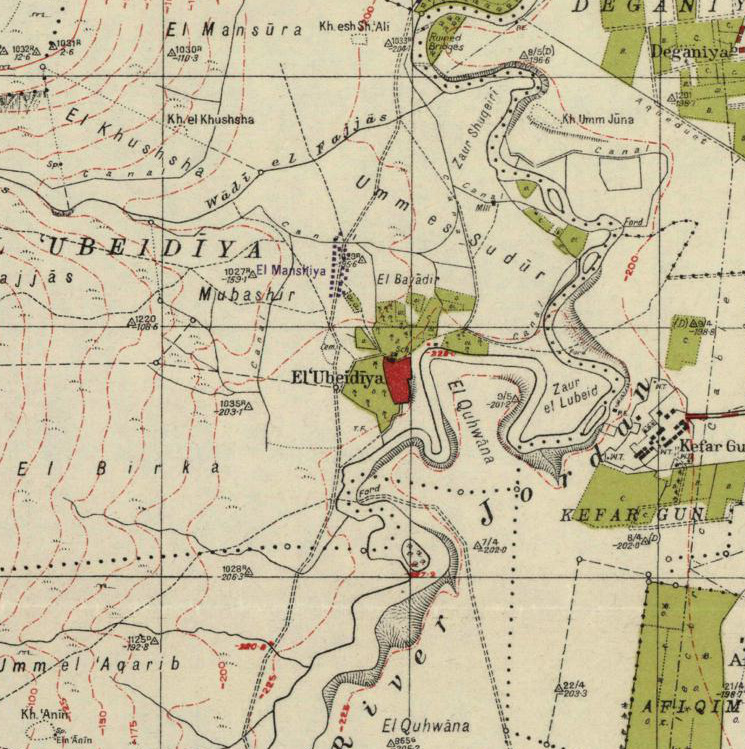
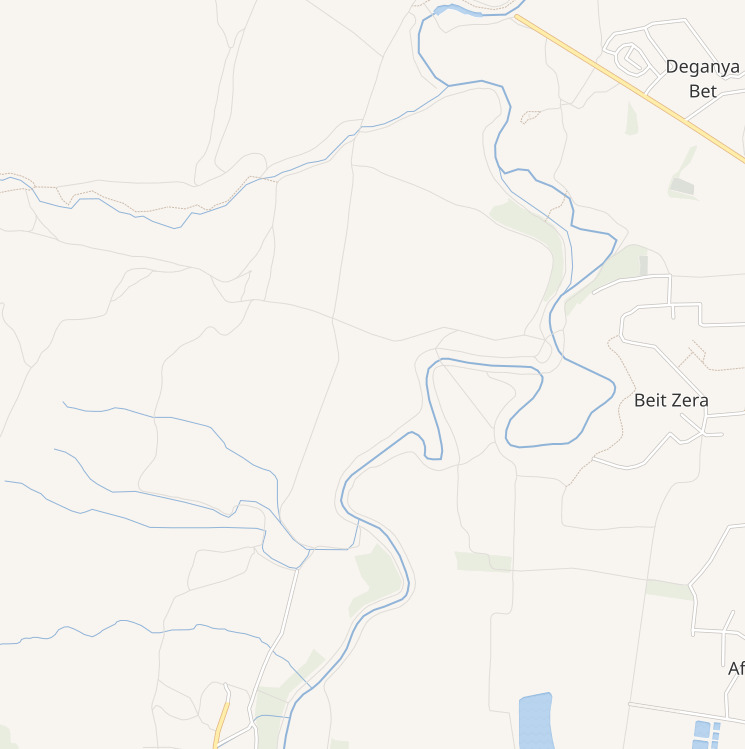
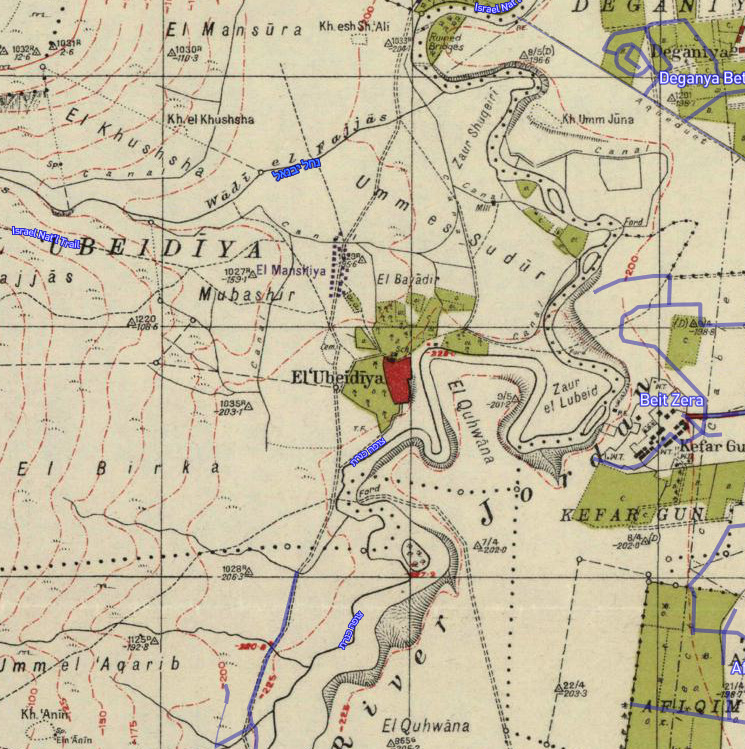
- 1870s map 1940s map modern map 1940s with modern overlay map A series of historical maps of the area around Ubeidiya, Tiberias (click the buttons)

- Location within Mandatory Palestine
- Coordinates: 32°41′21″N 35°33′42″E
- Palestine grid: 202/232
- Geopolitical entity: Mandatory Palestine
- Subdistrict: Tiberias
- Date of depopulation: March 5, 1948

Area
  - Total: 5,173 dunams (5.173 km^{2}; 1.997 sq mi)

Population (1945)
  - Total: 870
- Cause(s) of depopulation: Fear of being caught up in the fighting

Al-'Ubaydiyya (Arabic: العبيدية) was a Palestinian Arab village in the Tiberias Subdistrict. It was depopulated during the 1948 Arab-Israeli War on March 3, 1948. It was located 11 km south of Tiberias, situated close to the Jordan River.

Today the site is a desolate hill named Tel Ubeidiya.

== History ==
=== Ottoman period ===
It was mentioned in the Ottoman defter for the year 1555-6, as Mezraa land, (that is, cultivated land), located in the Nahiya of Tabariyya of the Liwa of Safad. The land was designated as Sahi land, that is, land belonging to the Sultan. Pierre Jacotin called the village Abadieh on his map from 1799.

In 1838 Robinson's Biblical Researches in Palestine noted it as a Muslim village, el-'Öbeidiyeh, in the Tiberias District, located south of lake Tiberias.

In 1881, the PEF's Survey of Western Palestine described El Abeidiyeh: "Stone and mud houses, built on a round tell, close to the Jordan river. It contains about 200 Moslems, and the plain is cultivated. There are several mills in the neighbourhood. There are a few small palms, but not many trees round the village." The PEF wrote that the name comes from Arabic word "Abeed", meaning slave.

A population list from about 1887 showed al Abediyeh to have about 310 inhabitants; all Muslims.

Al-'Ubaydiyya had an elementary school which was founded by the Ottomans.

=== British Mandate ===
At the time of the 1922 census of Palestine conducted by the British Mandate authorities, Al-'Ubaydiyya had a population of 336 Muslims, increasing in the 1931 census to 625 Muslims, in 137 houses.

In 1944/1945, the village had a population of 870 Muslims, with a total of 5,173 dunams of land. Of this, Arabs used 3 dunams for citrus and bananas, 1,014 dunams were irrigated or used for orchards, 1,349 were used for cereals, while 24 dunams were classified as built-up (urban) land.

=== The Nakba ===
In late 1947, following the United Nations’ proposal to partition Palestine, tensions escalated between Jews and Arabs in the Galilee region Tiberias, a mixed city of Jewish and Arab residents, became a flashpoint as violence erupted early in 1948 In April, Jewish Haganah forces attacked Arab neighborhoods in the city, sparking fierce fighting and prompting most Arab residents to flee, aided by British soldiers who evacuated them across the Sea of Galilee to Syria. Afterwards, Tiberias was left almost entirely Jewish, its Arab homes abandoned. Across Galilee, Jewish forces launched military operations to secure territory before the British withdrawal, leading to attacks on Arab villages and widespread fear that caused thousands to flee. The village of Ubeidiya, near Tiberias, was deserted by its inhabitants in April 1948 as news of violence in neighboring towns spread Following this, Ubeidiya was quickly depopulated and its buildings destroyed, with its former residents becoming refugees in surrounding countries, predominantly Syria.

==== Aftermath ====
In 1992 the village site was described thusly: "The remaining section of the walls of the canal (that provided the mill with water) is the most prominent indication of the former existence of the village. Ruins of houses, piles of stones, the bases of walls, terraces, and date palms can be seen on the site. The lands around the site are cultivated mainly in cotton by the Israelis."

== See also ==
- Ubeidiya, prehistoric site near the former village
- Al-Ubaid (disambiguation) for Arabic root of the village name
- Nakba

== Bibliography ==
- Barron, J. B., ed. (1923). Palestine: Report and General Abstracts of the Census of 1922. Government of Palestine.
- Conder, C.R.; Kitchener, H. H. (1881). The Survey of Western Palestine: Memoirs of the Topography, Orography, Hydrography, and Archaeology. Vol. 1. London: Committee of the Palestine Exploration Fund.
- Davis, Rochelle (2011). Palestinian Village Histories: Geographies of the Displaced. Stanford: Stanford University Press. ISBN 978-0-8047-7313-3.
- Department of Statistics (1945). Village Statistics, April, 1945. Government of Palestine.
- Hadawi, S. (1970). Village Statistics of 1945: A Classification of Land and Area ownership in Palestine. Palestine Liberation Organization Research Center. Archived from the original on 2018-12-08.
- Khalidi, W. (1992). All That Remains: The Palestinian Villages Occupied and Depopulated by Israel in 1948. Washington D.C.: Institute for Palestine Studies. ISBN 0-88728-224-5.
- Khalifa, Ahmad Mohammad Ali. 1988. Qaryat al-‘Ubaydiyya [The Village of ‘Ubaydiyya]. Jordan: Mataba‘ al-Jazira.
- Karmon, Y. (1960). "An Analysis of Jacotin's Map of Palestine" (PDF). Israel Exploration Journal. 10 (3, 4): 155–173, 244–253. Archived from the original (PDF) on 2019-12-22.
- Mills, E., ed. (1932). Census of Palestine 1931. Population of Villages, Towns and Administrative Areas. Jerusalem: Government of Palestine.
- Morris, B. (2004). The Birth of the Palestinian Refugee Problem Revisited. Cambridge University Press. ISBN 978-0-521-00967-6.
- Palmer, E. H. (1881). The Survey of Western Palestine: Arabic and English Name Lists Collected During the Survey by Lieutenants Conder and Kitchener, R. E. Transliterated and Explained by E.H. Palmer. Committee of the Palestine Exploration Fund.
- Rhode, H. (1979). Administration and Population of the Sancak of Safed in the Sixteenth Century. Columbia University. Archived from the original on 2020-03-01.
- Robinson, E.; Smith, E. (1841). Biblical Researches in Palestine, Mount Sinai and Arabia Petraea: A Journal of Travels in the year 1838. Vol. 3. Boston: Crocker & Brewster.
- Schumacher, G. (1888). "Population list of the Liwa of Akka". Quarterly Statement - Palestine Exploration Fund. 20: 169–191.
