= Naama Goren-Inbar =

Israeli archaeologist and paleoanthropologist

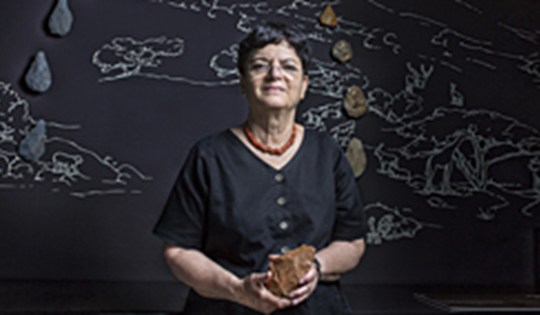
Naama Goren-Inbar

Naama Goren-Inbar (Hebrew: נעמה גורן-ענבר; born July 20, 1948) is an Israeli archaeologist and paleoanthropologist and professor emeritus at the Institute of Archaeology, The Hebrew University of Jerusalem. Goren-Inbar excavated many important prehistoric sites in Israel including the Acheulian site of the Daughters of Jacob Bridge. In 2014, she received the EMET Prize in Humanities and Judaism, and in 2016 was elected to the Israel Academy of Sciences.

== Early life and education ==
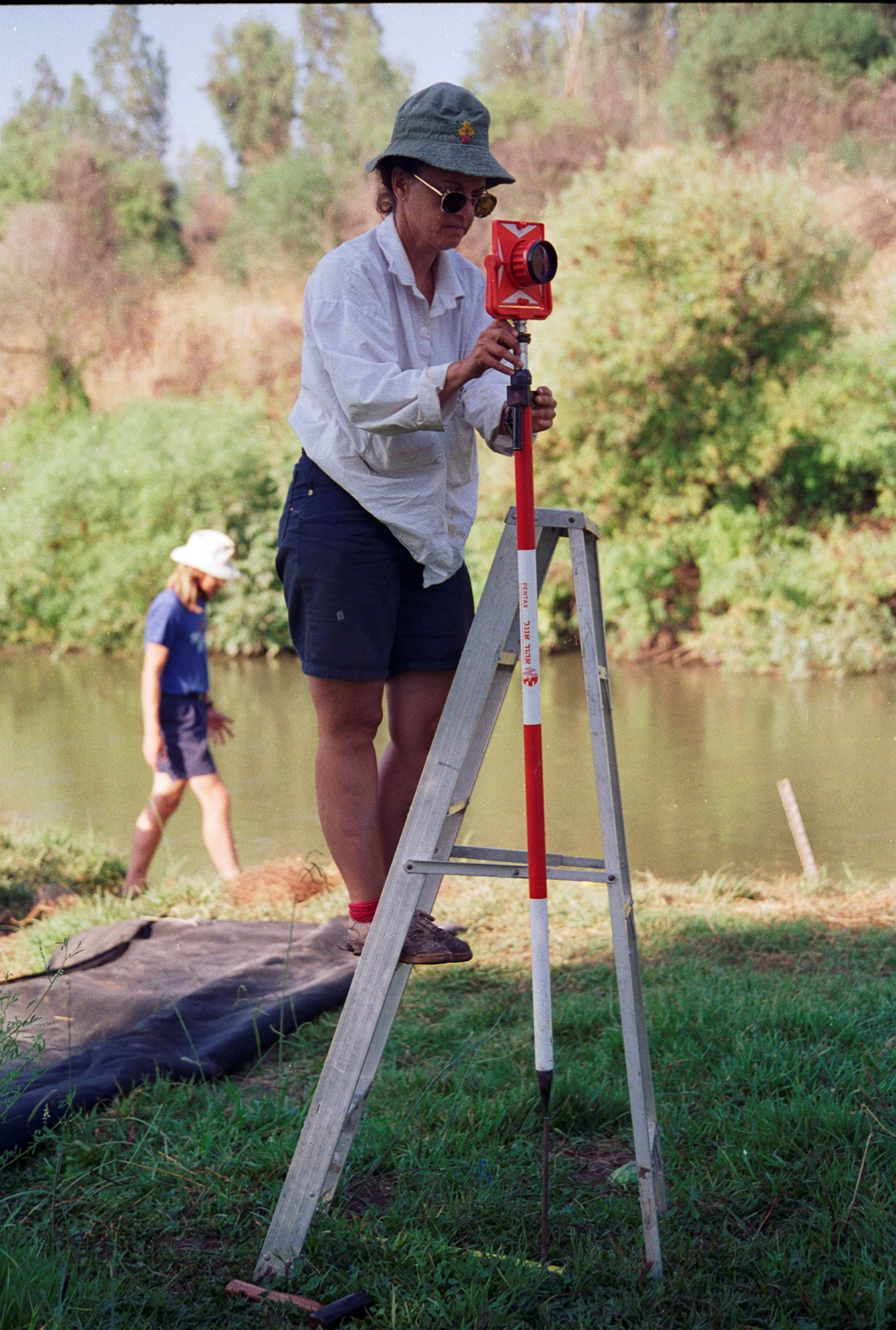
Goren-Inbar excavating the Paleolithic site of GBY

Naama Goren-Inbar was born in Jerusalem in 1948 to Rachel and Yaakov Goren (author). After completing her military service, she began studying toward her first degree in archaeology at the Institute of Archaeology, The Hebrew University of Jerusalem, where she also earned her MA and PhD (1981). Goren-Inbar's PhD dissertation (supervised by Professor Ofer Bar-Yosef) was dedicated to the study of the lithic assemblage of the Acheulian site of ‘Ubeiydia. She completed a post-doctoral fellowship at the University of California, Berkeley under Professor Glynn Isaac. In 1984, Goren-Inbar began teaching at the Hebrew University of Jerusalem. She was appointed associate professor in 1992 and full professor in 1997. From 2002 to 2005, she served as the head of the university's Institute of Archaeology.

== Scientific contributions ==
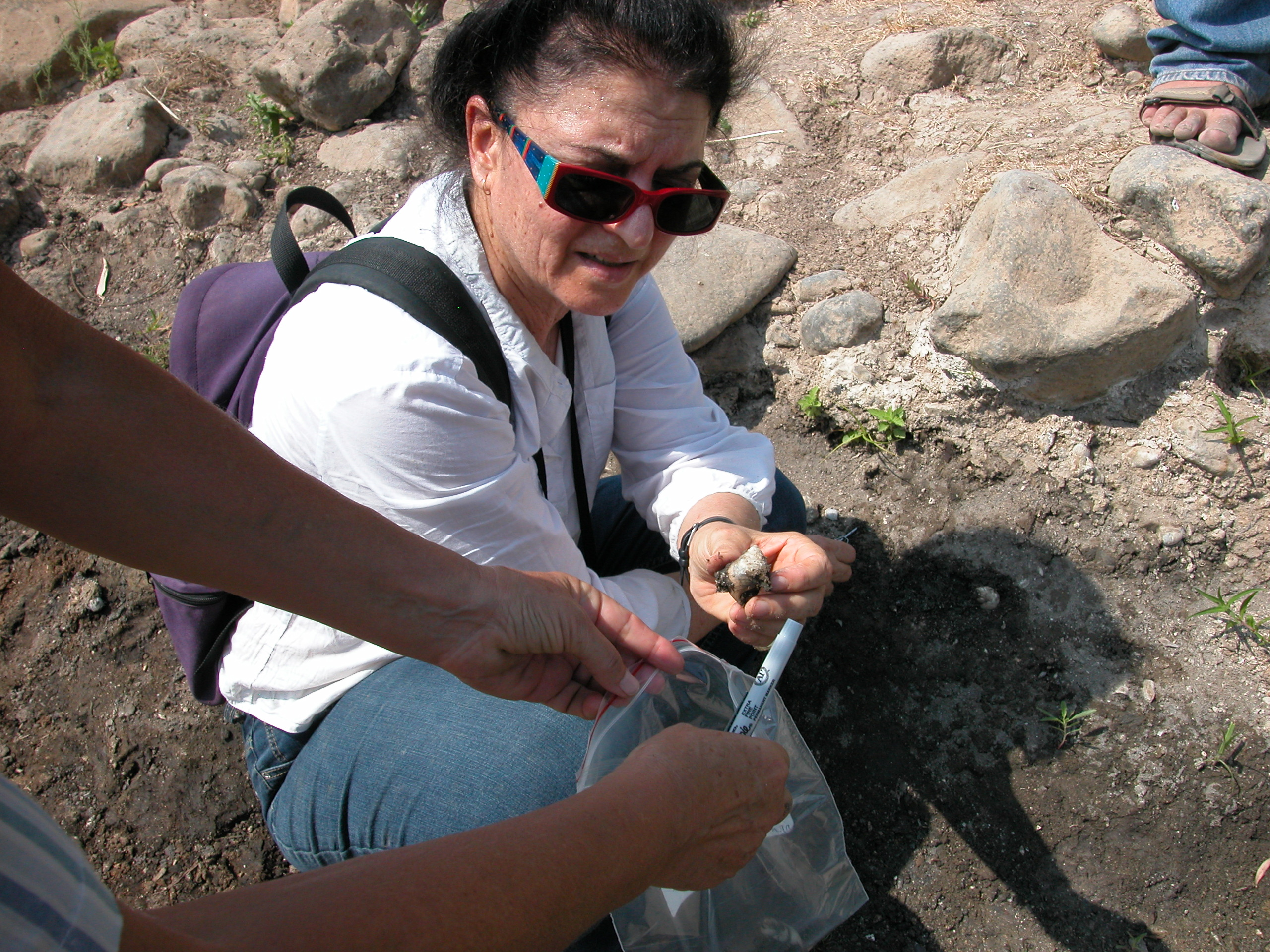
Goren-Inbar collecting samples at GBY

Early in her career, Goren-Inbar participated in excavations at the Lower Paleolithic site of ‘Ubeiydia in the Jordan Valley (the oldest site in Israel), at prehistoric sites in the northern Sinai Desert, at Hayonim Cave in the Galilee, as well as in ethnographic surveys in the southern Sinai Peninsula.

In the late 1970s, Goren-Inbar excavated the Acheulian site of HaLashon near Kfar Menahem. During 1981-1982, she excavated the Acheulian site of Berekhat Ram in the Northern Golan Heights. The archaeological layer of the site, discovered by D. Ben Ami, is stratified between two basalt flows. The lower flow is dated by the Argon/Argon method to 800,000 years before present. The upper flow, sealing the archaeological layer from above, is dated to 233,000 years before present, setting a minimum age for the layers. When excavating, Goren-Inbar exposed the Venus of Berekhat Ram, a tuff pebble figurine of a woman, considered the earliest symbolic representation (art) in human history.

From 1982 to 1985, Goren-Inbar directed the excavation of the Middle Paleolithic site of Quneitra, located in the Northern Golan Heights near the Israeli-Syrian ceasefire line. Excavation at the site, dated to the final stage of the Middle Paleolithic, c. 55,000 before present, exposed a rich lithic assemblage accompanied by a wealth of animal bones including giant bovids. A notable find is a flint cobble on which a pattern of concentric circles was carved, one of the earliest and rarest examples for Middle Paleolithic art in the Levant.

In 1989, Goren-Inbar initiated her excavation project at the Acheulian site of Gesher Benot Ya'aqov (GBY), located on the banks of the Jordan River south of the Hula Valley. The site, excavated during seven seasons from 1989 to 1997, is dated to 780,000 years before present by the presence in its layer of the last paleo-magnetic reversal. The primary finds at GBY include a butchered, straight tusk elephant, indicating the early hominins’ ability to process large game. In addition, a minimum of seven fallow deer carcasses exposed in a single layer of GBY Area C evidence the large game hunting of numerous animals. The cut marks made on the bones by the flint knives of the site's butchers demonstrate that they used a butchering method similar to that of modern humans. A rich and unique assemblage of bifacial tools (handaxes and cleavers) suggest an African origin for the stone tool tradition of the site's knappers. The tools were shaped from basalt, flint, and limestone, evidence of the high cognitive abilities of the inhabitants of GBY. The site's findings also include the earliest evidence for systematic, controlled use of fire outside of Africa.

The sediments of the site have been waterlogged since their accumulation, creating anaerobic conditions enabling the exceptional preservation of botanical remains, including pollen, seeds, fruits, and wood. Analysis of these remains led to a unique reconstruction of the nearly one million year-old environment on the banks of the Paleo-Hula Lake. Among the botanic remains are seven species of edible nuts. Excavation at GBY exposed pitted stones identified as pitted anvils or nutting stones, ancient nut crackers. This is the earliest evidence for a vegetarian component of the human diet.

Goren-Inbar's excavation and research is published in hundreds of papers and in a series of books. She established the importance of GBY as a milestone in the study of human evolution during the Acheulian. Goren-Inbar's study of Early Paleolithic diet, migration out-of-Africa, lithic technology and tradition, and reconstruction of the paleoenvironment has placed her as a leading authority on early human behavior and evolution. Her primary contribution is in establishing the presence of sophisticated technology, modern behavior, and advanced cognitive abilities within the framework of the early Paleolithic, pushing the chronology of such phenomena hundreds of thousands of years back in time.

== Selected publications ==
=== Books in the Gesher Benot Ya’aqov Series ===
- Goren-Inbar, N., Werker, E. & Feibel, C.S. 2002. The Acheulian Site of Gesher Benot Ya'aqov, Israel Volume I: The Wood Assemblage. Oxford: Oxbow Books.
- Alperson-Afil, N. & Goren-Inbar, N. 2010. The Acheulian Site of Gesher Benot Ya'aqov Vol. II: Ancient Flames and Controlled Use of Fire. Vertebrate Paleobiology and Paleoanthropology. Dordrecht: Springer.
- Rabinovich, R., Gaudzinski-Windheuser, S., Kindler, L. & Goren-Inbar, N. 2012. The Acheulian Site of Gesher Benot Ya'aqov Volume III: Mammalian Taphonomy. The Assemblages of Layers V-5 and V-6. Vertebrate Paleobiology and Paleoanthropology. Dordrecht: Springer.
- Goren-Inbar, N., Alperson-Afil, N., Sharon, G. & Herzlinger, G. 2018. The Acheulian site of Gesher Benot Ya'aqov. Volume IV. The Lithic Assemblage. Vertebrate Paleobiology and Paleoanthropology Series. Cham, Switzerland: Springer.

=== Excavation reports ===
- Bar-Yosef, O. & Goren-Inbar, N. 1993. The lithic assemblages of 'Ubeidiya: A lower Paleolithic site in the Jordan Valley. Qedem - Monographs of the Institute of Archaeology N. 34. Jerusalem: Institute of Archaeology, Hebrew University of Jerusalem.
- Goren-Inbar, N. 1990. Quneitra: A Mousterian Site on the Golan Heights. Qedem - Monographs of the Institute of Archaeology N.31. Jerusalem: The Hebrew University of Jerusalem.

=== Edited books ===
- Goren-Inbar, N. & Speth, J.D. (eds.) 2004. Human Paleoecology in the Levantine Corridor. Oxford: Oxbow Books.
- Goren-Inbar, N. & Sharon, G. (eds.) 2006. Axe Age: Acheulian Tool-making from Quarry to Discard. London: Equinox.
- Goren-Inbar, N. & Spiro, B. 2011. Special Issue: Early-Middle Pleistocene palaeoenvironments in the Levant. Journal of Human Evolution 60.

=== Selected papers ===
- Alperson-Afil, N., Sharon, G., Kislev, M., Melamed, Y., Zohar, I., Ashkenazi, S., Rabinovich, R., Biton, R., Werker, E., Hartman, G., Feibel, C. & Goren-Inbar, N. 2009. Spatial organization of hominin activities at Gesher Benot Ya'aqov, Israel. Science 326: 1677–1680.
- Belitzky, S., Goren-Inbar, N. & Werkerz, E. 1991. Wooden plank with a Middle Pleistocene man-made polish. Journal of Human Evolution.
- Goren-Inbar, N. 2011. Culture and cognition in the Acheulian industry: A case study from Gesher Benot Yaʿaqov. Philosophical Transactions of the Royal Society B: Biological Sciences 366: 1038–1049.
- Goren-Inbar, N., Alperson, N., Kislev, M.E., Simchoni, O., Melamed, Y., Ben-Nun, A. & Werker, E. 2004. Evidence of Hominin Control of Fire at Gesher Benot Ya`aqov, Israel. Science 304: 725–727.
- Goren-Inbar, N., Feibel, C.S., Verosub, K.L., Melamed, Y., Kislev, M.E., Tchernov, E. & SaragustI, I. 2000. Pleistocene milestones on the Out-of-Africa corridor at Gesher Benot Ya'aqov, Israel. Science 289: 944–947.
- Goren-Inbar, N., Lister, A., Werker, E. & Chech, M. 1994. A butchered elephant skull and associated artifacts from the Acheulian site of Gesher Benot Ya'aqov, Israel. Paléorient 20: 99–112.
- Goren-Inbar, N. & Saragusti, I. 1996. An Acheulian biface assemblage from the site of Gesher Benot Ya'aqov, Israel: Indications of African Affinities. Journal of Field Archaeology 23: 15–30.
- Goren-Inbar, N., Sharon, G., Melamed, Y. & Kislev, M. 2002. Nuts, nut cracking, and pitted stones at Gesher Benot Ya'aqov, Israel. Proceedings of the National Academy of Sciences of the United States of America 99: 2455–60.
