= Ubeidiya prehistoric site =

Prehistoric site in the Jordan Valley

Ubeidiya
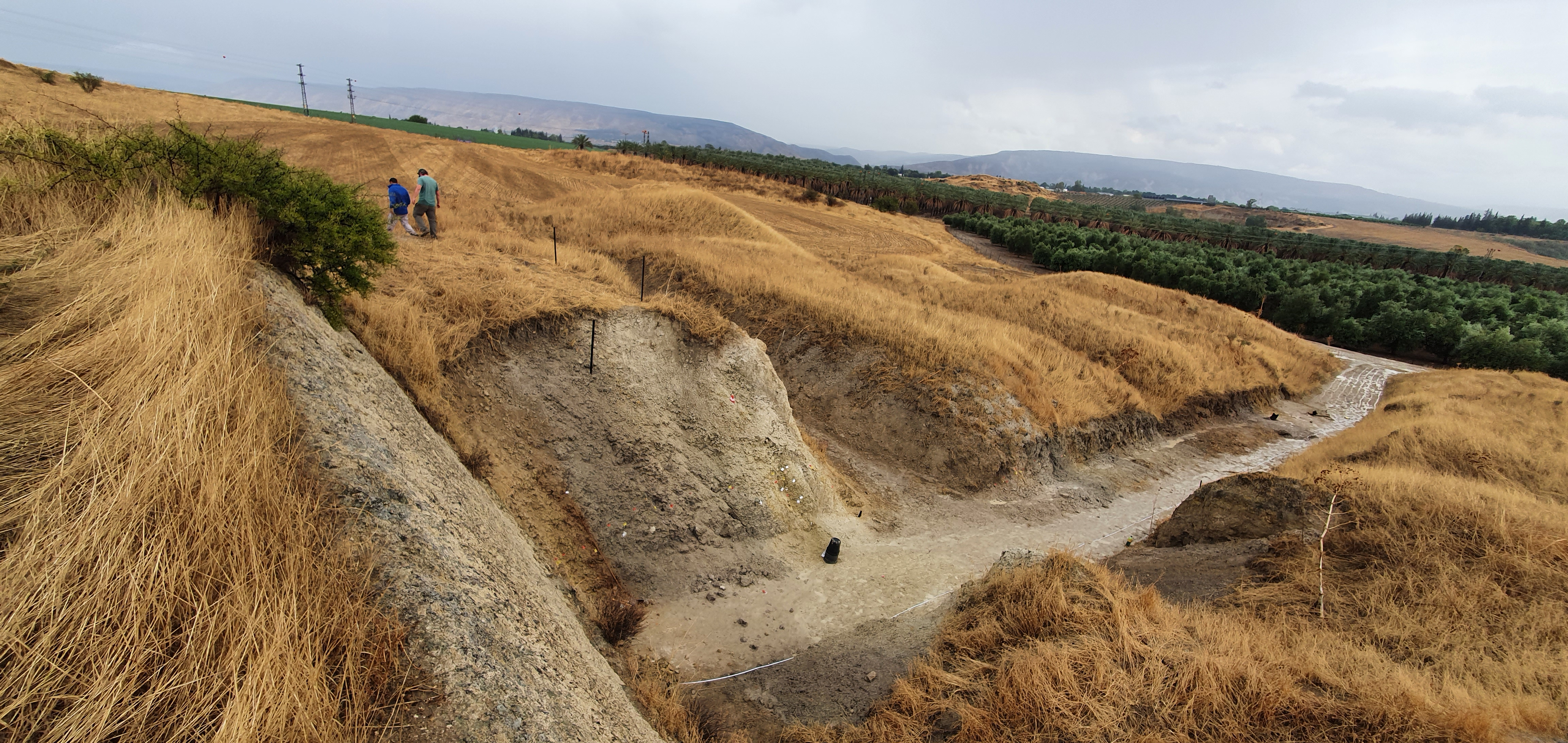

- Location within Northeast Israel
- 32°41′19″N 35°33′43″E
- Periods: Pleistocene
- Cultures: Oldowan; Acheulean
- Location: Emek HaYarden Regional Council, Israel
- Region: Jordan Valley, Jordan Rift Valley

Site notes
- Archaeologists: Moshe Stekelis, Georg Haas (paleontologist), Ofer Bar-Yosef, Naama Goren-Inbar; geologists Leo Picard and Nachman Shulman
- Public access: Yes

Ubeidiya (Levantine Arabic: العبيدية, romanized: ʿUbeydiyye; Hebrew: עובידיה, romanized: Uvediya), some 3 km south of the Sea of Galilee, in the Jordan Rift Valley, Israel, is an archaeological site of the early Pleistocene, c. 1.5 million years ago, preserving traces of one of the earliest migrations of Homo erectus out of Africa, with (as of 2014) only the site of Dmanisi in Georgia being older. The site yielded hand axes of the Acheulean type, but very few human remains. The animal remains include a hippopotamus' femur bone, and an immensely large pair of horns belonging to a species of extinct bovid. The site was discovered in 1959 and was first excavated between 1960 and 1974.

== Etymology ==
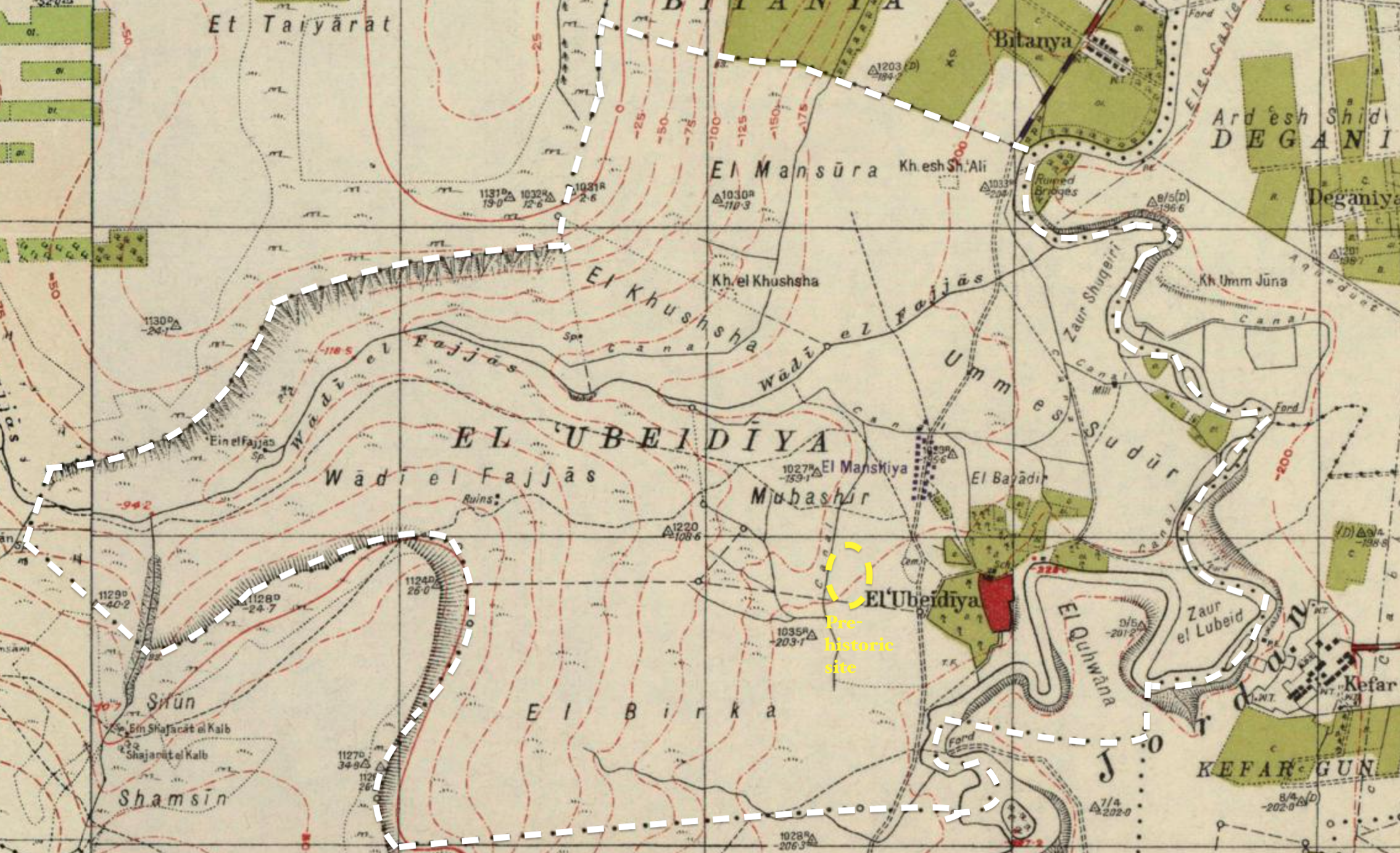
1940s Survey of Palestine map showing the location of the historic village site (today known as Tell Ubeidiya) and the prehistoric site discovered in 1959.

The prehistoric site is named for Ubeidiya, Tiberias, which was centered on Tell 'Ubeidiya but depopulated during the 1947–1949 Palestine war.

The name Ubeidiya may be derived from the biblical name Obadiah; it appears on the surface to be a adjectival form of a diminutive of South Levantine Arabic abeed "slave." Abeed is the Arabic word for slave.

== Location ==
Ubeidiya is located between the village Menahemia and Kibbutz Beit Zera, one kilometer northwest of the latter.

The prehistoric remains were found at a site distinct from the archaeological mound (tell) known as Tell 'Ubeidiya, some 400 metres northwest of the tell.

== Excavation history ==
The prehistoric site was discovered in May 1959 near the tell, south of the wadi Yavne'el/Fijjās, by a member of the kibbutz Afikim who was levelling the ground for agriculture with a bulldozer. Excavations at the site began in 1960, led by Moshe Stekelis, assisted by zoologist Georg Haas, geologists Leo Picard and Nachman Shulman and several archaeology students, including Ofer Bar-Yosef and Naama Goren-Inbar. After Stekelis died in 1967, Bar-Yosef and Goren-Inbar conducted the excavations.

== Findings ==
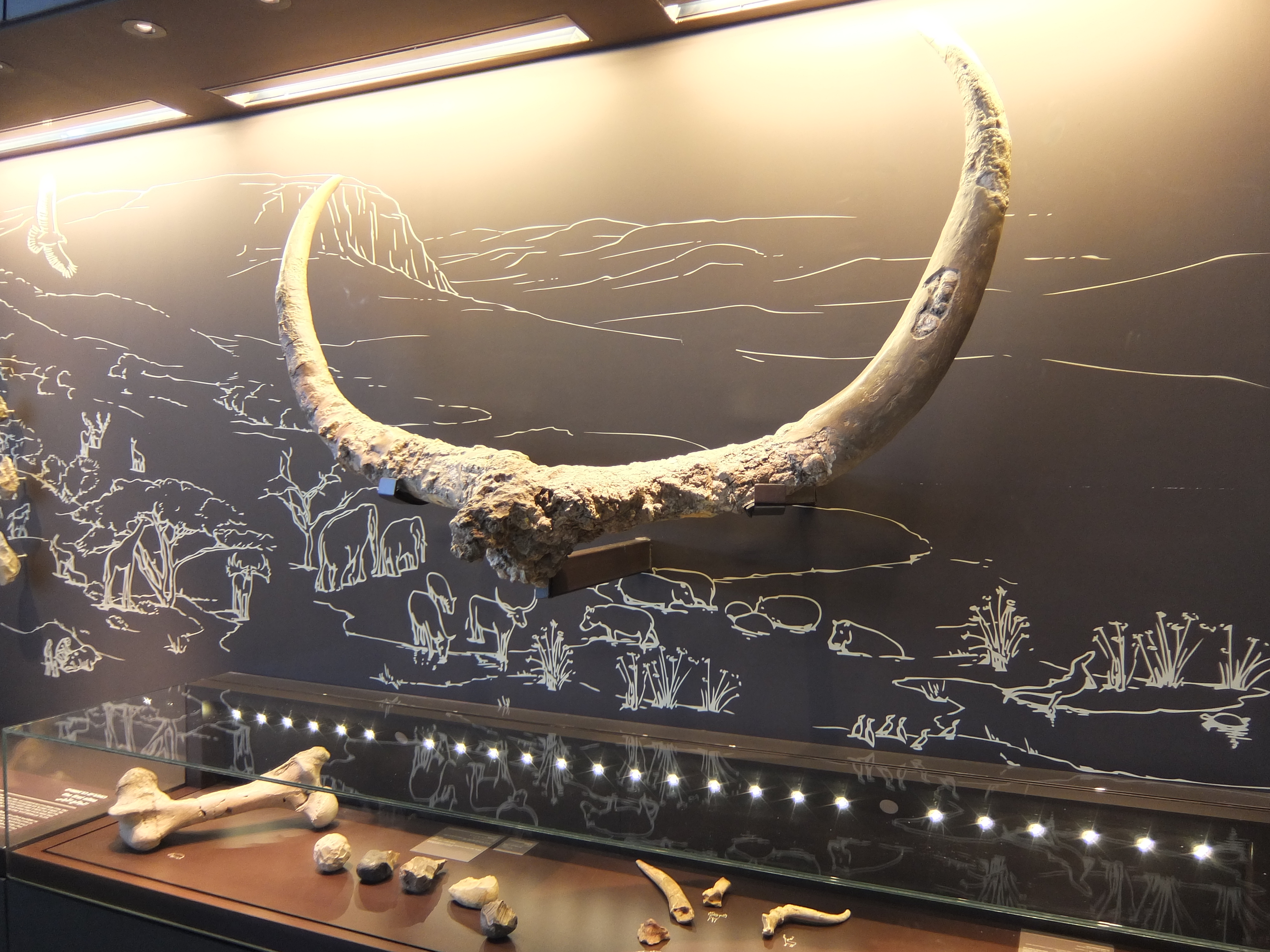
Large horns from a species of extinct bovid (Israel Museum)

Prehistoric human remains starting from about 1.7 Mya (million years ago), more recently redated biochronologically to 1.5 Mya, were discovered in the excavations, within about 60 layers of soil within which were found human bones and remains of ancient animals. These include some of the oldest human remains outside Africa and more than 10,000 ancient stone tools.

Today, the findings are preserved in the Israel Museum in Jerusalem.

=== Human skeletal remains ===
In February 2022, archaeologists from the Israel Antiquities Authority, led by Professor Ella Been, announced the discovery of a 1.5-million-year-old complete hominin vertebra. According to the researchers, the fossilized bone belonging to a juvenile between the ages of 6-12 is the oldest evidence of ancient hominins in the Middle East. This latest discovery has shed new light on the story of early human migrations. The size and shape of the lower lumbar vertebra, dated to the Early Pleistocene, indicates that it belonged to an individual from a different species than the one represented by the 1.8-million-year-old Dmanisi hominins from Georgia. After this discovery, Omry Barzilai assumed that different human species produced the stone tool industries present at Ubeidiya and Dmanisi, respectively. The Ubeidiya child was an estimated 155 cm tall at death, its predicted adult size being, in the conservative estimation of Prof. Ella Been, of more than 1.8 metres tall. Regarding the species the hominin child belonged to, the authors of the paper published in the Scientific Reports journal are adopting there the cautious attitude of declaring it as "comparable to other early Pleistocene large-bodied hominins from Africa", but due to a lack of information about its morphology beyond what can be gleaned from a vertebra, they are declining to identify its species other than it being too large to belong to H. habilis. In an interview with the Israeli newspaper Haaretz, however, Dr. Alon Barash, a palaeoanthropologist, quite categorically declares it to be a H. erectus.

Other hominin skeletal material from Ubeidiya previously studied consists of a molar, a further minor finding, and a highly worn right lateral lower incisor. The analysis of the more recently discovered incisor identified the hominin species to which it belongs as one of the three extant during the Lower Pleistocene, but could not securely distinguish to which of them: Homo habilis, H. ergaster, or H. erectus. The age of the deposits and the location within the Levantine corridor indirectly suggest it belonging to a H. ergaster hominin.

UB 10749 was similar to the East African KNM WT 15000 of (Nariocotome III), KNM-ER 736 and KNM-ER 1808 from Koobi Fora and MK3 (IB7594) from Gombore in the Melka Kunture area (Ethiopia).

=== Habitation remains and environment ===
The site also features rock surfaces in which the prehistoric man lived during the Pleistocene period. As a result of geologic breakage and foldage activity, the rock surfaces are now inclined at an angle of 70 degrees. It is thought that the area used to feature a pristine lake along which Homo erectus lived after his exodus from Africa. The finds discovered at the site validate this theory.

Archaeologists found bones of animal species that went extinct altogether, such as sabre-toothed cats, mammoths and giant buffalo, as well of species still surviving elsewhere in the world, such as baboons, warthogs, hippopotamuses, giraffes and jaguars.

In a new study, a team from the Hebrew University in Jerusalem set out to establish an absolute chronology for Ubeidiya using three different dating methods, including cosmogenic isotope burial dating in which the soil was examined for rare isotopes created when cosmic rays strike quartz crystals in the sediments. According to their findings, the formation of the Ubeidiya site took place between 1.93 and 2.13 million years ago.

== Tell 'Ubeidiya ==
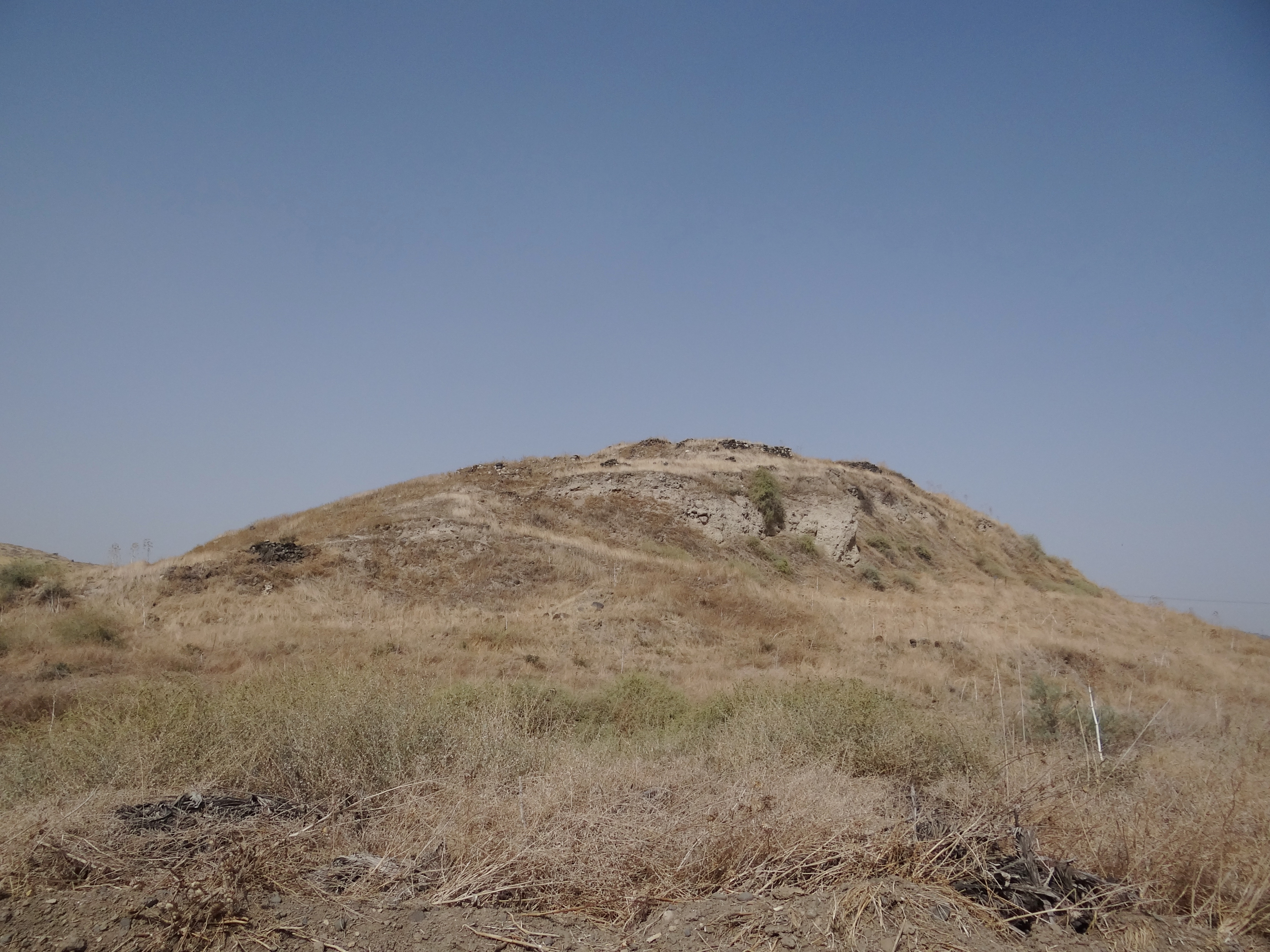
Tell 'Ubeidiya, a nearby archaeological mound

Ruins of the Arab village of Ubeidiya, Tiberias.

On the mound once stood a walled city which controlled the crossroads of the Jordan Valley and the road linking the Golan Heights to the port of Acco. Tell Ubeidiya is considered as one of the possible candidates for the Bronze Age city of Yenoam, known from Egyptian sources, but this is a matter of speculation.

A 2012 trial excavation along the western fringes of the tell uncovered remains from the Early and Late Bronze, Iron, Persian, Roman, Byzantine, Early Islamic, Crusader, Mamluk and Ottoman periods.

== See also ==
- Prehistory of the Levant
