= Cave of Maltravieso =

Cave and archaeological site in Spain

Coordinates: 39°27′27″N 6°22′15″W

Map of the Cave of Maltravieso

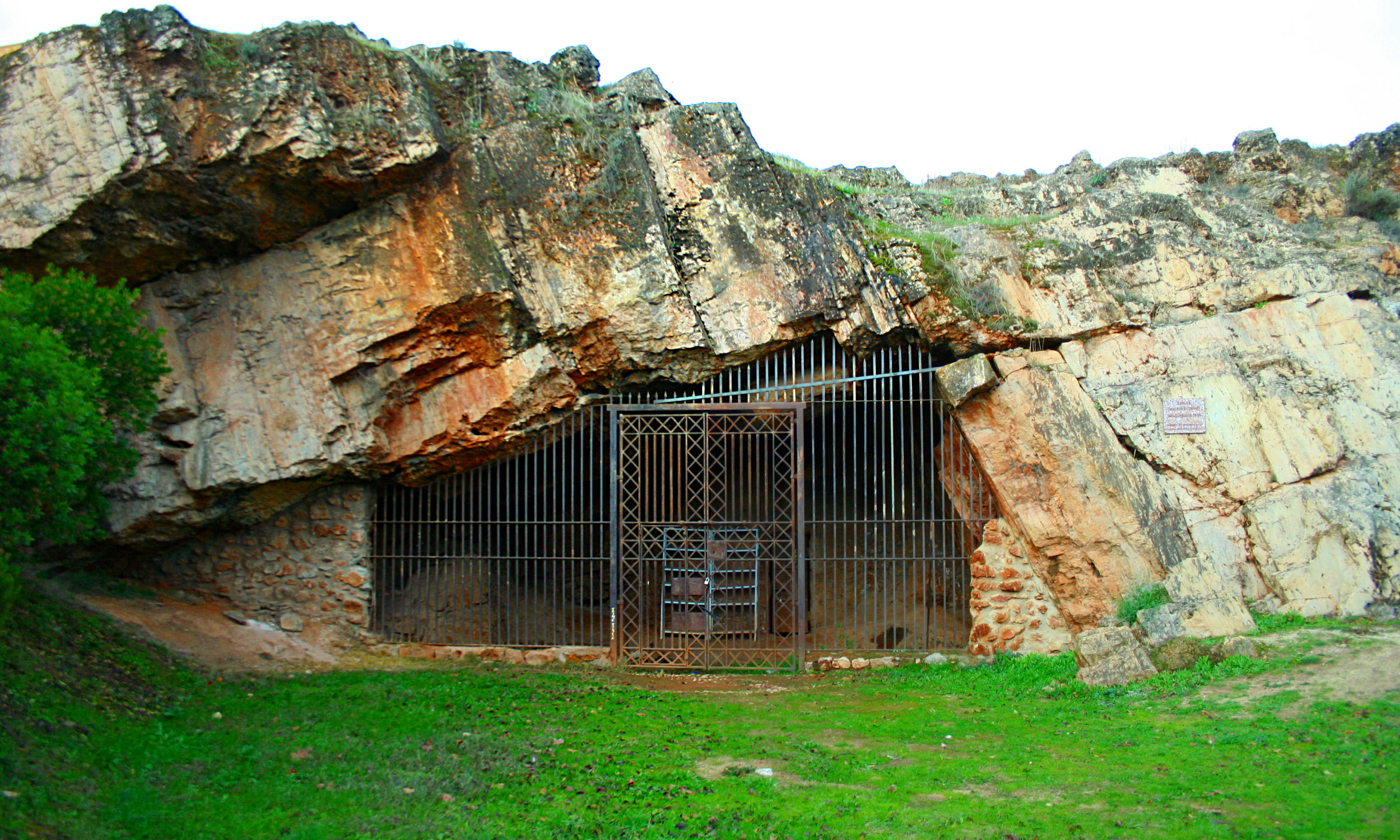
Entrance to the cave

The Cave of Maltravieso in Cáceres, Extremadura, Spain, was discovered in 1951. It shows traces of human occupation from the Middle Paleolithic. It contains cave art, most notably a total of 71 hand stencils, enumerated in the 1990s using ultraviolet photography, but also linear designs and some animal paintings. In a 2018 study based on uranium–thorium dating, a hand stencil from the Cave of Maltravieso was dated to 64,000 years ago. This would make it Middle Paleolithic art, predating the presence of European early modern humans, with important implications for Neanderthal behavior. This dating, and the possibility of Neanderthal cave art, is disputed on the physical-chemical evidence.

A visitor center, the Centro de interpretación de la Cueva de Maltravieso, opened in 1999. Other nearby Paleolithic caves are those of El Conejar, Santa Ana and Castañar de Ibor.
