= Mask of la Roche-Cotard =

Flint artifact

Coordinates: 47°20′12″N 0°25′34″E

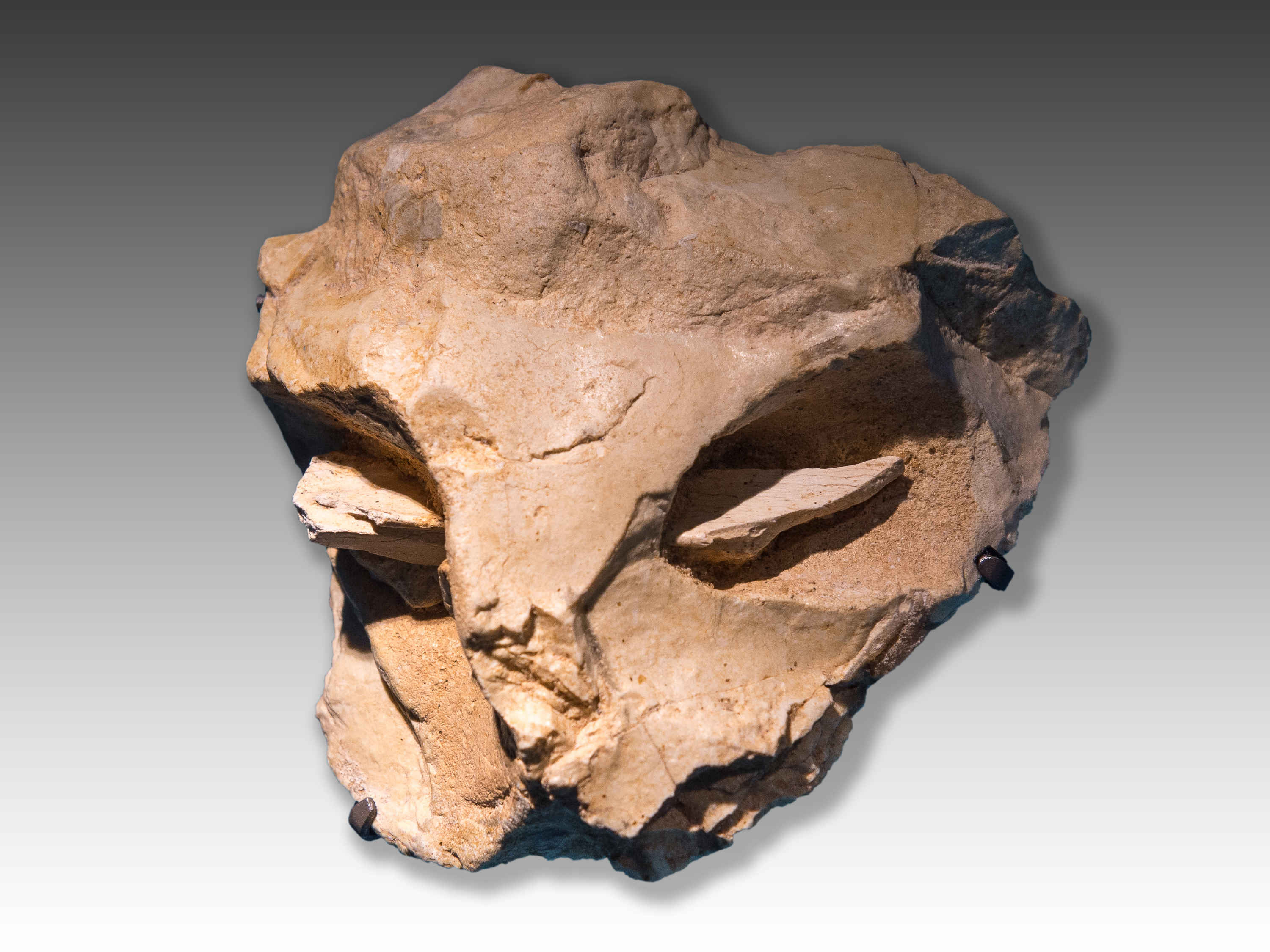
Mask of la Roche-Cotard

The Mask of la Roche-Cotard, also known as the "Mousterian Protofigurine", is an artifact dated to around 75,000 years ago, in the Mousterian period. It was found in 1975 in the entrance of a cave named La Roche-Cotard, territory of the commune of Langeais (Indre-et-Loire), on the banks of the river Loire.

The artifact, possibly created by Neanderthal humans, is a piece of flat flint that has been shaped in a way that seems to resemble the upper part of a face. A piece of bone pushed through a hole in the stone has been interpreted as a representation of eyes. Paul Bahn has suggested this "mask" is "highly inconvenient", as "It makes a nonsense of the view that clueless Neanderthals could only copy their cultural superiors the Cro-Magnons". Though this may represent an example of artistic expression in Neanderthal humans, some archaeologists question whether the artifact represents a face, and some suggest that it may be practical rather than artistic.

In 2023 the oldest known Neanderthal engravings were found in La Roche-Cotard cave which have been dated to more than 57,000 years ago.

== See also ==
- Art of the Middle Paleolithic
