= Art of the Middle Paleolithic =

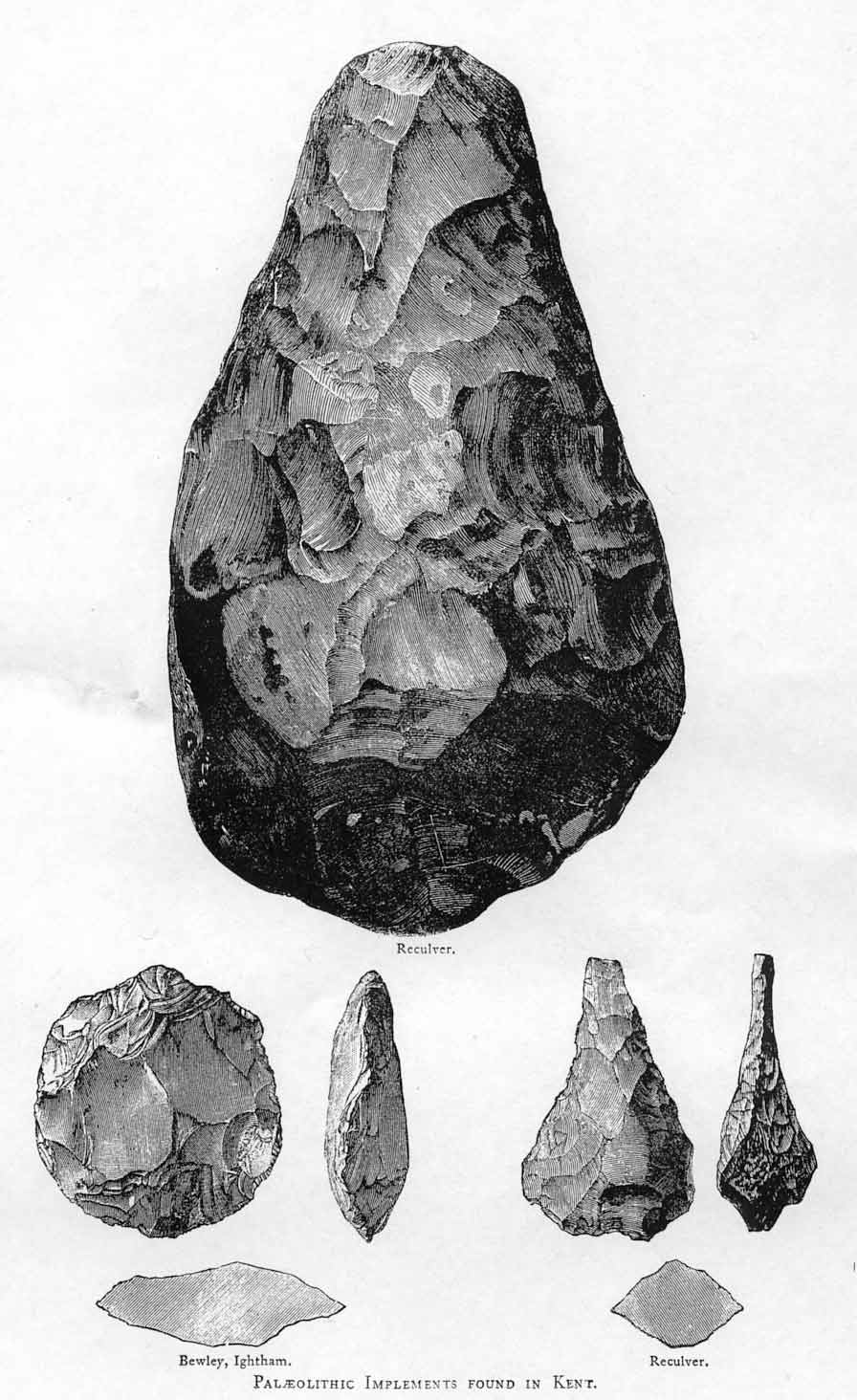
Acheulean hand-axes from Kent. The types shown are (clockwise from top) cordate, ficron and ovate. Arguably a form of early art.

The oldest undisputed examples of figurative art are known from Europe and from Sulawesi, Indonesia, and are dated as far back as around 50,000 years ago (Art of the Upper Paleolithic). Together with religion and other cultural universals of contemporary human societies, the emergence of figurative art is a necessary attribute of full behavioral modernity.

There are, however, some examples of non-figurative designs which somewhat predate the Upper Paleolithic, beginning about 70,000 years ago (MIS 4). These include the earliest of the Iberian cave paintings, including a hand stencil at the Cave of Maltravieso, a simple linear design, and red paint applied to speleothems, dated to at least 64,000 years ago and as such attributable to Neanderthals. The markings on the walls of a cave in La Roche-Cotard in the Loire valley have been identified as the oldest known Neanderthal engravings and have been dated to more than 57,000 years ago. Similarly, the Blombos Cave of South Africa yielded some stones with engraved grid or cross-hatch patterns, dated to some 73,000 years ago, but they are attributed to Homo sapiens.

== Europe ==
Proposed Neanderthal art

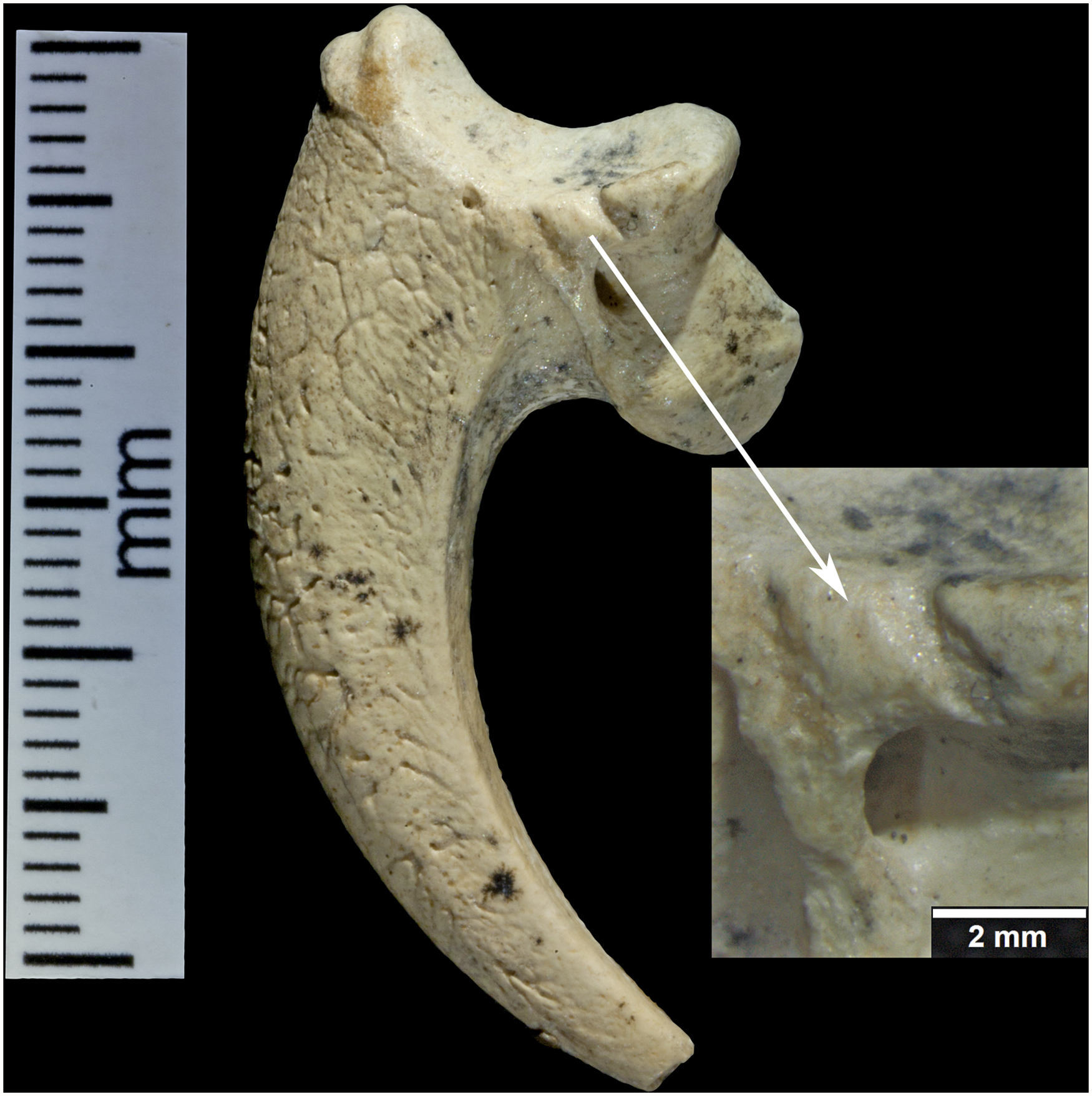
Proposed Neanderthal jewelry: white-tailed eagle claw with striations at the Neanderthal site of Krapina, Croatia, circa 130,000 BP.

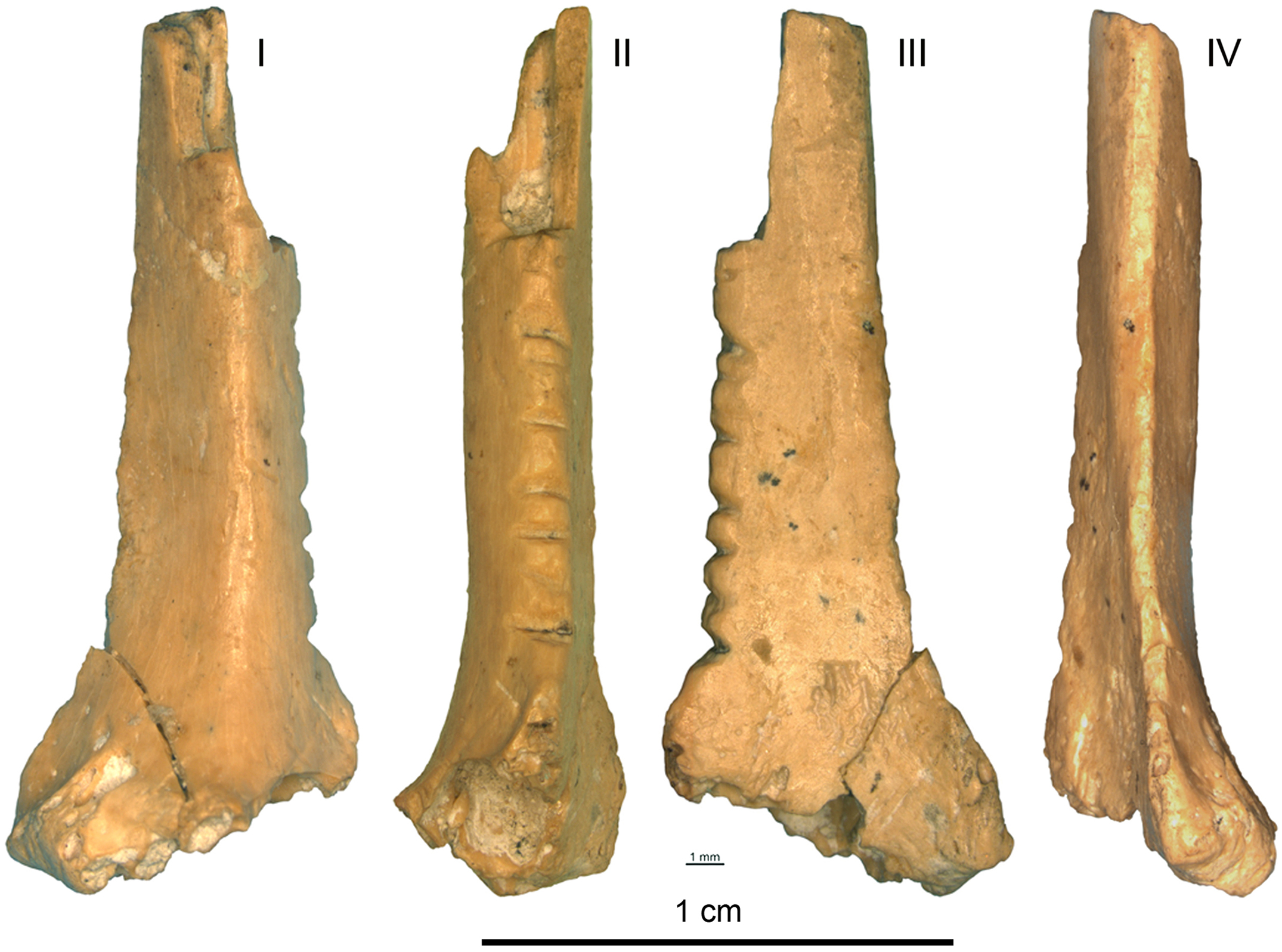
Proposed Neanderthal work of art with symbolism: incision-decorated raven bone from the Zaskalnaya VI (Kolosovskaya) Neanderthal site, Crimea, Micoquian industry dated to between cal. 43,000 and 38,000 BP.

The 130,000-year-old eagle claws found in Krapina, Croatia, have been viewed by some anthropologists as an example of Neanderthal art. Some have suggested that Neanderthals may have copied this behavior from Homo sapiens. But David W. Frayer has disputed this view, saying that Homo sapiens were not in the region where claws were discovered even after 100,000 years.

In Spain, Uranium-thorium dating of painted designs in the caves of La Pasiega (Cantabria), a hand stencil in Maltravieso (Extremadura), and red-painted speleothems in Ardales (Andalusia) yielded an age of more than 64,800 years, predating the previously oldest known art by at least 20,000 years. In July 2021, scientists reported the discovery of a bone carving, one of the world's oldest works of art, made by Neanderthals about 51,000 years ago.

The Mask of La Roche-Cotard has also been argued as being evidence of Neanderthal figurative art, although in a period post-dating their contact with Homo sapiens. The "Divje Babe flute" had controversially been claimed as a Neanderthal musical instrument, though many researchers believe that its holes are most likely the bite marks of carnivores.

== Southern Africa ==
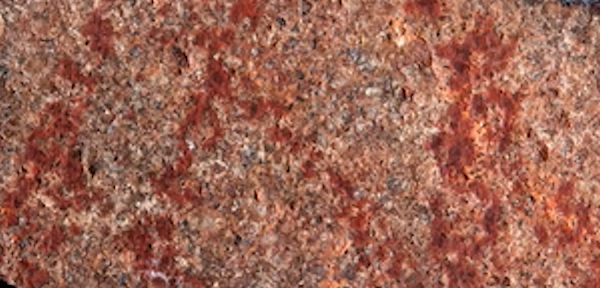
The "abstract drawing" (ochre cross-hatching) discovered in Blombos Cave in South Africa, ca. 73,000 years old.

In 2002 in Blombos cave, situated in South Africa, ochre stones were discovered engraved with grid or cross-hatch patterns, dated to some 70,000 years ago. This suggested to some researchers that early Homo sapiens were capable of abstraction and production of abstract art or symbolic art. Also discovered at the Blombos cave were shell beads, also dating to c. 70,000 years ago. Engraved ochre has also been reported from other Middle Stone Age sites, such as Klein Kliphuis, Wonderwerk Cave and Klasies River Cave 1. Arguably, these engraved pieces of ochre represent – together with the engraved ostrich egg shells from Diepkloof – the earliest forms of abstract representation and conventional design tradition hitherto recorded. The interpretation of the hatching patterns as "symbolic" has been challenged, and several purely functional explanations of the objects have been proposed, e.g. as an ingredient in mastic, skin protection against sun or insects, as soft-hammers for delicate knapping, as a hide preservative or as medicine. The Blombos Cave cross-hatches, dated to as early as 73,000 years old, have been described as "abstract drawings" in a 2018 publication.

== Claimed Lower Paleolithic art ==
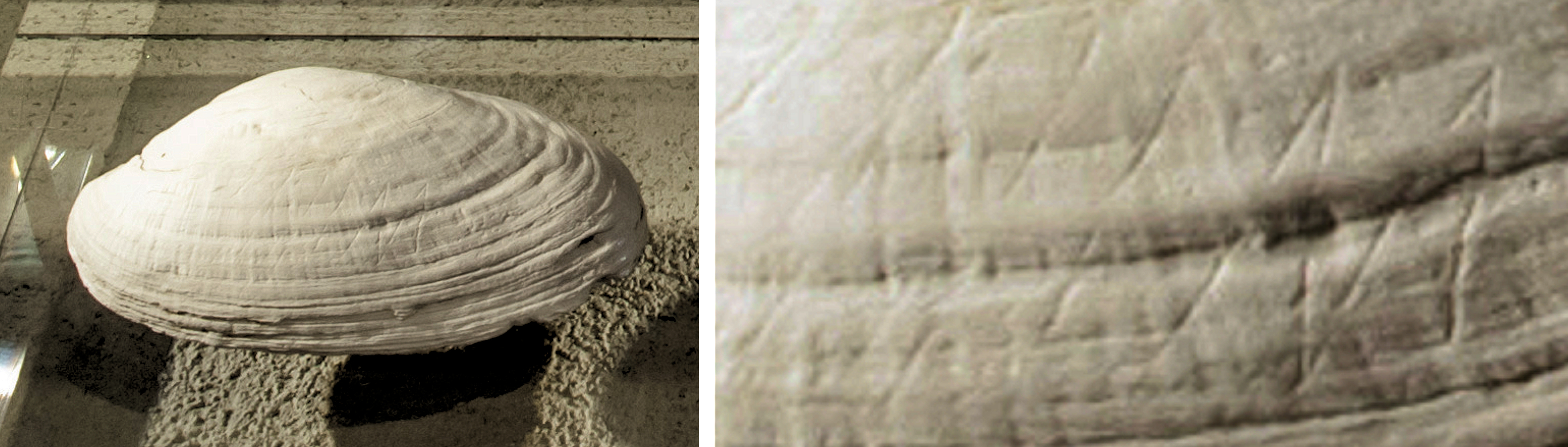
Pseudodon shell DUB1006-fL with the earliest known geometric engravings, supposedly, made by Homo erectus; ca. 500,000 BP; from Trinil (Java); Naturalis Biodiversity Center (Netherlands).

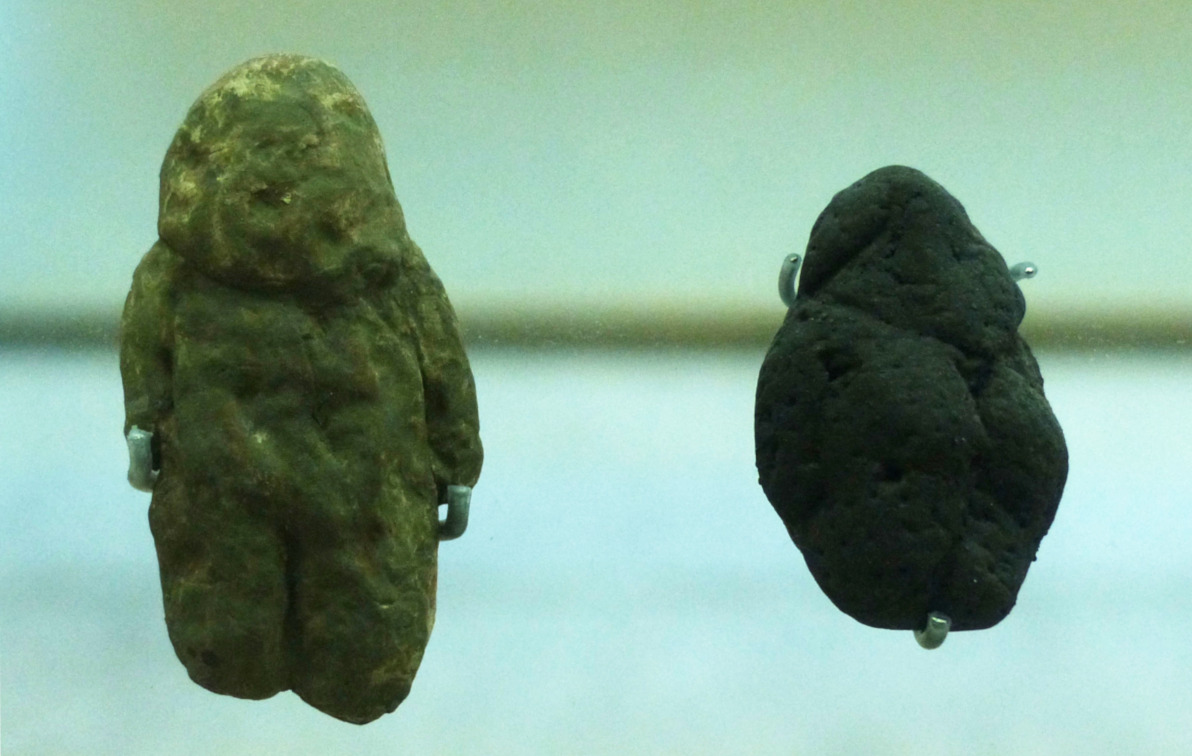
"Venus of Tan-Tan" (left) and "Venus of Berekhat Ram" (replicas)

A 500,000-year-old Pseudodon shell DUB1006-fL found in Java in the 1890s, associated with Homo erectus, contains the earliest known geometric engravings. Although some commentators express an opinion that this could be the earliest evidence of artistic expression of hominids, the actual meaning and intent behind these engravings are not known.

Homo erectus had long before produced seemingly aimless patterns on artifacts such as is those found at Bilzingsleben in Thuringia. Some have attempted to interpret these as a precursor to art, allegedly revealing the intent of the maker to decorate and fashion. The symmetry and attention given to the shape of a tool has led authors to controversially argue Acheulean hand axes as artistic expressions.

There are several other claims of Lower Paleolithic art, namely the "Venus of Tan-Tan" (before 300 kya) and the "Venus of Berekhat Ram" (250 kya). Both of these may be natural rock formations with an incidental likeness to the human form, but some scholars have suggested that they exhibit traces of pigments or carving intended to further accentuate the human-like form.

== See also ==
- Prehistoric art
- Art of the Upper Paleolithic
- List of Stone Age art
- Behavioral modernity
- Origin of language
- Origin of music
- Prehistoric religion
