= Venus of Tan-Tan =

Piece of quartzite resembling a human form

Coordinates: 28°26′28″N 11°06′14″W

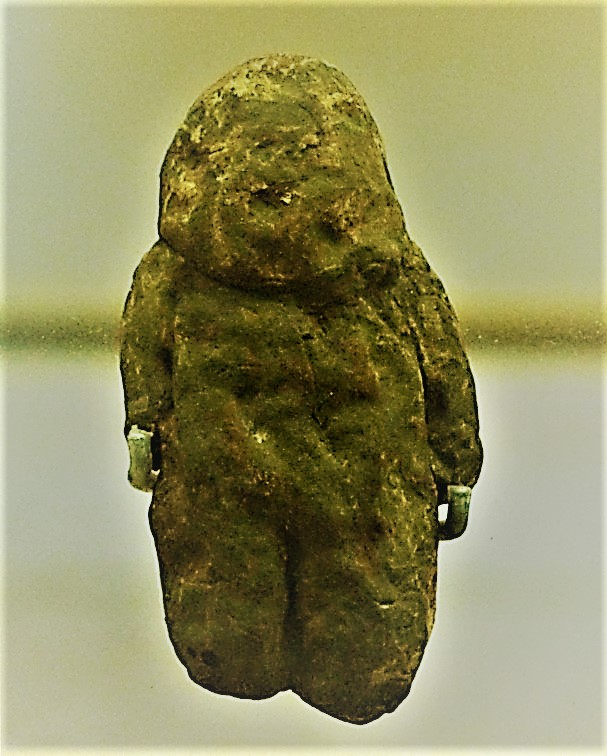
"Venus of Tan-Tan" (replica), Museum of Human Evolution, Burgos, Spain.

The Venus of Tan-Tan (supposedly, 500,000-300,000 BP) is a prehistoric artifact or geofact found in Morocco. It and its contemporary, the Venus of Berekhat Ram, have been claimed as the earliest representations of the human form.

== Description ==
The Venus of Tan-Tan was described by Robert G. Bednarik. The object is a 6 cm long, 2.6 cm wide, and 1.2 cm thick, 10 gram quartzite. It was discovered in 1999 during an archaeological survey by Lutz Fiedler, state archaeologist of Hesse, Germany, in a river terrace deposit on the north bank of the Draa River, near the bridge of the N1 national route over the Draa, about 10 km to the northeast of the Moroccan town of Tan-Tan.

No dating of the artifact nor of the deposit as a whole has been performed, yet both are attributed to the Middle Acheulean by the original discoverers as an unsupported guess due to preconceived notions about the area, which occurs between 500,000 and 300,000 BP in this region.

The object, including its "arms" and "legs", was created by natural geological processes. The horizontal grooves on both sides of the object seem to be formed partly naturally partly artificially (by percussion). The object also contains traces of pigment, which seems to be iron and manganese according to preliminary study.

== Interpretation ==
According to Bednarik, the object has a general human-like shape. He assumed that this shape was recognized by early humans and the object was taken as a manuport. Then its horizontal grooves were accentuated by carving with a stone tool by a hominid which would technically qualify this as an artifact regardless of pre-manipulated formation characteristics, emphasizing the artifact's anthropomorphous character. Possibly, a pigment was applied to further accentuate the human-like form further demonstrating that this figure was carved/edited/manipulated by early humans.

== Controversy ==
To date, the findings of Bednarik have been re-examined by other scholars and his statements have been rejected. Professor Stanley Ambrose, University of Illinois, Urbana-Champaign, has expressed an opinion (based on Bednarik's work and without studying the object directly) that the rock's shape was a result of natural weathering.

== See also ==
- Venus of Berekhat Ram
- Venus of Hohle Fels
- Prehistoric art
- Art of the Middle Paleolithic
