= Venus of Berekhat Ram =

Alleged oldest artifact

Coordinates: 33°13′56″N 35°45′59″E

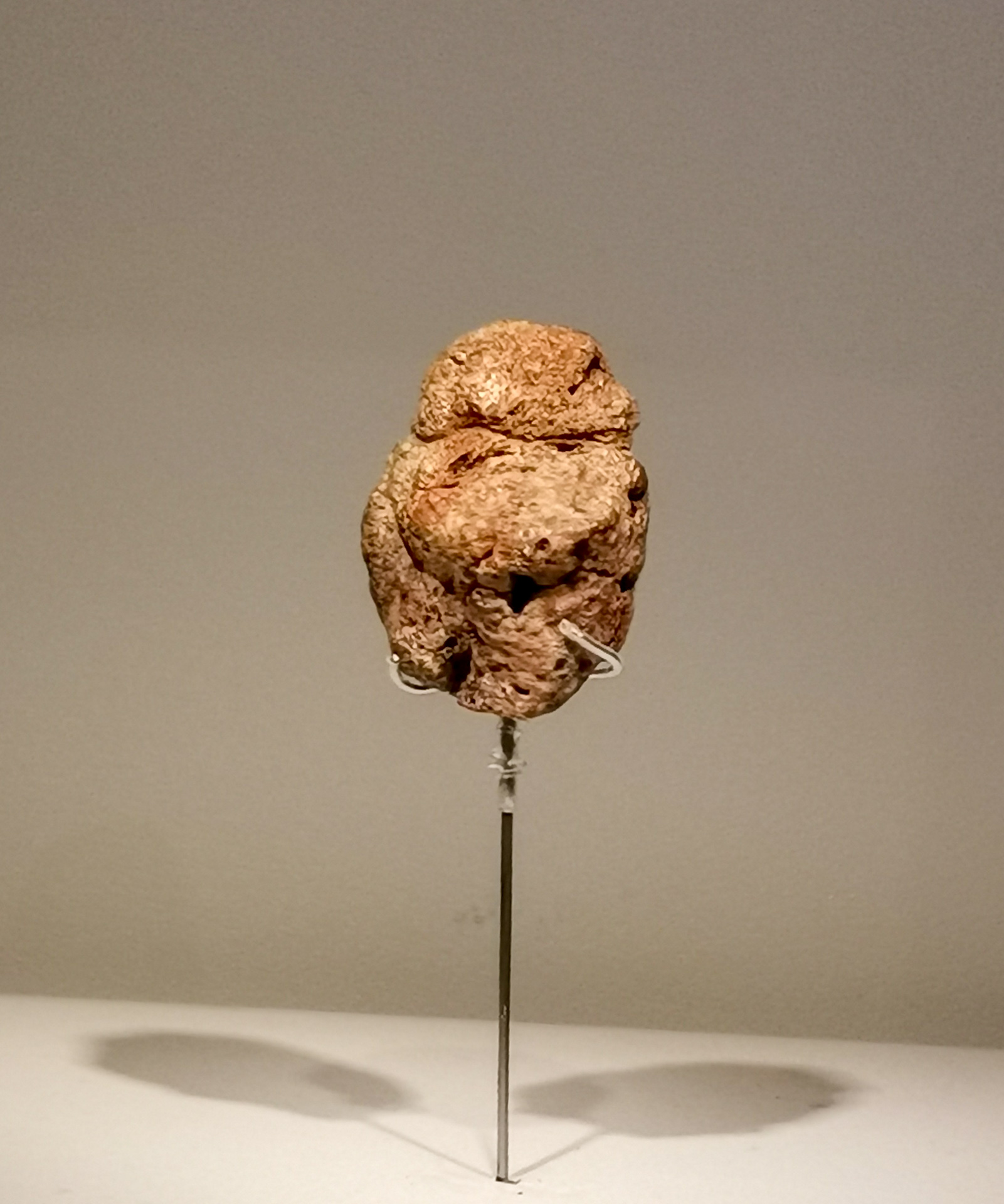
"Venus of Berekhat Ram" (original) Israel Museum, Jerusalem

The Venus of Berekhat Ram (280,000–250,000 BP) is a pebble found at Berekhat Ram on the Golan Heights. The pebble has been suggested to have been modified by early humans and is suggested to represent a female human figure, but actual geofact/artifact delineation has not been seriously conducted.

== Description ==
The object was excavated and first described by Naama Goren-Inbar from the Institute of Archaeology, The Hebrew University of Jerusalem. The artifact is a scoria pebble, 35 mm long, 25 mm wide, and 21 mm thick. It weighs approximately 10 g. It was excavated in 1981 at the Acheulian site of Berekhat Ram, Golan Heights. The object is dated 280,000 to 250,000 BP.

Goren-Inbar reported several artificial grooves on the object: one is a transversal groove in the upper third, others are longitudinal grooves on the sides below the transversal groove. Alexander Marshack performed a microscopic study of the object in 1997. He also reported artificial modifications including the transversal and longitudinal grooves found by Goren-Inbar. Finally, Francesco d'Errico and April Nowell re-examined the object using a comparative approach. They partly confirmed, partly corrected the findings of Marshack. d'Errico and Nowell also reported the above grooves (with some corrections) and, additionally, reported areas of possible abrasion on the front, back and bottom of the object.

== Interpretation ==
Goren-Inbar and Marshack suggested that the object resembled a female body and was artificially modified by hominids to emphasize its anthropomorphic features, but conducted no scientific testing. The object was then called a figurine and is currently known as the Venus of Berekhat Ram (the term "Venus" was taken from the conventional name of much younger Venus figurines of Upper Paleolithic). If this hypothesis is correct, the object would be the earliest example of representational art in the archaeological record, together with the Venus of Tan-Tan.

d'Errico and Nowell confirmed the artificial nature of modifications of the object, but refrained from identifying it with a human body because he couldn't "envision to purpose". It was noted that grooves, in general, may have a functional purpose, but stated that the longitudinal symmetrical U-shaped grooves (supposedly representing the "arms" long slit considered "legs") are hard to explain functionally. So, similarly to Goren-Inbar and Marshack, d'Errico and Nowell argued in favor of the non-utilitarian and symbolic nature of the object.

== Controversy ==
The main discussion around the Venus of Berekhat Ram took place after the study of d'Errico and Nowell. A number of scholars, namely, Ofer Bar-Yosef, Angela E. Close, João Zilhão, Steven Mithen, Thomas G. Wynn, and Alexander Marshack, commented on that study, while d'Errico and Nowell provided a reply to these comments (both the comments and reply are included in the manuscript). The discussion around the Venus of Berekhat Ram concerned three questions:

1. Whether the scratched marks were made by humans or hominids at all.
2. If they were, whether they had non-utilitarian/symbolic intent.
3. If they did, whether they were intended to represent a female figure.

=== Symbolic vs. utilitarian ===
d'Errico and Nowell's argument that the "arm"-shaped grooves suggest a symbolic nature of the object was questioned by three commentators: João Zilhão from the Instituto Português de Arqueologia, Thomas Wynn from the University of Colorado, and Steven Mithen from the University of Reading. All of them suggested that the object and its grooves could have a utilitarian purpose. Zilhão hypothesized that the object could be used to produce pigment and that the grooves could be byproducts of this process. Wynn suggested that the object could be a result of "someone passing time with a stone tool and a pebble". Mithen also stated that our symbolic understanding of the object does not imply that it was considered as such by early humans who produced it, because the cognitive processes for symbolic thinking we use today may differ from the ones used by early humans.

d'Errico and Nowell argued, however, that, although their analysis and results cannot refute a functional interpretation of the object, there are too many inconsistencies in this interpretation to investigate it any further. For example, d'Errico and Nowell suggested that, based on the existing Acheulean archaeological record, pigment "would have been more quickly and effectively produced by grinding one face of this object against a basalt flake or smashing it with a similar tool", which is different from the process used to create the observed grooves. This contradicts the hypothesis of Zilhão. d'Errico and Nowell also believe that the grooves on the object are the result of a deliberate motion rather than of non-purposive behavior, as suggested by Wynn.

=== Representational nature ===
Zilhão, Wynn, and Mithen rejected the hypothesis on the symbolic nature of the object and, thus, rejected the idea that the object is iconic. Angela E. Close from the University of Washington also could not see a figurine of a woman in the object, but, instead, the object reminded her of a penguin and a phallus when seen from different angles.

== See also ==
- Venus of Tan-Tan
- Venus of Hohle Fels
- Prehistoric art
- Art of the Middle Paleolithic
