= Lake Ram =

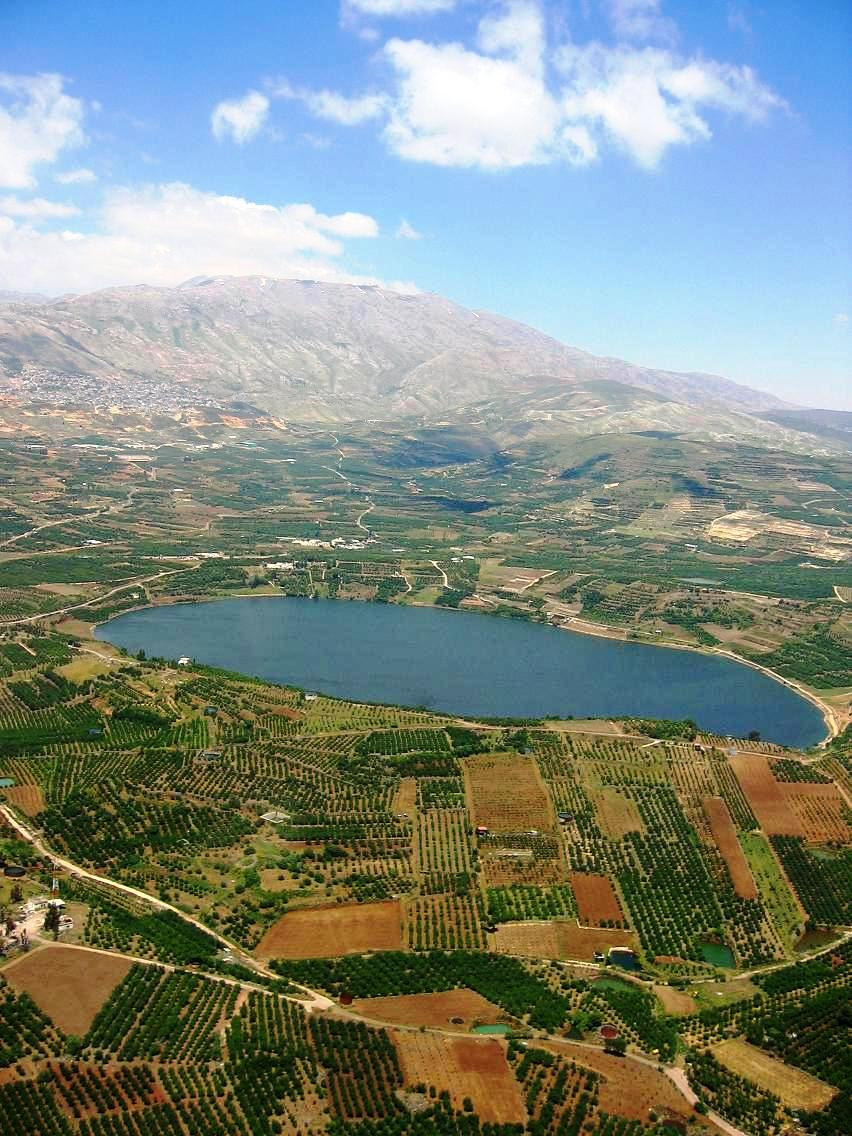
- View with the lofty Mount Hermon beyond

- Location within the Golan Heights
- Location: Golan Heights
- Coordinates: 33°13′57.1″N 35°45′58.8″E
- Type: Crater lake (maar)
- Primary inflows: Precipitation, underground springs
- Basin countries: Golan Heights

Lake Ram (Arabic: بحيرة مسعدة, romanized: Buhairat Mas'ade, lit. 'Lake of Mas'ade' and Birkat el-Ram. Hebrew: בריכת רם, romanized: Brekhat Ram) is a crater lake (maar) in the northeastern Golan Heights near the village of Mas'ade and Mount Hermon.

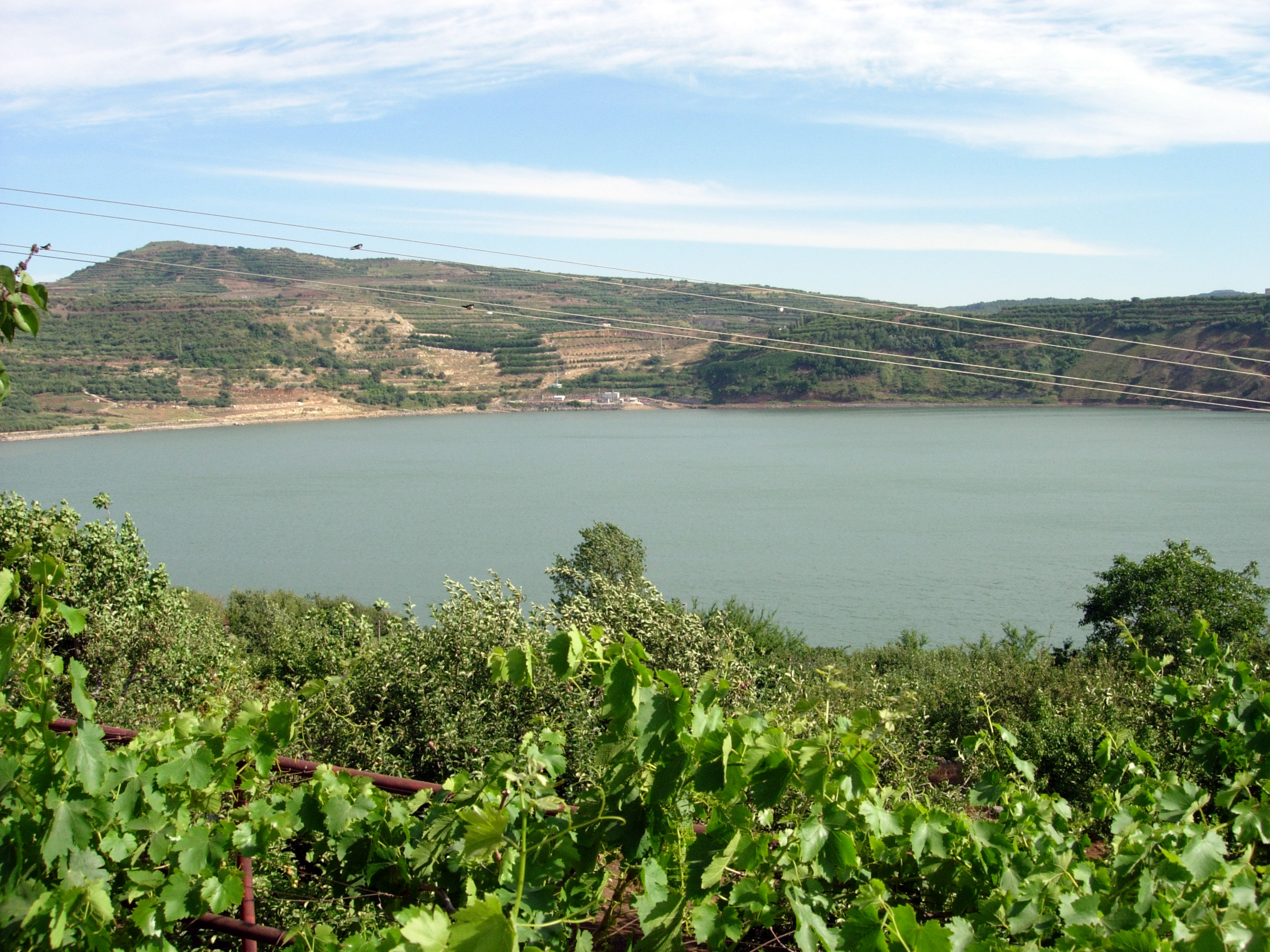
Lake Ram

== History ==
Josephus referred to it as Lake Phiala. The sources of the lake are rain water and an underground spring. The lake has no outlet. It is known in Hebrew as "Brekhat Ram" (also written Berekhat Ram), meaning high pool. It is also called Birket Ram, using the Arabic word for pond. The area is inhabited by the Druze community.

Many geologists believe that the lake formed inside the crater of an extinct volcano.

== Archaeology ==
During excavations evidence was discovered of Palaeolithic human and hominid activity. Most notably, excavation led to the discovery of the Venus of Berekhat Ram, a pebble allegedly worked by Homo erectus. The artefact has been claimed to be the oldest known example of representational art in the world. The pebble was found in a context datable to at least 230,000 years before present time, thus to the early Middle Palaeolithic. The claim that it is the earliest manifestation of human art is contested on multiple grounds (see article).

The site has been excavated for evidence of human activity during its history. Research on lacustrine sediments at the site concluded that the area has been heavily settled four times over history, first during the early Bronze Age, secondly during the Hellenistic and Roman–Byzantine periods, thirdly during the period of medieval Crusader rule, and finally in modern times. Between these periods the area became overgrown as local woodland regenerated, evidencing phases of low human occupation.

== Legends ==
According to The Talmud, Sanhedrin 108a, Brekhat Ram is one of three underground springs, along with Hamat Gader in the southeastern Golan Heights and Hamat Tiberias, that opened up in the Flood of Noah and did not close up again after the flood.

In a local Druze legend the lake is the "eye" of the "sheikh's wife", the name for a hill nearby. Mount Hermon (in Arabic Jabal al-Shaykh, "Mountain of the Sheikh"), referred to as the sheikh himself, is supposed to have been separated from the "wife", whereupon her eye filled with tears.
