= Castañar de Ibor =

Municipality in Extremadura, Spain

Coordinates: 39°37′N 5°25′W

Castañar de Ibor Castañal d'Ibol
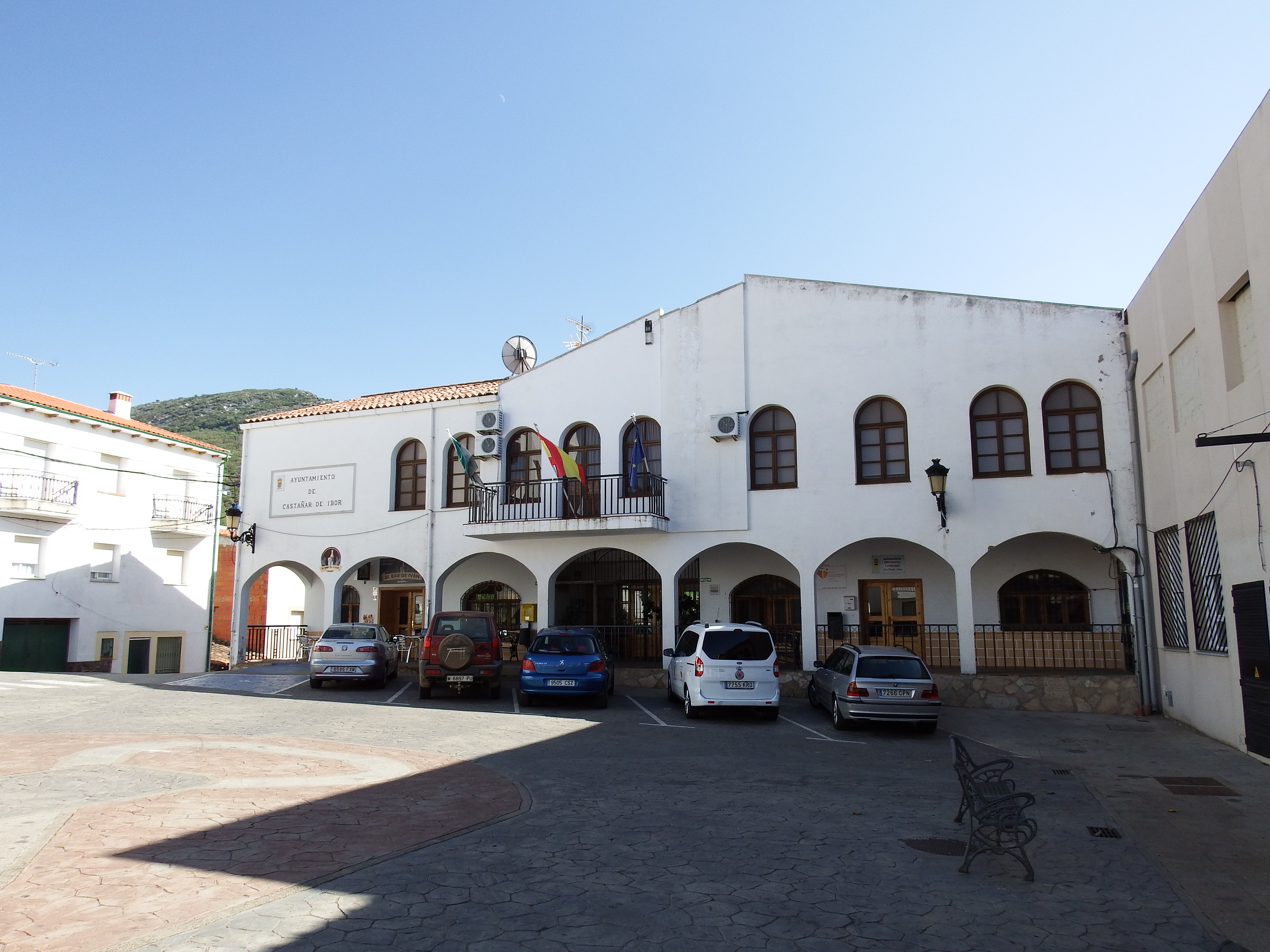
- Town hall of Castañar de Ibor, Cáceres

- Flag Coat of arms

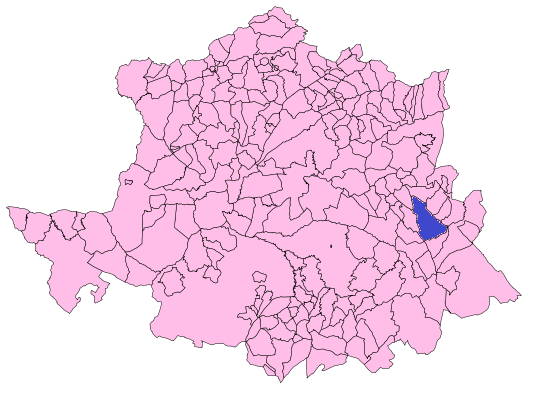
- Map of Castañar de Ibor
- Country: Spain
- Autonomous community: Extremadura
- Province: Cáceres
- Municipality: Castañar de Ibor

Area
  - Total: 149 km^{2} (58 sq mi)
- Elevation: 773 m (2,536 ft)

Population (2025-01-01)
  - Total: 1,020
  - Density: 6.85/km^{2} (17.7/sq mi)
- Time zone: UTC+1 (CET)
  - Summer (DST): UTC+2 (CEST)

Castañar de Ibor (Extremaduran: Castañal d'Ibol) is a municipality located in the province of Cáceres, Extremadura, Spain. According to the 2005 census (INE), it has a population of 1,182.

== See also ==
- Extremaduran language
- List of municipalities in Cáceres
