= Black Arab =

Black Arab or Black Arabs may refer to:

- Afro-Arabs, a people of mixed Black and Arabian ancestry
- Black Arab, depiction of Blacks or Arabs in Serbian mythology and folklore
- Black Arabs F.C., a former name of English football club Bristol Rovers
- Black Arabs - a band who appeared on the Sex Pistols' album The Great Rock 'n' Roll Swindle
- Black Arabian horse
