= Abeed =

Arabic word meaning "slave"

Abeed or abīd (عبيد, plural of ʿabd, عبد) is an Arabic word meaning "servant" or "slave". Historically, abeed did not necessarily indicate ethnicity or skin color. Medieval sources applied the term to slaves of different origins, including Slavs and Turks. The term and related forms were also used outside Arabic. In Ottoman Turkish, for example, abd and abd-i memlûk were among the terms used for male slaves. However, in some Arabic dialects, abeed developed racialized usages, pejoratively referring to Black people or descendants of slaves from Arab slave trades.

== Etymology ==
Abeed is a romanization of the Arabic ʿabīd (عبيد), one of several plural forms of ʿabd (عبد). The word derives from the Arabic root ع ب د (ʿ-b-d), associated with service, worship and submission. Arabic lexicography defines ʿabd both as an enslaved person, in contrast to a free person, and more broadly as a human being or servant of God, and records several plurals, including ʿabīd and ʿibād.

A distinction later developed in which ʿabīd was commonly used for slaves held by people, while ʿibād was commonly used for servants or worshippers of God. This distinction, however, was not absolute. Paul G. Forand notes that ʿabīd itself occurs five times in the Quran, where it refers to the servants or worshippers of God, and that the two forms could occur in overlapping senses.

== Usage ==
The usage of ʿabd and its plural forms has varied by period, region and context. In Classical and Modern Arabic, ʿabd can mean "slave" or "servant", while Arabic lexicography also records the broader sense of a human being or person; several plural forms exist, including ʿabīd and ʿibād. A later tendency distinguished ʿabīd for slaves held by people from ʿibād for servants or worshippers of God, although the distinction was never absolute; ʿabīd itself is also used in the Quran for the servants of God. Historically, ʿabīd was not necessarily a racial designation; Michael Brett notes its use for slaves of different origins, including Slavs as well as Black Africans.

=== Medieval usage ===
The terms ʿabd and ʿabīd were also used as social, legal and military designations without necessarily indicating ethnicity or skin colour. In medieval Islamic armies, ʿabīd could refer to slave soldiers of different origins. Yehoshua Frenkel notes that slave soldiers described as ʿabīd included Turks recruited from the Eurasian steppes into the armies of the Abbasid Caliphate. In medieval North Africa, the term was likewise applied to troops of slave origin regardless of colour. Michael Brett notes that some early Aghlabid ʿabīd were probably Slavs or other Europeans and cautions against assuming that soldiers described by the term were necessarily Black.

The Arabic term also entered Ottoman Turkish. Ottoman sources used abd and the compound abd-i memlûk among several terms for male slaves, alongside kul, köle, gulâm and bende. Seventeenth-century Ottoman court records from Trabzon frequently describe male slaves as abd-i memlûk. The expression was not restricted to Africans: an Ottoman court record from Galata in 1663, for example, describes a Croatian man named Yuvan as an abd-i âbık, or runaway slave.

The word also appears in other non-Arab Islamic societies. Persian-language inscriptions from the Indian subcontinent between the thirteenth and eighteenth centuries used Arabic al-ʿabd alongside Persian bandah and ghulām to identify slaves and servants attached to particular rulers or households.

In medieval Nubia, ʿabīd could also refer more broadly to dependants or functionaries. Geoffrey Khan notes examples in Arabic correspondence in which the ʿabīd of an official appear to have been his staff, while al-ʿabd was also used by writers as a polite form of self-reference when addressing a social superior.

=== Ottoman period ===
In late Ottoman Palestine, ʿabd (plural ʿabīd) developed a racialized local usage. Sarah and Johann Büssow write that in local Arabic usage the term came to mean specifically a Black slave and could also be used collectively for communities of trans-Saharan African origin. They also document an ʿAbid community in Jaffa which continued to function as a distinct social community after the decline of formal slavery.

During the British Mandate, British authorities officially regarded slavery as no longer existing in Palestine proper, although forms of dependency connected with former slavery persisted. Legal historian Assaf Likhovski notes that some ʿabid communities in the Jordan Valley consisted of descendants of former Black slaves who were legally free but in some cases remained economically and socially dependent on their former Bedouin masters.

=== Modern usage ===
==== Usage in Palestine ====
In modern Palestinian usage, abeed has sometimes been used derogatorily toward Black Palestinians. A 2017 report from the Gaza Strip described a predominantly Black Palestinian neighbourhood in the Al-Jalla'a district as being known locally as "Al Abeed" and reported discrimination in some employment and marriage contexts, while also noting that experiences of discrimination varied among individuals and localities.

==== Usage in Sudan ====
In Sudan, abeed has been used as a derogatory designation for South Sudanese, linking regional and racial identities with the historical status of slavery. In his 2001 study War and Slavery in Sudan, South Sudanese anthropologist Jok Madut Jok wrote that South Sudanese continued to be referred to as abeed ("slaves") by North Sudanese.

Writing about displaced Southerners living in northern Sudan, Jok argued that their concentration in low-status occupations contributed to their being equated with slaves. He described relationships involving agricultural and urban labour, patronage, servitude and bonded work, placing displaced Southerners at the bottom of what he characterized as a racial hierarchy in northern Sudan.

The association of abeed with Sudan's North–South political and racial divisions predates Jok's study. Anthropologist Carolyn Fluehr-Lobban documented the use of abeed ("slaves") in discussions of northern attitudes toward southern Sudanese in her study of Islamization and North–South relations in Sudan.

== See also ==
- List of ethnic slurs
- Indian Ocean slave trade
- Red Sea slave trade
- Trans-Saharan slave trade
- Abd (Arabic)
