= Timeline of materials technology =

Major innovations in materials technology

== BC ==
- 28,000 BC – People wear beads, bracelets, and pendants
- 14,500 BC – First pottery, made by the Jōmon people of Japan.
- 6th millennium BC – Copper metallurgy is invented and copper is used for ornamentation (see Pločnik article)
- 2nd millennium BC – Bronze is used for weapons and armor
- 16th century BC – The Hittites develop crude iron metallurgy
- 13th century BC – Invention of steel when iron and charcoal are combined properly
- 10th century BC – Glass production begins in ancient Near East
- 1st millennium BC – Pewter beginning to be used in China and Egypt
- 1000 BC – The Phoenicians introduce dyes made from the purple murex.
- 3rd century BC – Wootz steel, the first crucible steel, is invented in ancient India
- 50s BC – Glassblowing techniques flourish in Phoenicia
- 20s BC – Roman architect Vitruvius describes low-water-content method for mixing concrete

== 1st millennium ==
- 3rd century – Cast iron widely used in Han dynasty China
- 300 – Greek alchemist Zomius, summarizing the work of Egyptian alchemists, describes arsenic and lead acetate
- 4th century – Iron pillar of Delhi is the oldest surviving example of corrosion-resistant steel
- 8th century – Porcelain is invented in Tang dynasty China
- 8th century – Tin-glazing of ceramics invented by Muslim chemists and potters in Basra, Iraq
- 9th century – Stonepaste ceramics invented in Iraq
- 900 – First systematic classification of chemical substances appears in the works attributed to Jābir ibn Ḥayyān (Latin: Geber) and in those of the Persian alchemist and physician Abū Bakr al-Rāzī (c. 865–925, Latin: Rhazes)
- 900 – Synthesis of ammonium chloride from organic substances described in the works attributed to Jābir ibn Ḥayyān (Latin: Geber)
- 900 – Abū Bakr al-Rāzī describes the preparation of plaster of Paris and metallic antimony
- 9th century – Lustreware appears in Mesopotamia

== 2nd millennium ==
- 1000 – Gunpowder is developed in China
- 1340 – In Liège, Belgium, the first blast furnaces for the production of iron are developed
- 1448 – Johann Gutenberg develops type metal alloy
- 1450s – Cristallo, a clear soda-based glass, is invented by Angelo Barovier
- 1540 – Vannoccio Biringuccio publishes first systematic book on metallurgy
- 1556 – Georg Agricola's influential book on metallurgy
- 1590 – Glass lenses are developed in the Netherlands and used for the first time in microscopes and telescopes
- 1664 – In the pipes supplying water to the gardens at Versailles, cast iron is used

=== 18th century ===
- 1717 – Abraham Darby makes iron with coke, a derivative of coal
- 1738 – Metallic zinc processed by distillation from calamine and charcoal patented by William Champion
- 1740 – Crucible steel technique developed by Benjamin Huntsman
- 1774 –
  - Joseph Priestley discovers oxygen
  - Johann Gottlieb Gahn discovers manganese
  - Karl Wilhelm Scheele discovers chlorine
- 1779 – Hydraulic cement (stucco) patented by Bryan Higgins for use as an exterior plaster
- 1799 – Acid battery made from copper/zinc by Alessandro Volta

=== 19th century ===
- 1821 – Thermocouple invented by Thomas Johann Seebeck
- 1824 – Portland cement patent issued to Joseph Aspdin
- 1825 – Metallic aluminum produced by Hans Christian Ørsted
- 1839 – Vulcanized rubber invented by Charles Goodyear
- 1839 – Silver-based photographic processes invented by Louis Daguerre and William Fox Talbot
- 1855 – Bessemer process for mass production of steel patented by Henry Bessemer
- 1861 – Color photography demonstrated by James Clerk Maxwell
- 1883 – First solar cells using selenium waffles made by Charles Fritts
- 1893 – Thermite Welding developed and soon used to weld rails

=== 20th century ===
- 1902 – Synthetic rubies created by the Verneuil process developed by Auguste Verneuil
- 1908 – Cellophane invented by Jacques E. Brandenberger
- 1909 – Bakelite hard thermosetting plastic presented by Leo Baekeland
- 1911 – Superconductivity discovered by Heike Kamerlingh Onnes
- 1912 – Stainless steel invented by Harry Brearley
- 1916 – Method for growing single crystals of metals invented by Jan Czochralski
- 1919 – The merchant ship Fullagar has the first all welded hull.
- 1924 – Pyrex invented by scientists at Corning Incorporated, a glass with a very low coefficient of thermal expansion
- 1931 – synthetic rubber called neoprene developed by Julius Nieuwland (see also: E.K. Bolton, Wallace Carothers)
- 1931 – Nylon developed by Wallace Carothers
- 1935 – Langmuir–Blodgett film coating of glass was developed by Katharine Burr Blodgett, creating "invisible glass" which is >99% transmissive
- 1938 – The process for making poly-tetrafluoroethylene, better known as Teflon discovered by Roy Plunkett
- 1939 – Dislocations in metals confirmed by Robert W. Cahn
- 1947 – First germanium point-contact transistor invented
- 1947 – First commercial application of a piezoelectric ceramic: barium titanate used as a phonograph pickup
- 1951 – Individual atoms seen for the first time using the field ion microscope
- 1953 – Metallic catalysts which greatly improve the strength of polyethylene polymers discovered by Karl Ziegler
- 1954 – Silicon solar cells with 6% efficiency made at Bell Laboratories
- 1954 – Argon oxygen decarburization (AOD) refining invented by scientists at the Union Carbide Corporation
- 1959 – Float glass process patented by the Pilkington Brothers
- 1962 – SQUID superconducting quantum interference device invented
- 1966 – Stephanie Kwolek invented a fibre that would later become known as Kevlar
- 1968 – Liquid crystal display developed by RCA
- 1970 – Silica optical fibers grown by Corning Incorporated
- 1980 – Duplex stainless steels developed which resist oxidation in chlorides
- 1984 – Fold-forming system developed by Charles Lewton-Brain to produce complex three dimensional forms rapidly from sheet metal
- 1985 – The first fullerene molecule discovered by scientists at Rice University (see also: Timeline of carbon nanotubes)
- 1986 – The first high temperature superconductor is discovered by Georg Bednorz and K. Alex Müller

== See also ==
- Timeline of scientific discoveries
- Timeline of historic inventions
- List of inventions named after people
- Materials science
- Roman metallurgy
