= 1856 in science =

List of years in science	(table)
- … 1846; 1847; 1848; 1849; 1850; 1851; 1852; 1853; 1854; 1855; 1856; 1857; 1858; 1859; 1860; 1861; 1862; 1863; 1864; 1865; 1866 …
- Art; Archaeology; Architecture; Literature; Music; Philosophy; Science; +...

The year 1856 in science and technology involved some significant events, listed below.

== Archaeology ==
- First remains of Neanderthal Man found in the Neandertal Valley of Germany.

== Astronomy ==
- N. R. Pogson proposes that the ratio used in Hipparchus' stellar apparent magnitude system should be adopted as a standard.
- NGC 6539 is discovered by Theodor Brorsen.

== Biology ==
- Paul Du Chaillu becomes the first European to observe gorillas in the wild.
- Gregor Mendel starts his research on genetics.
- Lev Tsenkovsky introduces the concept that the lower algae and other infusoria are unicellular organisms.

== Chemistry ==
- March – William Perkin first discovers an aniline dye, mauveine.
- Alexander Parkes patents the first thermoplastic, Parkesine.
- Louis Pasteur crystallizes galactose.
- Charles-Adolphe Wurtz discovers the glycols.

== Exploration ==
- May 20 – Dr David Livingstone arrives at Quelimane on the Indian Ocean having completed a 2-year transcontinental journey across Africa from Luanda.
- Thomas Montgomerie of the Great Trigonometric Survey of India makes the first survey of the Karakoram Range, from Mount Haramukh, 210 km (130 miles) to the south, and designates the two most prominent peaks as K1 and K2.

== Mathematics ==
- Irish mathematician William Rowan Hamilton invents the icosian game, which involves finding the Hamiltonian path on a dodecahedron.

== Meteorology ==
- August 23 – Eunice Newton Foote's paper on "Circumstances affecting the heat of the sun's rays" read at the American Association for the Advancement of Science presents the causes of the greenhouse effect.
- October 4 – American meteorologist William Ferrel demonstrates the tendency of rising and rotating warm air to pull in air from more southerly, warmer regions and transport it poleward.

== Paleontology ==
- American paleontologist Joseph Leidy describes the new tyrannosaurid dinosaur genus and species Deinodon horridus.

== Physics ==
- Henry Darcy formulates Darcy's law on fluid flow.

== Technology ==
- September 22 – British metallurgist Robert Mushet patents improvements to the Bessemer process for the production of steel.
- English agricultural engineer John Fowler first demonstrates his steam-driven agricultural ploughing system.
- English engineer John Ramsbottom invents a tamper-proof spring safety valve for steam locomotives.
- French chemist Alphonse Louis Poitevin invents the collotype photographic process.
- Tinsmith Ralph Collier of Baltimore, Maryland, patents the first egg beater with rotating parts.
- James Harrison produces the world's first practical ice making machine and refrigerator using the principle of vapour compression in Geelong, Australia.
- Moravian Leopold Breit introduces Streichmelodion.
- Sarrusophone patented.
- Approximate date – Bandoneon invented.

== Awards ==
- Copley Medal: Henri Milne-Edwards
- Wollaston Medal for Geology: William Edmond Logan

== Births ==
- February 15 – Emil Kraepelin (died 1926), German psychiatrist.
- March 9 – Edward Goodrich Acheson (died 1931), American industrial chemist.
- May 6
  - Sigmund Freud (died 1939), Austrian psychoanalyst.
  - Robert Peary (died 1920), American polar explorer.
- May 19 – Nadezhda Ziber-Shumova (died 1916), Russian biochemist.
- July 10 – Nikola Tesla (died 1943), Serb inventor.
- August 27 – Hans Christian Cornelius Mortensen (died 1921), Danish ornithologist.
- August 30 – Charles Alfred Ballance (died 1936), English surgeon.
- September 14 – Sergei Winogradsky (died 1953), Russian microbiologist.
- December 18 – J. J. Thomson (died 1940), English physicist and Nobel laureate in physics.

== Deaths ==
- February 24 (February 12 Old Style) – Nikolai Lobachevsky (born 1792), Russian mathematician and geometer.
- February 25 – George Don (born 1797), Scottish botanist.
- July 9 – Amedeo Avogadro (born 1776), Italian chemist.
- August 24 – William Buckland (born 1784), English geologist and paleontologist.
- September 1 – William Yarrell (born 1784), English zoologist and bookseller.
- November 20 – Farkas Bolyai (born 1775), Hungarian mathematician.
- November 21 – James Meadows Rendel (born 1799), English civil engineer.
- December 23/24 – Hugh Miller (born 1802), Scottish geologist (suicide).
- date unknown – Enriqueta Favez (born 1791), Swiss physician and surgeon.
