= 1840 in science =

List of years in science	(table)
- … 1830; 1831; 1832; 1833; 1834; 1835; 1836; 1837; 1838; 1839; 1840; 1841; 1842; 1843; 1844; 1845; 1846; 1847; 1848; 1849; 1850 …
- Art; Archaeology; Architecture; Literature; Music; Philosophy; Science; +...

The year 1840 in science and technology involved some significant events, listed below.

== Events ==
- William Whewell publishes The Philosophy of the Inductive Sciences, introducing the terms scientist (for the second time) and physicist.
- Justus von Liebig publishes Die Organische Chemie in ihre Anwendung auf Agricultur und Physiologie in Braunschweig, emphasising the importance of agricultural chemistry in crop production; it will go through at least eight editions.
- The first known photograph of Niagara Falls, a daguerreotype, is taken by English chemist Hugh Lee Pattinson.

== Astronomy ==
- John William Draper invents astronomical photography and photographs the Moon.

== Biology ==
- John Gould begins publication of The Birds of Australia.

== Chemistry ==
- Germain Hess proposes Hess's law, an early statement of the law of conservation of energy, which establishes that energy changes in a chemical process depend only on the states of the starting and product materials and not on the specific pathway taken between the two states.
- George Richards Elkington patents the electroplating process invented by surgeon John Wright of Birmingham in England.

== Earth sciences ==
- Louis Agassiz publishes his Etudes sur les glaciers, the first major scientific work to propose that the Earth has seen an ice age.
- Roderick Murchison identifies Devonian stratigraphy in Russia, ending the Great Devonian Controversy.

== Exploration ==
- January 19 – Captain Charles Wilkes' United States Exploring Expedition sights Wilkes Land, providing evidence that Antarctica is a complete continent.
- January 21 – Adélie Land first visited by Jules Dumont d'Urville in the French ship Astrolabe.
- The Nemesis (1839) becomes the first iron ship to sail around the Cape of Good Hope, aided by techniques to adjust the compass for the effect of an iron hull developed the year before by George Biddell Airy, the Astronomer Royal.

== History of science ==
- Publication begins in Paris of the Œuvres complètes d’Ambroise Paré edited by Joseph-François Malgaigne.

== Medicine ==
- April 15 – King's College Hospital opens in London.
- July 23 – Vaccination Act 1840 in the United Kingdom provides for free vaccination for the poor and prohibits variolation.

== Metrology ==
- Joseph Whitworth introduces his precision "end measurements" technique.

== Physics ==
- Carl Friedrich Gauss publishes his Dioptrische Untersuchungen, in which he gives the first systematic analysis of the formation of images under a paraxial approximation (Gaussian optics).

== Technology ==
- Robert Bunsen invents the Bunsen cell.
- British inventor Warren De la Rue creates the first light bulb using a vacuum tube, although its use of a platinum coil makes it commercially unviable.

== Awards ==
- Copley Medal: Justus Liebig; Charles-François Sturm
- Wollaston Medal: Andre Hubert Dumont

== Births ==
- January 21 – Sophia Jex-Blake (died 1912), English physician.
- February 5
  - John Boyd Dunlop (died 1921), Scottish-born inventor.
  - Hiram Maxim (died 1916), American-born inventor of the machine gun.
- February 10 – Per Teodor Cleve (died 1905), Swedish chemist.
- March 28 – Emin Pasha, born Isaak Schnitzer (died 1892), Silesian-born explorer.
- March 31 – Benjamin Baker (died 1907), English civil engineer.
- April 9 – Praskovya Uvarova (died 1924), Russian archaeologist.
- April 22 – Thomas Clouston (died 1915), Scottish psychiatrist.
- July 28 – Edward Drinker Cope (died 1897), American paleontologist.
- August 4 – Richard von Krafft-Ebing (died 1902), German sexologist.
- November 24 – John Brashear (died 1920), American astronomer.
- November 29 – James Crichton-Browne (died 1938), Scottish psychiatrist.

== Deaths ==
- March 2 – Heinrich Wilhelm Matthias Olbers (born 1758), German astronomer.
- March 23 – William Maclure (born 1763), Scottish American geologist.
- April 25 – Siméon Denis Poisson (born 1781), French mathematician.
- April 29 – Pierre Jean Robiquet (born 1780), French chemist.
- July 4 – Karl Ferdinand von Gräfe (born 1787), German surgeon.
- August 31 - Giuseppangelo Fonzi, Italian dentist (born 1768)
- September 18 – Constantine Samuel Rafinesque (born 1783), French American polymath.
- November 2 – Sir Anthony Carlisle (born 1768), English surgeon.
- December 11 – Franz Bauer (born 1758), Moravian-born botanical illustrator.
