= 1839 in science =

List of years in science	(table)
- … 1829; 1830; 1831; 1832; 1833; 1834; 1835; 1836; 1837; 1838; 1839; 1840; 1841; 1842; 1843; 1844; 1845; 1846; 1847; 1848; 1849 …
- Art; Archaeology; Architecture; Literature; Music; Philosophy; Science; +...

The year 1839 in science and technology involved some significant events, listed below.

== Astronomy ==
- January – The first parallax measurement of the distance to Alpha Centauri is published by Thomas Henderson.
- January 2 – The first photograph of the Moon is taken by Louis Daguerre.

== Biology ==
- January 29 – English naturalist Charles Darwin marries his cousin Emma Wedgwood.
- Theodor Schwann proposes that all living matter is made up of cells.
- The beetle subfamily Oxyporinae is discovered by Wilhelm Ferdinand Erichson.

== Chemistry ==
- Carl Mosander discovers lanthanum.

== Exploration ==
- May 1 – Start of Eyre's expeditions to the interior of South Australia.
- September 19 – James Clark Ross sets off on the first scientific expedition to survey Antarctica.
- Publication of Charles Darwin's Journal of Researches into the Geology and Natural History of the Various Countries Visited by H.M.S. Beagle under the Command of Captain FitzRoy, R.N., from 1832 to 1839.

== Geology ==
- Roderick Murchison publishes The Silurian System.
- December 24 – An enormous landslide occurs at Axmouth in the English county of Devon, creating the Axmouth to Lyme Regis Undercliff. A report by geologists William Daniel Conybeare and William Buckland is one of the earliest scientific descriptions of such an event.

== Medicine ==
- June–September – Dr John Conolly abolishes the physical restraint of the insane at Middlesex County Asylum (at Hanwell near London).

== Technology ==
- January 9 – The French Academy of Sciences announces the Daguerreotype photography process.
- January 25 – H. Fox Talbot shows his "photogenic drawings" at the Royal Institution.
- February 24 – William Otis receives a patent for the steam shovel.
- April 9 – The world's first commercial electric telegraph line comes into operation alongside the Great Western Railway in England.
- May 29 – Mungo Ponton presents his discovery of the light-sensitive quality of sodium dichromate as a method of permanent photography.
- November 24 – James Nasmyth makes his first sketch of a steam hammer design.
- Michael Faraday publishes Experimental Researches in Electricity clarifying the true nature of electricity.
- Invention of the Grove fuel cell by William Grove.
- Development of vulcanized rubber by Charles Goodyear.
- Development of Babbitt metal by Isaac Babbitt.
- Invention of the Polonceau truss for roof construction by Camille Polonceau.
- Claimed invention of the rear-wheel driven bicycle by Kirkpatrick Macmillan in Scotland.

== Awards ==
- Copley Medal: Robert Brown
- Wollaston Medal: Christian Gottfried Ehrenberg

== Births ==
- January 26 – Rachel Lloyd (d. 1900), American chemist.
- January 27 – Marie-Adolphe Carnot (died 1920), French chemist and mining engineer.
- February 11
  - Josiah Willard Gibbs (died 1903), American theoretical physicist and chemist.
  - Almon Strowger (died 1902), American telecommunications engineer.
- February 15 – Hieronymus Georg Zeuthen (died 1920), Danish mathematician.
- March 8 – Josephine Cochrane (died 1913), American inventor of the first commercially successful dishwasher.
- March 16 – Sully Prudhomme (died 1907), French engineer and poet, recipient of the Nobel Prize in Literature.
- April 4 – James Blyth (died 1906), Scottish electrical engineer.
- April 12 – Nikolai Przhevalsky (died 1888), Russian-born Polish explorer.
- May 8 – George Miller Beard (died 1883), American neurologist.
- July 17 – Ephraim Shay (died 1916), American steam locomotive engineer.
- September 10 – Charles Sanders Peirce (died 1914), American philosopher, logician, mathematician and scientist.

== Deaths ==
- January 22 – Christian Ramsay, Lady Dalhousie (born 1786), Scottish botanist.
- April 8 – Pierre Prévost (born 1751), Swiss physicist.
- June 27 – Allan Cunningham (born 1791), English botanist and explorer.
- August 28 – William Smith (born 1769), English geologist.
- August 10 – Sir John St Aubyn, 5th Baronet (born 1758), English fossil collector.
- September 29 – Friedrich Mohs (born 1773), German mineralogist.
- October 24 – Sir William Charles Ellis (born 1780), English psychiatric physician.
- November 15 – William Murdoch (born 1754), Scottish-born inventor and technician.
- December 24 – Davies Gilbert (born 1767), English promoter of science.
