= 1709 in science =

List of years in science	(table)
- … 1699; 1700; 1701; 1702; 1703; 1704; 1705; 1706; 1707; 1708; 1709; 1710; 1711; 1712; 1713; 1714; 1715; 1716; 1717; 1718; 1719 …
- Art; Archaeology; Architecture; Literature; Music; Philosophy; Science; +...

The year 1709 in science and technology involved some significant events.

== Meteorology ==
- January – Great Frost in Western Europe.

== Physics ==
- Francis Hauksbee publishes Physico-Mechanical Experiments on Various Subjects, summarizing the results of his many experiments with electricity and other topics.

== Technology ==
- January 10 – Industrial Revolution: Abraham Darby I successfully produces cast iron using coke fuel at his Coalbrookdale blast furnace in Shropshire, England.
- February 5 – Dramatist John Dennis devises the thundersheet as a new method of producing theatrical thunder for his tragedy Appius and Virginia at the Theatre Royal, Drury Lane, London.
- March 28 – Johann Friedrich Böttger reports the first production of hard-paste porcelain in Europe, at Dresden.
- July 13 – Johann Maria Farina founds Farina gegenüber, the first Eau de Cologne and perfume factory in Cologne, Germany.
- August 8 – Hot air balloon of Bartholome de Gusmão flies in Portugal.
- A collapsible umbrella is introduced in Paris.

== Awards ==
- April 9 – Sir Godfrey Copley, 2nd Baronet dies and in his will provides funding to the Royal Society for the annual Copley Medal honoring achievement in science (first awarded in 1731).

== Births ==
- February 24 – Jacques de Vaucanson, French engineer and inventor (died 1782)
- March 3 – Andreas Sigismund Marggraf, German chemist (died 1782)
- March 10 – Georg Steller, German naturalist (died 1746)
- April 17 – Giovanni Domenico Maraldi, French-Italian astronomer (died 1788)
- July 11 – Johan Gottschalk Wallerius, Swedish chemist and mineralogist (died 1785)
- August 8 – Johann Georg Gmelin, German botanist (died 1755)
- November 23 – Julien Offray de La Mettrie, French physician and philosopher (died 1751)

== Deaths ==
- early – Eleanor Glanville, English entomologist (born c. 1654)
- June 29 – Antoine Thomas, Belgian Jesuit astronomer in China (born 1644)
- June 30 – Edward Lhuyd, Welsh naturalist (born 1660)
- October 17 – François Mauriceau, French obstetrician (born 1637)
