= 1784 in science =

List of years in science	(table)
- … 1774; 1775; 1776; 1777; 1778; 1779; 1780; 1781; 1782; 1783; 1784; 1785; 1786; 1787; 1788; 1789; 1790; 1791; 1792; 1793; 1794 …
- Art; Archaeology; Architecture; Literature; Music; Philosophy; Science; +...

The year 1784 in science and technology involved some significant events.

== Astronomy ==
- September 10 – Edward Pigott identifies the variable star Eta Aquilae from York, England.
- October 19 – John Goodricke begins his observations of the variable star Delta Cephei from York.

== Biology ==
- Publication of the Annals of Agriculture edited by Arthur Young begins in Great Britain.
- Peter Simon Pallas begins publication of Flora Rossica, the first Flora of Russia.

== Chemistry ==
- L'Abbé René Just Haüy states the geometrical law of crystallization.
- Antoine Lavoisier pioneers stoichiometry.
- Citric acid is first isolated by Carl Wilhelm Scheele, who crystallizes it from lemon juice.
- Cholesterol is isolated.

== History of science ==
- Publication of David Bourgeois' Recherches sur l'art de voler, depuis la plus haute antiquité jusque'a ce jour in Paris, the earliest work on the history of flight.

== Mathematics ==
- Carl Friedrich Gauss, at the age of seven, pioneers the field of summation with the formula summing 1:n as (n(n+1))/2.

== Medicine ==
- 11 February – Royal College of Surgeons in Ireland chartered.
- 12 March — Appointment of the French Royal Commission on Animal Magnetism (the Commission's Report was presented to King Louis XVI on 11 August 1784).
- Madame du Coudray, pioneer of modern midwifery in France, retires.
- Benjamin Franklin makes the first known specific reference (in a letter) to the wearing of bifocal spectacles.
- John Hunter first describes the condition phlebitis.

== Paleontology ==
- The first description of a Pterodactylus fossil is made by Cosimo Alessandro Collini, although he is unable to determine what kind of creature it is.

== Physics ==
- January 15 – Henry Cavendish's paper to the Royal Society of London, Experiments on Air, reveals the composition of water.
- Jean-Paul Marat publishes Notions élémentaires d'optique (Elementary Notions of Optics)

== Surveying ==
- William Roy measures the baseline for the Anglo-French Survey (1784–1790) linking the observatories of Paris and Greenwich. The measurement is accurate to within a few inches in a distance of over 280,000 ft., an unprecedented accuracy for this time. Roy is awarded the Copley Medal in the following year.

== Technology ==
- April 28 – James Watt receives a British patent for his parallel motion and other improvements to the steam engine.
- June 4 – Élisabeth Thible becomes the first woman passenger in a hot-air balloon, at Lyon, France.
- August 21 – Joseph Bramah receives his first lock patent in London.
- Rev. Dr. Edmund Cartwright designs his first power loom in England.
- Henry Cort of Funtley, England, applies the coal-fired reverbatory furnace to the puddling process for conversion of cast to wrought iron.

== Awards ==
- Copley Medal: Edward Waring

== Births ==
- March 12 – William Buckland, English geologist and paleontologist (died 1856)
- June 3 – William Yarrell, English zoologist and bookseller (died 1856)
- June 17 – Andrew Crosse, English 'gentleman scientist', pioneer experimenter in electricity (died 1855)
- July 22 – Friedrich Bessel, German mathematician (died 1846)
- September 1 – Thomas Frederick Colby, English cartographer (died 1852)

== Deaths ==
- May 12 – Abraham Trembley, Genevan naturalist (born 1710)
- September 1 – Jean-François Séguier, French astronomer and botanist (born 1703)
- September 4 – César-François Cassini de Thury, French astronomer (born 1714)
