= 1703 in science =

List of years in science	(table)
- … 1693; 1694; 1695; 1696; 1697; 1698; 1699; 1700; 1701; 1702; 1703; 1704; 1705; 1706; 1707; 1708; 1709; 1710; 1711; 1712; 1713 …
- Art; Archaeology; Architecture; Literature; Music; Philosophy; Science; +...

The year 1703 in science and technology involved some significant events.

== Biology ==
- Charles Plumier's Nova plantarum Americanarum genera begins publication in Paris. This includes descriptions of Fuchsia, discovered by him on Hispaniola, and naming of the genus Magnolia, applied to species from Martinique.

== Chemistry ==
- Georg Ernst Stahl, professor of medicine and chemistry at the University of Halle, proposes phlogiston theory in the way it comes to be generally understood.

== Earth sciences ==
- An early, crude seismograph is developed by the French physicist Abbé Jean de Hautefeuille.

== Mathematics ==
- Gottfried Leibniz publishes a first description of binary numbers in the West.
- Leonty Magnitsky's Arithmetic (Арифметика) is published, a scientific book in the Russian language.

== Meteorology ==
- December 7–10 (November 26–29 O.S.) – Great Storm of 1703, an extratropical cyclone, ravages southern England and the English Channel, killing at least 8,000, mostly at sea. The Eddystone Lighthouse off Plymouth is destroyed in the storm together with its designer Henry Winstanley.

== Institutions ==
- November 30 – Isaac Newton is elected president of the Royal Society of London, a position he will hold until his death in 1727.
- Richard Mead is admitted to the Royal Society (to whose Transactions he contributes this year a paper on the parasitic nature of scabies), is elected physician to St Thomas' Hospital, and is appointed to read anatomical lectures at Surgeon's Hall, all in London.

== Births ==
- January 8 – André Levret, French obstetrician (died 1780)
- January 15 – Johann Ernst Hebenstreit, German physician and naturalist (died 1757)
- June 21 – Joseph Lieutaud, French physician (died 1780)
- August 23 – Robert James, English physician (died 1776)
- September 15 – Guillaume-François Rouelle, French chemist and apothecary (died 1770)
- October 28 – Antoine Deparcieux, French mathematician (died 1768)
- November 25 – Jean-François Séguier, French astronomer and botanist (died 1784)
- December 2 – Ferdinand Konščak, Croatian explorer (died 1759)
- December 9 – Chester Moore Hall, English scientific instrument maker (died 1771)
- December 24 – Aleksei Chirikov, Russian explorer (died 1748)

== Deaths ==
- March 3 – Robert Hooke, English scientist (born 1635)
- March 20 (probable) – Johann von Löwenstern-Kunckel, German chemist (born 1630?)
- September 22 – Vincenzo Viviani, Italian mathematician and scientist (born 1622)
- October 28 – John Wallis, English mathematician (born 1616)
