= 1702 in science =

List of years in science	(table)
- … 1692; 1693; 1694; 1695; 1696; 1697; 1698; 1699; 1700; 1701; 1702; 1703; 1704; 1705; 1706; 1707; 1708; 1709; 1710; 1711; 1712 …
- Art; Archaeology; Architecture; Literature; Music; Philosophy; Science; +...

The year 1702 in science and technology involved some significant events.

== Astronomy ==
- April 20 – Comet of 1702 (C/1702 H1): The 10th-closest comet approach in history, it missed Earth by a distance of 0.0437 AU (6,537,000 km).
- May 5 – Globular cluster Messier 5 (M5, NGC 5904) is discovered by Gottfried Kirch and his wife Maria Margarethe.
- David Gregory publishes the first textbook, Astronomiae physicae et geometricae elementa, the first astronomy textbook based on Isaac Newton's principles of motions and theory of gravitation.

== Technology ==
- A fountain pen is developed by French instrument-maker Nicholas Bion.
- Pierre Varignon applies calculus to spring-driven clocks.

== Births ==
- November 5 – Edward Stone, English polymath (died 1768)
- Undated
  - Giuseppa Barbapiccola, Italian natural philosopher, poet and translator (died 1740)
  - Benjamin Stillingfleet, English botanist (died 1771)

== Deaths ==
- April – Clopton Havers, English physician who did pioneering research on the microstructure of bone (born 1657)
- December 12 – Olof Rudbeck, Swedish physiologist who discovered that the thoracic duct is connected to the intestinal lymphatics (born 1630)
