= 1777 in science =

List of years in science	(table)
- … 1767; 1768; 1769; 1770; 1771; 1772; 1773; 1774; 1775; 1776; 1777; 1778; 1779; 1780; 1781; 1782; 1783; 1784; 1785; 1786; 1787 …
- Art; Archaeology; Architecture; Literature; Music; Philosophy; Science; +...

The year 1777 in science and technology involved some significant events.

== Exploration ==
- March – Third voyage of James Cook: English explorer Captain Cook discovers Mangaia and Atiu in the Cook Islands.

== Mathematics ==
- Leonhard Euler introduces the symbol i to represent the square root of −1.

== Technology ==
- probable date – Thomas Arnold of London produces the first watch ("Arnold 36") to be called a chronometer.

== Awards ==
- Copley Medal: John Mudge

== Births ==
- February 12 – Bernard Courtois, French chemist (died 1838)
- April 30 – Carl Friedrich Gauss, German mathematician (died 1855)
- May 4 – Louis Jacques Thénard, French chemist (died 1857)
- May 18 – John George Children, English chemist, mineralogist and entomologist (died 1852)
- August 14 – Hans Christian Ørsted, Danish physicist (died 1851)

== Deaths ==
- September 22 – John Bartram, naturalist and explorer considered the "father of American botany" (born 1699)
- September 25 – Johann Heinrich Lambert, Swiss polymath (born 1728)
- December 7 – Albrecht von Haller, Swiss anatomist and physiologist (born 1708)
- Celia Grillo Borromeo, Italian scientist and mathematician (born 1684)
