= 1700 in philosophy =

List of years in philosophy
- … 1690; 1691; 1692; 1693; 1694; 1695; 1696; 1697; 1698; 1699; 1700; 1701; 1702; 1703; 1704; 1705; 1706; 1707; 1708; 1709; 1710 …
- Art; Archaeology; Architecture; Literature; Music; Philosophy; Science; +...

1700 in philosophy

== Events ==
- Gokulanatha Upadhyaya becomes court pandit to Maharaja Madhave Sinha of Mithila

== Births ==
- Johann Christoph Gottsched (died 1766)

== Publications ==
- Thomas Hyde, Historia religionis veterum Persarum, Oxford, 1700. In this work Hyde highlighted Zoroastrian and Persian philosophies to the West. He also coined the term dualism (Latin: dualismus) in this work.
- Giovanni Vincenzo Gravina (an early Italian empiricist), De Origine Juris Romani, 1700

== Bibliography ==
- Ganeri, Jonardon, The Lost Age of Reason: Philosophy in Early Modern India 1450-1700, Oxford University Press, 2014 ISBN 0191025887.
- Levitin, Dmitri, Ancient Wisdom in the Age of the New Science: Histories of Philosophy in England, c. 1640–1700, Cambridge University Press, 2015 ISBN 1107105889.
- Pingree, David, Census of the Exact Sciences in Sanskrit, Volume 1, American Philosophical Society, 1970 ISBN 0871690810.
- Ueberweg, Friedrich, History of Philosophy: History of modern philosophy, Scribner, Armstrong & Co, 1876 OCLC 1049800650
- Winston D., "The Iranian component of the Bible, Apocrypha, and Qumran: A Review of the Evidence", History of Religions, vol. 5, no. 2, pp. 183-216.
