= 1700s in archaeology =

List of years in archaeology	(table)
- … 1690; 1691; 1692; 1693; 1694; 1695; 1696; 1697; 1698; 1699; 1700; 1701; 1702; 1703; 1704; 1705; 1706; 1707; 1708; 1709; 1710 …
- In science 1697 1698 1699 1700 1701 1702 1703
- Art; Archaeology; Architecture; Literature; Music; Philosophy; Science; +...

The decade of the 1700s in archaeology involved some significant events.

== Excavations ==
- 1702: Heneage Finch excavates Julliberrie's Grave in Kent.

== Finds ==
- 1704: The Carpentras Stele, inscribed in the Phoenician alphabet, is found in southern France and published by Jean-Pierre Rigord as the first ancient Aramaic inscription ever published in full.
- 1709: The town of Herculaneum is discovered near Pompeii when digging of a well over the ancient amphitheater is attempted.

== Publications ==
- 1700: Abraham de la Pryme, "A Letter from the Reverend Mr Abraham de la Pryme, to the Very Reverend Dr G. D. of Y. and F.R.S. concerning Some Roman Antiquities in Lincolnshire", Philosophical Transactions of the Royal Society 22: pp. 561–567
- 1707: Robert Sibbald, Historical inquiries, concerning the Roman monuments and antiquities in the north part of Britain called Scotland

== Other events ==
- 1702: Repairs to the Pont du Gard in France are undertaken.
- 1707: 5 December - The Society of Antiquaries of London is founded.

== Births ==
- 1702: August 16 - Roque Joaquín de Alcubierre, Spanish-born military engineer and pioneer Classical archaeologist (d. 1780)

== Deaths ==
- 1702: April 22 - François Charpentier, French archaeologist (b. 1620)
- 1704: June 12 - Abraham de la Pryme, English antiquary (b. 1671)
- 1709: June 30 - Edward Lhuyd, Welsh antiquary (b. 1660)

Preceded by 1690s in archaeology	Archaeology timeline 1700s	Succeeded by 1710s in archaeology
