= 1699 in science =

List of years in science	(table)
- … 1689; 1690; 1691; 1692; 1693; 1694; 1695; 1696; 1697; 1698; 1699; 1700; 1701; 1702; 1703; 1704; 1705; 1706; 1707; 1708; 1709 …
- Art; Archaeology; Architecture; Literature; Music; Philosophy; Science; +...

The year 1699 in science and technology involved some significant events.

== Biology ==
- English physician Edward Tyson publishes Orang-Outang, sive Homo Sylvestris: or, the Anatomy of a Pygmie Compared with that of a Monkey, an Ape, and a Man, a pioneering work of comparative anatomy.

== Exploration ==
- July 26 – William Dampier's expedition to New Holland (Australia) in HMS Roebuck reaches Dirk Hartog Island at the mouth of what he calls Shark Bay in Western Australia and begins producing the first known detailed record of Australian flora and fauna.
- approx. date – Sir Isaac Newton develops a reflecting quadrant.

== Mathematics ==
- Abraham Sharp calculates π to 72 digits using an arctan sequence (although only 71 are correct).

== Paleontology ==
- Edward Lhuyd produces the first published scientific treatment of what would now be recognized as a dinosaur, describing and naming a sauropod tooth, "Rutellum implicatum" found at Caswell, near Witney, Oxfordshire, England.

== Births ==
- March 23 – John Bartram, naturalist and explorer, "father of American botany" (died 1777)
- August 17 – Bernard de Jussieu, French botanist (died 1777)
- September 12 – John Martyn, English botanist (died 1768)

== Deaths ==
- March 21 – Erhard Weigel, German mathematician and scientific populariser (born 1625)
- November 18 – Pierre Pomet, French pharmacist (born 1658)
