= 1771 in science =

List of years in science	(table)
- … 1761; 1762; 1763; 1764; 1765; 1766; 1767; 1768; 1769; 1770; 1771; 1772; 1773; 1774; 1775; 1776; 1777; 1778; 1779; 1780; 1781 …
- Art; Archaeology; Architecture; Literature; Music; Philosophy; Science; +...

The year 1771 in science and technology involved some significant events.

== Astronomy ==
- Lagrange discusses how numerous astronomical observations should be combined so as to give the most probable result.

== Chemistry ==
- British apothecary Thomas Henry invents a process for preparing magnesium oxide.

== Exploration ==
- August 17 – Edinburgh botanist James Robertson makes the first recorded ascent of Ben Nevis in Scotland.

== Mathematics ==
- Lagrange publishes his second paper on the general process for solving an algebraic equation of any degree via Lagrange resolvents; and proves Wilson's theorem that if n is a prime, then (n − 1)! + 1 is always a multiple of n.

== Medicine ==
- Norfolk and Norwich Hospital founded in England.

== Events ==
- March 15 – Society of Civil Engineers first meets (in London), the world's oldest engineering society.
- December 16 – French chemist Antoine Lavoisier (28) marries Marie-Anne Pierrette Paulze, not yet 14 and daughter of his senior in the Ferme générale.

== Publications ==
- Louis Antoine de Bougainville publishes Le voyage autour du monde, par la frégate La Boudeuse, et la flûte L'Étoile.
- Peter Simon Pallas begins publication of Reise durch verschiedene Provinzen des Russischen Reichs, chronicling his ongoing scientific expedition through the Russian Empire.
- Arthur Young publishes The Farmer's Kalendar.

== Awards ==
- Copley Medal: Matthew Raper

== Births ==
- April 13 – Richard Trevithick (died 1833), Cornish mechanical engineer and inventor.
- August 22 – Henry Maudslay (died 1831), English mechanical engineer and inventor.
- September 11 – Mungo Park (died 1806), Scottish explorer.
- October 13 – Gotthelf Fischer von Waldheim (died 1853), Saxon-born naturalist.
- November 6 – Alois Senefelder (died 1834), Prague-born German inventor of lithography.
- December 14 – Regina von Siebold (died 1849), German physician and obstetrician.

== Deaths ==
- February 20 – Jean-Jacques d'Ortous de Mairan, French geophysicist, astronomer and chronobiologist (born 1678)
- March 17 – Chester Moore Hall, English scientific instrument maker (born 1703)
- March 23 – Henry Hindley, English clock and scientific instrument maker (born c. 1701)
- December 6 – Giovanni Battista Morgagni, Italian anatomist (born 1682)
- December 15 – Benjamin Stillingfleet, English botanist (born 1702)
