= 2009 in science =

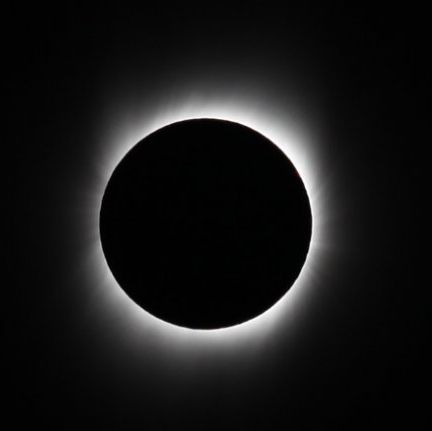
22 July 2009: the longest-lasting total solar eclipse of the 21st century occurs.

The year 2009 involved numerous significant scientific events and discoveries, some of which are listed below. 2009 was designated the International Year of Astronomy by the United Nations.

== Events, discoveries and inventions ==
=== January ===
- 1 January – In DNA nanotechnology, Arizona State University researchers Hao Yan and Yan Liu use nanoparticles to make 3D DNA nanotubes.
- 3 January – The Bitcoin cryptocurrency network is created when the developer known as Satoshi Nakamoto mines the genesis block of its blockchain.
- 6 January – NASA's Fermi Gamma-ray Space Telescope discovers 12 new gamma-ray-only pulsars, and has detected gamma-ray pulses from 18 others.
- 26 January – An annular solar eclipse takes place.
- January – The first animal from an extinct species to be recreated by cloning, a Pyrenean Ibex, is born alive, but dies seven minutes later due to physical defects in its lungs.

=== February ===
- 1 February – The Cospas-Sarsat satellite search-and-rescue system stops monitoring for outdated 121.5 MHz and 243 MHz (Class B) distress signals from EPIRBs and other emergency beacons.
- 2 February – Omid, Iran's first domestically built satellite, is successfully launched from Semnan Space Center into low Earth orbit; it re-enters the atmosphere on 25 April.
- 5 February – 28 individual fossils of the giant prehistoric snake T. cerrejonensis are discovered in the coal mines of Cerrejón, La Guajira, Colombia.
- 10 February – 2009 satellite collision: The first accidental hypervelocity collision between two intact satellites in low Earth orbit takes place when Iridium 33 and Kosmos 2251 collide and destroy each other over Siberia.
- 24 February – Comet Lulin, a non-periodic comet, makes its closest approach to Earth, peaking in brightness between magnitude +4 and magnitude +6.
- Iranian scientists find that the way in which traditional timber-framed constructions are built makes them earthquake-resistant.

=== March ===
- 7 March – The Kepler space observatory is successfully launched, and begins its search for exoplanets.
- 12 March – Dartmouth researchers have found a way to develop more robust “quantum gates,” which are the elementary building blocks of quantum circuits.
- 27 March – Iranian researches found that drinking hot tea causes oesophageal cancer.

=== April ===
- 3 April – Dr. Yinfa Ma develops a method for pre-cancer screening that uses urine samples for detection. Ma hopes to be able to predict types of cancer as well as severity.
- 4 April – A new method developed by Cornell biological engineers offers an efficient way to make proteins for use in medicine or industry without the use of live cells.
- 5 April – Japanese engineers build a childlike robot, the Child-robot with Biomimetic Body, or CB2, and report that it is slowly developing social skills by interacting with humans and watching their facial expressions, mimicking a mother-baby relationship.

=== May ===
- 11–24 May – STS-125, the last Space Shuttle mission to service the Hubble Space Telescope, takes place.
- 19 May – Paleontologists announce the discovery of Darwinius masillae, an evolutionary "missing link" with features similar to lemurs, monkeys, and humans.

=== July ===
- 22 July – A total solar eclipse – the longest-lasting total eclipse of the 21st century – takes place.
- 23 July – Two teams of Chinese researchers create live mice from induced pluripotent stem (iPS) cells.

=== September ===
- 3 September – Saturn's rings cross the plane of the Earth's orbit. This was the first such crossing since May 22, 1995, and another will not occur until March 23, 2025.
- 29 September – NASA's MESSENGER spacecraft makes its final flyby of Mercury, decreasing velocity enough for its orbital capture in 2011.

=== October ===
- 1 October – Paleontologists announce the discovery of an Ardipithecus ramidus fossil skeleton, deeming it the oldest fossil skeleton of a human ancestor yet found.
- 20 October – European astronomers discover 32 new exoplanets.

=== December ===
- 31 December
  - A partial lunar eclipse is visible from most of Africa, Europe, Asia, and Australia.
  - Sleeping Beauty Transposase SB 100X is announced as the Molecule of the Year 2009 by Isidro A. T. Savillo, President of the International Society for Molecular and Cell Biology and Biotechnology Protocols and Researches (ISMCBBPR).

== Prizes ==
=== Abel Prize ===
- 2009 Abel Prize: Mikhail Gromov

=== Nobel Prize ===
- 2009 Nobel Prize in Physiology or Medicine: Elizabeth H. Blackburn, Carol W. Greider and Jack W. Szostak
- 2009 Nobel Prize in Physics: Charles K. Kao, Willard Boyle and George E. Smith
- 2009 Nobel Prize in Chemistry: Venkatraman Ramakrishnan, Thomas A. Steitz and Ada E. Yonath

== Deaths ==
- 2 January – Olgierd Zienkiewicz, Polish-British civil engineer (b. 1921).
- 11 January – Frederic Richards, American biochemist and biophysicist known for solving the crystal structure of the ribonuclease S enzyme in 1967 and for defining the concept of solvent-accessible surface (b. 1925).
- 14 January – Aron Arthur Moscona, American developmental biologist (b. 1921).
- 26 January – Nina L. Etkin, American anthropologist and biologist (b. 1948).
- 30 January – Rudolf Trümpy, Swiss geologist (b. 1921).
- 11 February – Willem Johan Kolff, American physician, inventor of artificial organs (b. 1911).
- 2 March – Jacob T. Schwartz, American mathematician, and professor of computer science at the New York University Courant Institute of Mathematical Sciences (b. 1930).
- 11 March – David Medved, American physicist (b. 1926).
- 22 March – John L. Harper, British biologist, specializing in ecology and plant population biology (b. 1925).
- 9 April – Carl Rettenmeyer, American biologist who specialised in army ants (b. 1931).
- 2 May – Léopold Reichling, Luxembourg biologist and naturalist (b. 1921).
- 19 May – Robert F. Furchgott, American biochemist and Nobel laureate (b. 1916).
- 21 May – Albert (Ab) C. Perdeck, Dutch ornithologist, automobile accident (b. 1923).
- 31 May – Emil L. Smith, American biochemist who studied protein structure and function as well as biochemical evolution (b. 1911).
- 6 June – Jean Dausset, French immunologist and Nobel laureate (b. 1916).
- 8 June – Howard McKern, Australian analytical and organic chemist (b. 1917).
- 10 June – John A. Eddy, American astronomer (b. 1931).
- 20 June – Ralph F. Hirschmann, German American biochemist who led a team that was responsible for the first organic synthesis of an enzyme, a ribonuclease (b. 1922).
- 13 August – Laurel van der Wal, American aeronautical engineer (b. 1924).
- 29 August – Nicole Grasset, Swiss-French medical virologist, microbiologist and epidemiologist (b. 1927).
- 9 September
  - Patricia Bergquist, New Zealand scientist who specialized in anatomy and taxonomy (b. 1933).
  - Aage Niels Bohr, Danish nuclear physicist and Nobel laureate (b. 1922).
- 12 September – Norman Borlaug, American agronomist, humanitarian and Nobel laureate (b. 1914).
- 18 September – Mahlon Hoagland, American biochemist who discovered transfer RNA (tRNA) (b. 1921).
- 6 October – Ruth L. Kirschstein, American pathologist and science administrator at the National Institutes of Health (NIH) (b. 1926).
- 14 October – Francis Muguet, French chemist who advocated open access to information (b. 1955).
- 18 October – Ignacio Ponseti, Menorcan-born pediatric orthopedist (b. 1914).
- 27 October – Paul Zamecnik, American scientist who played a central role in the early history of molecular biology (b. 1912).
- 29 October – Bei Shizhang, Chinese biologist and founder of the Institute of Biophysics, Chinese Academy of Sciences (b. 1903).
- 8 November – Vitaly Ginzburg, Soviet and Russian theoretical physicist, astrophysicist, Nobel laureate, a member of the Soviet and Russian Academies of Sciences and one of the developers of the Soviet hydrogen bomb.
- 3 November – Warren Lyford DeLano, American bioinformatician and open source advocate (b. 1972).
- 9 November – Don Beaven, New Zealand medical researcher in the area of diabetes treatment and prevention (b. 1924).
- 29 November – Andrew Donald Booth, British physicist and computer scientist (b. 1918).
- 3 December – Brian Harold Mason, New Zealand-born geochemist and mineralogist, pioneer in the study of meteorites (b. 1917).
- 8 December – Remy Chauvin, French biologist and entomologist (b. 1913).
- 17 December – Samuel Victor Perry, English biochemist who was a pioneer in the field of muscle biochemistry (b. 1918).
- 21 December – Edwin G. Krebs, American biochemist and Nobel laureate (b. 1918).

== See also ==
- List of years in science
- 2009 in spaceflight
- List of emerging technologies
