= 1898 in science =

The year 1898 in science and technology involved some significant events, listed below.

== Archaeology ==
- The Narmer Palette is discovered in Hierakonpolis, Egypt.

== Astronomy ==
- Annie Scott Dill Maunder photographs the Sun's outer corona during a solar eclipse in India.
- 433 Eros, the first near-Earth object, is discovered.
- George Darwin proposes that the Earth and Moon had once been one body.

== Biology ==
- March 26 – The Sabi Game Reserve in South Africa, the first officially designated game reserve, is created.

== Chemistry ==
- William Ramsay and Morris Travers discover the noble gases krypton (May 30), neon (June 7) and xenon (July 12) at University College London.
- July 28 – Marie and Pierre Curie announce (at the French Academy of Sciences) discovery of a substance they call Polonium.
- December 26 – Marie and Pierre Curie announce discovery of a substance they call radium. It is the only moment where 5 elements are discovered the same year.
- Emil Fischer synthesizes purine.
- Richard Willstätter analyzes the structure of the cocaine molecule in a synthesis derived from tropinone.
- Polycarbonates are first discovered by German chemist Alfred Einhorn.
- Polyethylene is first synthesized by German chemist Hans von Pechmann.

== Exploration ==
- January 30–February 13 – The Belgian Antarctic Expedition led by Adrien de Gerlache on the Belgica discovers the Gerlache Strait (originally named the Belgica Strait) and Lemaire Channel off the west coast of Graham Land on the Antarctic Peninsula. The expedition then becomes the first to winter in Antarctica.

== Mathematics ==
- Ladislaus Bortkiewicz publishes a book about the Poisson distribution, The Law of Small Numbers, first noting that events with low frequency in a large population follow a Poisson distribution even when the probabilities of the events vary.

== Meteorology ==
- Vilhelm Bjerknes produces the primitive equations used in climate modeling.

== Physiology and medicine ==
- June 23 – Royal Army Medical Corps formed within the British Army.
- October 28 – French serial killer Joseph Vacher is convicted, based largely on forensic evidence presented by Alexandre Lacassagne.
- Paul Flechsig divides the cytoarchitecture of the human brain into 40 areas.
- Peter Borovsky, a Russian military surgeon working in Tashkent, publishes the first accurate description of the causative parasite for "Sart sore" (later known as leishmaniasis).
- Patrick Manson publishes Tropical Diseases: a manual of the diseases of warm climates in London, a pioneering English language textbook in tropical medicine.

== Technology ==
- The semi-automatic Luger pistol is patented by Georg Luger.
- The telegraphone, a magnetic wire recording machine, is patented by Valdemar Poulsen.

== Awards ==
- Copley Medal: William Huggins
- Wollaston Medal for Geology: Ferdinand Zirkel

== Births ==
- January 10 – Katharine Burr Blodgett (died 1979), American physicist and chemist.
- February – Guy Stewart Callendar (died 1964), English-Canadian thermodynamic engineer and climatologist.
- February 11 – Leó Szilárd (died 1964), Hungarian-American physicist.
- February 25 – William Astbury (died 1961), English physicist and molecular biologist.
- March 3 – Emil Artin (died 1962), Austrian-born mathematician.
- June 26 – Willy Messerschmitt (died 1978), German aeronautical engineer.
- July 29 – Isidor Isaac Rabi (died 1988), Galician-born American physicist, winner of the Nobel Prize in Physics in 1944 for invention of the atomic beam magnetic resonance method of measuring magnetic properties of atoms and molecules.
- August 1 – Mildred Creak (died 1993), English child psychologist.
- August 3 – Karl Kehrle (Brother Adam, died 1996), German-born Benedictine monk and beekeeper.
- August 28 – Albert Claude (died 1983), Belgian engineer, scientist, winner of the Nobel Prize in Physiology or Medicine in 1974 for discoveries concerning the structures and functional organization of the cell.
- September 10 – Waldo Semon (died 1999), American inventor.
- November 16 – Warren Sturgis McCulloch (died 1969), American neurophysiologist and cybernetician.
- November 19 – Arthur R. von Hippel (died 2003), German-born American physicist
- December 11 – Benno Mengele (died 1971), Austrian electrical engineer

== Deaths ==
- January 7 – Joseph O'Dwyer (born 1841), American physician.
- February 28 (Old Style March 12) – Fyodor Pirotsky (born 1845), Ukrainian-born Russian military and electrical engineer and inventor.
- March 12 – Johann Balmer (born 1825), Swiss mathematician.
- March 15 – Henry Bessemer (born 1813), English inventor of the Bessemer process for steelmaking.
- May 29 – Lyon Playfair, 1st Baron Playfair (born 1818), Scottish chemist.
- August 27 – John Hopkinson (born 1849), English electrical engineer (killed in climbing accident).
- September 14 – William Seward Burroughs (born 1855), American inventor of the adding machine.
- November 20 – Sir John Fowler, 1st Baronet (born 1817), English civil engineer.
