= 1926 in science =

The year 1926 in science and technology involved some significant events, listed below.

== Astronomy and space exploration ==
- March 16 – Robert Goddard launches the first liquid-fueled rocket, at Auburn, Massachusetts. This is considered by some to be the start of the space age, although his rocket did not reach outer space.

== Biology ==
- August 7 – American herpetologist G.K. Noble publishes a demonstration that Paul Kammerer's claims to have shown Lamarckian inheritance in the midwife toad suffer from falsification of evidence.
- American microbiologist Selman Waksman publishes Enzymes.
- The Quarterly Review of Biology is established by Raymond Pearl in the United States.

== Chemistry ==
- Waldo Semon and the B.F. Goodrich Company develop a method of plasticizing polyvinyl chloride, giving it commercial potential.
- Graham Edgar originates the octane rating system for automotive fuel.
- Phencyclidine (PCP, angel dust) is first synthesized.

== Earth sciences ==
- Vladimir Vernadsky popularises the concept of the biosphere in a book (in Russian) of this title.

== Exploration ==
- May 12 – Roald Amundsen, Umberto Nobile and crew fly over the North Pole in the airship Norge.

== Mathematics ==
- Otakar Borůvka publishes Borůvka's algorithm, introducing the greedy algorithm.

== Medicine ==
- First vaccine for pertussis.
- American biogerontologist Raymond Pearl publishes his book Alcohol and Longevity demonstrating that drinking alcohol in moderation is associated with greater longevity than either abstaining or drinking heavily.
- Finnish physician Erik Adolf von Willebrand first describes Hereditär pseudohemofili ("Hereditary pseudohemophilia"), later known as Von Willebrand disease.
- German-Jewish dermatologist Walter Freudenthal gives the earliest clear histopathological description of keratoma senile (actinic keratosis), distinguishing it from verruca senilis (seborrheic keratosis), in Breslau.
- The description 'glioblastoma multiforme' is introduced by Percival Bailey and Harvey Cushing.

== Meteorology ==
- Wasaburo Oishi first describes the jet stream.

== Paleontology ==
- Gerhard Heilmann publishes The Origin of Birds (in English) on bird evolution.

== Physics ==
- Wolfgang Pauli uses Werner Heisenberg's matrix theory of quantum mechanics to derive the observed spectrum of the hydrogen atom.

== Technology ==
- January 26 – Scottish inventor John Logie Baird demonstrates his pioneering greyscale mechanical television system (which he calls a "televisor") at his London laboratory for members of the Royal Institution and a reporter from The Times.
- February – Hidetsugu Yagi and Shintaro Uda publish the first description of the Yagi–Uda antenna.
- June 28 – A patent for an electric percussion fuse for explosive projectiles, invented by Herbert Rühlemann, is filed in Germany.
- July
  - Alan A. Griffith publishes An Aerodynamic Theory of Turbine Design, proposing an airfoil shape for turbine blades.
  - Carl Zeiss, Jena, open a planetarium housed in a geodesic dome designed by Walther Bauersfeld.
- November 23 – The aerosol spray can is patented by Erik Rotheim, a Norwegian chemical engineer.
- The Einstein refrigerator is invented by Albert Einstein and Leo Szilard.
- Ulster-born engineer Harry Ferguson is granted a British patent for his 'Duplex' hitch linking tractor and plough.
- German engineer Andreas Stihl patents and develops an electric chainsaw.

== Awards ==
- Nobel Prizes
  - Physics – Jean Baptiste Perrin
  - Chemistry – Theodor Svedberg
  - Medicine – Johannes Andreas Grib Fibiger
- Copley Medal: Frederick Hopkins
- Wollaston Medal for Geology: Henry Fairfield Osborn

== Births ==
- January 11 – Lev Dyomin (died 1998), Soviet Russian cosmonaut.
- January 29 – Abdus Salam (died 1996), Punjabi theoretical physicist.
- February – David Medved (died 2009), American physicist.
- March 7 – Margaret Weston (died 2021), English electrical engineer and Director of the Science Museum, London.
- April 3 – Gus Grissom (died 1967), American astronaut.
- May 1 – Eva Siracká (died 2023), Slovak physician
- May 8 – David Attenborough, English broadcaster and naturalist.
- May 17 – Franz Sondheimer (died 1981), German-born British chemist
- June 19 – Erna Schneider Hoover, American computer technologist.
- June 23 – Lawson Soulsby (died 2017), English parasitologist.
- July 27 – W. David Kingery (died 2000), American materials scientist specializing in ceramic materials.
- July 31
  - Bernard Nathanson (died 2011), American medical doctor and activist.
  - Hilary Putnam (died 2016), American philosopher, mathematician and computer scientist.
- August 11 – Sir Aaron Klug (died 2018), Lithuanian-born British biophysicist and chemist.
- August 19 – George Daniels (died 2011), English horologist.
- September 4 – George William Gray (died 2013), Scottish chemist, discoverer of stable liquid crystal materials leading to the development of liquid-crystal displays.
- September 7 – Donald Pinkel (died 2022), American pediatric hematologist and oncologist.
- September 15 – Jean-Pierre Serre, French mathematician.
- October 2 – Michio Suzuki (died 1998), Japanese mathematician.
- October 12 – Ruth L. Kirschstein (died 2009), American pathologist and science administrator at the National Institutes of Health.
- October 31 – Narinder Singh Kapany (died 2020), Punjabi-born physicist.
- November 29 – Dilhan Eryurt (died 2012), Turkish astrophysicist.
- December 10 – Neena Schwartz (died 2018), American endocrinologist.
- Rosemary Fowler, English physicist.

== Deaths ==
- March 5 – Clément Ader (born 1841), French engineer and inventor, airplane pioneer.
- April 11 – Luther Burbank (born 1849), American plant breeder.
- May 8 – Stephen Paget (born 1855), English surgeon.
- July 21 – Washington Roebling (born 1837), American civil engineer.
- September 23 – Paul Kammerer (born 1880), Austrian Lamarckian biologist (suicide).
- October 7 – Emil Kraepelin (born 1856), German psychiatrist.
- October 10 – Clara H. Hasse (born 1880), American botanist.
- October 19 – Victor Babeș (born 1854), Romanian physician and bacteriologist.
- November 26 – John Browning (born 1855), American firearms designer.
