= 1902 in science =

The year 1902 in science and technology involved some significant events, listed below.

== Aeronautics ==
- May 15 – Lyman Gilmore claims to have flown his steam-powered fixed-wing aircraft, although his proof is supposedly destroyed in a 1935 fire.

== Chemistry ==
- Hermann Emil Fischer and Joseph von Mering discover that barbitone (barbital or Veronal) is an effective hypnotic agent. It becomes the first commercially marketed barbiturate, being used as a treatment for insomnia from 1903.
- Auguste Verneuil develops the Verneuil process for making synthetic rubies.
- German chemist Wilhelm Ostwald develops and patents the Ostwald process for making nitric acid.

== Earth sciences ==
- April–August – Eruption of Mount Pelée in Martinique.
- Mercalli intensity scale introduced as a seismic scale for earthquakes by Giuseppe Mercalli.

== Exploration ==
- July 14 - Peruvian explorer Agustín Lizárraga rediscovers the Inca citadel of Machu Picchu, Peru
- December 30 – Discovery Expedition: British explorers Scott, Shackleton and Wilson reach the furthest southern point reached thus far by man, south of 82°S.

== Genetics ==
- Walter Sutton (in the United States) and Theodor Boveri (in Germany) independently develop the Boveri–Sutton chromosome theory, explaining the mechanism underlying the laws of Mendelian inheritance by identifying chromosomes as the carriers of genetic material.

== History of science ==
- May 17 – Archaeologist Valerios Stais identifies the Antikythera mechanism, now considered to be the oldest known analog computer.

== Mathematics ==
- June 16 – Bertrand Russell writes to Gottlob Frege informing him of the problem in naive set theory that will become known as Russell's paradox.
- Gyula Farkas publishes the first proof of Farkas' lemma.
- Henri Lebesgue introduces the theory of Lebesgue integration.

== Medicine ==
- January 1 – Nurses Registration Act 1901 comes into effect in New Zealand, making it the first country in the world to require state registration of nurses. On January 10, Ellen Dougherty becomes the world's first registered nurse.
- February – A commission on yellow fever in the United States announces that the disease is carried by mosquitoes.

== Paleontology ==
- Remains of the second Tyrannosaurus rex specimen, the first recognized as such, are excavated by Barnum Brown in the Hell Creek Formation of Montana.

== Physics ==
- Oliver Heaviside and Arthur E. Kennelly independently predict the existence of what will become known as the Kennelly-Heaviside Layer of the ionosphere.
- James Jeans finds the length scale required for gravitational perturbations to grow in a static nearly homogeneous medium.
- Philipp Lenard observes that maximum photoelectron energies are independent of illuminating intensity but depend on frequency.
- Gilbert N. Lewis develops the cubical atom atomic model.
- Theodor Svedberg suggests that fluctuations in molecular bombardment cause the Brownian motion.

== Physiology ==
- William Bayliss and Ernest Starling make the first discovery of a hormone, secretin.

== Psychology ==
- Vienna Psychoanalytic Society begins to meet as the Wednesday Psychological Society in Sigmund Freud's apartment.

== Technology ==
- January 1 – Nathan Stubblefield demonstrates his wireless telephone device in Kentucky.
- April 13 – A new land speed record of 74 mph (119 km/h) is set in Nice, France, by Léon Serpollet driving a steam car.
- July 17 – Willis Carrier devises the first modern air conditioning system for a plant in New York City.
- December 10 – Old Aswan Dam, designed by William Willcocks, completed across the River Nile in Egypt.
- First Vierendeel bridge built, across the Scheldt at Avelgem in Belgium.

== Zoology ==
- October – First Mountain gorillas (Gorilla beringei beringei) discovered by Captain Robert von Beringe in German East Africa.

== Institutions ==
- January 28 – The Carnegie Institution is founded in Washington, D.C., to promote scientific research with a $10 million gift from Andrew Carnegie.

== Awards ==
- Nobel Prizes
  - Physics – Hendrik Lorentz, Pieter Zeeman
  - Chemistry – Hermann Emil Fischer
  - Medicine – Ronald Ross
- Hughes Medal first awarded by the Royal Society of London to J. J. Thomson
- June 26 – First recipients of the Order of Merit in the United Kingdom include
  - Lord Rayleigh
  - Lord Kelvin
  - Lord Lister
  - Sir William Huggins

== Births ==
- February 10 – Walter Houser Brattain (died 1987), American physicist.
- February 16 – Zhang Yuzhe (died 1986), Chinese astronomer.
- May 25 – Calvin Souther Fuller (died 1994), American physical chemist at AT&T Bell Laboratories.
- June 14 – Paul Lester Errington (died 1962), American conservationist.
- June 15 – Erik Erikson, né Salomonsen (died 1994), German-born psychologist.
- August 8 – Paul Dirac (died 1984), English physicist.
- August 13 – Felix Wankel (died 1988), German mechanical engineer.
- November 2 – Sergey Lebedev (died 1974), Russian computer scientist.
- Remziye Hisar, (died 1992), Turkish chemist.

== Deaths ==
- January 23 – Alfred William Bennett, British botanist (born 1833)
- February 11 – Caroline Rosenberg (born 1810) Danish botanist.
- March 6 – Moritz Kaposi (born 1837), Hungarian dermatologist.
- April 12 – Alfred Cornu (born 1841), French physicist
- May 26 – Almon Strowger (born 1839), American telecommunications engineer.
- September 5 – Rudolf Virchow (born 1821), German pathologist and biologist.
- September 18 – Thorborg Rappe (born 1832), Swedish pioneer in the education of students with Intellectual disability.
- November 12 – William Henry Barlow (born 1812), English railway civil engineer.
- December 22 – Richard von Krafft-Ebing (born 1840), German sexologist.
