= Wilhelm Friedrich von Gleichen =

German biologist (1717-1783)

Wilhelm Friedrich von Gleichen-Rußwurm (1717–1783), Stablemaster of the Margrave of Bayreuth, was a German biologist. In 1778 he developed a process of staining micro-organisms with indigo and carmine (Abhandlung über die Saamen - und Infusionsthierchen, und über die Erzeugung, nebst mikroskopischen Beobachtungen des Saamens der Thiere in verschiedenen Infusionen - Treatise on seed and infusoria, and their production, along with microscopic observations of the semen of animals in different suspensions).

The fern genus Gleichenia was named in his honour.

== Publications ==
- Drosophila : a contribution to its morphology and development - W. F. von Gleichen, 1764 A description of Drosophila melanogaster edited in 1764 by Johann Christoph Keller (1737-1796) who also engraved the accompanying copper-plate.
- Dissertation sur la génération, les animalcules spermatiques, et ceux d'infusions, avec des observations microscopiques sur le sperme et sur différentes infusions - Gleichen-Russwurm, Wilhelm Friedrich, Freiherr von, 1717-1783
- Auserlesene mikroskopische Entdeckungen bey den Pflanzen, Blumen und Blüthen, Insekten und andern Merkwürdigkeiten : mit illuminirten Kupfertafeln - Nürnberg, 1777
- Von Entstehung, Bildung, Umbildung Und Bestimmung Des Erdkörpers...
- Mikroskopische Untersuchungen und Beobachtungen der geheimen Zeugungstheile der Pflanzen in ihren Blüten, und der in denselben befindlichen Insekten - Nürnberg, Raspe, 1790
