= 1911 in science =

The year 1911 in science and technology involved some significant events, listed below.

== Astronomy ==
- June 28 – The Nakhla meteorite (from Mars) lands in the area of Alexandria, Egypt, purportedly killing a dog. It suggests the first signs of water on Mars.

== Conservation ==
- May 19 – Parks Canada, the world's first national park service, is established as the Dominion Parks Branch under the Department of the Interior.
- July 7 – The United States, Russia, the United Kingdom and Japan, meeting in Washington, D.C., sign the North Pacific Fur Seal Convention of 1911, prohibiting open-water seal hunting of the endangered fur seal in the North Pacific Ocean, the first international treaty to address wildlife conservation issues. In the next six years, the seal population increases by 30%.

== Geology ==
- January 3 – 1911 Kebin earthquake: An earthquake of 7.7 moment magnitude strikes near Almaty in Russian Turkestan.

== Exploration ==
- July 24 – American explorer Hiram Bingham III rediscovers the Inca citadel of Machu Picchu, Peru, and introduces it to the world.
- December 14 – Norwegian explorer Roald Amundsen and a team of four become the first people to reach the South Pole.

== Mathematics ==
- Robert Remak's doctoral dissertation Über die Zerlegung der endlichen Gruppen in indirekte unzerlegbare Faktoren establishes that any two decompositions of a finite group into a direct product are related by a central automorphism.
- Traian Lalescu publishes Introduction to the Theory of Integral Equations, the first ever monograph on the subject of integral equations.

== Medicine ==
- Eugen Bleuler expands on his definition of schizophrenia as a condition distinct from Dementia praecox, in Dementia Praecox oder Gruppe der Schizophrenien.

== Physics ==
- April 8 – Heike Kamerlingh Onnes discovers the phenomenon of superconductivity.
- June 24–30 – Domenico Pacini runs a series of measurements of underwater ionization in the Gulf of Genoa, demonstrating that the radiation later recognised as cosmic rays cannot be originated by the Earth's crust.
- October – The first Solvay Congress of physicists convenes.
- Ernest Rutherford explains the Geiger–Marsden experiment and derives the Rutherford cross section by deducing the existence of a compact atomic nucleus from scattering experiments. He proposes the Rutherford model of the atom and demonstrates that J. J. Thomson's plum pudding model is incorrect.
- Charles Wilson finishes a sophisticated cloud chamber.

== Psychology ==
- The Ponzo illusion, a geometrical-optical illusion, is first demonstrated by Italian psychologist Mario Ponzo.

== Technology ==
- January 18 – Eugene Ely lands on the deck of the USS Pennsylvania anchored in San Francisco Bay, the first aircraft landing on a ship.
- June 5 – Charles F. Kettering files a United States patent for an electric starter motor.
- November 4 – MS Selandia, the first large ocean-going diesel ship, is launched in Denmark; Ivar Knudsen is the diesel engineer. The 1909-launched Dutch diesel tanker Vulcanus also enters service this year.
- John Joseph Rawlings files a United Kingdom patent for a wall plug.
- The Lewis automatic light machine gun is invented by United States Army Colonel Isaac Newton Lewis, based on initial work by Samuel Maclean.

== Other events ==
- March–May – A serialized version of Frederick Winslow Taylor's monograph The Principles of Scientific Management appears in The American Magazine, boosting the efficiency movement.

== Awards ==
- Nobel Prizes
  - Physics – Wilhelm Wien
  - Chemistry – Marie Curie
  - Medicine – Allvar Gullstrand

== Births ==
- January 26 – Polykarp Kusch (died 1993), German-born molecular physicist, winner of the Nobel Prize in Physics.
- February 14 – Willem Johan Kolff (died 2009), Dutch inventor of hemodialysis.
- March 26 – Bernard Katz (died 2003), German-born biophysicist, winner of the Nobel Prize in Physiology or Medicine.
- April 3 – Michael Woodruff (died 2001), English pioneer of organ transplant surgery.
- April 6 – Feodor Lynen (died 1979), German biochemist, winner of the Nobel Prize in Physiology or Medicine.
- April 8 – Melvin Calvin (died 1997), American biochemist, winner of the Nobel Prize in Chemistry.
- April 16 – William T. Stearn (died 2001), English botanist.
- April 18 – Maurice Goldhaber (died 2011), Austrian-born American physicist.
- May 22 – Anatol Rapoport (died 2007), Russian-born mathematical psychologist.
- June 13 – Luis Alvarez (died 1988), American experimental physicist, winner of the Nobel Prize in Physics.
- June 25 – William Howard Stein (died 1980), American biochemist, winner of the Nobel Prize in Chemistry.
- July 3 – Herbert E. Grier (died 1999), American electrical engineer.
- July 4 – Frederick Seitz (died 2008), American solid-state physicist.
- July 5 – Emil L. Smith (died 2009), American biochemist studying protein structure and function and biochemical evolution.
- July 9 – John A. Wheeler (died 2008), American theoretical physicist.
- August 9 – William A. Fowler (died 1995), American nuclear and astrophysicist, winner of the Nobel Prize in Physics.
- August 29 – John Charnley (died 1982), English orthopaedic surgeon.
- September 29 – R. V. Jones (died 1997), English physicist, expert in electronic military defence.
- October 5 – Pierre Dansereau (died 2011), French Canadian ecologist.
- November 27 – Fe del Mundo (died 2011), Filipino pediatrician and National Scientist of the Philippines.
- December 14 – Hans von Ohain (died 1998), German aeronautical engineer.
- December 23 – Niels Kaj Jerne (died 1994), English-born Danish immunologist, winner of the Nobel Prize in Physiology or Medicine.

== Deaths ==
- January 17 – Sir Francis Galton (born 1822), English explorer and biologist.
- February 15 – Theodor Escherich (born 1857), German-born pediatric bacteriologist.
- March 1 – Jacobus van 't Hoff (born 1852), Dutch chemist.
- May 21 – Williamina Fleming (born 1857), American astronomer.
- May 24 – Ernst Remak (born 1849), German neurologist.
- June 26 – Signe Häggman (born 1863), Finnish pioneer of physical education of disabled people.
- December 2 – George Davidson (born 1825), English-born geodesist, astronomer, geographer, surveyor and engineer in the United States.
- December 10 – Joseph Dalton Hooker (born 1817), English botanist.
- December 13 (O.S. November 30) – Nikolay Beketov (born 1827), Russian chemist.
