= 1837 in science =

The year 1837 in science and technology involved some significant events, listed below.

== Biology ==
- January 10 – John Gould reports to the Zoological Society of London that bird specimens brought by Charles Darwin from the Galápagos Islands which Darwin had thought were blackbirds, "gross-bills" and finches are in fact "a series of ground Finches which are so peculiar" as to form "an entirely new group, containing 12 species", an important step in the inception of Darwin's theory.
- March–July – Charles Darwin begins privately to develop his theory of transmutation of species.
- November 6 – Establishment of the Public Garden in Boston (Massachusetts), as a botanical garden, the first in the United States to be open to the general public.

== Mathematics ==
- Peter Gustav Lejeune Dirichlet publishes Dirichlet's theorem on arithmetic progressions, using mathematical analysis concepts to tackle an algebraic problem and thus creating the branch of analytic number theory. In proving the theorem, he introduces the Dirichlet characters and L-functions. He also notes the difference between the absolute and conditional convergence of series and its impact in what will later be called the Riemann series theorem.
- Bernard Bolzano publishes Wissenschaftslehre.
- William Rowan Hamilton treats complex numbers as ordered pairs of real numbers.
- Siméon Denis Poisson's lectures on probability (introducing Poisson distribution) and decision theory are published.
- Pierre Wantzel proves that several ancient geometric problems (including doubling the cube and trisecting the angle) are impossible to solve using only compass and straightedge.

== Physics ==
- Michael Faraday introduces the concept of lines of force.

== Technology ==
- February 25 – Thomas Davenport obtains the first United States patent on an electric motor.
- May – Samuel Morse patents his telegraph and exhibits it to the United States Congress.
- June 12 – Cooke and Wheatstone file their patent for the electrical telegraph in the United Kingdom.
- July 19 – Isambard Kingdom Brunel's paddle steamer SS Great Western is launched in Bristol.
- July – Godefroy Engelmann of Mulhouse patents chromolithography.
- November 18 – William Crompton patents the cotton power loom in the United States.
- Louis Daguerre's daguerreotype L'Atelier de l'artiste is said to be the earliest known photographic image successfully to undergo the full process of exposure, development and fixation.
- Camille Polonceau patents the Polonceau truss.
- The first electric locomotive built is a miniature battery locomotive constructed by chemist Robert Davidson of Aberdeen in Scotland, and powered by galvanic cells (batteries).

== Publications ==
- Bernard Bolzano publishes his Wissenschaftslehre ("Theory of Science").
- Andrew Ure publishes his encyclopedia A Dictionary of Arts, Manufactures and Mines in the United Kingdom.

== Awards ==
- Copley Medal: Antoine-César Becquerel; John Frederic Daniell
- Wollaston Medal: Proby Thomas Cautley; Hugh Falconer

== Births ==
- January 16 – Ellen Russell Emerson (died 1907), American ethnologist.
- January 17 – François Lenormant (died 1883), French assyriologist and numismatist.
- January 19 – William Williams Keen (died 1932), American physician.
- January 27 – Eduard von Hofmann (died 1897), Austrian forensic pathologist.
- March 7 – Henry Draper (died 1882), American physician and astronomer, pioneer of astrophotography.
- March 23 – Richard Anthony Proctor (died 1888), English astronomer.
- April 3 – John Burroughs (died 1921), American naturalist.
- April 27 – Paul Gordan (died 1912), German Jewish mathematician, "the king of invariant theory".
- May 26 – Washington Roebling (died 1926), American civil engineer.
- June 20 – Paul Bachmann (died 1920), German mathematician.
- July 21 – Johanna Hedén (died 1912), Swedish midwife and surgeon.
- September 8 – Raphael Pumpelly (died 1923), American geologist and explorer.
- October 23 – Moritz Kaposi (died 1902), Hungarian dermatologist.
- November 4 – James Douglas (died 1918), Canadian-born metallurgist.
- November 14 – Lucas Barrett (died 1862), Canadian-born British naturalist.
- November 23 – Johannes Diderik van der Waals (died 1923), Dutch theoretical physicist.
- November 28 – John Wesley Hyatt (died 1920), American inventor and industrial chemist.

== Deaths ==
- February 1 – Edward Donovan (born 1768), Anglo-Irish naturalist.
- February 4 – John Latham (born 1740), English physician, naturalist and "grandfather of Australian ornithology".
- February 16 – Gottfried Reinhold Treviranus (born 1776), German naturalist and advocate of transmutation.
- February 19 – Georg Büchner (born 1813), German-born writer and anatomist (typhus).
