= 1783 in science =

The year 1783 in science and technology involved some significant events:

== Astronomy ==
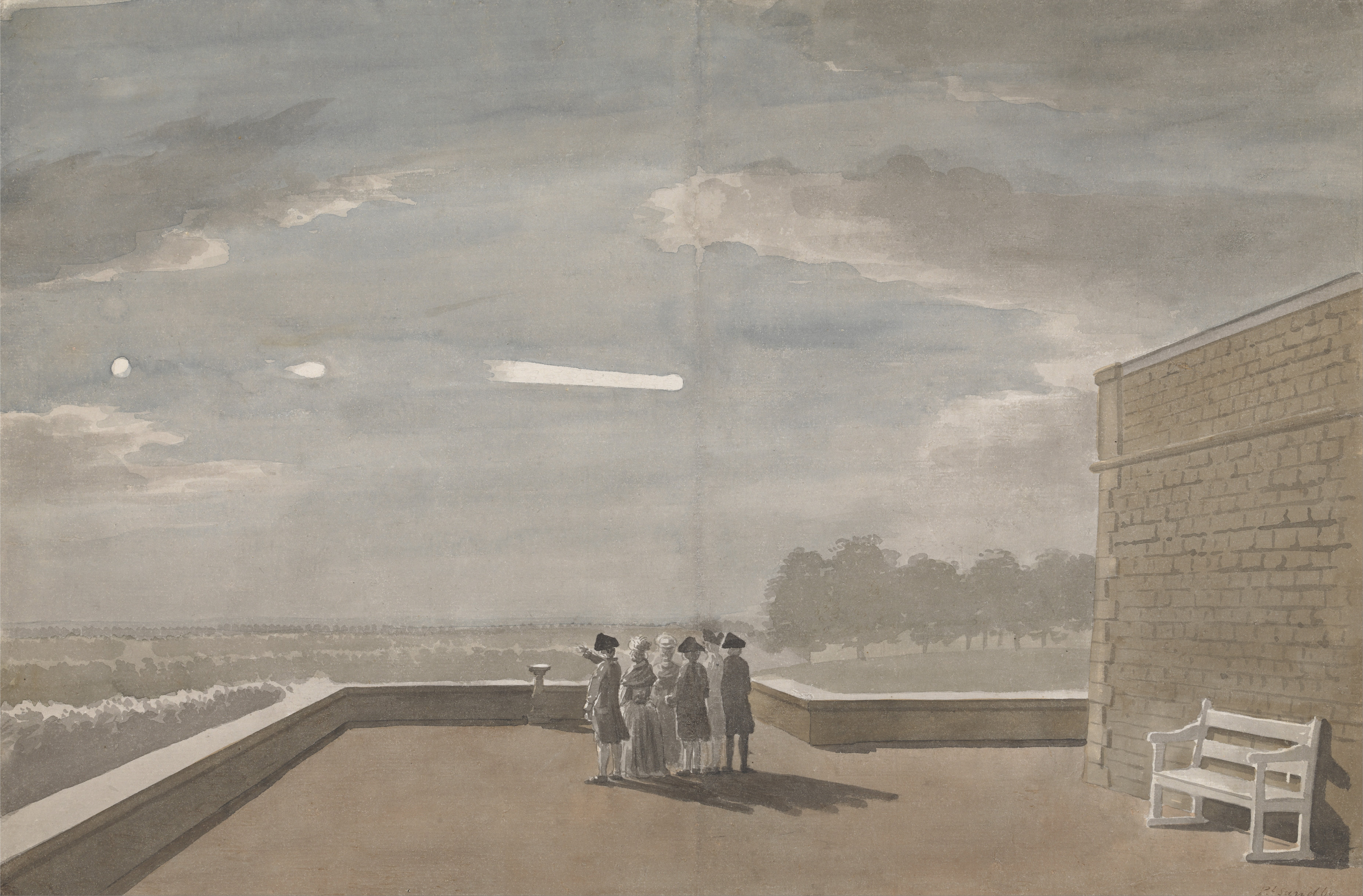
The Meteor of August 18, 1783, as seen from the East Angle of the North Terrace, Windsor Castle, watercolour by Paul Sandby

- February 26 – Caroline Herschel discovers NGC 2360.
- May – John Goodricke presents his conclusions that the variable star Algol is what comes to be known as an eclipsing binary to the Royal Society of London.
- August 18 – Great Meteor passes over Great Britain, exciting scientific interest.
- November 27 – John Michell proposes the existence of black holes ("dark stars").
- Jérôme Lalande publishes a revised edition of John Flamsteed’s star catalogue in an ephemeris, Éphémérides des mouvemens célestes, numbering the stars consecutively by constellation, the system which becomes known as "Flamsteed designations".

== Aviation ==
- June 5 – The Montgolfier brothers send up at Annonay, near Lyon, a 900 m linen hot air balloon as a public demonstration. Its flight covers 2 km and lasts 10 minutes, to an estimated altitude of 1600–2000 metres.
- August 27 – Jacques Charles and the Robert brothers launch the first hydrogen balloon in Paris.
- November 21 – The first free flight by humans in a balloon is made by Pilâtre de Rozier and Marquis d'Arlandes who fly aloft for 25 minutes about 100 metres above Paris for a distance of 9 km.
- December 26 – Louis-Sébastien Lenormand makes the first ever recorded public demonstration of a parachute descent by jumping from the tower of the Montpellier observatory in France using his rigid-framed model which he intends as a form of fire escape.

== Botany ==
- Jean Baptiste François Pierre Bulliard publishes his Dictionnaire Elémentaire de Botanique, contributing to the spread of Linnaean terminology, particularly in mycology.
- Erasmus Darwin begins publication of A System of Vegetables, a translation of Linnaeus in which he coins many common English language names of plants.

== Chemistry ==
- Antoine Lavoisier publishes Réflexions sur le phlogistique, showing the phlogiston theory to be inconsistent, proposing chemical reaction as an alternative theory in a paper read to the French Academy of Sciences in June, names hydrogen and demonstrates that water is a compound and not an element.
- Discovery of tungsten – José and Fausto Elhuyar find an acid in wolframite which they reduce with charcoal to isolate tungsten.

== Earth sciences ==
- February 5–March 28 – Calabrian earthquakes in Kingdom of Two Sicilies.
- June 8 – The volcano Laki in Iceland begins a major eruption with extensive climatic consequences on both sides of the Atlantic Ocean.
- August 4 (Edo period, Tenmei 3) – Mount Asama, the most active volcano in Japan, begins climactic eruption, exacerbating a famine, following a plinian eruption beginning on May 9 (Tenmei eruption).

== History of science and technology ==
- German physician Melchior Adam Weikard publishes a biography of microscopist Wilhelm Friedrich von Gleichen, Biographie des Herrn Wilhelm Friedrich v. Gleichen genannt Rußwurm.

== Physics ==
- Jean-Paul Marat publishes Mémoire sur l'électricité médicale ("Memorandum on Medical Electricity").

== Technology ==
- Henry Cort of Funtley, England, invents the grooved rolling mill for producing bar iron.
- Thomas Bell patents a method of printing on fabric from engraved cylinders.
- Horace-Bénédict de Saussure publishes Essai sur l'hygrométrie, recording his experiments with the hair hygrometer.

== Awards ==
- Copley Medal: John Goodricke; Thomas Hutchins

== Births ==
- May 22 – William Sturgeon, English inventor (died 1850)
- June 9 – Benjamin Collins Brodie, English physiologist (died 1862)
- October 6 – François Magendie, French physiologist (died 1855)
- October 22 – Constantine Samuel Rafinesque, Ottoman-born French American polymath (died 1840)
- October 31 – Karl Wilhelm Gottlob Kastner, German chemist (died 1857)
- December 18 – Mary Anne Whitby, English scientist (died 1850)

== Deaths ==
- March 30 – William Hunter, Scottish anatomist (born 1718)
- April 16 – Christian Mayer, Moravian astronomer (born 1719)
- September 18 – Leonhard Euler, Swiss mathematician and physicist (born 1707)
- October 29 – Jean le Rond d'Alembert, French mathematician and physicist (born 1717)
- November – Carl Linnaeus the Younger, Swedish naturalist (born 1741 )
- December 13 – Pehr Wilhelm Wargentin, Swedish astronomer (born 1717)
- December 16 – Arima Yoriyuki, Japanese mathematician (born 1714)
- Wilhelm Friedrich von Gleichen, German microscopist (born 1717)
