= 1920 in science =

The year 1920 in science and technology involved some significant events, listed below.

== Astronomy and space science ==
- January 13 – The New York Times ridicules rocket scientist Robert H. Goddard, stating that spaceflight is impossible. In 1969, with Apollo 11 on its way to the Moon, the newspaper will publicly retract this position.
- December 13 – The red giant star Betelgeuse is the first to have its diameter determined by an optical astronomical interferometer, the Michelson stellar interferometer on Mount Wilson Observatory's reflector telescope.

== Biology ==
- Andrew Douglass proposes dendrochronology dating.
- Approximate date – The HIV pandemic almost certainly originates in Léopoldville, modern-day Kinshasa, the capital of the Belgian Congo.

== Chemistry ==
- July 15 – F. W. Aston shows that the molar mass of chlorine (35.45) is a weighted average of the almost integral masses for the two isotopes ^{35}Cl and ^{37}Cl.

== History of science and technology ==
- September 10 – Newcomen Society founded in the United Kingdom for the study of the history of engineering and technology.

== Medicine ==
- October 31 – Dr. Frederick Banting of Ontario first records his insight on how to isolate insulin for the treatment of diabetes; working with Charles Best, the first successful human trial of insulin will occur 15 months later.
- Hans Gerhard Creutzfeldt first describes some of the symptoms of what will become known as Creutzfeldt–Jakob disease.
- Hydrocodone, a narcotic analgesic closely related to codeine, is first synthesized in Germany by Carl Mannich and Helene Löwenheim.
- Black Cross Nurses founded in the United States.

== Meteorology ==
- Milutin Milanković proposes that long term climatic cycles may be due to changes in the eccentricity of the Earth's orbit and changes in the Earth's obliquity ("Milankovitch cycles").

== Physics ==
- Megh Nad Saha states his ionization equation.
- Albert Einstein delivers his Leiden Lecture.
- Ernest Rutherford predicts the existence of the neutron.
- James Jeans discovers that the dynamical constants of motion determine the distribution function for a system of particles.
- Publication of Alan A. Griffith's analysis of the process of brittle fracture.

== Psychology ==
- American psychologist Edward Thorndike names the halo effect and first provides empirical evidence that it is a specific cognitive bias.
- American psychologist John B. Watson conducts the Little Albert experiment in classical conditioning.

== Technology ==
- July 25 – The first transatlantic two-way radio broadcast is made.
- September 29 – First domestic radio sets come to stores in the United States – a Westinghouse radio costs $10.
- October – Young Russian physicist Lev Sergeyevich Termen first develops the electronic musical instrument which will become the Theremin.

== Events ==
- April 26 – Emil Racoviță establishes the world's first institute for the academic study of speleology at the Upper Dacia University in Cluj (Romania).
- Publication in Prague of Karel Čapek's drama R.U.R: Rossum's Universal Robots, introducing the word Robot to the world.

== Births ==
- January 20 – John Maynard Smith, British theoretical evolutionary biologist and geneticist (died 2004).
- February 7 – An Wang, Chinese-born computer engineer (died 1990).
- February 3 – Henry Heimlich, American thoracic surgeon (died 2016).
- March 11 – Nicolaas Bloembergen, Dutch physicist, Nobel Prize laureate (died 2017).
- March 15 – E. Donnall Thomas, American physician, Nobel Prize laureate.
- March 22 – Katsuko Saruhashi Japanese geochemist (died 2007).
- March 23 – Barbara Low, English-born biochemist (died 2019).
- April 6 – Edmond H. Fischer, Swiss American biochemist, Nobel Prize laureate (died 2012)
- April 9 – Alex Moulton, English mechanical engineer and inventor (died 2012).
- May 12 – Tang Dingyuan, Chinese physicist (died 2019).
- June 17 – François Jacob, French biologist, Nobel Prize laureate (died 2013).
- July 10 – Owen Chamberlain, American physicist, Nobel Prize laureate (died 2006).
- July 11 – David Challinor, American biologist, naturalist and scientific administrator at the Smithsonian Institution (died 2008).
- July 25 – Rosalind Franklin, English crystallographer (died 1958).
- July 30 – Marie Tharp, American geologist (died 2006).
- August 15 – Eleonore Trefftz, German molecular and nuclear physicist (died 2017).
- August 22 – Denton Cooley, American cardiac surgeon (died 2016).
- September 29 – Peter D. Mitchell, English chemist, Nobel Prize laureate (died 1992).
- October 29 – Baruj Benacerraf, Venezuelan immunologist, Nobel Prize laureate (died 2011).
- November 13 – Abraham Lilienfeld, American epidemiologist (died 1984).
- December 6 – George Porter, English chemist, Nobel Prize laureate (died 2002).

== Deaths ==
- January 3 – Zygmunt Janiszewski, Polish mathematician (born 1888).
- January 6 – Hieronymus Georg Zeuthen, Danish mathematician (born 1839).
- March 13 – Charles Lapworth, English geologist (born 1842).
- March 26 – William Chester Minor, American surgeon (born 1834).
- March 31 – Paul Bachmann, German mathematician (born 1837).
- April 3 – Mary Katharine Brandegee, American botanist (born 1844).
- April 8 – John Brashear, American astronomer (born 1840).
- April 9 – Moritz Cantor, German historian of mathematics (born 1829).
- April 26 – Srinivasa Ramanujan, Indian mathematician (born 1887).
- June 20
  - Marie Adolphe Carnot, French chemist and mining engineer (born 1839).
  - John Grigg, New Zealand astronomer (born 1838).
- August 10 – Ádám Politzer, Hungarian otologist (born 1835).
- August 12 – Hermann Struve, Russian-born astronomer (born 1854).
- August 16 – Norman Lockyer, English astronomer (born 1836).
- August 31 – Wilhelm Wundt, German physiologist and psychologist (born 1832).
- October 17 – Reginald Farrer, English botanist (born 1880).
- November 4 – Ludwig Struve, Russian astronomer (born 1858).
- December 3 – William de Wiveleslie Abney, English astronomer and photographer (born 1843).
