= Louise Hammarström =

Swedish chemist

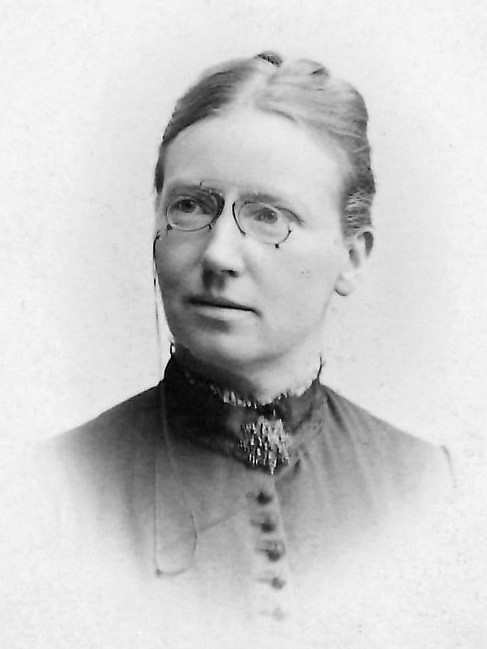
Louise Hammarström

Louise (Lovisa) Katarina Hammarström (25 May 1849 – 5 November 1917), was a Swedish chemist. She was the first formally educated female Swedish chemist.

Louise Hammarström was the daughter of a vicar. Orphaned at an early age, she grew up at an ironworks in Dalarna, in central Sweden, where she became interested in chemical substances.

She was a student at Konstfack, studied chemistry by private lessons, and was in 1875 employed at the laboratory of engineer Werner Cronquist in Stockholm, where she was active as an assistant in 1876-1881. She was then active as mineral chemist at the ironworks of Bångbro (1881–87), Fagersta (1887–91) and Schisshyttan (1891–93). In 1893, she opened her own laboratory in Kopparberg, in which she was primarily focused on minerals and geological studies.

== Sources ==
- Louise Hammarström Idun (Magazine), Nr. 47, 1885 (Swedish language)
