= 1938 in science =

The year 1938 in science and technology involved some significant events, listed below.

== Astronomy ==
- June 28 – A 450-ton meteorite strikes the Earth in an empty field near Chicora, Pennsylvania, United States.

== Biology ==
- December 22 – Marjorie Courtenay-Latimer discovers a Coelacanth, formerly seen only in fossils millions of years old, in a fisherman's catch in South Africa.
- Last known (captive) specimen of Schomburgk's deer is killed.
- Bawden and Pirie publish the first crystal of a spherical virus, Tomato bushy stunt virus.

== Chemistry ==
- April 6 – Roy J. Plunkett of DuPont accidentally discovers polytetrafluoroethylene (Teflon).
- September 20 – The first patents for nylon (first synthesized in 1935) are granted in the name of Wallace Carothers to DuPont. The first items produced in the new material are toothbrush bristles.
- November 16 – Lysergic acid diethylamide is first synthesized by Albert Hofmann from ergotamine at the Sandoz Laboratories in Basel.
- Melamine thermosetting resin is developed by American Cyanamid.

== Computer science ==
- Konrad Zuse in Berlin completes his Z1 computer, a floating point binary mechanical calculator with limited programmability, using Boolean logic and reading instructions from perforated 35 mm film.

== History of science ==
- Albert Einstein and Leopold Infeld publish The Evolution of Physics.

== Mathematics ==
- Frank Benford restates the law of distribution of first digits.
- Alan Turing completes his Ph.D. thesis, Systems of Logic Based on Ordinals, at Princeton University; it is presented to the London Mathematical Society on June 16.

== Medicine ==
- June 4–6 – Sigmund Freud and his immediate family leave Vienna for exile in London.
- March 4 – American biogerontologist Raymond Pearl demonstrates the negative health effects of tobacco smoking.
- August – Dorothy Hansine Andersen describes the characteristic cystic fibrosis of the pancreas and correlates it with the celiac, respiratory and intestinal diseases prominent in the condition, also first hypothesizing that cystic fibrosis is a recessive disorder.
- October – Robert Edward Gross becomes the first surgeon successfully to ligate an uninfected patent ductus arteriosus, in Boston.
- Hans Asperger first adopts the term autism in its modern sense in referring to autistic psychopaths in a lecture (in German) on child psychology.
- Ugo Cerletti and Lucio Bini discover electroconvulsive therapy.
- Philip Wiles of Middlesex Hospital in London carries out a total hip replacement using a stainless-steel prosthesis.
- American endocrinologist Henry Turner describes Turner syndrome.

== Physics ==
- December 17 – Discovery of nuclear fission by Otto Hahn, Lise Meitner and Fritz Strassmann with Otto Robert Frisch.
- Herbert E. Ives and G. R. Stilwell execute the Ives–Stilwell experiment, showing that ions radiate at frequencies affected by their motion.
- Nuclear magnetic resonance is first described and measured in molecular beams by Isidor Rabi.
- The Vlasov equation is first proposed for description of plasma by Anatoly Vlasov.

== Technology ==
- László Bíró obtains his first patent for a ballpoint pen, in France.

== Publications ==
- Ștefan Odobleja begins publication of his Psychologie consonantiste in Paris, seen in Romania as originating the study of cybernetics.

== Awards ==
- Nobel Prizes
  - Physics – Enrico Fermi
  - Chemistry – Richard Kuhn
  - Medicine – Corneille Jean François Heymans
- Copley Medal: Niels Bohr
- Wollaston Medal for geology: Maurice Lugeon

== Births ==
- January 2
  - Lynn Conway, American computer engineer
  - Farouk El-Baz, Egyptian-American space scientist
  - Dana Ulery, American computer scientist
- January 10 – Donald Knuth, American computer scientist and mathematician
- January 28 – Tomas Lindahl, Swedish biochemist, recipient of the Nobel Prize in Chemistry
- March 5 – Lynn Margulis, American biologist (d. 2011)
- March 7 – David Baltimore, American biologist, university administrator and recipient of the Nobel Prize in Physiology or Medicine
- March 31 – Dennis H. Klatt, American pioneer of speech synthesis (d. 1988)
- April 3 – John Darley, American social psychologist
- April 25 – Roger Boisjoly, American rocket engineer (d. 2012)
- May 11 – Fritz-Albert Popp, German biophysicist
- May 16 – Ivan Sutherland, American computer scientist and Turing Award winner
- June 29 – David Barker, English epidemiologist (d. 2013)
- July 2 – C. Kumar N. Patel, Indian electrical engineer
- July 19 – Jayant Narlikar, Indian astrophysicist
- September 3 – Ryōji Noyori, Japanese chemist, Nobel laureate
- September 17 – Alec Broers, Baron Broers, British electrical engineer
- September 26 – Alan Andrew Watson, Scottish astrophysicist
- September 30 – Alfred Cuschieri, Malta-born laparoscopic surgeon
- October 4 – Kurt Wüthrich, Swiss chemist, Nobel Prize laureate
- October 22 – Michael Berridge, Rhodesian-born British physiologist and biochemist (d. 2020)
- November 7 – Edgardo Gomez, Filipino biologist (d. 2019)
- December 7 – George Hockham, English electrical engineer (d. 2013)
- December 23 – Bob Kahn, American Internet pioneer

== Deaths ==
- January 31 – Sir James Crichton-Browne, Scottish psychiatrist (b. 1840)
- May 3 – Percy Furnivall, English surgeon (b. 1868)
- May 16
  - Fred Baker, American physician and naturalist (b. 1854)
  - Joseph Strauss, American bridge engineer (b. 1870)
- June 13 – Beverly Thomas Galloway, American plant pathologist (b. 1863)
- November 20 – Edwin Hall, American physicist, discoverer of the "Hall effect" (b. 1855)
