= 1852 in science =

The year 1852 in science and technology involved some significant events, listed below.

== Aeronautics ==
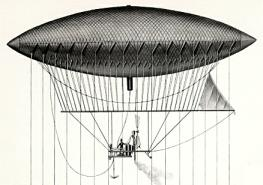
Giffard airship

- September 24 – French engineer Henri Giffard makes the first airship trip, from Paris to Trappes.

== Astronomy ==
- September 19 – Annibale de Gasparis discovers the asteroid 20 Massalia from the north dome of the Astronomical Observatory of Capodimonte in Naples.

== Biology ==
- October 5 – American apiarist L. L. Langstroth patents the Langstroth hive for the cultivation of honey bees.
- The parathyroid gland is first discovered by Richard Owen, in the Indian rhinoceros.
- Last recognised sighting of a great auk, on the Grand Banks of Newfoundland.

== Chemistry ==
- August Beer proposes Beer's law, which explains the relationship between the composition of a mixture and the amount of light it will absorb. Based partly on earlier work by Pierre Bouguer and Johann Heinrich Lambert, it establishes the analytical technique known as spectrophotometry.

== Mathematics ==
- October 23 – Francis Guthrie poses the four colour problem to Augustus De Morgan.

== Medicine ==
- January 15 – Nine representatives of Hebrew charitable organizations come together to form what will become the Mount Sinai Hospital, New York.
- February 15 – The Great Ormond Street Hospital for Sick Children, London, admits its first patient.

== Technology ==
- March 2 – The first American experimental steam fire engine, designed by Alexander Bonner Latta, is tested.
- August 23 – George Jennings receives a U.K. patent for improvements to the flush toilet.
- The mechanical semaphore line in France is superseded by the electric telegraph.
- Captain E. M. Boxer of the Royal Arsenal devises an improvement to the shrapnel shell by insertion of an iron diaphragm, preventing premature ignition.
- French physicist Léon Foucault (1819–1868) makes the first gyroscope for scientific use

== Awards ==
- Copley Medal: Alexander von Humboldt
- Wollaston Medal for Geology: William Henry Fitton

== Births ==
- March 25 – Charles Loomis Dana (died 1935), American neurologist.
- April 10 – Arthur Vierendeel (died 1940), Belgian civil engineer.
- May 1 – Santiago Ramón y Cajal (died 1934), Spanish neuroscientist, winner of the Nobel Prize in Physiology or Medicine.
- August 4 – Catharine van Tussenbroek (died 1925), Dutch physician.
- August 30 – Jacobus van 't Hoff (died 1911), Dutch chemist.
- September 9 – John Henry Poynting (died 1914), English physicist, discoverer of the Poynting–Robertson effect and the Poynting vector.
- September 15 – Edward Bouchet (died 1918), African American physicist.
- September 23 – William Stewart Halsted (died 1922), American surgeon.
- September 28 – Isis Pogson (died 1945), English astronomer and meteorologist.
- October 2 – William Ramsay (died 1916), Scottish winner of the Nobel Prize in Chemistry.
- October 6 – Bruno Abakanowicz (died 1900), Polish mathematician, inventor and electrical engineer.
- October 9 – Hermann Emil Fischer (died 1919), German winner of the Nobel Prize in Chemistry.
- November 12 - Xavier Arnozan (died 1928), French physician.
- December 13 – Charles E. de M. Sajous (died 1929), American endocrinologist.
- December 15 – Henri Becquerel (died 1908), French physicist.

== Deaths ==
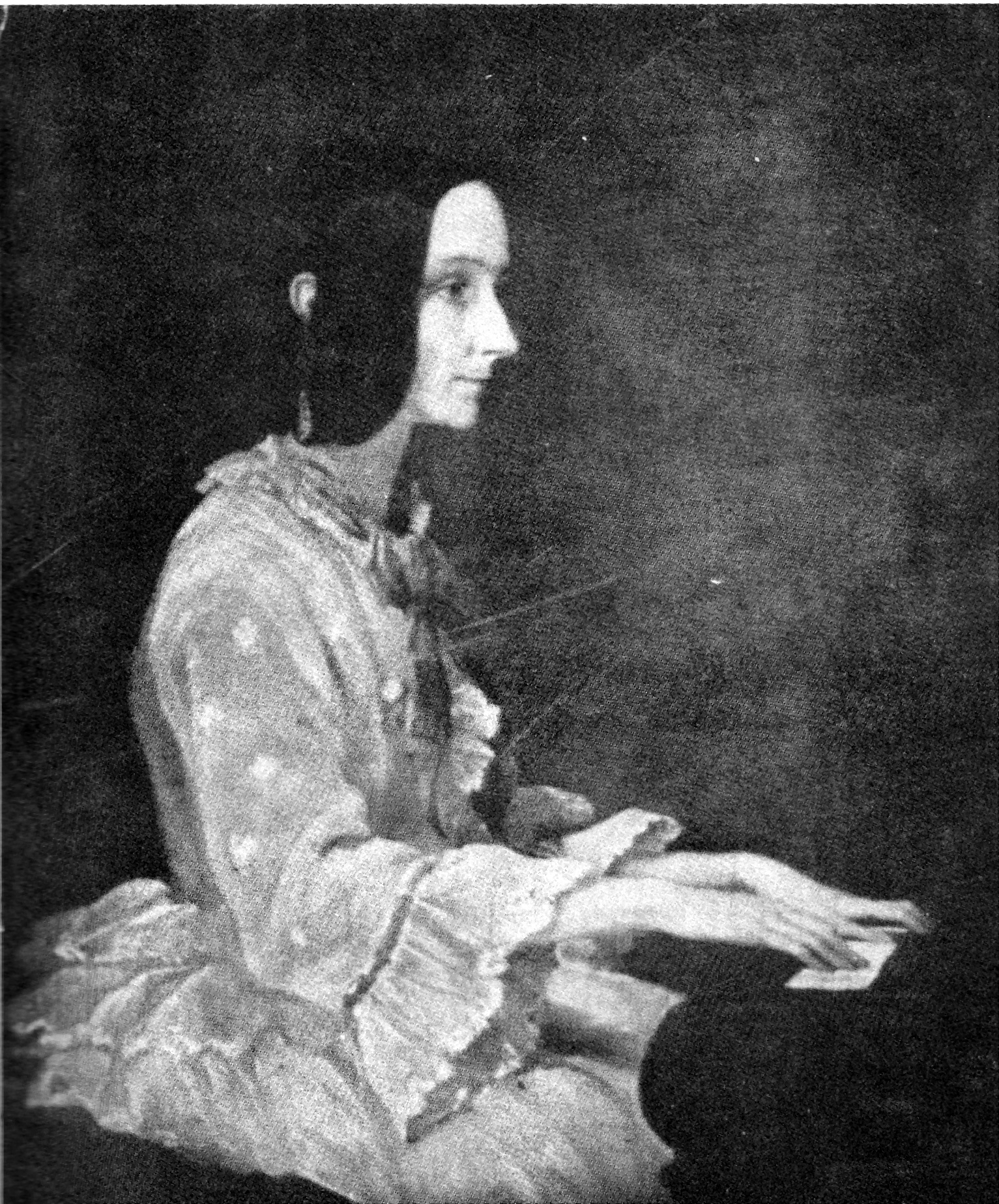
Ada Lovelace shortly before her death in 1852

- January 1 – John George Children (born 1777), English chemist, mineralogist and entomologist.
- January 6 – Louis Braille (born 1809), French inventor.
- January 13 - Jean-Nicolas Gannal (born 1791), French pharmacist, chemist, and inventor.
- August 15 – Johan Gadolin (born 1760), Finnish chemist.
- August 24 – Sarah Guppy (born 1770), English inventor.
- September 4 – William MacGillivray (born 1796), Scottish naturalist and ornithologist.
- September 8 – Anna Maria Walker (born 1778), Scottish botanist.
- October 9 – Thomas Frederick Colby (born 1784), English cartographer.
- November 10 – Gideon Mantell (born 1790), English paleontologist.
- November 27 – Augusta Ada King (née Byron), Countess of Lovelace (born 1815), English computing pioneer.
