= 1776 in science =

The year 1776 in science and technology involved some significant events.

== Astronomy ==
- Lagrange publishes a paper on the stability of planetary orbits.

== Botany ==
- William Withering publishes The Botanical Arrangement of all the Vegetables Naturally Growing in Great Britain, the first flora in English based on Linnaean taxonomy.

== Chemistry ==
- James Keir begins publication of A Dictionary of Chemistry in London, a translation into English of Pierre Macquer's Dictionnaire de chymie (1766).

== Exploration ==
- July 12 – Captain James Cook sets off from Plymouth, England, in HMS Resolution on his third voyage, to the Pacific Ocean and the Arctic.
- July 29 – Domínguez–Escalante expedition: Francisco Silvestre Vélez de Escalante, Francisco Atanasio Domínguez and eight other Spaniards set out from Santa Fe on a 2900 km (1800-mile) trek through the American Southwest. They are the first Europeans to explore the vast region between the Rockies and the Sierras.

== Geology ==
- James Keir suggests that some rocks, such as those at the Giant's Causeway, might have been formed by the crystallisation of molten lava.

== Mathematics ==
- Jean Baptiste Meusnier discovers the helicoid and announces Meusnier's theorem.

== Medicine ==
- November 30 – Sir John Pringle presents "A discourse upon some late improvements of the means for preserving the health of mariners" to the Royal Society of London, commending and publicising Captain Cook's methods for prevention of scurvy at sea.
- Publication of observations of epidemic diseases in Normandy, based on Hippocrates' table of epidemics by Louis Lépecq de La Clôture.

== Technology ==
- June–July – Claude-François-Dorothée, marquis de Jouffroy d'Abbans, demonstrates his steamboat Palmipède on the Doubs (river) in France.
- September 7 – American Revolutionary War: World's first submarine attack – The American submersible craft Turtle attempts to attach a time bomb to the hull of British flagship HMS Eagle in New York Harbor.
- John Wilkinson installs a steam blowing engine at his ironmaking furnace in Willey, Shropshire, England.

== Awards ==
- Copley Medal: James Cook

== Births ==
- February 4 – Gottfried Reinhold Treviranus, German naturalist (died 1837)
- February 14 – Christian Gottfried Daniel Nees von Esenbeck, German botanist (died 1858)
- March 27 – Charles-François Brisseau de Mirbel, French botanist and politician (died 1854)
- April 1 – Sophie Germain, French mathematician (died 1831)
- May 17 – Amos Eaton, American naturalist and pioneer of science education (died 1842)
- June 1 – Giuseppe Zamboni, Italian Catholic priest and physicist (died 1846)
- June 12 – Karl Friedrich Burdach, German physiologist (died 1847)
- July 16
  - Ludwig Heinrich Bojanus, German physician and naturalist (died 1827)
  - Johann Georg von Soldner, German physicist (died 1833)
- July 22 – Etheldred Benett, English geologist (died 1845)
- July 26 – Pierre Fouquier, French physician (died 1850)
- August 2 – Friedrich Stromeyer, German chemist, discoverer of cadmium (died 1835)
- August 6 – Amedeo Avogadro, Piedmontese chemist (died 1856)
- October 4 – Mariano Lagasca, Spanish botanist (died 1839)
- October 13 – Peter Barlow, English mathematician (died 1862)
- November 14 – Henri Dutrochet, French physician (died 1847)
- November 18 - Mauro Ruscóni, Italian physician and zoologist (died 1849)
- December 3 – Nicolas Charles Seringe, French physician and botanist (died 1858)
- December 31 – Johann Spurzheim, German physician (died 1832)

== Deaths ==
- February 18 – Lady Anne Monson, English-born botanist (born 1726)
- June 13 – William Battie, English psychiatrist (born 1703 or 1704)
- June 20 – Benjamin Huntsman, English inventor and manufacturer (born 1704)
- November 17 – James Ferguson, Scottish astronomer (born 1710)
