= 1849 in science =

The year 1849 in science and technology involved some significant events, listed below.

== Biology ==
- Arnold Adolph Berthold pioneers endocrinology with his observations on the operation of the testicles in roosters.
- Nikolai Annenkov begins publication of Flora Mosquensis Exsiccata, the first Russian Flora.
- Ephraim Wales Bull cultivates the Concord grape in Massachusetts.
- Richard Owen publishes On the Nature of Limbs and begins publication of A History of British Fossil Reptiles.
- William Thompson begins publication (in London) of The Natural History of Ireland with the first volume on birds.

== Chemistry ==
- Charles-Adolphe Wurtz obtains methylamine.
- Louis Pasteur discovers that the racemic form of tartaric acid is a mixture of the levorotatory and dextrotatory forms, thus clarifying the nature of optical rotation and advancing the field of stereochemistry.

== Mathematics ==
- George Gabriel Stokes shows that solitary waves can arise from a combination of periodic waves.

== Medicine ==
- January 23 – English-born Elizabeth Blackwell is awarded her M.D. by the Medical Institute of Geneva, New York, becoming the first woman to qualify as a doctor in the United States.
- London physician Dr. John Snow first publishes his theory that cholera is a contagious disease of the human gastrointestinal tract in his pamphlet On the Mode of Communication of Cholera.

== Physics ==
- Hippolyte Fizeau measures the speed of light in air

== Technology ==
- March 10 – George Henry Corliss is granted a United States patent for the rotary valve Corliss steam engine.
- April 10 – Walter Hunt is granted a United States patent for the modern safety pin. In October he patents the first repeating rifle to use metallic cartridges (of his own design) and a spring-fed magazine.
- May 22 – Abraham Lincoln's patent: Abraham Lincoln is granted a United States patent for a buoyancy mechanism to lift boats over river shoals, the only patent ever granted to a President of the United States.
- June 12 – Lewis Haslett is granted the first United States patent for a form of gas mask.
- June 20 – First tube of Robert Stephenson's Britannia Bridge is floated into position on the Menai Strait for the Chester and Holyhead Railway's North Wales Coast Line with many leading British railway civil engineers present.
- Completion of Wheeling Suspension Bridge over the Ohio River at Wheeling, West Virginia, designed by Charles Ellet, with a world record main span (at this date) of 1,010 ft (310 m) tower to tower.
- Completion of Roebling's Delaware Aqueduct, a wire suspension bridge carrying the Delaware and Hudson Canal over the Delaware River between Minisink Ford, New York, and Lackawaxen, Pennsylvania, designed by Russell F. Lord and John A. Roebling with a span of 535 ft (175 m).
- Eugene Bourdon patents the Bourdon gauge for pressure measurement in France.
- David Brewster perfects the stereoscope.
- Erastus Biglow first applies power to a carpet weaving loom, in the United States.
- James B. Francis develops the radial flow Francis turbine.

== Awards ==
- Copley Medal: Roderick Murchison
- Wollaston Medal for Geology: Joseph Prestwich

== Births ==
- March 7 – Luther Burbank (died 1926), American plant breeder.
- March 17 – Cornelia Clapp (died 1934), American marine biologist.
- April 19 – John Uri Lloyd (died 1936), American pharmacist and science fiction author.
- April 25 – Felix Klein (died 1925), German mathematician.
- May 25 – Louise Hammarström (died 1917), Swedish chemist.
- May 26 – Ernst Remak (died 1911), German neurologist.
- July 12 – William Osler (died 1919), Canadian physician.
- July 27 – John Hopkinson (died 1898), English electrical engineer.
- August 3 – Joseph Jules Dejerine (died 1917), French neurologist.
- September 14 – Ivan Pavlov (died 1936), Russian physiologist.
- October 26 – Ferdinand Georg Frobenius (died 1917), German mathematician.

== Deaths ==
- February 28 – Regina von Siebold (born 1771), German obstetrician.
- March 23 – Andrés Manuel del Río (born 1764), Spanish-born chemist.
- March 24 – Johann Wolfgang Döbereiner (born 1780), German chemist.
- March 27 - Mauro Ruscóni (born 1776), Italian physician and zoologist
- December 12 – Marc Isambard Brunel (born 1769), French-born engineer.
