= 1855 in science =

The year 1855 in science and technology involved some significant events, listed below.

== Biology ==
- September – Alfred Russel Wallace publishes "On the Law which has Regulated the Introduction of New Species", which he has written while working in Sarawak on the island of Borneo in February; in December, Edward Blyth brings it to the attention of Charles Darwin.
- Robert Remak publishes Untersuchungen über die Entwickelung der Wirbelthiere in Berlin, providing evidence for cell division, which is supported (but not acknowledged) by Rudolf Virchow.

== Cartography ==
- September – Rev. James Patterson presents the Gall orthographic projection for celestial and terrestrial equal-area cartography.

== Chemistry ==
- May 10 – The Bunsen burner is invented by Robert Wilhelm Bunsen.
- Friedrich Gaedcke first isolates the cocaine alkaloid, which he names "erythroxyline".
- William Odling proposes a methane type (tetravalent) for carbon.
- Charles-Adolphe Wurtz publishes the Wurtz reaction.
- Benjamin Silliman, Jr. pioneers methods of petroleum cracking, which makes the entire modern petrochemical industry possible.

== Earth sciences ==
- Famennian stage proposed by Belgian geologist André Dumont.

== Exploration ==
- November 17 – Dr David Livingstone becomes the first European to see the Victoria Falls.

== Medicine ==
- March – Mary Seacole opens the British Hotel at Balaklava, a nursing and convalescent establishment for Crimean War officers.
- October – The Renkioi temporary hospital, prefabricated in wood to a design by I. K. Brunel, is erected in Turkey to serve Crimean War invalids.
- Thomas Addison describes Addison's disease in On the Constitutional and Local Effects of Disease of the Suprarenal Capsules.
- The third plague pandemic breaks out in Yunnan, China. This bubonic plague pandemic eventually spreads to all inhabited continents, and ultimately leads to more than 12 million deaths in India and China (estimated 15 million worldwide) making it one of the deadliest pandemics in history. The pandemic is considered active until 1960.

== Paleontology ==
- The first archaeopteryx fossil is found in Bavaria, but will not be identified until 1970.

== Physics ==
- James Clerk Maxwell unifies electricity and magnetism into a single theory, classical electromagnetism, thereby showing that light is an electromagnetic wave.
- Heinrich Geißler designs a mercury pump capable of producing a significant vacuum.

== Technology ==
- August 27 – Alphonse Louis Poitevin patents the collotype photographic printing process in France.
- October 17 – Henry Bessemer files his patent for the Bessemer process of steelmaking.
- William Armstrong produces the rifled breech-loading Armstrong Gun.

== Institutions ==
- c. February – Establishment of the Industrial Museum of Scotland in Edinburgh, a predecessor of the National Museum of Scotland, with chemist George Wilson as its director. In August he is also appointed Regius Professor of Technology in the University of Edinburgh, the first such post in Britain. This year also he publishes Researches on Colour-Blindness.
- Opening of Eidgenössische Polytechnische Schule in Zürich, Switzerland.

== Publications ==
- Matthew Fontaine Maury publishes The Physical Geography of the Sea.

== Awards ==
- Copley Medal: Léon Foucault
- Wollaston Medal for Geology: Henry De la Beche

== Births ==
- January 5 – King Camp Gillette (died 1932), American inventor.
- January 21 – John Browning (died 1926), American inventor.
- January 28 – William Seward Burroughs (died 1898), American inventor of the adding machine.
- March 4 – Luther Emmett Holt (died 1924), American pediatrician.
- March 13 – Percival Lowell (died 1916), American astronomer.
- May 12 – Oskar von Miller (died 1934), German electrical engineer and founder of the Deutsches Museum.
- May 29 – David Bruce (died 1931), Australian-born British microbiologist.
- July 17 – Stephen Paget (died 1926), English surgeon.
- November 5 – Léon Teisserenc de Bort (died 1913), French meteorologist.
- November 7 – Edwin Hall (died 1938), American physicist, discoverer of the "Hall effect".

== Deaths ==
- February 23 – Carl Friedrich Gauss (born 1777), German mathematician.
- February 27 – Bryan Donkin (born 1768), English engineer and inventor.
- March 20 – Joseph Aspdin (born 1778), English inventor.
- April 13 – Henry De la Beche (born 1796), English geologist.
- June 7 – Friederike Lienig (born 1790), Latvian entomologist.
- June 29 – John Gorrie (born 1803), Scottish American physician and inventor.
- July 6 – Andrew Crosse (born 1784), English 'gentleman scientist', pioneer experimenter in electricity.
- July 8 – William Parry (born 1790), English Arctic explorer.
- October 7 – François Magendie (born 1783), French physiologist.
- December 6 – William Swainson (born 1789), English naturalist.
