= 1916 in science =

The year 1916 involved a number of significant events in science and technology, some of which are listed below.

== Astronomy ==
- Barnard's Star is discovered by Edward Emerson Barnard.
- Harlow Shapley finds that the spectrum of S Sagittae and other Cepheid variables varies with brightness, recording it as spectral type F0 leading to maximum, F4 at maximum, and G3 just before minimum brightness.

== Chemistry ==
- Gilbert N. Lewis and Irving Langmuir formulate an electron shell model of chemical bonding.
- The Born–Haber cycle, an approach to analyze reaction energies, is developed by German scientists Max Born and Fritz Haber.
- Sydney Chapman and David Enskog systematically develop a kinetic theory of gases.
- Jan Czochralski invents a method for growing single crystals of metals.

== Mathematics ==
- Ludwig Bieberbach presents the Bieberbach conjecture.
- Wacław Sierpiński gives the first example of an absolutely normal number and describes the Sierpinski carpet.

== Medicine ==
- 1 January – The British Royal Army Medical Corps carries out the first successful blood transfusion using blood that had been stored and cooled.
- 16 October – Margaret Sanger opens a family planning and birth control clinic in Brownsville, Brooklyn, the first of its kind in the United States. Nine days later, she is arrested for breaking a New York state law prohibiting distribution of contraceptives. This same year, she publishes What Every Girl Should Know, providing information about such topics as menstruation and sexuality in adolescents.
- Georges Guillain, Jean Alexandre Barré and André Strohl diagnose two soldiers with Guillain–Barré syndrome of the peripheral nervous system and describe the key diagnostic abnormality of increased spinal fluid protein production, but normal cell count.
- Eugen Bleuler publishes his Lehrbuch der Psychiatrie, including a definition of complexes arising from diffuse brain damage, known as "Bleuler's psycho syndrome".
- Medication Suramin against African sleeping sickness and river blindness is first made by German company Bayer AG.

== Physics ==
- Albert Einstein publishes "Die Grundlage der allgemeinen Relativitätstheorie" on general relativity in Annalen der Physik 49 and shows that the field equations of general relativity admit wavelike solutions. This will be demonstrated in 2016.
- Karl Schwarzschild solves the Einstein vacuum field equations for uncharged spherically symmetric non-rotating systems and calculates Schwarzschild radius.

== Psychology ==
- Lewis M. Terman of Stanford University develops the first of the Stanford–Binet Intelligence Scales for intelligence testing.

== Technology ==
- February – Stahlhelm steel helmet first issued to German soldiers.
- 18 April – Capt. Peter Nissen completes the prototype Nissen hut.
- 11 September – The almost-completed Quebec Bridge collapses for the second time.

== Events ==
- Chemist Chika Kuroda becomes the first woman in Japan to receive a Bachelor of Science degree.

== Births ==
- 9 January – Peter Twinn, mathematician and World War II code-breaker (died 2004)
- 10 January – Sune K. Bergström (died 2004), Swedish biochemist, winner of the 1982 Nobel Prize in Physiology or Medicine.
- 25 January – John R. F. Jeffreys (died 1944), British mathematician and cryptanalyst.
- 4 March – Hans Eysenck (died 1997), German-born psychologist.
- 26 March – Christian B. Anfinsen (died 1995), American biochemist, winner of the 1972 Nobel Prize in Chemistry.
- 14 April – Lawrence Hogben (died 2015), New Zealand meteorologist.
- 22 April – Ruth A. M. Schmidt (died 2014), American geologist.
- 30 April – Claude Shannon (died 2001), American mathematician, "father of information theory".
- 6 May – Robert H. Dicke (died 1997), American physicist.
- 4 June – Robert F. Furchgott (died 2009), American biochemist, winner of the 1998 Nobel Prize in Physiology or Medicine.
- 8 June – Francis Crick (died 2004), English-born molecular biologist, co-discoverer of the nucleic acid double helix structure in 1953, winner of the 1962 Nobel Prize in Physiology or Medicine.
- 11 June – Alexander Prokhorov (died 2002), Australian-born Soviet Russian physicist.
- 15 June – Herbert A. Simon (died 2001), American polymath, winner of the 1978 Nobel Memorial Prize in Economic Sciences.
- 1 July – Iosif Shklovsky (died 1985), Ukrainian astrophysicist.
- 11 July – Kitty Joyner (died 1993), American electrical engineer.
- 25 August – Frederick Chapman Robbins (died 2003), American pediatrician and virologist, winner of the 1954 Nobel Prize in Physiology or Medicine.
- 30 September – Richard K. Guy (died 2020), English mathematician.
- 3 October – Frank Pantridge (died 2004), Northern Ireland cardiologist.
- 4 October – Vitaly Ginzburg (died 2009), Soviet Russian theoretical physicist, astrophysicist, one of the fathers of the Soviet hydrogen bomb, winner of the 2003 Nobel Prize in Physics, member of the Soviet and Russian Academies of Sciences.
- 19 October – Jean Dausset (died 2009), French immunologist, winner of the 1980 Nobel Prize in Physiology or Medicine.
- 16 November – Christopher Strachey (died 1975), English computer scientist.
- 9 December – Esther Wilkins (died 2016), pioneer of dental hygiene.
- 15 December – Maurice Wilkins (died 2004), New Zealand-born English molecular biologist, co-discoverer of the nucleic acid double helix structure in 1953 using X-ray diffraction, winner of the 1962 Nobel Prize in Physiology or Medicine.
- 27 December – John Duckworth (died 2015), British physicist.

== Deaths ==
- 12 February – Richard Dedekind (born 1831), German mathematician.
- 19 February – Ernst Mach (born 1838), Austrian-born physicist.
- 11 May
  - Karl Schwarzschild (born 1873), German astronomer and physicist.
  - Nadezhda Ziber-Shumova (born 1856), Russian biochemist.
- 15 July – Élie Metchnikoff (born 1845), Russian zoologist and immunologist, winner of the 1908 Nobel Prize in Physiology or Medicine.
- 23 July – Sir William Ramsay (born 1852), Scottish-born chemist, winner of the 1904 Nobel Prize in Chemistry.
- September – Anton Köllisch (born 1888), German chemist noted for synthesising MDMA
- 14 September – Pierre Duhem (born 1861), French philosopher of science.
- 29 September – Albert John Cook (born 1842), American entomologist and zoologist.
- 10 November – Walter Sutton (born 1877), American geneticist and surgeon.
- 12 November – Percival Lowell (born 1855), American astronomer.
- 24 November – Hiram Maxim (born 1840), American inventor of the machine gun.
- 31 December – Alice Ball (born 1892), African-American chemist.
