= Camille Polonceau =

French railway systems engineer

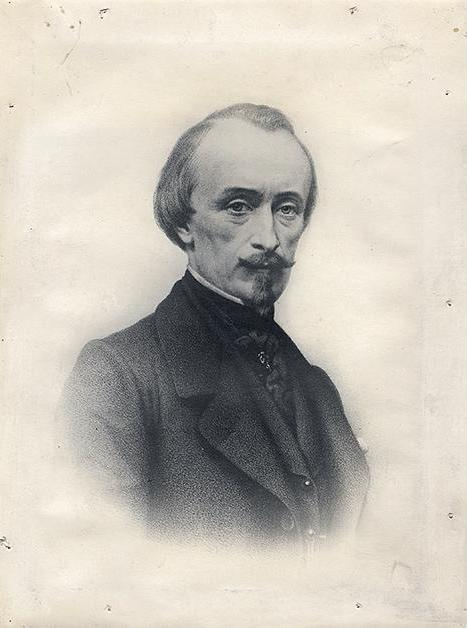
Camille Polonceau

Jean-Barthélémy Camille Polonceau (29 October 1813 – 21 September 1859) was a French railway systems engineer. He was born in Chambery, France, and died in the French commune Viry-Châtillon.

In 1839 he invented the Polonceau truss, a method of roof construction considered "one of the most successful roof designs of the nineteenth century".

Polonceau's name is one of the 72 names on the Eiffel Tower.
