= 1924 in science =

The year 1924 in science and technology involved some significant events, listed below.

== Astronomy and space exploration ==
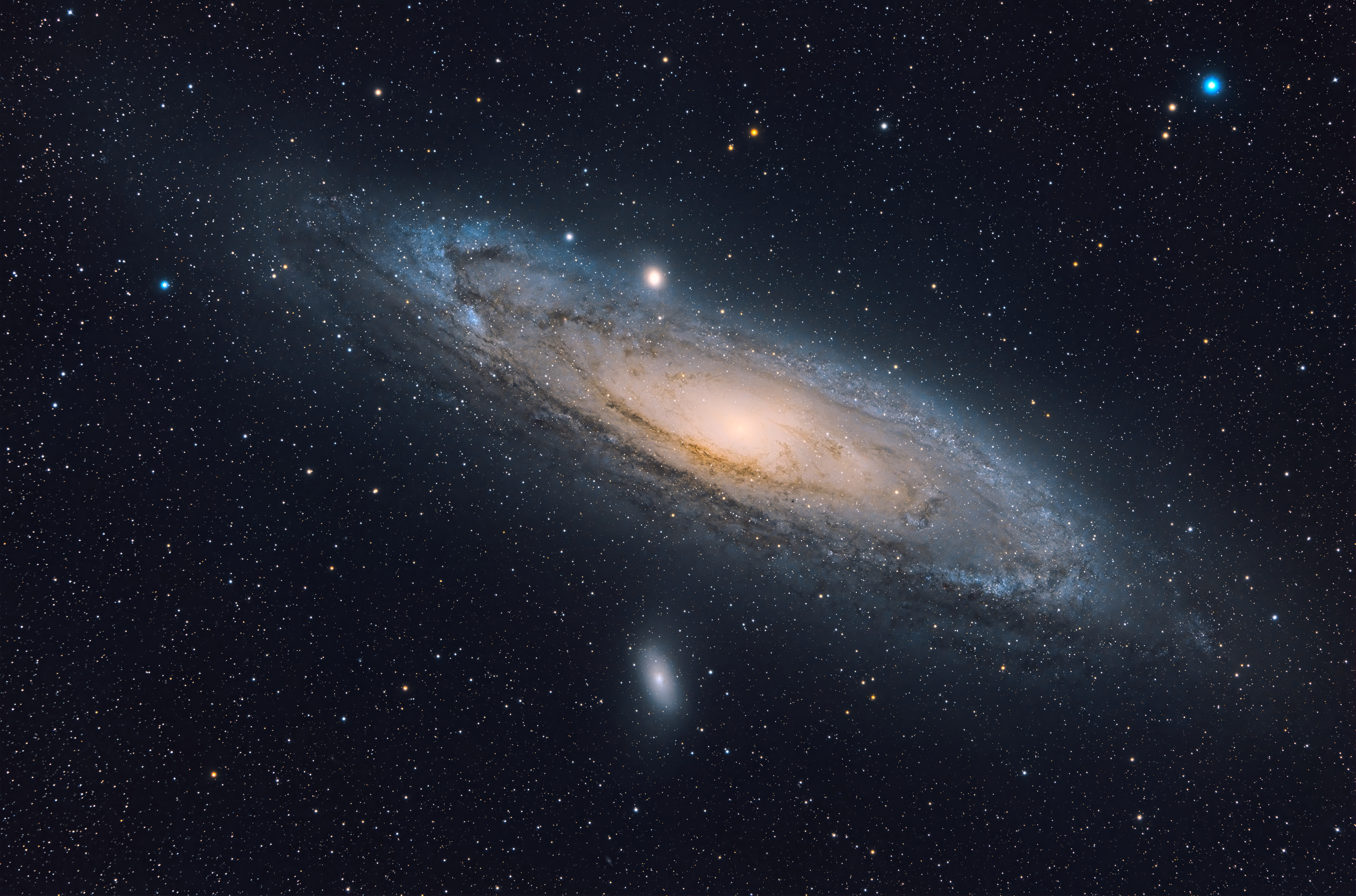
Andromeda Galaxy

- November 23 – Edwin Hubble announces his discovery that Andromeda, previously believed to be a nebula, is actually another galaxy, and that the Milky Way is only one of many such galaxies in the universe.
- The Einstein Tower near Potsdam, Germany, designed by Erich Mendelsohn, becomes operational as an astrophysical observatory.
- Mount Stromlo Observatory near Canberra, Australia, is established as the Commonwealth Solar Observatory.
- 1056 Azalea is discovered.

== Biology ==
- The term "ectogenesis" is coined by British scientist J. B. S. Haldane to describe the growth of mammalian embryos in artificial environments.
- California grizzly bear last sighted.

== Biochemistry ==
- The first inactive tetanus vaccine (tetanus toxoid, TT) is discovered by Gaston Ramon, C. Zoeller and P. Descombey and produced.
- The first scarlet fever vaccine is discovered by George F. Dick and Gladys Dick.

== History of science and technology ==
- December 17 – Dismantling of James Watt's workshop for display in the Science Museum, London, commences.

== Mathematics ==
- Polish mathematicians Stefan Banach and Alfred Tarski publish the Banach–Tarski paradox.
- German mathematician David Hilbert proposes Hilbert's paradox of the Grand Hotel.
- Polish logician Jan Łukasiewicz devises reverse Polish notation.

== Medicine ==
- German physiologist and psychiatrist Hans Berger records the first human electroencephalogram.
- Thrombotic thrombocytopenic purpura is first described by Hungarian-American pathologist and physician Eli Moschcowitz.
- Johnson & Johnson begin mass producing Band-Aid.

== Paleontology ==
- October – The first specimen of Australopithecus africanus, the fossil skull of the "Taung Child", is identified in South Africa.

== Physics ==
- S. N. Bose and Albert Einstein publish papers in Zeitschrift für Physik applying Bose–Einstein statistics to light quanta and to atomic models and predicting existence of the Bose–Einstein condensate.
- E. C. Stoner publishes a paper pointing out that for a given value of the principal quantum number (n), the number of energy levels of a single electron in the alkali metal spectra in an external magnetic field, where all degenerate energy levels are separated, is equal to the number of electrons in the closed shell of the rare gases for the same value of n. This leads to discovery of the Pauli exclusion principle which Wolfgang Pauli first proposes in a letter at the end of the year.
- Louis de Broglie introduces the wave-model of atomic structure, based on the ideas of wave–particle duality.

== Technology ==
- February 5 – Hourly time signals from Royal Greenwich Observatory are broadcast for the first time.
- February – John Logie Baird sends rudimentary television pictures over a short distance.
- Václav Holek designs the ZB vz. 26 light machine gun for Zbrojovka Brno.
- The earth inductor compass is developed by Morris Titterington at the Pioneer Instrument Company in Brooklyn, New York.
- Kleenex available to the general public.

== Awards ==
- Nobel Prizes
  - Physics: Karl Manne Georg Siegbahn
  - Medicine: Willem Einthoven

== Births ==
- February – Li Xintian (died 2019), Chinese neuropsychologist
- February 21 – Thelma Estrin (died 2014), American computer scientist and biomedical engineer
- March 2 – Michael Sela (died 2022), Polish-born Israeli immunologist
- March 11 – Franco Basaglia (died 1980), Italian psychiatrist
- March 12 – Mary Lee Woods (died 2017), English mathematician and computer programmer
- March 23
  - Bjørn G. Andersen (died 2012), Norwegian quaternary geologist and glaciologist (early environmental studies)
  - Olga Kennard (died 2023), English crystallographer
- May 3 – Isadore Singer (died 2021), American mathematician
- May 7 – James Learmonth Gowans (died 2020), British immunologist
- May 11 – Antony Hewish (died 2021), English radioastronomer (Nobel Prize in Physics 1974)
- June 11 – César Lattes (died 2005), Brazilian experimental physicist (Nobel Prize in Physic, 1950)
- June 24 – James W. Black (died 2010), Scottish pharmacologist (Nobel Prize in Physiology or Medicine, 1988)
- July 8 – Robert M. Chanock (died 2010), American pediatrician and virologist
- July 15 – David Cox (died 2022), English statistician
- August 1 – John Clive Ward (died 2000), English-born physicist working in quantum electrodynamics
- September 10 – Elizabeth Killick (died 2019), English naval electronics engineer
- September 22 – Laurel van der Wal (died 2009), American aeronautical engineer
- September 26 – Jean Hoerni (died 1997), Swiss-born microelectronics engineer
- November 9 – Don Beaven (died 2009), New Zealand medical researcher in the area of diabetes treatment and prevention
- November 20 – Benoît Mandelbrot (died 2010), Polish-born French American mathematician, originator of fractal geometry
- December 30 – Yvonne Brill (died 2013), Canadian scientist best known for her work developing rocket and jet propulsion technologies

== Deaths ==
- January 14 – Luther Emmett Holt (born 1855), American pediatrician
- February 11 – Jacques Loeb (born 1859), German-born physiologist
- February 27 – Émile Vallin (born 1833), French military physician.
- March 22 – Sir William Macewen (born 1848), Scottish surgeon
- April 4 – Arnold Pick (born 1851), Czech neurologist
- April 24 – G. Stanley Hall (born 1844), American psychologist
- September 24 – Alexandre Lacassagne (born 1843), French forensic scientist
- October 1 – John Edward Campbell (born 1862), British mathematician
- December 27 – Agda Meyerson (born 1866), Swedish nurse and healthcare profession activist
