= 1705 in science =

The year 1705 in science and technology involved some significant events.

== Astronomy ==
- Edmond Halley, in his Synopsis Astronomia Cometicae, states that comets seen in 1456, 1531, 1607, and 1682 were actually a single comet and correctly predicts that it will return in 1758.

== Life sciences ==
- Dutch lepidopterist Maria Merian publishes Metamorphosis insectorum Surinamensium.
- French anatomist Raymond Vieussens publishes Novum vasorum corporis humani systema, considered an early classic work on cardiology.
- French surgeon Jean Louis Petit publishes L'Art de guerir les maladies des os, the first significant work on bone disease.

== Other events ==
- April 16 – Isaac Newton is knighted by Anne, Queen of Great Britain, at Trinity College, Cambridge.

== Births ==
- February 22 – Peter Artedi, Swedish naturalist (died 1735)
- April 11 – William Cookworthy, English chemist (died 1780)
- June 21 – David Hartley, English physician and psychologist (died 1757)
- undated – Charles Labelye, Swiss engineer (died c. 1781)
- undated – Thomas Boulsover, English inventor (died 1788)
- undated – Faustina Pignatelli, Italian mathematician (died 1785)

== Deaths ==
- January 17 – John Ray, English naturalist (born 1627)
- August 16 – Jakob Bernoulli, Swiss mathematician (born 1654)
- October 11 – Guillaume Amontons, French scientific instrument inventor and physicist (born 1663)
- November 10 – Justine Siegemund, German midwife (born 1636)
