= 1833 in science =

The year 1833 in science and technology involved several significant events, discoveries, and situations, listed below.

== Astronomy ==
- November 12–13 – A spectacular occurrence of the Leonid meteor shower is observed over Alabama.

== Biology ==
- May 3 – The Entomological Society of London is inaugurated.
- Katherine Sophia Kane's The Irish Flora is published anonymously.

== Chemistry ==
- Thomas Graham proposes Graham's law.

== Computer science ==
- June 5 – Ada Lovelace is introduced to Charles Babbage by Mary Somerville.

== Geophysics ==
- November 25 – A major 8.7 earthquake strikes Sumatra.

== Mathematics ==
- probable date – Paul Gerwien proves the Bolyai–Gerwien theorem formulated by Farkas Bolyai: that any two simple polygons of equal area are equidecomposable.

== Paleontology ==
- Henry Witham publishes The Internal Structure of Fossil Vegetables found in the Carboniferous and Oolitic deposits of Great Britain in Edinburgh.

== Physics ==
- Carl Friedrich Gauss and Wilhelm Eduard Weber develop an electromagnetic telegraph at Göttingen.

== Physiology and medicine ==
- William Beaumont publishes Experiments and Observations on the Gastric Juice and the Physiology of Digestion.
- Charles Bell publishes The Hand: its Mechanism and Vital Endowments as Evincing Design, the fourth Bridgewater Treatise.
- Marshall Hall coins the term "reflex" for a muscular reaction.
- Jean Lobstein proposes use of the term arteriosclerosis.
- Johannes Peter Müller begins publication of his major physiology textbook Handbuch der Physiologie des Menschen.
- Anselme Payen discovers diastase (the first enzyme identified).

== Technology ==
- August 18 – The Canadian ship SS Royal William sets out from Pictou, Nova Scotia on a 25-day passage of the Atlantic Ocean largely under steam to Gravesend, Kent, England.
- Obed Hussey patents a reaper in the United States.
- Cornish engineer Adrian Stephens invents the steam whistle as a warning device at Dowlais Ironworks in Wales.
- Publication by Charles Knight of The Penny Cyclopædia of the Society for the Diffusion of Useful Knowledge begins in London.

== Awards ==
- Copley Medal: Not awarded

== Births ==
- January 19 – Alfred Clebsch (died 1872), German mathematician.
- February 26 – Georges Pouchet (died 1894), French comparative anatomist.
- March 14 – Lucy Hobbs Taylor (died 1910), American dentist.
- March 23 – Karl Friedrich Otto Westphal (died 1890), German psychiatrist.
- March 25 – Fleeming Jenkin (died 1885), English electrical engineer.
- May 5 – Ferdinand von Richthofen (died 1905), German geographer.
- June 29 – Peter Waage (died 1900), Norwegian chemist.
- October 9 – Eugen Langen (died 1895), German mechanical engineer.
- October 17 – Paul Bert (died 1886), French physiologist.
- October 21 – Alfred Nobel (died 1896), Swedish inventor.
- November 27 - Émile Vallin (died 1924), French military physician.
- December 2 – Friedrich Daniel von Recklinghausen (died 1910), German pathologist.

== Deaths ==
- January 10 – Adrien-Marie Legendre (born 1752), mathematician.
- February 6
  - Fausto Elhuyar (born 1755), chemist
  - Pierre André Latreille (born 1762), zoologist.
- February 14 – Gottlieb Kirchhoff (born 1764), chemist.
- April 22 – Richard Trevithick (born 1771), engineer and inventor.
- May 15 – Bewick Bridge (born 1767), mathematician.
- July 5 – Nicéphore Niépce (born 1765), inventor.
- October 31 – Johann Friedrich Meckel (born 1781), anatomist.
