= 1700 in science =

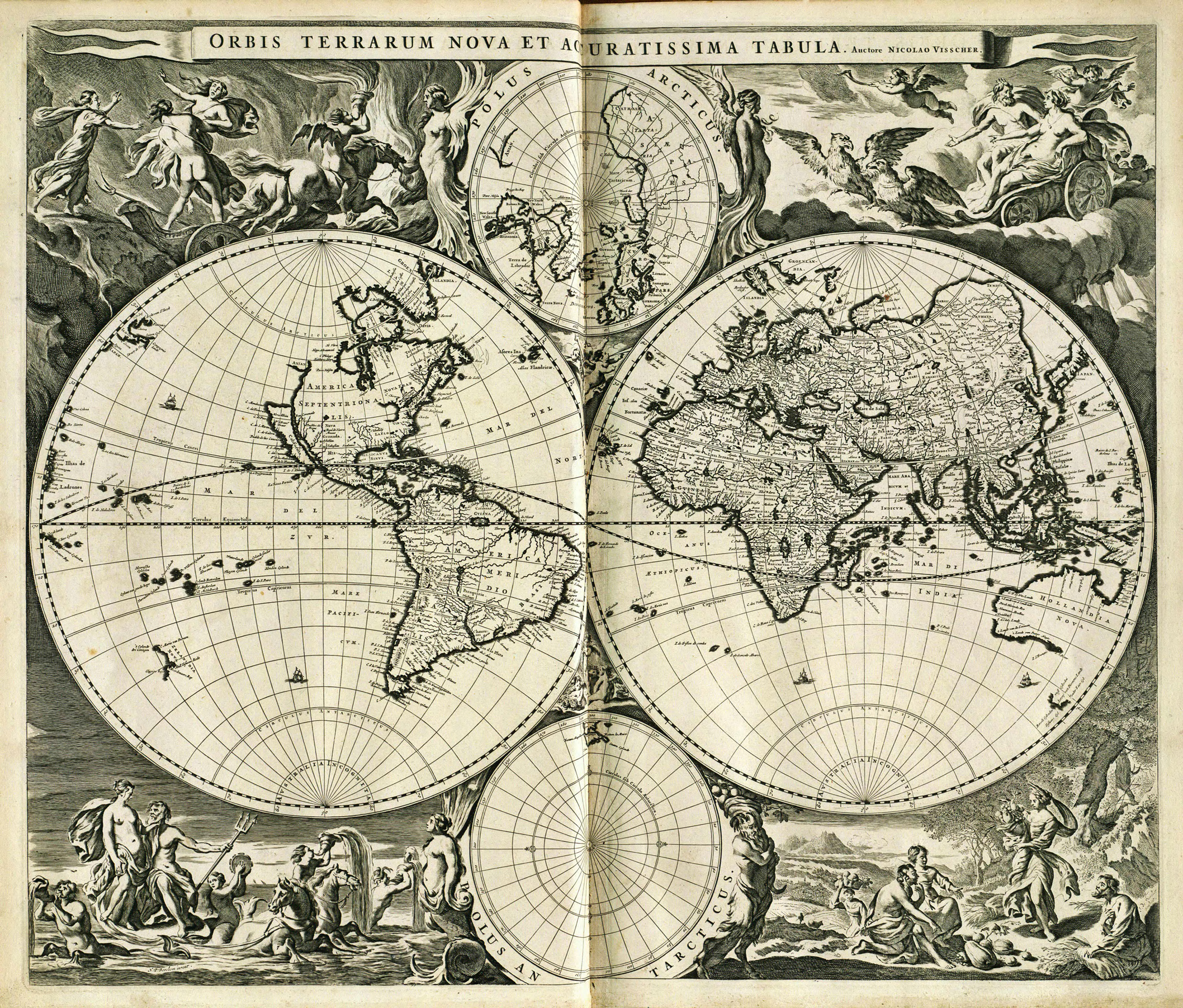

The year 1700 in science and technology involved some significant events.

== Exploration ==
- September 6 – Edmond Halley returns to England after a voyage of almost one year on HMS Paramour, from which he has observed the Antarctic Convergence, and publishes his findings on terrestrial magnetism in General Chart of the Variation of the Compass.

== Geology ==
- January 26 – At approximately 9 p.m., the Cascadia earthquake occurs in the Pacific Northwest with an estimated moment magnitude of 8.7–9.2. This megathrust earthquake ruptures about 1,000 kilometers (620 miles) of the Cascadia Subduction Zone and causes a tsunami that strikes the coast of Japan approximately 10 hours later.

== Medicine ==
- Nicolas Andry publishes De la génération des vers dans les corps de l'homme, a pioneering text in the germ theory of disease.
- Bernardino Ramazzini publishes De Morbis Artificum Diatriba in Modena, a pioneering text in occupational medicine.

== Technology ==
- approx. date – The clarinet might have been invented by the German flute maker Joseph Mamadski as a modification of the chalumeau, but it will not be until the late 18th century that composers include clarinets into their orchestrations.
- The piano, newly invented by Bartolomeo Cristofori, is listed in an inventory of musical instruments owned by the Medici.

== Institutions ==
- July 11 – The Prussian Academy of Sciences is founded with Leibniz as president.

== Births ==
- February 8 – Daniel Bernoulli, Swiss mathematician (died 1782)
- May 7 – Gerard van Swieten, Dutch-born physician (died 1772)
- November 19 – Jean-Antoine Nollet, French clergyman and physicist (died 1770)
- November 28 – Nathaniel Bliss, English astronomer (died 1764)
- Undated
  - William Braikenridge, Scottish clergyman and geometer (died 1762)
  - George Martine, Scottish physician and scientist (died 1741)

== Deaths ==
- May 22 – Louis Jolliet, Canadian explorer (born 1645)
- June 1 – Willem ten Rhijne, Dutch doctor and botanist (born 1647)
- August 8 – Joseph Moxon, English mathematician (born 1627)
- Undated – Kamalakara, Indian astronomer and mathematician (born 1616)
