= Henry Norris Russell Lectureship =

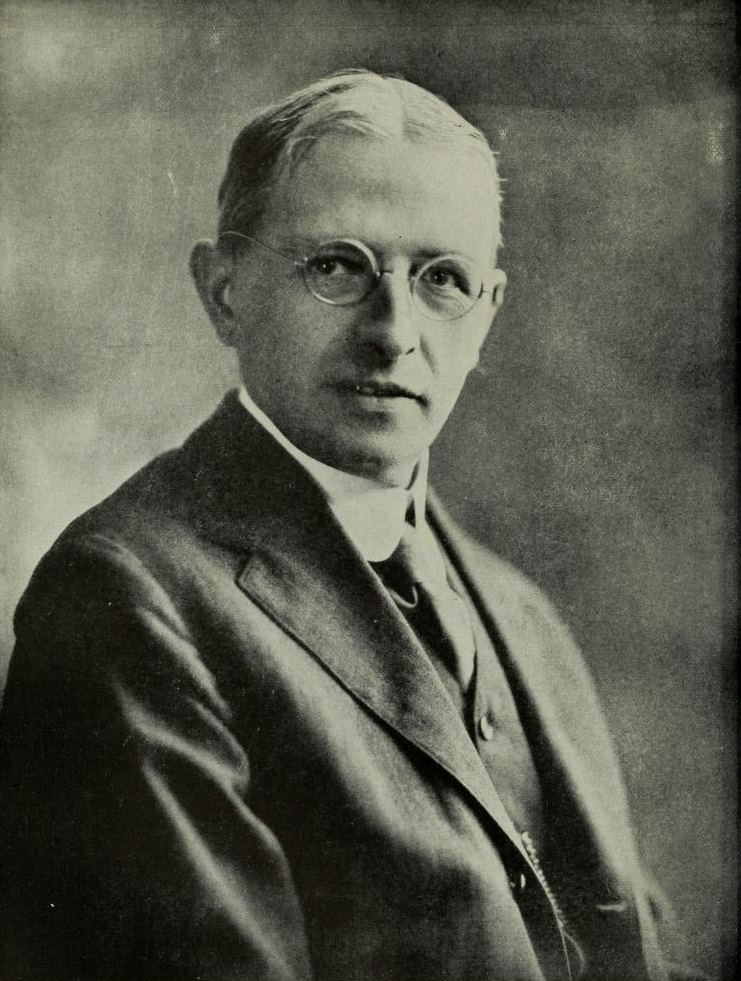
Portrait of Harry Norris Russell

The Henry Norris Russell Lectureship is awarded each year by the American Astronomical Society in recognition of a lifetime of excellence in astronomical research. The idea for the lectureship came from then society President Harlow Shapley in 1945, who led the fund raising drive to collect $10,000 from the membership. One of the major contributors was the Mexican Ambassador to the United States, as Russell had been an important representative at the dedication ceremony for the Mexican National Observatory. The goal was reached in December 1946, using not a little amount of coercive language by Shapley. The first Russell lecturer was, naturally, fellow American astronomer Henry Norris Russell, for whom the award is named. Russell gave a lecture titled "The Royal Road of Eclipses" concerning eclipsing binary stars.

== Previous lecturers ==
This list of lecturers is from the American Astronomical Society's website.

Year	Winner
1946	Henry Norris Russell
1947	Walter Sydney Adams
1948	No award
1949	Subrahmanyan Chandrasekhar
1950	Harlow Shapley
1951	Jan Oort
1952	No award
1953	Enrico Fermi, Lyman Spitzer
1954	No award
1955	Paul Merrill
1956	Joel Stebbins
1957	Otto Struve
1958	Walter Baade
1959	Gerard P. Kuiper
1960	Martin Schwarzschild
1961	William Wilson Morgan
1962	Grote Reber
1963	William Alfred Fowler
1964	Ira S. Bowen
1965	Bengt Strömgren
1966	Richard Tousey
1967	Otto Neugebauer
1968	John G. Bolton
1969	Eugene Parker
1970	Jesse L. Greenstein
1971	Fred Hoyle
1972	Allan Sandage
1973	Leo Goldberg
1974	Edwin Salpeter
1975	George Herbig
1976	Cecilia Payne-Gaposchkin
1977	Olin C. Wilson
1978	Maarten Schmidt
1979	Peter Goldreich
1980	Jeremiah P. Ostriker
1981	Riccardo Giacconi
1982	Bart Bok
1983	Herbert Friedman
1984	E. Margaret Burbidge
1985	Olin J. Eggen
1986	Albert Whitford
1987	Fred L. Whipple
1988	Gerard de Vaucouleurs
1989	Icko Iben, Jr.
1990	Sidney van den Bergh
1991	Donald Osterbrock
1992	Lawrence Aller
1993	James Peebles
1994	Vera Rubin
1995	Robert Kraft
1996	Gerry Neugebauer
1997	Alastair Cameron
1998	Charles Townes
1999	John Bahcall
2000	Donald Lynden-Bell
2001	Wallace Sargent
2002	George Wallerstein
2003	George Wetherill
2004	Martin Rees
2005	James E. Gunn
2006	Bohdan Paczyński
2007	David L. Lambert
2008	Rashid Sunyaev
2009	George W. Preston
2010	Margaret J. Geller
2011	Sandra M. Faber
2012	William David Arnett
2013	Ken Freeman (astronomer)
2014	George B. Field
2015	Giovanni G. Fazio
2016	Christopher F. McKee
2017	Eric Becklin
2018	Joseph Silk
2019	Ann Merchant Boesgaard
2020	Scott Tremaine
2021	Nick Scoville
2022	Richard Mushotzky
2023	Frank Shu
2024	Neta Bahcall
2025	Marcia J. Rieke

== See also ==
- List of astronomy awards
- Henry Norris Russell Lectureship
