= 1992 in science =

List of years in science	(table)
- … 1982; 1983; 1984; 1985; 1986; 1987; 1988; 1989; 1990; 1991; 1992; 1993; 1994; 1995; 1996; 1997; 1998; 1999; 2000; 2001; 2002 …
- Art; Archaeology; Architecture; Literature; Music; Philosophy; Science; +...

The year 1992 in science and technology involved many significant events, some listed below.

== Anthropology ==
- June – British anthropologist Robin Dunbar proposes Dunbar's number (approximately 150) as a cognitive limit to the number of people with whom an interpersonal relationship can be maintained in human communities.

== Astronomy ==
- January 5 – Asteroid 5751 Zao is discovered by Masahiro Koishikawa.
- January 9 – First confirmed detection of exoplanets with announcement of the discovery of several terrestrial-mass planets orbiting the pulsar PSR B1257+12 by radio astronomers Aleksander Wolszczan and Dale Frail working in the United States.
- August 30 – Discovery of 15760 Albion, the first trans-Neptunian object to be found after Pluto and Charon.
- October 31 – Pope John Paul II issues an apology and lifts the 1633 edict of the Inquisition against Galileo Galilei.

== Biology ==
- May 21 – Saola first identified in the Vũ Quang rainforest reserve of northern Vietnam. This member of the bovini tribe is the first large mammal new to science anywhere in the world for more than fifty years and it will take another two decades before live specimens are recorded.
- British evolutionary biologist Richard Dawkins delivers the 1992 Voltaire Lecture, "Viruses of the Mind", describing religion and the belief in god as a parasitic memetic virus that infects human minds.

== Computer science ==
- March 9 – ViolaWWW, the first popular Web browser, created by Pei-Yuan Wei in the United States, is publicly released for Unix.
- September – The SOCKS Internet protocol is made public.

== Earth sciences ==
- September 2 – The 1992 Nicaragua earthquake registering 7.7 M_{w} becomes the first tsunami earthquake to be captured on modern broadband seismic networks.

== Mathematics ==
- International Society for Bayesian Analysis founded by Arnold Zellner.

== Medicine ==
- October – First Cochrane Centre opens (in the UK) and the first Cochrane Review Groups (Pregnancy & Childbirth and Subfertility) are registered.
- October 29 – The Food and Drug Administration approves Depo Provera for use as a contraceptive in the United States.
- Brugada syndrome first recognised.

== Physics ==
- Hungary becomes a member of CERN.

== Technology ==
- November 23 – The IBM Simon, a touchscreen mobile phone and personal digital assistant considered the first smartphone, is introduced.
- December 3 – The first text message is sent. The message reads "Merry Christmas".

== Awards ==
- Nobel Prizes
  - Physics: Georges Charpak
  - Chemistry: Rudolph A. Marcus
  - Medicine: Edmond H. Fischer, Edwin G. Krebs
- Turing Award: Butler Lampson
- Wollaston Medal for Geology: Martin Harold Phillips Bott

== Births ==
- July 23 – Diwakar Vaish, Indian roboticist

== Deaths ==
- January 1 – Rear Admiral Grace Hopper (b. 1906), American pioneer computer scientist.
- April 6 – Isaac Asimov (b. 1920), American science author.
- April 10 – Peter D. Mitchell (b. 1920), English Nobel laureate in chemistry.
- June 13 – Remziye Hisar, (b. 1902), Turkish chemist.
- July 24 – Gavriil Ilizarov (b. 1921), Soviet orthopedic surgeon.
- August 26 – Daniel Gorenstein (b. 1923), American mathematician.
- November 5 – Jan Oort (b. 1900), Dutch astronomer.
