= 1905 in science =

The year 1905 in science and technology involved some significant events, particularly in physics, listed below.

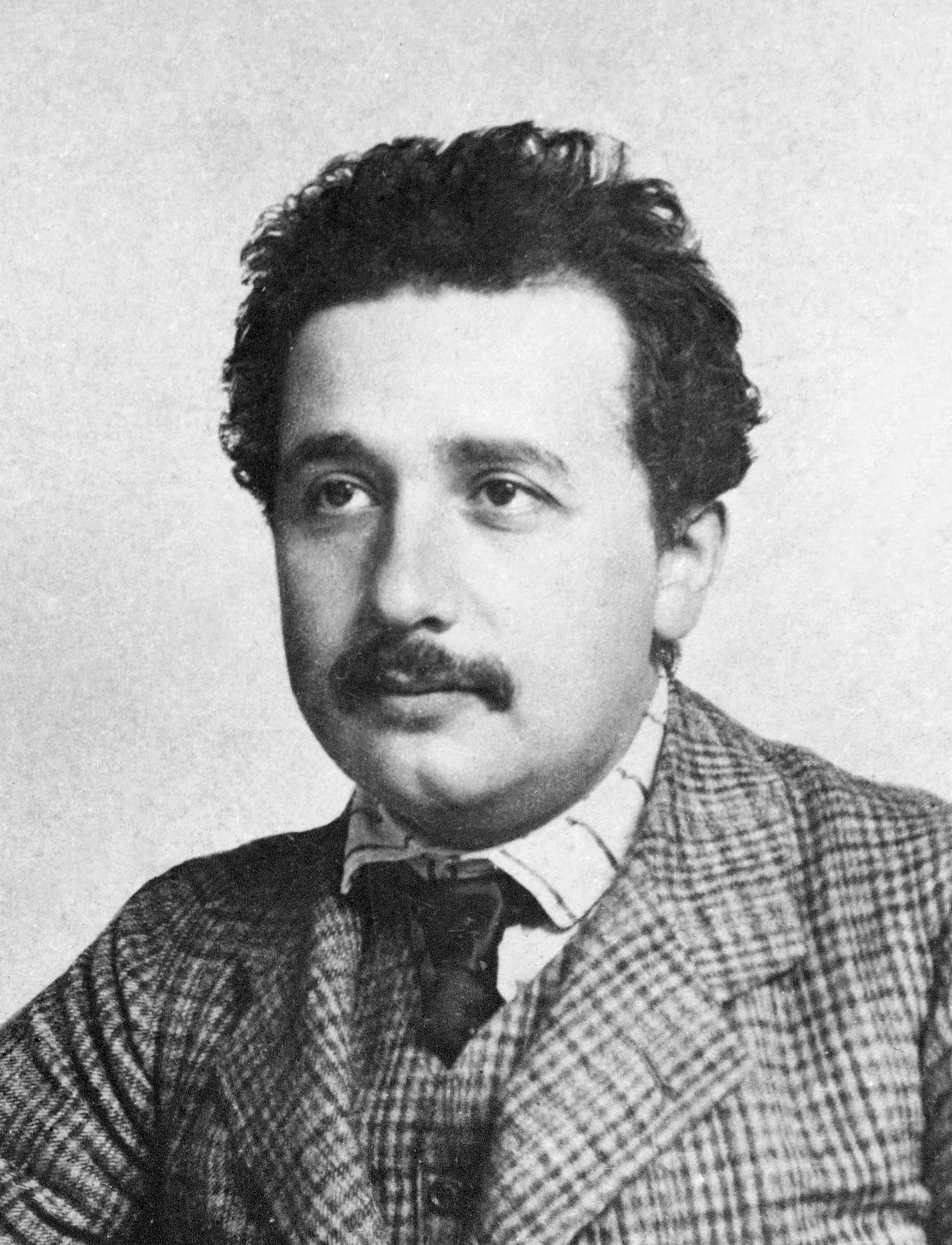
Albert Einstein

== Astronomy ==
- January 2 – Charles Dillon Perrine at Lick Observatory discovers Elara, one of the moons of Jupiter. On January 6, the observatory announces its discovery in the previous month of the Jovian moon later known as Himalia.
- The Dominion Observatory opens in Ottawa.
- Various astronomers discover the minor planets 554 Peraga through 583 Klotilde (see List of minor planets/501–600).
- The nova V604 Aquilae appears in the constellation Aquila.
- The Umov effect is noted by Nikolay Umov.

== Biology ==
- April 18 – William Bateson coins the term "genetics" in a letter to Adam Sedgwick.
- June 20 – Dr. Ernest Henry Starling introduces the word "hormone" into the English language.
- Reginald Punnett's Mendelism is published in Cambridge (U.K.), probably the first popular science book on genetics.
- Frederick Blackman proposes his law of limiting factors in relation to photosynthesis.
- Nettie Stevens and Edmund Beecher Wilson independently describe the XY sex-determination system.
- Stamen Grigorov identifies the bacterium Lactobacillus bulgaricus, a major agent in the creation of yogurt.
- Maltese doctor and archaeologist Themistocles Zammit identifies unpasteurized milk as the major source of the pathogen causing Brucellosis.
- National Association of Audubon Societies for the Protection of Wild Birds and Animals established in the United States.

== Chemistry ==
- Carl von Linde obtains pure liquid oxygen and nitrogen by cooling air.
- Alfred Einhorn synthesises the local anesthetic novocaine.
- The first commercial use of the Frank–Caro process for the nitrogen fixation reaction of calcium carbide and atmospheric nitrogen to produce calcium nitrate as a fertilizer.
- Fritz Haber and Carl Bosch develop the Haber process for making ammonia from its elements, a milestone in industrial chemistry with deep consequences in agriculture.

== Mathematics ==
- Pierre Fatou defines the Mandelbrot set.
- Oswald Veblen proves the Jordan curve theorem.
- Martin Kutta describes the popular fourth-order Runge-Kutta method.
- James Cullen, S.J., begins the study of Cullen numbers.
- Emanuel Lasker proves the Lasker–Noether theorem for the special case of polynomial rings.
- Karl Pearson proposes the random walk in a letter to Nature.

== Paleontology ==
- May 12 – The Natural History Museum, London, unveils its popular exhibit of "Dippy", an exact replica of the skeleton of a Diplodocus carnegii dinosaur.
- The Saurian Expedition led by John C. Merriam recovers many specimens of ichthyosaur.
- Tyrannosaurus rex is described and named by Henry Fairfield Osborn.

== Physics ==
- Albert Einstein (at this time resident in Bern) completes his doctoral thesis, A New Determination of Molecular Dimensions on April 30, submitting it to the University of Zurich on July 30, and publishes his four annus mirabilis papers in Annalen der Physik (Leipzig). Because of this, 1905 is said to be the miraculous year for physics, and its 100th anniversary (2005) is declared the World Year of Physics.
  - "On a Heuristic Viewpoint Concerning the Production and Transformation of Light", received March 18 and published June 9, explains the photoelectric effect through quantum mechanics.
  - "Über die von der molekularkinetischen Theorie der Wärme geforderte Bewegung von in ruhenden Flüssigkeiten suspendierten Teilchen" ("On the Motion of Small Particles Suspended in a Stationary Liquid, as Required by the Molecular Kinetic Theory of Heat"), based on his doctoral research, received May 11 and published July 18, delineates a stochastic model of Brownian motion.
  - "On the Electrodynamics of Moving Bodies", received June 30 and published September 26, formulates his theory of special relativity.
  - "Does the Inertia of a Body Depend Upon Its Energy Content?", received September 27 and published November 21, deduces the law of mass–energy equivalence, E = mc².

== Physiology and medicine ==
- February 9 – Dr. Prince A. Morrow begins the movement in the United States for sex education with the founding of the Society of Sanitary and Moral Prophylaxis.
- Nikolai Korotkov first describes auscultatory blood pressure measurement.
- Karl Landsteiner first describes Meconium ileus.
- Fritz Schaudinn and Erich Hoffmann discover the bacterium that is responsible for syphilis, a spiral-shaped spirochete called Treponema pallidum.

== Psychology ==
- Sigmund Freud publishes Drei Abhandlungen zur Sexualtheorie (Three Essays on the Theory of Sexuality) and Der Witz und seine Beziehung zum Unbewußten (Jokes and their Relation to the Unconscious).
- June – Alfred Binet and Théodore Simon publish the first Binet-Simon Intelligence Test for intelligence testing of children with mental retardation.

== Technology ==
- January 17 – Samuel J. Bens of San Francisco is granted the earliest patent for a practical "endless chain saw" for felling trees.
- October – First bascule bridge to the design of Joseph Strauss opened, in Cleveland, Ohio.
- Canal Lake Concrete Arch Bridge built in Ontario.
- Pathé Frères colorise black-and-white films by machine.
- Sylvanus Bowser introduces his self-measuring gasoline pump in the United States.
- Alfred Buchi files a patent for the turbocharger.
- Paul de Vivie invents a two-speed rear-wheel derailleur gear for bicycles.
- Pipe manufactures the first automobile with a hemi engine.
- Walter Griffiths invents a manually powered domestic vacuum cleaner.
- Reginald Fessenden invents the superheterodyne receiver.
- Marconi invents the directional antenna.

== Awards ==
- Nobel Prizes
  - Physics – Philipp Eduard Anton von Lenard
  - Chemistry – Johann Friedrich Wilhelm Adolf von Baeyer
  - Medicine – Robert Koch

== Births ==
- February 1 – Emilio Segrè (died 1989), Italian-born physicist, Nobel laureate
- February 15 – Willem Karel Dicke (died 1962), Dutch pediatrician
- February 17 – Rózsa Péter (died 1977), Hungarian mathematician, "founding mother of recursive function theory"
- February 23 – Derrick Henry Lehmer (died 1991), American mathematician
- March 18 – Thomas Townsend Brown (died 1985), American inventor
- March 26 – Viktor Frankl (died 1997), Austrian psychotherapist
- March 27 – Elsie MacGill (died 1980), Canadian aeronautical engineer, "Queen of the Hurricanes"
- April 13 – Bruno Rossi (died 1993), Italian physicist and astronomer
- April 18 – George H. Hitchings (died 1998), American scientist, Nobel laureate in Medicine
- April 20 – Albrecht Unsöld (died 1995), German astronomer
- July 7 – Marie-Louise Dubreil-Jacotin (died 1972), French mathematician
- August 1 – Helen Sawyer Hogg (died 1993), American-born astronomer
- August 11 – Erwin Chargaff (died 2002), Austro-Hungarian-born biochemist
- August 16 – Marian Rejewski (died 1980), Polish mathematician and cryptologist
- August 31 – Robert Bacher (died 2004), American nuclear physicist
- September 3 – Carl David Anderson (died 1991), American physicist, Nobel laureate
- September 6 – Walther Müller (died 1979), German-born American physicist
- September 17 – Hans Freudenthal (died 1990), American mathematician
- September 22 – Eugen Sänger (died 1964), Austrian-born aerospace engineer
- September 24 – Severo Ochoa (died 1993), Spanish biochemist, Nobel laureate
- September 30 – Nevill Francis Mott (died 1996), English physicist, Nobel laureate
- October 15 – C. P. Snow (died 1980), English physicist and novelist
- October 22
  - Karl Guthe Jansky (died 1950), American physicist
  - Felix Bloch (died 1983), Swiss physicist, Nobel laureate
- October 31 – Harry Harlow (died 1981), American psychologist
- November 10 – Louis Harold Gray (died 1965), English physicist, inventor of the field of radiobiology
- December 7 – Gerard Kuiper (died 1973), Dutch-born astronomer
- December 16 – Piet Hein (died 1996), Danish mathematician
- December 22 – Tommy Flowers (died 1998), English computer engineer

== Deaths ==
- January 4 – Paul Henry (born 1848), French astronomer
- January 14 – Ernst Abbe (born 1840), German physicist
- March 24 – Jules Verne (born 1828), French science fiction author
- April 14 – Otto Wilhelm von Struve (born 1819), Russian astronomer
- June 18 – Per Teodor Cleve (born 1840), Swedish chemist
- August 20 – Franz Reuleaux (born 1829), German mechanical engineer
- September 19 – Thomas Barnardo (born 1845), Irish-born physician and philanthropist
- October 6 – Ferdinand von Richthofen (born 1833), German geologist
- November 14 – Robert Whitehead (born 1823), English marine engineer
- November 15 (O.S. November 2) – Ivan Sechenov (born 1829), "the father of Russian physiology"
