= 1906 in science =

The year 1906 in science and technology involved some significant events, listed below.

== Chemistry ==
- Charles Barkla discovers that each element has a characteristic X-ray and that the degree of penetration of these X-rays is related to the atomic weight of the element.
- Mikhail Tsvet first names the chromatography technique for organic compound separation, in the course of demonstrating that chlorophyll is not a single chemical compound.

== Geology ==
- April 18 – The San Francisco earthquake, an estimated 7.9 on the Richter scale and centered on the San Andreas Fault, strikes near San Francisco, California. The earthquake and fire destroy over 80% of the buildings in the city, and kill as many as 6,000 people. Harry Fielding Reid devises the elastic-rebound theory to account for earthquake mechanism.
- Richard Oldham argues that the Earth has a molten interior.

== Mathematics ==
- Andrey Markov produces his first theories on Markov chain processes.
- Axel Thue uses the Thue–Morse sequence to found the study of combinatorics on words.

== Medicine ==
- September – Last death from yellow fever in the Panama Canal Zone following a mosquito eradication program led by William C. Gorgas.
- October–December – Martha Baer undergoes sex reassignment surgery to become Karl M. Baer in Germany.
- November 3 – A speech given by Alois Alzheimer for the first time presents the pathology and clinical symptoms of pre-senile dementia together; the condition will rapidly become known as Alzheimer's disease.
- BCG (Bacilli-Calmette-Guerin) immunization for tuberculosis first developed.
- Transmission of dengue fever by the Aedes mosquito is confirmed.
- Frederick Hopkins proposes the existence of vitamins and suggests that a lack of them causes scurvy and rickets.
- Charles Sherrington publishes The Integrative Action of the Nervous System.
- Clemens Peter von Pirquet, with Béla Schick, coins the term "allergy" to describe hypersensitive reactions.
- Royal Victoria Hospital, Belfast, is completed, the first such air conditioned building in the world.
- George Newman publishes Infant Mortality: a Social Problem in England.
- August von Wassermann develops a complement fixation test for the diagnosis of syphilis.

== Physics ==
- Walther Nernst presents a formulation of the third law of thermodynamics.

== Technology ==
- January – Lee De Forest files a patent for the Audion vacuum tube, which helps usher in the age of electronics.
- February 10 – Launch of British battleship HMS Dreadnought.
- March 18 – At Montesson in France, Romanian inventor Traian Vuia becomes the first person to achieve an unassisted takeoff in a heavier-than-air powered monoplane, but it is incapable of sustained flight.
- October 18 – German inventor Arthur Korn demonstrates the transmission of a photograph electronically over a distance of 1800 km using his Bildetelegraph or phototelautograph system.
- December 24 – Reginald Fessenden makes the first radio broadcast, including a musical recording, a violin solo, and readings, from Brant Rock, Massachusetts.
- The first practicable gyrocompass is invented by Hermann Anschütz-Kaempfe in Germany.

== Events ==
- November 12 – First displays of the Deutsches Museum open to the public in Munich.

== Publications ==
- African Invertebrates begins publication as Annals of the Natal Government Museum; it will be continuing publication more than a century later.

== Awards ==
- Nobel Prizes
  - Physics – Sir J. J. Thomson
  - Chemistry – Henri Moissan
  - Medicine – Camillo Golgi, Santiago Ramón y Cajal
- Hughes Medal – Hertha Ayrton

== Births ==
- January 6 – G. Ledyard Stebbins (died 2000), American botanist and geneticist.
- January 10 – Grigore Moisil (died 1973), Romanian mathematician.
- January 11 – Albert Hofmann (died 2008), Swiss chemist.
- February 3
  - George Adamson (died 1989), Indian-born wildlife conservationist.
  - Ilona Banga (died 1998), Hungarian biochemist.
- February 4 – Clyde Tombaugh (died 1997), American astronomer.
- February 17 – Elizabeth M. Ramsey (died 1993), American research physician.
- February 18 – Hans Asperger (died 1980), Austrian pediatrician.
- April 28 – Kurt Gödel (died 1978), Austrian mathematician.
- June 13 – Bruno de Finetti (died 1985), Italian statistician.
- June 15 – Gordon Welchman (died 1985), English-born mathematician and cryptanalyst.
- June 18 – Orvan Hess (died 2002), American obstetrician.
- June 23 – Derek Jackson (died 1982), Swiss-born British spectroscopist and steeplechase rider (also his twin brother Vivian).
- June 28 – Maria Göppert (died 1972), German-born theoretical physicist, recipient of the Nobel Prize in Physics.
- July 2 – Hans Bethe (died 2005), German-born physicist, recipient of the Nobel Prize in Physics.
- July 7 – William Feller (died 1970), Croatian-born American mathematician.
- August 19 – Philo Farnsworth (died 1971), American television pioneer.
- September 1 – Karl August Folkers (died 1997), American biochemist.
- September 4 – Max Delbrück (died 1981), German-born biologist.
- September 30 – Vera Faddeeva (died 1983), Soviet mathematician.
- October 2 – Willy Ley (died 1969), German-born scientific populariser.
- November 3 – Carl Benjamin Boyer (died 1976), American historian of mathematics.
- November 5 – Fred Lawrence Whipple (died 2004), American astronomer, coins the term "dirty snowball" to explain the nature of comets.
- November 18 – George Wald (died 1997), American scientist.
- December 2 – Peter Carl Goldmark (died 1977), Hungarian-born American engineer
- December 9 – Grace Hopper (died 1992), American computer scientist.
- December 25 – Ernst Ruska (died 1988), German physicist, recipient of the Nobel Prize in Physics.

== Deaths ==
- January 13 (Old Style December 31, 1905) – Alexander Stepanovich Popov (born 1859), Russian physicist.
- January 14 – Hermann Sprengel (born 1834), German-born British chemist.
- February 27 – Samuel Pierpont Langley (born 1834), American astronomer.
- March 8 – Henry Baker Tristram (born 1822), English ornithologist.
- April 19 – Pierre Curie (born 1859), French winner of the Nobel Prize in Physics, in road accident.
- May 15 – James Blyth (born 1839), Scottish electrical engineer.
- July 5 – Paul Drude (born 1863), German physicist (suicide).
- September 5 – Ludwig Boltzmann (born 1844), Austrian physicist.
