= 1917 in science =

The year 1917 in science and technology involved some significant events, listed below.

== Biology ==
- September 3 – French-Canadian microbiologist Félix d'Hérelle, working at the Pasteur Institute in Paris, announces his discovery of a bacteriophage.
- D'Arcy Wentworth Thompson's On Growth and Form is published.

== Mathematics ==
- Paul Ehrenfest gives a conditional principle for a three-dimensional space.

== Medicine ==
- March 23 – Canadian physician Charles A. Hunter first describes the rare genetic disorder Hunter syndrome.
- Japanese ophthalmologisdt Shinobu Ishihara publishes his color perception test.
- Austrian physician Julius Wagner-Jauregg discovers malarial pyrotherapy for general paresis of the insane.

== Physics ==
- Albert Einstein introduces the idea of stimulated radiation emission.
- Nuclear fission: Ernest Rutherford (at the Victoria University of Manchester) achieves nuclear transmutation of nitrogen into oxygen, using alpha particles directed at nitrogen ^{14}N + α → ^{17}O + p, the first observation of a nuclear reaction, in which he also discovers and names the proton.

== Technology ==
- September 13 – Release in the United States of the first film made in Technicolor System 1, a two-color process, The Gulf Between.
- Alvin D. and Kelvin Keech introduce the "banjulele-banjo", an early form of the banjolele.
- Gilbert Vernam jointly reinvents the one-time pad encryption system.

== Awards ==
- Nobel Prize
  - Physics – Charles Glover Barkla (announced 12 November 1918; presented 1 June 1920)
  - Chemistry – not awarded
  - Medicine – not awarded

== Births ==
- January 19 – Graham Higman (died 2008), English mathematician.
- January 25 – Ilya Prigogine (died 2003), Russian-born winner of the Nobel Prize in Chemistry.
- February 14 – Herbert A. Hauptman (died 2011), American mathematical biophysicist, winner of the Nobel Prize in Chemistry.
- March 23 – Howard McKern (died 2009), Australian analytical and organic chemist.
- March 24 – John Kendrew (died 1997), English molecular biologist, winner of the Nobel Prize in Chemistry.
- April 10 – Robert Burns Woodward (died 1979), American organic chemist, winner of the Nobel Prize in Chemistry.
- April 18 – Brian Harold Mason (died 2009), New Zealand-born geochemist and mineralogist who was one of the pioneers in the study of meteorites.
- May 14 – W. T. Tutte (died 2002), English-born mathematician and cryptanalyst.
- June 1 – William S. Knowles (died 2012), American winner of the Nobel Prize in Chemistry.
- June 2 – Heinz Sielmann (died 2006), German zoological filmmaker.
- June 15 – John Fenn (died 2010), American analytical chemist, winner of the Nobel Prize in Chemistry.
- July 1 – Humphry Osmond (died 2004), English-born psychiatrist.
- July 15 – Walter S. Graf (died 2015), American cardiologist and pioneer of paramedic emergency medical services.
- July 22 – H. Boyd Woodruff (died 2017), American microbiologist.
- August 21 – Xu Shunshou (died 1968), Chinese aeronautical engineer.
- September 23 – Asima Chatterjee, née Mookerjee (died 2006), Indian organic chemist.
- October 2 – Christian de Duve (died 2013), English-born Belgian biologist, winner of the Nobel Prize in Physiology or Medicine
- October 8 – Rodney Porter (died 1985), English biochemist, winner of the Nobel Prize in Physiology or Medicine.
- November 22 – Andrew Huxley (died 2012), English winner of the Nobel Prize in Physiology or Medicine.
- December 9 – James Rainwater (died 1986), American winner of the Nobel Prize in Physics.
- December 16 – Arthur C. Clarke (died 2008), English-born science fiction author and inventor.
- December 20 – David Bohm (died 1992), American-born theoretical physicist, philosopher and neuropsychologist.

== Deaths ==
- February 11 – Laura Forster (born 1858), Australian physician, died on war service.
- February 26 – Joseph Jules Dejerine (born 1849), French neurologist.
- March 8 – Ferdinand von Zeppelin (born 1838), German founder of the Zeppelin airship company.
- March 31 – Emil von Behring (born 1854), German physiologist, winner of the Nobel Prize in Physiology or Medicine in 1901.
- July 27 – Emil Theodor Kocher (born 1841), Swiss surgeon, winner of the Nobel Prize in Physiology or Medicine in 1909.
- August 3 – Ferdinand Georg Frobenius (born 1849), German mathematician.
- December 17 – Elizabeth Garrett Anderson (born 1836), English physician.
