= 1912 in science =

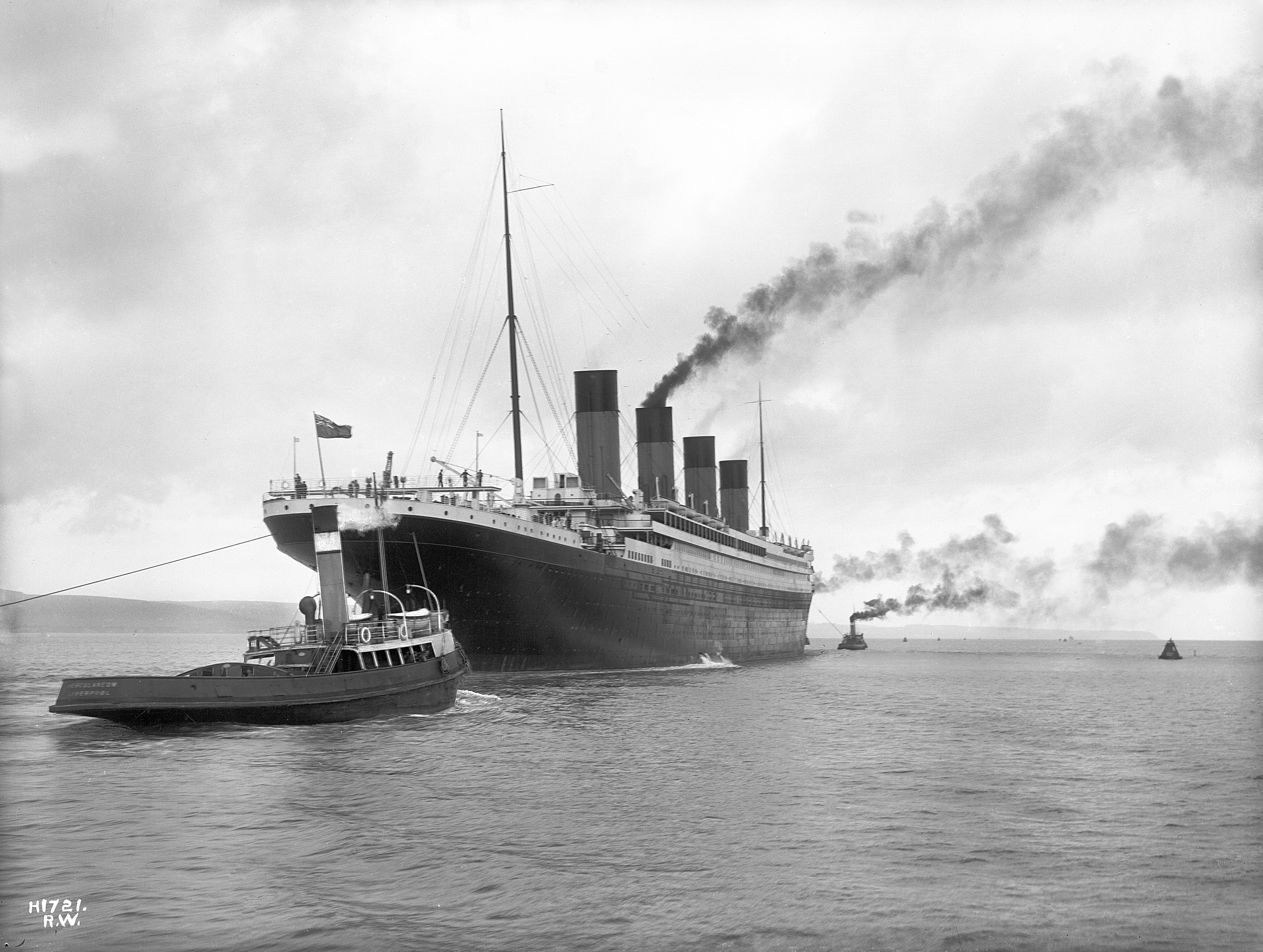
The RMS Titanic represented the pinnacle of ship design in 1912

The year 1912 in science and technology involved some significant events, listed below.

== Archaeology ==
- December 6 – The Nefertiti Bust is found at Amarna in Egypt by the German Oriental Company (Deutsche Orient-Gesellschaft – DOG), led by German archaeologist Ludwig Borchardt.

== Astronomy ==
- At the beginning of this year an extreme decadal variation in length of day produces mean solar days having a duration of 86400.00389 seconds of Terrestrial Time (or ephemeris time), the slowest rotation of Earth's crust ever to be recorded.

== Biology ==
- July 23 – Horace Donisthorpe first discovers Anergates atratulus in the New Forest, England.
- Reginald Punnett is appointed as first Arthur Balfour Professor of Genetics in the University of Cambridge (U.K.), probably the oldest chair of genetics in the English-speaking world.

== Chemistry ==
- Peter Debye derives the T-cubed law for the low temperature heat capacity of a nonmetallic solid.
- Casimir Funk introduces the concept of vitamins.
- J. J. Thomson finds the first evidence for multiple isotopes of a stable (non-radioactive) element as part of his exploration into the composition of canal rays (positive ions).
- Fritz Klatte, a German chemist working for Griesheim-Elektron, discovers polyvinyl acetate and applies for a patent for preparing the monomer, vinyl acetate, by addition of acetic acid to acetylene using a mercuric chloride catalyst although it is not successfully commercialized at this time.
- Wilbur Scoville devises the Scoville scale for measuring the heat of peppers.
- December 24 – Merck files patent applications for synthesis of the entactogenic drug MDMA, developed by Anton Köllisch.

== Earth sciences ==
- January – Alfred Wegener proposes a fully formulated theory of continental drift and gives the supercontinent Pangaea its name.
- June 6 – The Novarupta volcano on the Alaska Peninsula comes into being through a VEI 6 eruption, the largest this century.

== Exploration ==
- January 17 – British polar explorer Robert Falcon Scott and a team of four reach the South Pole to find that Amundsen has beaten them to it. They will die on the return journey, just eleven miles from a polar base (March 16–29).
- March 7 – Roald Amundsen announces in Hobart that his expedition reached the South Pole on last December 14.

== History of science ==
- November 20 – History of Medicine Society holds its first meeting, under the chairmanship of Sir William Osler, in London.
- Georgius Agricola's De re metallica (1556) is first published in an English translation, made by Herbert and Lou Henry Hoover, in London.
- Voynich manuscript discovered.

== Mathematics ==
- Publication of the 2nd volume of Principia Mathematica by Alfred North Whitehead and Bertrand Russell, one of the most important and seminal works in mathematical logic and philosophy.
- Karl F. Sundman solves the n-body problem for n=3.
- Axel Thue discovers Pisot–Vijayaraghavan numbers.

== Medicine ==
- Harvey Cushing identifies Cushing's disease, caused by a malfunction of the pituitary gland.
- Solomon Carter Fuller first names Alzheimer's disease.
- Hakaru Hashimoto first describes the symptoms of Hashimoto's thyroiditis.

== Metallurgy ==
- Krupp engineers Benno Strauss and Eduard Maurer patent austenitic stainless steel (October 17) and Elwood Haynes (in the United States) and Harry Brearley (of Brown-Firth in Sheffield, England) independently discover martensitic stainless steel alloys.

== Meteorology ==
- April 5 – Milutin Milanković's Contribution to the mathematical theory of climate, his first work in this field, is published in Belgrade.

== Paleontology ==
- December 18 – Skull of "Piltdown Man" presented to the Geological Society of London as the fossilised remains of a previously unknown form of early human. It is revealed to be a hoax in 1953.

== Physics ==
- November 11 – Lawrence Bragg presents his derivation of Bragg's law for the angles for coherent and incoherent scattering from a crystal lattice.
- Max von Laue suggests using crystal lattices to diffract X-rays.
- Walter Friedrich and Paul Knipping diffract X-rays in zinc blende.
- Victor Hess discovers that the ionization of air increases with altitude, indicating the existence of cosmic radiation.

== Psychology ==
- Carl Jung publishes Wandlungen und Symbole der Libido (Psychology of the Unconscious), based on lectures delivered at Fordham University and precipitating a break with Sigmund Freud.
- Sabina Spielrein delivers her paper on "Destruction as the Cause of Coming Into Being" to the Vienna Psychoanalytic Society.

== Technology ==
- April 14–15 – Sinking of the Titanic: The ocean liner RMS Titanic strikes an iceberg and sinks on her maiden voyage from the United Kingdom to the United States.
- The British Royal Navy introduces the director ship gun fire-control system using the Dreyer Table, a mechanical analogue computer.
- The Sperry Corporation develops the first gyroscopic autopilot ("gyroscopic stabilizer apparatus") for aviation use.
- The earth inductor compass is first patented by Donald M. Bliss.

== Other events ==
- American ornithologist Robert Ridgway publishes Color Standards and Color Nomenclature.
- Conférence internationale de l'heure radiotélégraphique.
- First International Congress of Eugenics held in London with the support of Leonard Darwin, Winston Churchill, Auguste Forel, Alexander Graham Bell, Charles Davenport and other prominent scientists.

== Awards ==
- Nobel Prize
  - Physics – Gustaf Dalén
  - Chemistry – Victor Grignard; Paul Sabatier
  - Medicine – Alexis Carrel

== Births ==
- January 21 – Konrad Emil Bloch (died 2000), German-born biochemist, winner of the Nobel Prize in Physiology or Medicine.
- January 27 – Francis Rogallo (died 2009), American aeronautical engineer.
- January 30 – Werner Hartmann (died 1988), German physicist.
- February 13 – Natan Yavlinsky (died 1962), Russian nuclear physicist.
- February 25 – Preben von Magnus (died 1973), Danish virologist.
- March 1 – Boris Chertok (died 2011), Russian rocket designer.
- March 13 – Charles Schepens (died 2006), Belgian-born American ophthalmologist.
- March 19 – Bill Frankland (died 2020), English immunologist.
- March 23 – Wernher von Braun (died 1977), German-born physicist and engineer.
- April 19 – Glenn T. Seaborg (died 1999), American physical chemist, winner of the Nobel Prize in Chemistry.
- May 21 – Akiva Vroman (died 1989), Dutch-born Israeli geologist, Israel Prize recipient.
- May 22 – Herbert C. Brown (died 2004), English-born chemist, winner of the Nobel Prize in Chemistry.
- May 28 – Ruby Payne-Scott (died 1981), Australian radioastronomer.
- May 30 – Julius Axelrod (died 2004), American biochemist, winner of the Nobel Prize in Physiology or Medicine.
- May 31 – Chien-Shiung Wu (died 1997), Chinese-American nuclear physicist, winner of the Wolf Prize in Physics.
- June 23 – Alan Turing (died 1954), English computer scientist.
- June 30 – Ludwig Bölkow (died 2003), German aeronautical engineer.
- August 11 – Norman Levinson (died 1975), American mathematician.
- August 13 – Salvador Luria (died 1991), Italian-born biologist, winner of the Nobel Prize in Physiology or Medicine.
- August 30 – Edward Mills Purcell (died 1997), American physicist, winner of the Nobel Prize in Physics.
- September 7 – David Packard (died 1996), American electronics engineer.
- September 22 – Herbert Mataré (died 2011), German physicist.
- October 1 – Kathleen Ollerenshaw (died 2014), English mathematician.
- November 14 – Tung-Yen Lin (died 2003), Chinese-born civil engineer.
- November 19 – George Emil Palade (died 2008), Romanian-born microbiologist, winner of the Nobel Prize in Physiology or Medicine.
- November 22 – Paul Zamecnik (died 2009), American scientist playing a central role in the early history of molecular biology.

== Deaths ==
- February 10 – Joseph Lister (born 1827), English inventor of antiseptic.
- February 12 – Osborne Reynolds (born 1842), British physicist.
- March 19 – Thomas Harrison Montgomery Jr. (born 1873), American zoologist and cell biologist.
- March 28 – Paul-Émile Lecoq de Boisbaudran (born 1838), French chemist.
- March 29
  - Robert Falcon Scott (born 1868), English Antarctic explorer.
  - Edward Wilson (born 1872), English physician and naturalist.
- April 18 – Martha Ripley (born 1843), American physician.
- May 4 – Nettie Stevens (born 1861), American geneticist.
- May 30 – Wilbur Wright (born 1867), American aviation pioneer.
- July 17 – Henri Poincaré (born 1854), French mathematician.
- August 7 – François-Alphonse Forel (born 1841), Swiss pioneer of limnology.
- November 23 – Charles Bourseul (born 1829), French telegraph engineer.
- December 17 – Spiru Haret (born 1851), Romanian mathematician, astronomer and politician.
- December 21 – Paul Gordan (born 1837), German Jewish mathematician, "the king of invariant theory".
