= 1907 in science =

The year 1907 in science and technology involved some significant events, listed below.

== Astronomy ==
- Alfred Russel Wallace publishes the book Is Mars Habitable?, a refutation of Percival Lowell's theory of mars canals, and the first work in the emerging field of astrobiology.

== Chemistry ==
- June 6 – Persil laundry detergent is first marketed by Henkel of Düsseldorf, Germany, the first to combine a bleaching agent (sodium perborate) with a base washing agent (sodium silicate) commercially.
- Emil Fischer artificially synthesizes peptide amino acid chains and thereby shows that amino acids in proteins are connected by amino group-acid group bonds.
- Hermann Staudinger prepares the first synthetic β-lactam.
- Georges Urbain discovers Lutetium (from Lutetia, the ancient name of Paris).

== Geology ==
- January 14 – 1907 Kingston earthquake: Earthquake in Kingston, Jamaica.
- c. March 28 – Volcanic eruption of Ksudach in the Kamchatka Peninsula.
- Bertram Boltwood proposes that the amount of lead in uranium and thorium ores might be used to determine the Earth's age and crudely dates some rocks to have ages between 410 and 2200 million years.
- The Moine Thrust Belt in Scotland is identified by Ben Peach and John Horne, one of the first to be discovered.
- The rare phosphate mineral tarbuttite is first discovered at Broken Hill, Barotziland-North-Western Rhodesia.
- Ludovic Mrazek describes and names diapirs.

== Mathematics ==
- Paul Koebe conjectures the result of the Koebe quarter theorem.

== Medicine ==
- Paul Ehrlich develops a chemotherapeutic cure for sleeping sickness.
- George Soper identifies "Typhoid Mary" Mallon as an asymptomatic carrier of typhoid in New York.
- Dengue fever becomes the second disease shown to be caused by a virus.
- Foreign accent syndrome is first described by French neurologist Pierre Marie.
- Indiana, in the United States, becomes the world's first legislature to place laws permitting compulsory sterilization for eugenic purposes on the statute book.

== Paleontology ==
- October 21 – Jaw of Homo heidelbergensis (Mauer 1) found.

== Physics ==
- The Ehrenfest model of diffusion is proposed by Tatiana and Paul Ehrenfest to explain the second law of thermodynamics.
- Albert Einstein introduces the principle of equivalence of gravitation and inertia and uses it to predict the gravitational redshift.

== Psychology ==
- Ivan Pavlov demonstrates conditioned responses with salivating dogs.
- Vladimir Bekhterev begins publication of Objective Psychology.

== Technology ==
- August 10 – Peking to Paris motor race concludes after 2 months, won by Prince Scipione Borghese driving a 7-litre 35/45 hp Itala.
- August 29 – The partially completed Quebec Bridge collapses.
- October 17 – Guglielmo Marconi initiates commercial transatlantic radio communications between his high power longwave wireless telegraphy stations in Clifden, Ireland, and Glace Bay, Nova Scotia.
- Lee de Forest invents the triode thermionic amplifier, starting the development of electronics as a practical technology.
- Furuholmen Lighthouse in Sweden is the world's first to be equipped with AGA's Dalén light incorporating Gustaf Dalén's invention of the sun valve which turns the beacon's accumulator gas supply on and off using daylight, and for which Dalén will be awarded the Nobel Prize in Physics in 1912.
- Ole Evinrude invents the first practical outboard motor, in the United States.
- Rudge-Whitworth of Coventry (England) produce the first detachable wire wheel for automobiles.
- The Autochrome Lumière is the first color photography process marketed.
- James Murray Spangler invents the first Hoover vacuum cleaner in the United States.
- Samuel Simon patents a screenprinting process in the United Kingdom.

== Zoology ==
- Carl Hagenbeck opens the Tierpark Hagenbeck in Stellingen, near Hamburg, Germany, the first zoo to use open moated enclosures, rather than barred cages, to better approximate animals' natural environments.
- December 28 – Last confirmed sighting of a Huia in New Zealand.

== Awards ==
- Nobel Prizes
  - Physics – Albert Abraham Michelson
  - Chemistry – Eduard Buchner
  - Medicine – Charles Louis Alphonse Laveran
- Order of Merit: Florence Nightingale

== Births ==
- January 12 – Sergei Korolev (died 1966), Ukrainian-born space scientist.
- February 20 – Arnold Wilkins (died 1985), English pioneer of radar.
- February 26 – John Bowlby (died 1990), English child psychologist.
- March 4 – Rosalind Pitt-Rivers, née Henley (died 1990), English biochemist.
- March 18 – J. Z. Young (died 1997), English zoologist and neurophysiologist.
- April 15 – Nikolaas Tinbergen (died 1988), Dutch ethologist, ornithologist and Nobel Prize in Physiology or Medicine laureate.
- June 1
  - Helen Megaw (died 2002), Irish crystallographer.
  - Frank Whittle (died 1996), English aeronautical engineer.
- June 25 – Hans Daniel Jensen (died 1973), German physicist.
- June 26 – Robert Gwyn Macfarlane (died 1987), British hematologist.
- July 1 – Norman Pirie (died 1997), British virologist.
- July 7 – Robert A. Heinlein (died 1988), American hard science fiction author.
- August 30 – John Mauchly (died 1980), American co-inventor of the ENIAC computer.
- September 7 – Konstantin Petrzhak (died 1998), Polish-born physicist.
- September 14 – Solomon Asch (died 1996), Polish-born social psychologist.
- September 30 – Stanley Hooker (died 1984), English aeronautical engineer.
- October 2 – Alexander R. Todd (died 1997), Scottish biochemist and Nobel Prize in Chemistry laureate.
- November 13 – Wang Yinglai (died 2001), Chinese biochemist.
- December 21 – Horace Hodes (died 1989), American medical researcher.
- December 25 – Rufus P. Turner (died 1982), African American electronic engineer.

== Deaths ==
- January 20
  - Agnes Mary Clerke (born 1842), Irish astronomer and author.
  - Dmitri Mendeleev (born 1834), Russian chemist.
- February 5 (O.S. January 22) – Nikolai Menshutkin (born 1842), Russian chemist.
- May 19 – Sir Benjamin Baker (born 1840), English civil engineer.
- June 7 – Edward Routh (born 1831), English mathematician.
- June 18 – Alexander Stewart Herschel (born 1836), British astronomer.
- July 14 – Sir William Henry Perkin (born 1838), English chemist.
- November 22 – Asaph Hall (born 1829), American astronomer.
- December 17 – William Thomson, 1st Baron Kelvin (born 1824), British physicist.
