= 1838 in science =

The year 1838 in science and technology involved some significant events, listed below.

== Astronomy ==
- Friedrich Wilhelm Bessel makes the first accurate measurement of distance to a star, 61 Cygni, using parallax. Thomas Henderson (Alpha Centauri) and Friedrich Georg Wilhelm Struve (Vega) announce their measurements using parallax shortly afterwards.
- Claude Servais Mathias Pouillet makes the first quantitative measurements of the heat emitted by the Sun.
- Peter Andreas Hansen publishes a revision of the lunar theory, Fundamenta nova investigationis orbitae verae quam luna perlustrat.

== Biology ==
- May 9 – Royal Agricultural Society of England established.
- Proteins discovered by Gerardus Johannes Mulder and named by Jöns Jakob Berzelius.
- Matthias Schleiden discovers that all living plant tissue is composed of cells.
- Andrew Smith begins publication of Illustrations of the Zoology of South Africa.

== Chemistry ==
- Bulat steel alloy developed by Pavel Petrovich Anosov.
- Electrotyping is invented by Moritz von Jacobi in Russia.

== Exploration ==
- August 18 – The United States Exploring Expedition under U.S. Navy Lieutenant Charles Wilkes sets sail for a four-year circumnavigation westabout.
- In Australia, Charles Sturt proves that the Hume and Murray are the same river.

== Mathematics ==
- Augustus De Morgan introduces the term 'mathematical induction'.
- S. D. Poisson publishes Recherches sur la probabilité des jugements en matière criminelle et en matière civile, containing his work on probability theory and introducing Poisson distribution.

== Medicine ==
- Jean Esquirol publishes Des maladies mentales considerées sous le rapport médicale, hygiènique et médico-legal in Paris. This includes the first description of what will later become known as Down syndrome.
- John Gorrie experiments with cooling the hospital wards of malarial patients in Apalachicola, Florida.

== Technology ==
- January 6/11 – Samuel Morse first publicly demonstrates the electrical telegraph, at Morristown, New Jersey.
- April 4–22 – The paddle steamer SS Sirius (1837) makes the Transatlantic Crossing to New York from Cork, Ireland, in eighteen days, though not using steam continuously.
- April 8–23 – Isambard Kingdom Brunel's paddle steamer SS Great Western (1838) makes the Transatlantic Crossing to New York from Avonmouth, England, in fifteen days, inaugurating a regular steamship service.
- Liverpool-built barque Ironsides becomes the first large ocean-going iron ship.
- William Barnett obtains a United Kingdom patent for an internal combustion engine, the first with compression of the gas/air mixture in the cylinder.
- David Bruce, Jr., invents the Pivotal Typecaster, which replaces hand typecasting in printing.
- Boris Semyonovich Yakobi invents electrotyping, which is used in printing and reproduction of art objects.
- The first screw-pile lighthouse is built by Alexander Mitchell on Maplin Sands in the Thames Estuary.
- Charles Wheatstone originates the stereoscope.

== Events ==
- A statue of English chemist and physicist John Dalton (in marble by Sir Francis Chantrey) is erected in Manchester during the scientist's lifetime.

== Awards ==
- Copley Medal: Carl Friedrich Gauss; Michael Faraday
- Wollaston Medal: Richard Owen

== Births ==
- January 5 – Camille Jordan (died 1922), French mathematician.
- January 29 – Edward W. Morley (died 1923), American chemist.
- February 18 – Ernst Mach (died 1916), Austrian physicist.
- March 3 – George William Hill (died 1914), American astronomer.
- March 12 – William H. Perkin (died 1907), English chemist.
- March 15 – Alice Cunningham Fletcher (died 1923), Cuban-born American ethnologist, anthropologist and social scientist.
- April 8 – Ferdinand von Zeppelin (died 1917), German founder of the Zeppelin airship company.
- April 16 – Ernest Solvay (died 1922), Belgian chemist.
- April 18 – Paul-Émile Lecoq de Boisbaudran (died 1912), French chemist.
- April 21 – John Muir (died 1914), Scottish-born American naturalist.
- May 6 – Alexandra Smirnoff (died 1913), Finnish pomologist.
- June 4 – John Grigg (died 1920), New Zealand astronomer.
- July 19 – Joel Asaph Allen (died 1921), American zoologist.
- August 6 – George James Symons (died 1900), English meteorologist.
- December 12 – Sherburne Wesley Burnham (died 1921), American astronomer.

== Deaths ==
- March 16 – Nathaniel Bowditch (born 1773), American mathematician.
- April 6 – José Bonifácio de Andrada (born 1763), Brazilian statesman and mineralogist.
- May 11 – Thomas Andrew Knight (born 1759), English horticulturalist.
- July 5 – Jean Marc Gaspard Itard (born 1774), French otorhinolaryngologist.
- August 21 – Adelbert von Chamisso (born 1781), German botanist.
- September 1 – William Clark (born 1770), American explorer.
- September 27 – Bernard Courtois (born 1777), French chemist.
- October 1 – Charles Tennant (born 1768), Scottish chemist and industrialist.
