= Ann Merchant Boesgaard =

Astronomer at the University of Hawaii

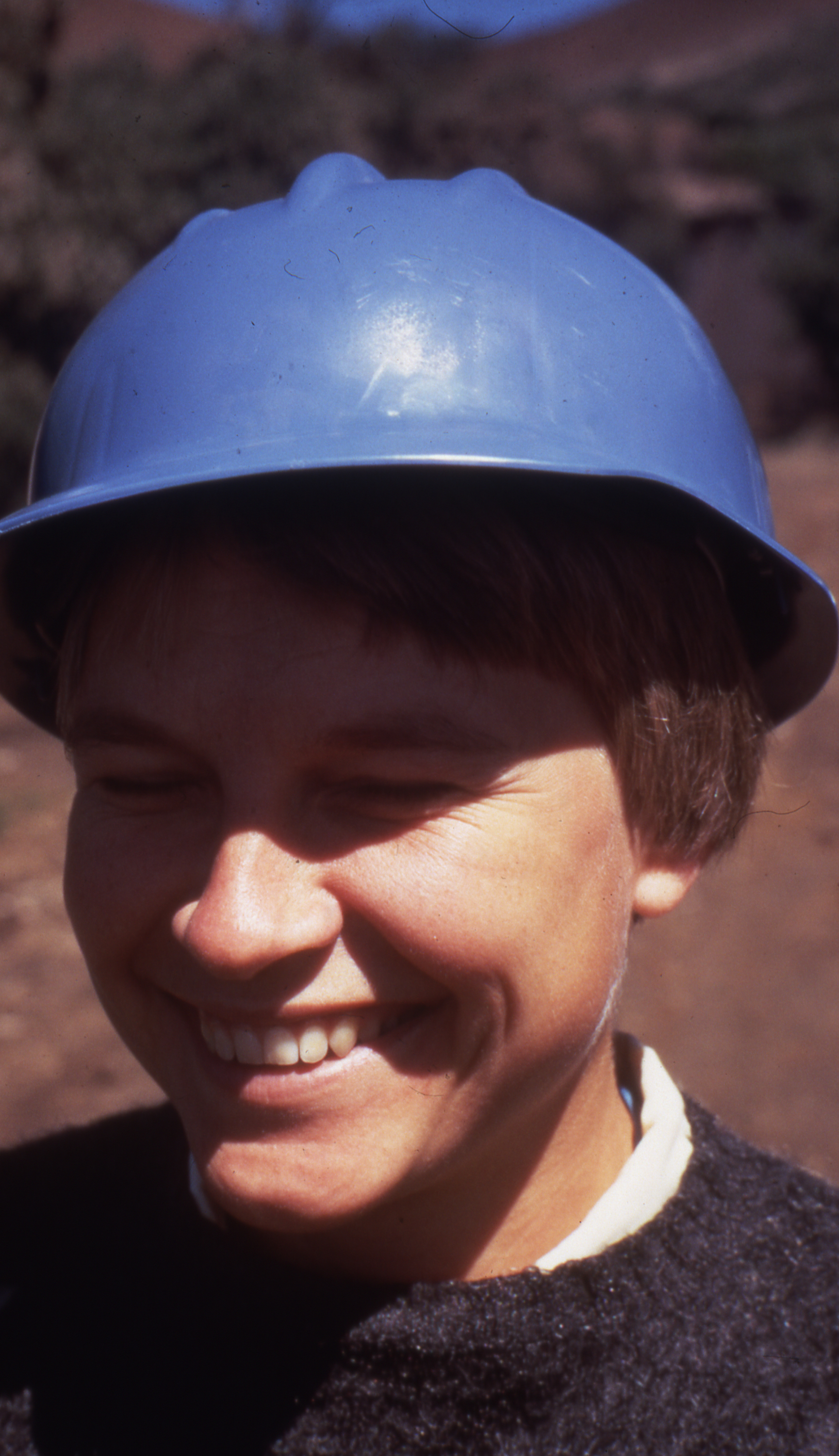
- Boesgaard in 1969
- Born: March 21, 1939 (age 87)
- Education: Mount Holyoke College University of California, Berkeley
- Known for: Stellar evolution, Astronomical spectroscopy, Nucleosynthesis
- Spouse: Hans Boesgaard (m. 1966)
- Awards: Henry Norris Russell Lectureship Guggenheim Fellowship Smithsonian Fellow Collège de France Medal Muhlmann Prize of the Astronomical Society of the Pacific American Astronomical Society Legacy Fellow
- Scientific career
- Fields: Astronomy
- Workplaces: University of Hawaiʻi at Mānoa
- Academic advisors: Robert F. Howard Jesse Greenfield George Herbig
- Website: http://www.ifa.hawaii.edu/~boes/

Ann Merchant Boesgaard (née Merchant; born March 21, 1939) is an American astronomer and professor emerita known for her work on the structure and evolution of stars. The minor planet 7804 Boesgaard was named after her in 1998, and in 2019, she received the American Astronomical Society's highest award, the Henry Norris Russell Lectureship.

== Early life ==
Ann Merchant grew up in Rochester, New York. After her father left when she was five, she and her sister, Carolyn, were raised by their mother, Elizabeth Barnes Merchant. To make ends meet, the family moved in with Ann's grandmother, Estelle Barnes Davis, and great-aunt, Aurelia Huntington. Elizabeth Merchant had studied mathematics at Vassar College for two years before she was married, which enabled her to get a job in the accounting department at Eastman Kodak after the divorce to support daughters Ann and Carolyn. She taught Ann the constellations from a young age, and Ann's first Girl Scouts badge was in astronomy. Ann wanted to be an astronaut, but her gender, poor eyesight, and lack of test pilot experience made that dream impossible.

== Education and Career ==
Boesgaard received her bachelor's degree magna cum laude in 1961 from Mount Holyoke College. She wrote her final thesis on solar rotation with Dr. Robert F. Howard from the University of Massachusetts. In the summer of 1961, she moved to California to work for Dr. Jesse Greenfield at CalTech before starting her PhD at the University of California, Berkeley, where she conducted her thesis research on lithium (Li) in red giants and supergiants with George Herbig. She graduated in 1966.

After graduating from UC Berkeley, Boesgaard applied for a post doctoral Carnegie Fellowship to work at the Mount Wilson and Palomar Observatories in Southern California, but she was denied. Instead, she returned to work with Dr. Greenfield at CalTech. In September 1966, she became the first woman to have a telescope assigned in her name at the Mount Wilson Observatory. The next year, in 1967, she moved to Hawai'i and became a professor of astronomy at the newly created Institute for Astronomy at the University of Hawaiʻi at Mānoa. She continued her own research while working with undergraduate and graduate researchers and the university.

Over the next several decades, Boesgaard broke gender barriers in her field and gained recognition and acclaim for her work. She was the first woman awarded a tenure-track faculty position in astronomy at the University of Hawai'i. In 1977, she became the first woman to be elected president of the Astronomical Society of the Pacific, a post she held until 1979. She concurrently served on the American Astronomical Society Council from 1978-1981. In 1998, the minor planet 7804 Boesgaard was named after her, as proposed by Dutch astronomers C.J. van Houten and Ingrid van Houten-Groeneveld.

Boesgaard retired from teaching in 2006, a couple of years after her husband, Hans Boesgaard, suffered a heart attack. She retired fully and became professor emerita in 2009, although she continues to use the Keck telescope for observation. In 2020, she was elected a Legacy Fellow of the American Astronomical Society.

== Research ==
Boesgaard's research focuses on the light element content - lithium, beryllium, and boron - of stars and the atmospheres of giant stars. She discovered that as galaxies age, the amount of heavy elements increases, thereby allowing astronomers to date stars based on their metal content. She has published more than 160 academic papers.

== Honors and awards ==
- NATO Senior Science Fellow (1973)
- College de France Medal (1980)
- Honorary Doctor of Science degree, Mount Holyoke College (1981)
- Guggenheim Fellow (1986)
- Muhlmann Prize of the Astronomical Society of the Pacific (1990)
- Henry Norris Russell Lectureship (2019)
- American Astronomical Society Legacy Fellow (2020)

== Personal life ==
Merchant met her husband, Hans Boesgaard, an engineer who works on telescopes, while working at the Lick Observatory in Mount Hamilton, California, with George Herbig. They married in 1966. At first, the two rarely lived in the same place due to their jobs, so they had to look for ways to see each other during overlapping projects. They eventually settled together in Hawai'i.
