= Akiva Vroman =

Israeli geologist

Akiva Jaap Vroman
- עקיבא פרומן
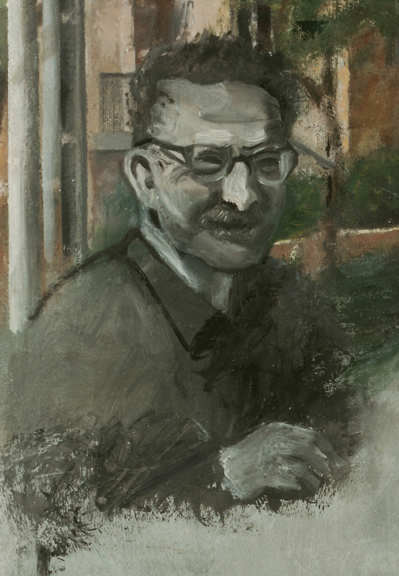
- Born: 21 May 1912; Gouda, Netherlands
- Died: 1989 (aged 76–77); Herzliya, Israel
- Occupation: Geologist
- Awards: Israel Prize (1955)
- Scientific career
- Education: Utrecht University
- Known for: Geological mapping of the Negev desert
- Fields: Geology
- Workplaces: Technion – Israel Institute of Technology

Akiva Jaap Vroman (Hebrew: עקיבא פרומן; 21 May 1912 in Gouda – 1989 in Herzliya) was an Israeli geologist.

== Biography ==
Vroman was born in the Netherlands, where he studied geology and theology at the Utrecht University. He immigrated to the then British Mandate of Palestine (now Israel) in 1940, having previously lived there in mid-1930s. In 1936, he pursued geological work in Zichron Ya'akov, studying the geological history of the Carmel Mountains. He married Gonny Betsy DeLeo, with whom he had three daughters, all born in Jerusalem.

== Scientific career ==
In 1939, he published his doctoral thesis, "Geology of the Region of Southwest Carmel (Palestine). in 1940, he was invited to work as a geologist in Palestine. He joined Hebrew University professor Leo Picard, head of the Department of Geology on Mount Scopus. In 1945-1948, he served as the field geologist of the Jordan Exploration Company, which was searching for oil in the region of Ein Gedi. He drew up maps of the region, including Masada and Sodom. During the 1948 Arab-Israeli War, Vroman worked for the Mapping and Photography Department of the Israel Defense Force. After the Siege of Jerusalem, he joined Yaacov Bendor on a mission to map the Negev desert in a search for oil, water and mineral deposits.

In 1950, Vroman moved to Haifa to teach at the Technion.

In 1964, Vroman studied aerial photography techniques in France.

== Awards and recognition ==
- In 1955, Vroman was awarded the Israel Prize, for the life sciences.

== See also ==
- List of Israel Prize recipients
