= Beethoven Burst (GRB 991216) =

Gamma-ray burst in constellation Orion

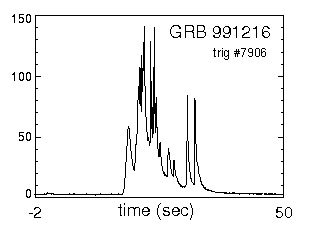
- Event type: Gamma-ray burst
- Constellation: Orion
- Redshift: 1.02
- Other designations: GRB 991216
- Related media on Commons

GRB 991216, nicknamed the Beethoven Burst by Dr. Brad Schaefer of Yale University, was a gamma-ray burst observed on December 16, 1999, coinciding with the 229th anniversary of Ludwig van Beethoven's presumed birth. A gamma-ray burst is a highly luminous flash associated with an explosion in a distant galaxy and producing gamma rays, the most energetic form of electromagnetic radiation, and often followed by a longer-lived "afterglow" emitted at longer wavelengths (X-ray, ultraviolet, optical, infrared, and radio).

== Overview ==
The optical afterglow of the burst reached an apparent magnitude of 18.7, making the Beethoven Burst one of the brightest bursts ever detected, even though it occurred about 10 billion light years from Earth. Frank Marshall, a NASA astrophysicist at the Goddard Space Flight Center, commented that "this was by far the brightest burst we have detected in a long time." The burst's peak flux ranked it as the second most powerful burst that the Burst and Transient Source Experiment (BATSE) had ever detected. The analysis of the observations strengthened the theory that gamma-ray bursts are a result of a hypernova, though other possible progenitors exist, such as the merger of two black holes.

Within four hours of the burst's detection, observations made by BATSE and the Rossi X-ray Timing Explorer were able to determine the burst's position of α = 77.38 ± 0.04, δ = 11.30 ± 0.05. This rapid determination allowed astronomers to conduct follow-up studies using optical and X-ray telescopes. Other instruments which detected GRB 991216 included the Chandra X-ray Observatory, the MDM Observatory, and the Space Telescope Imaging Spectrograph on board the Hubble Space Telescope. This was the first use of the Chandra X-ray Observatory for the purpose of gamma-ray burst detection.
