= V604 Aquilae =

Nova in the constellation Aquila

V604 Aquilae or Nova Aquilae 1905
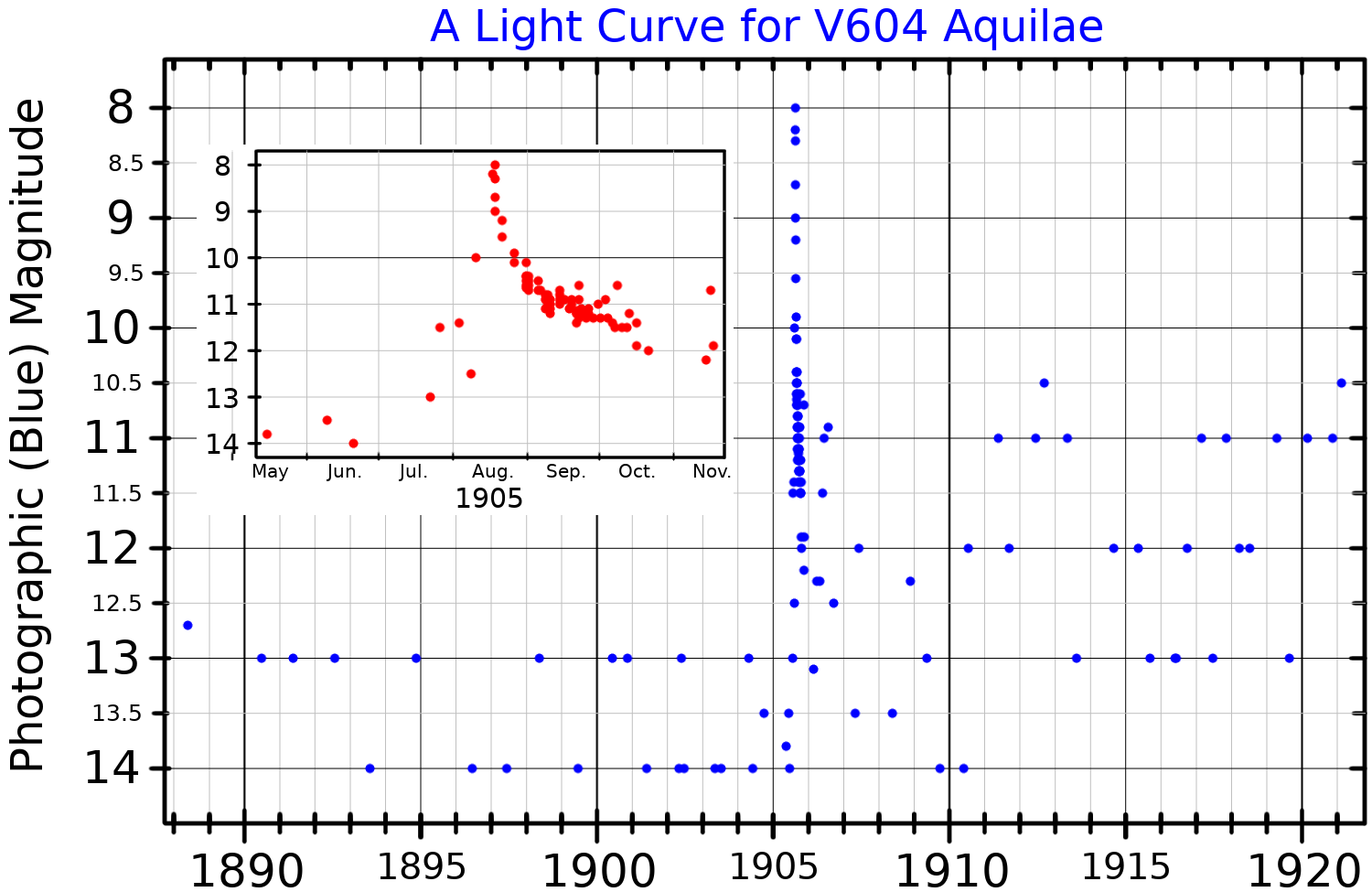
- A light curve for V604 Aquilae, plotted from data published by Walker (1933)

Observation data Epoch J2000 Equinox ICRS
- Constellation: Aquila
- Right ascension: 19^{h} 02^{m} 06.33^{s}
- Declination: −04° 26′ 43.2″
- Apparent magnitude (V): 7.6(blue) – 19.6(V)

Astrometry
Absolute magnitude (M_{V})	-8.3

Characteristics
- Spectral type: pec(Nova)
- B−V color index: 0.3
- Variable type: NA

Other designations
- Nova Aquilae 1905, CSI-04-18594, SV* HV 1175, AAVSO 1856-04, AN 104.1905, HD 176779.

Database references
SIMBAD	data

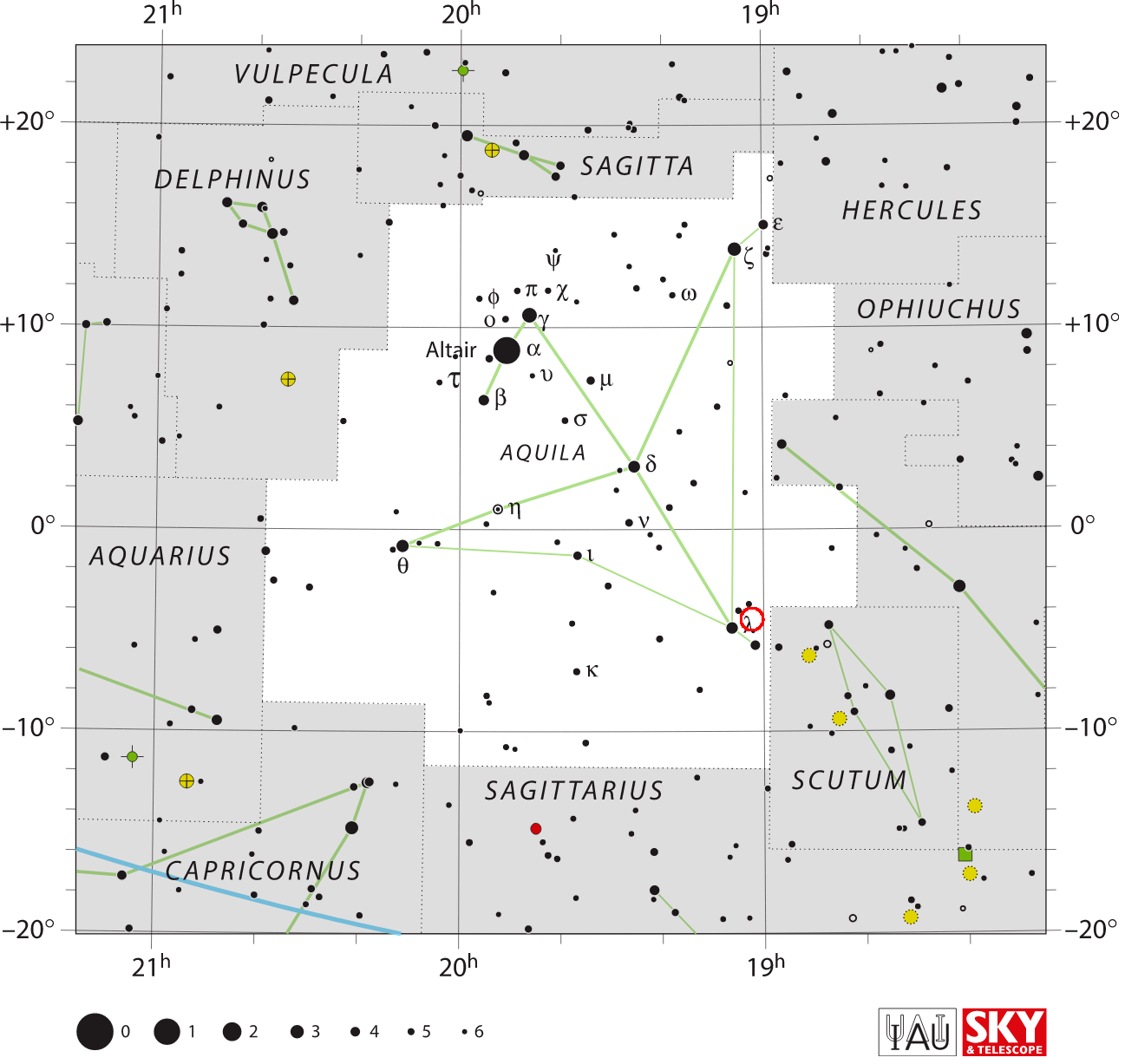
The location of V604 Aquilae (circled in red)

V604 Aquilae or Nova Aquilae 1905 is a nova which was first observed in the constellation Aquila in 1905 with a maximum brightness of magnitude 7.6. It was never bright enough to be seen with the naked eye. It was discovered by Williamina Fleming on a Harvard College Observatory photographic plate taken on August 31, 1905. Examination of plates taken earlier indicates that peak brightness occurred in mid-August 1905. The star's quiescent visual band brightness is 19.6.

V604 Aquilae faded by 3 magnitudes in just 25 days, making it a "fast nova". Detection of a faint nebula surrounding the star, with a radius of 0.4 arc minutes, was reported early in 1906. In 1994, a photometric study detected brightness variations of up to ~0.45 magnitudes on timescales of about one hour. An attempt to detect cool molecular gas surrounding the nova in 2015 was unsuccessful.
