= 1999 in science =

The year 1999 in science and technology involved some significant events.

== Aeronautics ==
- February 27 – While trying to circumnavigate the world in a hot air balloon, Colin Prescot and Andy Elson set a new endurance record after being in their balloon for 233 hours and 55 minutes.
- March 3–20 – Bertrand Piccard and Brian Jones successfully complete a non-stop circumnavigation of the world in a hot air balloon.

== Astronomy and space exploration ==
Total solar eclipse of August 11, viewed from France

- January 31 – A total penumbral lunar eclipse.
- February 7 – Stardust is launched on a mission to collect samples of a comet coma, and return them to Earth.
- February 11 – Pluto moves outside the orbit of Neptune, remaining there until 2231.
- February 16 – Annular solar eclipse, visible from Australia.
- July 20 – Mercury program: Liberty Bell 7 is raised from the Atlantic Ocean.
- July 28 – Partial lunar eclipse, visible from Australia, eastern Asia, and western North America.
- July 31 – NASA intentionally crashes the Lunar Prospector spacecraft into the Moon, thus ending its mission to detect frozen water on the Moon's surface.
- August 11 – Total solar eclipse, visible from Europe, across the Middle East, and ending in India.
- December 16 – The Beethoven Burst (GRB 991216) is one of the most powerful detected Gamma-ray bursts.
- NASA loses two Mars probes, the Mars Climate Orbiter and the Mars Polar Lander.
- The Subaru 8.3 m and Gemini North 8.1 m reflecting telescopes open at the Mauna Kea Observatory in Hawaii.
- The Cetus Dwarf galaxy is discovered.
- M–sigma relation first presented.

== Biology ==
- November 1 – Agreement on the Conservation of African-Eurasian Migratory Waterbirds comes into force.
- Late – Pest-exclusion fence around Zealandia (wildlife sanctuary) in Wellington, New Zealand, completed.
- The bacterium Thiomargarita namibiensis is discovered off the coast of Namibia. At 0.3mm in diameter, it is largest bacteria yet discovered.

== Chemistry ==
- Elements 118 and 116 are claimed to be made for the first time; later retracted when results cannot be replicated.

== Computer science ==
- March 26 – The Melissa worm attacks the Internet.
- June – RFC 2616 defines HTTP/1.1, the version of Hypertext Transfer Protocol in common use.
- September 21 – David Bowie's Hours becomes the first complete music album by a major artist available to download over the Internet in advance of the physical release.
- First working 3-qubit NMR computer demonstrated at IBM's Almaden Research Center. First execution of Grover's algorithm.
- The term 'Web 2.0' is coined by Darcy DiNucci.
- Probable date – First emojis introduced, in Japan.

== Geology ==
- January 25 – A 6.0 Richter scale earthquake hits western Colombia, killing at least 1,000.
- August 17 – The 7.6 M_{w} İzmit earthquake shakes northwestern Turkey with a maximum Mercalli intensity of IX (Violent), leaving 17,118–17,127 dead and 43,953–50,000 injured.

== History of science and technology ==
- Boris Chertok publishes «Ракеты и люди» (Rockets and people), a history of the Soviet rocket program.

== Mathematics ==
- Eric M. Rains and Neil Sloane extend tree counting.
- Thomas Callister Hales proves the honeycomb theorem.

== Paleontology ==
- First fossil of Kenyanthropus Pliocene hominin discovered in Lake Turkana, Kenya.

== Physics ==
- June 18 – Bulgaria becomes a member of CERN.
- October 25 – Randall–Sundrum model presented by Lisa Randall and Raman Sundrum.

== Physiology and medicine ==
- April 16 – Russell Foster and his team at Imperial College London publish their discovery of the non-rod, non-cone, intrinsically photosensitive retinal ganglion cells (ipRGCs) in the mammalian eye which provide input to the circadian rhythm system.
- October – Huda Zoghbi demonstrates that Rett syndrome is caused by mutations in the gene MECP2.

== Psychology ==
- The Dunning–Kruger effect, a cognitive bias, is first described by American psychologists David Dunning and Justin Kruger.

== Telecommunications ==
- January 19 – The first BlackBerry is released, using the same hardware as the Inter@ctive pager 950, and running on the Mobitex network.

== Awards ==
- Nobel Prizes
  - Physics – Gerardus 't Hooft, Martinus J.G. Veltman
  - Chemistry – Ahmed H. Zewail
  - Medicine – Günter Blobel
- Turing Award: Fred Brooks
- Wollaston Medal for Geology: John Frederick Dewey

== Deaths ==
- February 21 – Gertrude B. Elion (b. 1918), American pharmacologist, Nobel laureate in Physiology or Medicine.
- February 25 – Glenn T. Seaborg (b. 1912), American physical chemist, Nobel laureate in Chemistry.
- March 17 – Herbert E. Grier (b. 1911), American electrical engineer.
- April 28 – Arthur Leonard Schawlow (b. 1921), American physicist, Nobel laureate in Physics.
- May 8 – Edward Abraham (b. 1913), English biochemist.
- May 26 – Waldo Semon (b. 1898), American inventor.
- July 8 – Pete Conrad (b. 1930), American astronaut.
- November 11 – Vivian Fuchs (b. 1908), English geologist and explorer.
- November 25 – Pierre Bézier (b. 1910), French design engineer.
