= 1985 in science =

The year 1985 in science and technology involved many significant events, listed below.

== Astronomy and space exploration ==
- January 7 – Japan Aerospace Exploration Agency launches Sakigake, Japan's first interplanetary spacecraft and the first deep space probe to be launched by any country other than the United States or the Soviet Union.

== Chemistry ==
- The fullerene Buckminsterfullerene (C_{60}) is first intentionally prepared by Harold Kroto, James R. Heath, Sean O'Brien, Robert Curl and Richard Smalley at Rice University in the United States.

== Computer science ==
- March – The GNU Manifesto, written by Richard Stallman, is first published.
- March 15 – The first commercial Internet domain name, in the top-level domain .com, is registered in the name symbolics.com by Symbolics Inc., a computer systems firm in Cambridge, Massachusetts.
- November 20 – Microsoft Windows operating system released.

== Environment ==
- May 16 – Scientists of the British Antarctic Survey announce discovery of the ozone hole.

== Exploration ==
- September 1 – The wreck of the RMS Titanic (1912) in the North Atlantic is located by a joint American-French expedition led by Dr. Robert Ballard (WHOI) and Jean-Louis Michel (Ifremer) using side-scan sonar from RV Knorr.

== Mathematics ==
- March – Louis de Branges de Bourcia publishes proof of de Branges's theorem.
- September – Dennis Sullivan publishes proof of the No wandering domain theorem.
- December – Publication of the ATLAS of Finite Groups.
- Jean-Pierre Serre provides partial proof that a Frey curve cannot be modular, showing that a proof of the semistable case of the Taniyama-Shimura conjecture would imply Fermat's Last Theorem.
- Leonard Adleman, Roger Heath-Brown and Étienne Fouvry prove that the first case of Fermat's Last Theorem holds for infinitely many odd primes p.

== Paleontology ==
- December 9 – First known fossil (a vertebra) of a dinosaur to be found in Antarctica (by the British Antarctic Survey on James Ross Island), although it is not recognised (as from a Titanosaur) until 2026.

== Physics ==
- September – Physicist Carl Sagan's hard science fiction novel Contact is published in the United States, introducing the concept of a traversable wormhole devised by Kip Thorne.
- Portugal joins CERN.

== Physiology and medicine ==
- February 19 – Artificial heart patient William J. Schroeder becomes the first such patient to leave hospital.
- March 4 – The United States Food and Drug Administration approves a blood test for AIDS infection, used since this date for testing all U.S. blood donations.
- March–May – Joshua Silver develops an adjustable corrective lens.
- September 12 – German surgeon Erich Mühe performs the first laparoscopic cholecystectomy.
- October 17 – The British House of Lords decides the legal case of Gillick v West Norfolk and Wisbech Area Health Authority which sets the significant precedent of Gillick competence, i.e. that a child of 16 or under may be competent to consent to contraception or – by extension – other medical treatment without requiring parental permission or knowledge.
- Publication of a classified bibliography of 3500 reports on controlled trials in perinatal medicine published since 1940.
- DNA is first used in a criminal case.
- New York-based neurologist Oliver Sacks publishes The Man Who Mistook His Wife for a Hat and Other Clinical Tales.

== Technology ==
- January 1 – The first British mobile phone calls are made.
- February 20 – Minolta releases the Maxxum 7000, the world's first autofocus single-lens reflex camera.
- Atomic force microscope invented by Gerd Binnig, Calvin Quate and Christopher Berger.
- Akira Yoshino develops a practical lithium-ion battery.

== Awards ==
- Nobel Prizes
  - Physics – Klaus von Klitzing – for his discovery of the quantization of electrical resistance
  - Chemistry – Herbert A. Hauptman, Jerome Karle
  - Medicine – Michael S. Brown, Joseph L. Goldstein
- Turing Award – Richard Karp – for his work on computational complexity theory

== Births ==
- August 26 – Hugo Duminil-Copin, French mathematician.
- John M. Jumper, American computer scientist, winner of the Nobel Prize in Chemistry.

== Deaths ==
- March 10 – C. B. van Niel (b. 1897), Dutch American microbiologist.
- April 20 – Charles Richter (b. 1900), American geophysicist and inventor.
- July 20 – Bruno de Finetti (b. 1906), Italian statistician.
- August 5 – Arnold Wilkins (b. 1907), English pioneer of radar.
- August 31 – Frank Macfarlane Burnet (b. 1899), Australian virologist best known for his contributions to immunology, winner of the Nobel Prize in Physiology or Medicine.
- September 6 – Rodney Porter (b. 1917), English biochemist, winner of the Nobel Prize in Physiology or Medicine.
- September 7 – George Pólya (b. 1887), Hungarian mathematician.
- September 10 – Ernst Öpik (b. 1893), Estonian astronomer and astrophysicist.
- October 22 – Thomas Townsend Brown (b. 1905), American inventor.
- November 24 – László Bíró (b. 1899), Hungarian inventor.
- December 21 – Elliott Organick (b. 1925), American computer scientist and educator
- c. December 26 – Dian Fossey (b. 1932), American primatologist (murdered).
