= 1997 in science =

The year 1997 in science and technology involved many significant events, listed below.

== Astronomy and space exploration ==
- January 17 – Explosion of a Delta II rocket carrying a military GPS payload shortly after liftoff from Cape Canaveral.
- February 13 – Tune-up and repair work on the Hubble Space Telescope is started by astronauts from the Space Shuttle Discovery.
- February 27 – GRB 970228, a highly luminous flash of gamma rays, strikes the Earth for 80 seconds, providing early evidence that gamma-ray bursts occur well beyond the Milky Way.
- March 8 – Complete solar eclipse.
- March 24 – Partial lunar eclipse.
- July 4 – Mars Pathfinder lands on the surface of Mars.
- August 25 – Launch of Explorer 71 of the Explorer program of spacecraft.
- September 2 – Partial solar eclipse.
- September – Total lunar eclipse.
- October 15 – Launch of 10-year Cassini–Huygens spacecraft to Saturn.
- October 30 – First successful test flight of the ESA's Ariane 5 expendable launch system.

== Aviation ==
- September 7 – First test flight of the Lockheed Martin F-22 Raptor fifth-generation jet fighter.

== Biology ==
- February 22 – In Roslin, Scotland, scientists announce that an adult sheep named Dolly has been successfully cloned and was born in July 1996.
- March 4 – United States President Bill Clinton bars federal funding for any research on human cloning.
- March 14 – The widely cited 1973 John/Joan study of gender reassignment of a twin boy who lost his penis to a botched circumcision is exposed as fraudulent. The supposedly successful outcome for "Joan" reported by John Money had been cited as proof that gender was determined by nurture, yet the patient (later revealed as David Reimer) was in fact deeply unhappy and had returned to his original gender by the age of 15, thus indicating the exact opposite thesis.
- April 25 – Scientists announce that human artificial chromosomes have been created.
- July 10 – In London, scientists report their DNA analysis findings from a Neandertal skeleton which support the out of Africa theory of human evolution placing an "African Eve" at 100,000 to 200,000 years ago.
- August – Suzanne Simard and colleagues publish their discovery of carbon transfer between trees.
- November 6 – The discovery of klotho, a gene involved in human aging, is reported.
- November 19 – In Des Moines, Iowa, Bobbi McCaughey gives birth to septuplets in the second known case where all seven babies are born alive, and the first in which all survive infancy.

== Computer science ==
- February 7 – Steve Jobs returns to Apple Inc. as a consultant after the company purchases his software startup NeXT.
- May 11 – IBM's Deep Blue defeats Garry Kasparov, the first time a computer defeats a chess grand master in a match. Deep Blue has defeated Kasparov before, but has never previously won a match against him.
- September 15 – The domain name for the web search engine Google is registered.

== Earth sciences ==
- May 10 – The 7.3 M_{w} Qayen earthquake shakes eastern Iran with a maximum Mercalli intensity of X (Extreme). At least are 1,567 killed and 2,300 injured.

== Mathematics ==
- January 1 – The Duckworth–Lewis–Stern method is first applied in an international cricket match.
- Thomas Callister Hales verifies the proof of the fundamental lemma over the group Sp(4).

== Paleontology ==
- Megalosaurus and Cetiosaurus footprints are identified at Ardley, Oxfordshire, by Christopher Jackson.

== Physics ==
- May – High Resolution Fly's Eye Cosmic Ray Detector (HiRes) is built and operated on the Dugway Proving Grounds in the western Utah desert.
- November 27 – AdS/CFT correspondence proposed by Juan Martín Maldacena.

== Physiology and medicine ==
- March – Use of the B-Lynch suture in cases of severe postpartum bleeding is first described.
- Food and Drug Administration approval of daclizumab, the first humanized antibody therapeutic.
- Charles M. Rice demonstrates the effect of the hepatitis C virus.

== Technology ==
- October 15 – The first supersonic land speed record is set by the ThrustSSC team from the United Kingdom.

== Events ==
- November 23 – "Lisa the Skeptic" first broadcast as an episode of The Simpsons in the United States.

== Awards ==
- Nobel Prizes
  - Physics – Steven Chu, Claude Cohen-Tannoudji, William D. Phillips
  - Chemistry – Paul D. Boyer, John E. Walker, Jens Christian Skou
  - Medicine – Stanley B. Prusiner
- Turing Award – Douglas Engelbart
- Wollaston Medal for Geology – Douglas James Shearman

== Births ==
- January 8 – Jack Andraka, American researcher

== Deaths ==
- January 8 – Melvin Calvin (b. 1911), American chemist, winner of the Nobel Prize in Chemistry.
- January 12 – Jean Hoerni (b. 1924), Swiss-American microelectronics engineer, developer of the planar process.
- January 15 – Kenneth V. Thimann (b. 1904), English-American plant physiologist and microbiologist known for his studies of plant hormones.
- January 17 – Clyde Tombaugh (b. 1906), American astronomer, discoverer of Pluto.
- February 16 – Chien-Shiung Wu (b. 1912), Chinese-American nuclear physicist, winner of the Wolf Prize in Physics.
- March 4 – Robert H. Dicke (b. 1916), American physicist.
- March 7 – Edward Mills Purcell (b. 1912), American physicist, winner of the Nobel Prize in Physics.
- March 29 – Norman Pirie (b. 1907), British virologist.
- April 4 – Leo Picard (b. 1900), German-born Israeli geologist.
- April 7 – Georgi Shonin (b. 1935), Soviet cosmonaut.
- April 12 – George Wald (b. 1906), American physiologist, winner of the Nobel Prize in Physiology or Medicine.
- May 2 – Sir John Eccles (b. 1903), Australian neurophysiologist, winner of the Nobel Prize in Physiology or Medicine.
- June 25 – Jacques Cousteau (b. 1910), French oceanographer.
- July 4 – J. Z. Young (b. 1907), English zoologist and neurophysiologist.
- August 4 – Jeanne Calment (b. 1875), French supercentenarian, oldest person in confirmed history.
- August 23 – Sir John Kendrew (b. 1917), English molecular biologist, winner of the Nobel Prize in Chemistry.
- August 24 – Louis Essen (b. 1908), English physicist, co-developer of the first practical atomic clock.
- October 23 – Helen Wright Greuter (b. 1914), American historian of astronomy.
- September 2 – Viktor Frankl (b. 1905), Austrian psychotherapist.
- September 4 – Hans Eysenck (b. 1916), British psychologist.
- December 9 – Karl August Folkers (b. 1906), American biochemist.
- December 17 – R. V. Jones (b. 1911), English physicist, expert in electronic military defence.
- December 26 – Cahit Arf (b. 1910), Turkish mathematician.
