= 1981 in science =

The year 1981 in science and technology involved many significant events, listed below.

== Biology ==
- September – Pantanal Matogrossense National Park designated in Brazil.
- Publication of Stephen Jay Gould's critique of biological determinism, The Mismeasure of Man, in the United States.

== Chemistry ==
- A German research team led by Peter Armbruster and Gottfried Münzenberg at the GSI Helmholtz Centre for Heavy Ion Research (GSI Helmholtzzentrum für Schwerionenforschung) in Darmstadt bombard a target of bismuth-209 with accelerated nuclei of chromium-54 to produce 5 atoms of the isotope bohrium-262

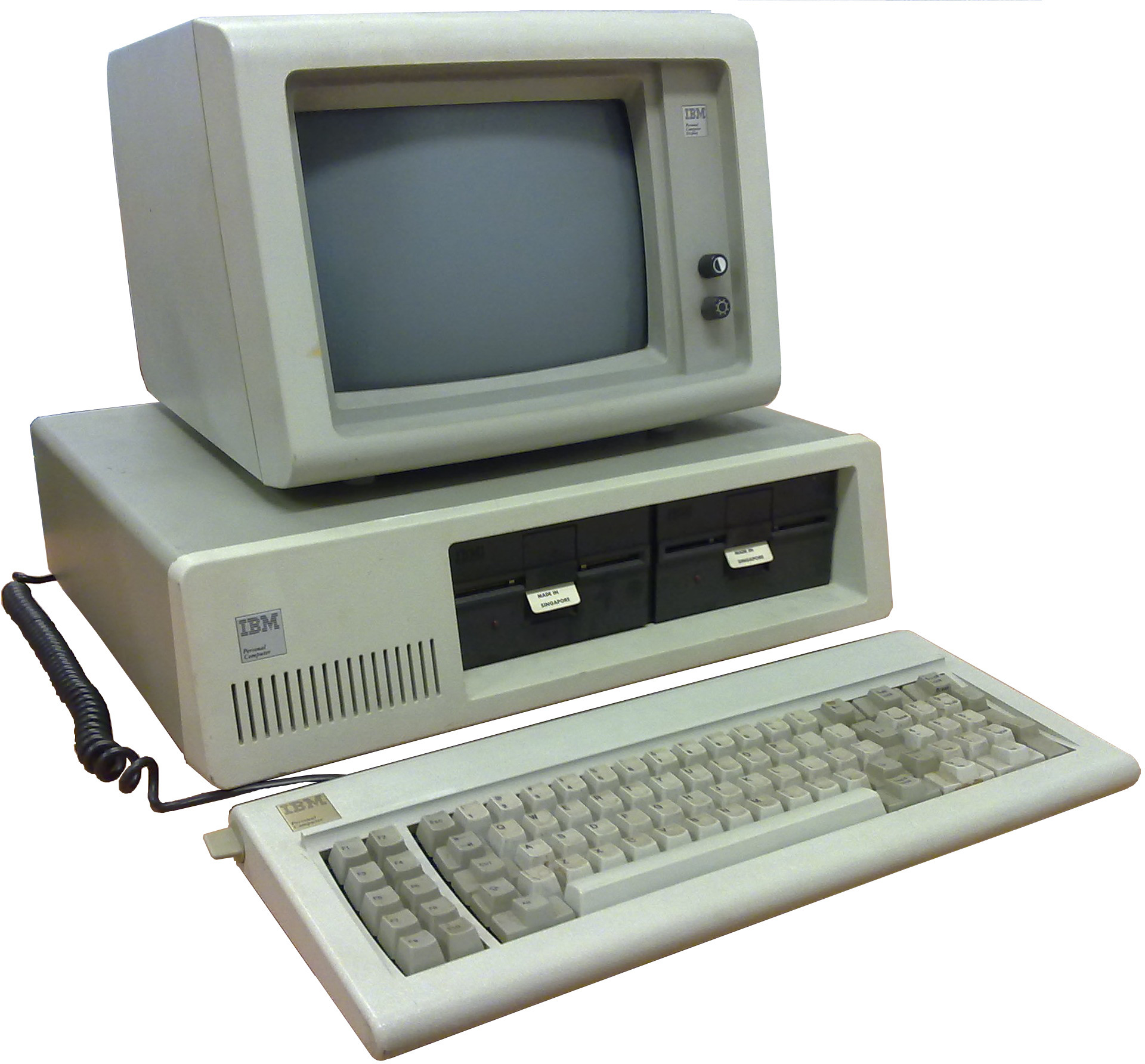
IBM PC 5150

== Computer science ==
- March 5 – The ZX81, a pioneering British home computer, is launched by Sinclair Research, going on to sell over 1.5 million units worldwide.
- April 3 – The Osborne 1, the first successful portable computer, is unveiled at the West Coast Computer Faire in San Francisco.
- July 9 – Nintendo releases the arcade game Donkey Kong featuring the debut of Mario.
- August 12 – The IBM Personal Computer is released.
- September 12 – The Chaos Computer Club, a European association of hackers, is established in Berlin by Wau Holland and others.

== Mathematics ==
- Alexander Merkurjev proves the norm residue isomorphism theorem for the case n = 2 and ℓ = 2.

== Medicine ==
- April 26 – Dr. Michael R. Harrison of the University of California, San Francisco, performs the world's first human open fetal surgery.
- June 5 – AIDS pandemic begins when the United States Centers for Disease Control and Prevention reports an unusual cluster of Pneumocystis pneumonia in five homosexual men in Los Angeles.
- Bruce Reitz leads the team that performs the first successful heart–lung transplant on Mary Gohlke at Stanford Hospital.
- LeCompte maneuver first performed.
- English psychiatrist Lorna Wing introduces the term "Asperger syndrome".

== Space exploration ==
- April 12 – The first launch of a Space Shuttle: Columbia launches on the STS-1 mission.
- October 6 – UoSAT-1, the first modern microsatellite, is launched into Low Earth orbit.

== Technology ==
- July 7 – Electric aircraft Solar Challenger, designed by an American team led by Paul MacCready and piloted by Stephen Ptacek, makes a 163-mile (262 km) crossing of the English Channel using only solar power from wing-mounted photovoltaic cells.
- July 17 – Hyatt Regency walkway collapse: Structural failure due to a late design change causes two internal suspended walkways at the Hyatt Regency Hotel in Kansas City, Missouri to collapse, killing 114.

== Awards ==
- Nobel Prizes
  - Physics – Nicolaas Bloembergen, Arthur Leonard Schawlow, Kai M. Siegbahn
  - Chemistry – Kenichi Fukui, Roald Hoffmann
  - Medicine – Roger W. Sperry, David H. Hubel, Torsten N. Wiesel
- Turing Award – Edgar F. Codd

== Deaths ==
- January 5
  - Frederick Osborn (b. 1889), American philanthropist and eugenicist.
  - Harold Urey (b. 1893), American winner of the Nobel Prize in Chemistry.
- February 26 – Jennie Smillie Robertson (b. 1878), Canadian gynecological surgeon.
- March 8 – Joseph Henry Woodger, British theoretical biologist (b. 1894)
- March 9 – Max Delbrück (b. 1906), German biologist.
- March 11 – Kazimierz Kordylewski (b. 1903), Polish astronomer.
- March 23 – Beatrice Tinsley (b. 1941), English astronomer.
- April 3 – Leo Kanner (b. 1894), Austrian American clinical child psychiatrist.
- May 11 – Odd Hassel, Norwegian chemist, Nobel Prize laureate (b. 1897)
- July 4 - Niels Erik Nørlund (b. 1885), Danish mathematician.
- July 27 – Elizabeth Rona (b. 1890), Hungarian American nuclear chemist.
- July 31 – Ernest Melville DuPorte (b. 1891), Black Canadian insect morphologist.
- September 8 – Hideki Yukawa, Japanese physicist, Nobel Prize laureate (b. 1907)
- September 9 – Jacques Lacan (b. 1901), French psychoanalyst.
- November 15 – Walter Heitler (b. 1904), German physicist
  Fellow of the Royal Society
- November 17
  - Wilhelm Pelikan (b. 1893), Austrian chemist.
  - Sibyl M. Rock (b. 1909), American mathematician.
- November 22 – Hans Krebs (b. 1900), German medical doctor and biochemist; discoverer of the citric acid cycle.
- December 6 – Harry Harlow (b. 1905), American psychologist.
