= 1984 in science =

The year 1984 in science and technology involved some significant events.

== Astronomy and space exploration ==
- February 7 – Astronauts Bruce McCandless II and Robert L. Stewart make the first untethered space walk.
- The National Radio Astronomy Observatory in the United States converts the 36-foot radio telescope on Kitt Peak (originally built in 1967) to the ARO 12m Radio Telescope.

== Biology ==
- First known case of Bovine spongiform encephalopathy, in England.
- The enzyme telomerase is discovered by Carol W. Greider and Elizabeth Blackburn in the ciliate Tetrahymena.
- Danish physiologist Steen Willadsen first successfully uses cells from early embryos to clone a mammal (sheep) by nuclear transfer at the British Agricultural Research Council's Institute of Animal Physiology, Cambridge.

== Chemistry and physics ==
- Peter Kramer and Dan Shechtman publish their discoveries of what will soon afterwards be named quasicrystals.
- Hiroshi Kobayashi and colleagues announce synthesis of tetrakis(3,5-bis(trifluoromethyl)phenyl)borate ("BARF").

== Computer science ==
- January 24 – Apple Computer places the Macintosh personal computer on sale in the United States. It will be the first successful PC to use a graphical user interface.
- The first edition of language documentation Common Lisp the Language (known as CLtL1) is published in the United States.

== History of science ==
- Robert Gwyn Macfarlane publishes Alexander Fleming: The Man and the Myth.

== Paleontology ==
- The fossil skeleton of the hominid "Turkana Boy" is discovered in Kenya.

== Physiology and medicine ==
- January – Seasonal affective disorder is formally described and named by Norman E. Rosenthal MD and colleagues in the United States as a mood disorder.
- February 3 – Dr John Buster and the research team at Harbor-UCLA Medical Center announce history's first embryo transfer from one woman to another resulting in a live birth.
- April 22 – Dr Robert Gallo and Margaret Heckler of United States Public Health Service announce the discovery of HTLV-III as the virus that causes AIDS.
- May 10 – Barbara H. Bowman and Oliver Smithies show that variations in haptoglobins are due to genetic polymorphisms.

== Technology ==
- May 5 – Itaipu Dam in South America begins to generate hydroelectricity.
- July 21 – In Jackson, Michigan, a factory robot crushes a worker against a safety bar in apparently the first robot-related death in the United States.

== Awards ==
- Nobel Prizes
  - Physics – Carlo Rubbia, Simon van der Meer
  - Chemistry – Robert Bruce Merrifield
  - Medicine – Niels K. Jerne, Georges J. F. Köhler, César Milstein
- Turing Award – Niklaus Wirth

== Births ==
- May 14 – Mark Zuckerberg, American computer programmer and entrepreneur, co-founder of social media platform Facebook.
- December 2 – Maryna Viazovska, Ukrainian-born mathematician.

== Deaths ==
- January 8 – Eerik Kumari (b. 1912), Estonian ornithologist and academic.
- February 21 – Anna Baetjer (b. 1899), American toxicologist.
- April 8 – Pyotr Kapitsa (b. 1894), Russian physicist, Nobel Prize laureate.
- April 15 – Grete Hermann (b. 1901), German mathematician and philosopher.
- May 13 – Stanislaw Ulam (b. 1909), Polish American mathematician.
- May 24 – Sir Stanley Hooker (b. 1907), English aeronautical engineer.
- August 6 – Abraham Lilienfeld (b. 1920), American epidemiologist.
- August 11 – George Streisinger (b. 1927), Hungarian American molecular biologist, the first person to clone a vertebrate.
- October 20 – Paul Dirac (b. 1902), English-born physicist.
- November 20 – Charles C. Conley (b. 1933), American mathematician working on dynamical systems.
- December 20 – Stanley Milgram (b. 1933), American social psychologist.
