= 1993 in science =

The year 1993 in science and technology involved many significant events, listed below.

== Astronomy and space exploration ==
- February 13 – Asteroid 7253 Nara is discovered by Fumiaki Uto.
- December 2 – STS-61 is launched. This Space Shuttle mission to the Hubble Space Telescope (HST) installs corrective optics, plus upgrades, that not only allow the telescope to focus properly, but also increase magnification/clarity beyond the original design. HST had been pre-designed for such continuous improvement.
- The first definite asteroid moon is confirmed when the Galileo probe discovers Dactyl orbiting 243 Ida.

== Computer science ==
- March 22 – The Intel Corporation ships the first Pentium chips
- March 31 – A bug in a program written by Richard Depew sends an article to 200 newsgroups simultaneously. The term spamming is coined by Joel Furr to describe the incident.
- April – Release of the Sibelius music notation program, developed by British twins Ben and Jonathan Finn.
- April 22 – Release of version 1.0 of the Mosaic Web browser, devised by Marc Andreessen and Eric Bina in the United States.
- June 9 – Release of Jurassic Park making pioneering use of computer-generated imagery to produce moving images of prehistoric creatures.
- June 15 – Adobe publishes the first version of the PDF format together with version 1.0 of its PDF product line Adobe Acrobat

== Mathematics ==
- April – Publication of a seminal paper on the particle filter.
- June 21 – Andrew Wiles announces a proof of Fermat's Last Theorem at the Isaac Newton Institute. The proof is slightly flawed, but Wiles announces a revised proof the following year.

== Paleontology ==
- 14-year-old fossil hunter Wes Linster finds the first Bambiraptor skeleton in Montana.
- Giant sauropod dinosaur Argentinosaurus formally described by José Bonaparte and Rodolfo Coria.

== Physics ==
- Leon M. Lederman and Dick Teresi publish The God Particle.

== Physiology and medicine ==
- February – The New England Journal of Medicine publishes findings demonstrating that patients with peptic ulcers can be successfully treated with antibiotics, lending strong support to the discovery that peptic ulcer disease is caused by H. pylori.
- March 23 – Start of Milwaukee Cryptosporidiosis outbreak.
- July 15 – A study published by Dean Hamer and others in the United States indicates a link between the chromosome band and genetic marker Xq28 and male sexual orientation.
- August
  - Formal launch of the Cochrane Collaboration.
  - Francisco Mojica first characterizes what becomes known as the CRISPR locus.
- The "Intelligent Prosthesis", the first commercially available microprocessor-controlled prosthetic knee, is released by UK company Charles A. Blatchford & Sons.

== Awards ==
- Nobel Prizes
  - Physics – Russell A. Hulse, Joseph H. Taylor Jr.
  - Chemistry – Kary Mullis, Michael Smith
  - Medicine – Richard J. Roberts, Phillip A. Sharp
- Turing Award – Juris Hartmanis, Richard E. Stearns
- Wollaston Medal for Geology – Samuel Epstein

== Deaths ==
- January 9 – Dame Janet Vaughan, English physiologist (b. 1899)
- January 28 – Helen Sawyer Hogg, Canadian astronomer (b. 1905)
- February 11 – Robert W. Holley, American biochemist, winner of the Nobel Prize in Physiology or Medicine (b. 1922)
- February 21 – Inge Lehmann, Danish seismologist (b. 1888)
- March 4 – Izaak Kolthoff, Dutch 'father of analytical chemistry' (b. 1894)
- April 1 – Solly Zuckerman, British government scientific advisor (b. 1904)
- July 2
  - Elizabeth M. Ramsey, American research physician (b. 1906)
  - Clarence Zener, American physicist (b. 1905)
- July 24 – Anna Maurizio, Swiss biologist (b. 1900)
- August 16 – Kitty Joyner, American electrical engineer (b. 1916)
- August 25 – Mildred Creak, English child psychologist (b. 1898)
- September 24 – Bruno Pontecorvo, Italian-born Soviet nuclear physicist (b. 1913)
- October 1 – Vera Peters, Canadian oncologist (b. 1911)
- October 17 – Zvi Sliternik, Israeli entomologist (b. 1897)
- November 1 – Severo Ochoa, Spanish biochemist, winner of the Nobel Prize in Physiology or Medicine (b. 1905)

== Organisations ==
- Czech Republic and Slovakia join CERN.
