= Elizabeth M. Ramsey =

American physician, placentologist, and embryologist

- Born: February 17, 1906; New York City
- Died: July 2, 1993 (aged 87)

Elizabeth Mapelsden Ramsey, M.D. (17 February 1906 – 2 July 1993) was an American physician, placentologist, and embryologist known for pioneering the study of early human embryos and the structure and circulatory system of the placenta. She was a researcher at the Carnegie Institution of Washington for nearly forty years. While performing an autopsy in 1934, she discovered a 14-day-old human embryo, the earliest yet studied at the time. Later in her career, Dr. Ramsey worked on a team that used cineradiography to reveal the workings of the placental circulatory system in primates.

Ramsey published over 125 articles and three books.

== Early life and education ==
Ramsey was born in New York City in 1906 and grew up in California. She attended Mills College, an all-women's university in Oakland, California. Following graduation, she studied for a year at the University of Hamburg, then returned to the United States to attend the Yale School of Medicine. She graduated with her M.D. in 1932, one of only two women in her class.

== The "Yale Embryo" and the Carnegie Institution in Washington ==
After graduation, Ramsey began a residency at Yale in pathology. During her first human autopsy, she discovered the previously unknown presence of a very early embryo. Later determined to be approximately 14 days old, it was one of the earliest embryos collected for study at the time. Indeed, one of Ramsey's colleagues doubted that it even was an embryo, instead believing the find was some kind of insect.

At the time, the Carnegie Institution in Washington had established a collection of embryos for the study of embryonic development and morphology. Ramsey brought this new embryo to the Carnegie collection, and soon joined the research staff there. She eventually spent nearly all of her career, from 1932 to her retirement in 1971, at the Institute — save for time during World War II, when she served as Assistant Chief of the Office of Medical Information of the National Research Council.

== Placentology ==
Ramsey's career included several landmark studies of structure and development of the placenta and its circulatory system. These studies involved a number of advances to use cineradiography to observe how blood moved through the placenta. In addition to advances in imaging technology, Dr. Ramsey's teams pioneered exacting injection techniques and established the use of primate models to study human placental function.

Ramsey, with Martin Donner, assembled a body of work that illuminated many key features of placental circulation. They showed that maternal blood entered and left the placenta through the same structure. Unlike rodent models studied previously, they found that primate and human placentas did not rely on the blood of the mother and the fetus flowing in opposite directions to induce gas exchange; instead maternal blood enters the placenta in "spurts" that facilitate the exchange. Dr. Ramsey's work also revealed how trophoblastic cells spread along the inner wall of the placental arteries, in a frequently cited image, "like wax dripping down a candle."

Ramsey's work had significant implications for understanding the development of the placenta and problems with placental development, including placental abruption.

== Works ==
The Placenta of Laboratory Animals and Man, New York, Holt, Rinehart and Winston, 1975. ISBN 0-03-086121-7

Placental Vasculature and Circulation: Anatomy, Physiology, Radiology, Clinical Aspects — Atlas and Textbook, with Martin W. Donner. Philadelphia, Saunders, 1980. ISBN 9780721674469

The Placenta : Human and Animal, New York, N.Y., Praeger, 1982. ISBN 9780275913786

== Awards and appointments ==
Elizabeth Ramsey received the following awards and appointments:

- American College of Obstetricians and Gynecologists, Distinguished Service Award
- American College of Obstetricians and Gynecologists, Hall of Fame
- Society for Gynecological Investigation, Distinguished Scientist Award
- American Gynecological and Obstetrical Society, Honorary Fellow
- Yale Medical School, Dean's Council
- National Symphony Orchestra, Board of Trustees
- National Cathedral Choral Society, Board Member
