= 1990 in science =

The year 1990 in science and technology involved some significant events.

== Astronomy and space exploration ==
- January 24 – Japan launches the Hiten spacecraft, the first lunar probe launched by a country other than the Soviet Union or the United States.
- February 14 – The Pale Blue Dot photograph of Earth is sent back from the Voyager 1 probe after completing its primary mission, from around 3.5 billion miles away.
- April 24 – The Space Shuttle Discovery places the Hubble Space Telescope into orbit.
- August 16 – Steven Balbus makes his first discovery leading to elucidation of magnetorotational instability.
- October 13 – Earth-grazing meteoroid of 13 October 1990: A 44 kilogram, 41.5 km/s meteoroid passes above Czechoslovakia and Poland at 97.9 km. It is the first time calculations of the orbit of such a body based on photographic records from two distant places is made.

== Biology ==
- The term "rewilding" is first used in print.

== Computer science ==
- February – Adobe Photoshop 1.0 graphics software, devised by Thomas Knoll, is released.
- May 22 - Windows 3.0 is shipped by Microsoft
- November 12 – Tim Berners-Lee publishes a more formal proposal for the World Wide Web.
- November 13 – The first known web page is written.
- Approx. November 22 – Satoshi Tajiri begins creating the first Pokémon game.

== History of science ==
- Thomas W. Laqueur publishes Making Sex: Body and Gender From the Greeks to Freud (Harvard University Press).

== Mathematics ==
- Alan E. Gelfand and Adrian Smith publish a paper drawing attention to the significance of the Gibbs sampler technique for Bayesian numerical integration problems.
- Victor Kolyvagin introduces Euler systems.
- Ruth Lawrence publishes a paper on homological representations of the Hecke algebra, introducing, among other things, certain novel linear representations of the braid group, the Lawrence–Krammer representation.

== Paleontology ==
- August 12 – "Sue", the best preserved Tyrannosaurus rex specimen ever found, is discovered in South Dakota by Sue Hendrickson.

== Physiology and medicine ==
- June 25 – Cruzan v. Director, Missouri Department of Health decided in the Supreme Court of the United States allowing public officials to intervene in questions of termination of life support in the absence of an advance healthcare directive.
- The Human Genome Project is founded.
- The first evidence for the existence of the BRCA gene encoding for a DNA repair enzyme involved in breast cancer susceptibility Is provided by Mary-Claire King's laboratory at University of California, Berkeley.
- The inherited mutations of the tumor suppressor gene, p53, are identified as the underlying mechanism for Li–Fraumeni syndrome in most affected families.

== Psychology ==
- Roger Shepard's Mind Sights presents the "Shepard tables" illusion.

== Awards ==
- Fields Prize in Mathematics: Vladimir Drinfeld, Vaughan Frederick Randal Jones, Shigefumi Mori and Edward Witten
- Nobel Prizes
  - Physics – Jerome Isaac Friedman, Henry Way Kendall and Richard E. Taylor
  - Chemistry – Elias James Corey
  - Medicine – Joseph E. Murray and E. Donnall Thomas
- Turing Award – Fernando J. Corbató

== Births ==
- September 28 – Nadim Kobeissi, Lebanese computer science researcher

== Deaths ==
- January 4 – Doc Edgerton, (b. 1903), American electrical engineer.
- January 14 – Rosalind Pitt-Rivers (b. 1907), English biochemist.
- January 26 – Lewis Mumford (b. 1895), American historian and philosopher of science.
- February 19 – Edris Rice-Wray Carson (b. 1904), American-born physician, pioneer in family planning.
- March 20 – Victor Rothschild, 3rd Baron Rothschild (b. 1910), English polymath.
- March 22 – Gerald Bull (b. 1928), Canadian engineer.
- March 24 – An Wang (b. 1920), Chinese American computer designer.
- May 1 – Frits Warmolt Went (b. 1903), Dutch-born American botanist.
- May 30 – Ora Mendelsohn Rosen (b. 1935), American biomedical researcher.
- August 2 – François Perrier (b. 1922), French psychoanalyst.
- August 18 – B. F. Skinner (b. 1904), American behavioral psychologist.
- August 30 – Bernard D. H. Tellegen (b. 1900), Dutch electrical engineer.
- September 2 – John Bowlby (b. 1907), English child psychologist and pioneer of attachment theory.
- October 9 – Murray Bowen (b. 1913), American psychiatrist and pioneer of family therapy.
- October 17 – Hans Freudenthal (b. 1905), Dutch mathematician.
- November 19 – Georgy Flyorov (b. 1913), Russian physicist.
- November 25 – Bettina Warburg (b. 1900), German-born American psychiatrist.
