= Leo Picard =

Israeli geologist (1900–1997)

- ליאו פיקרד
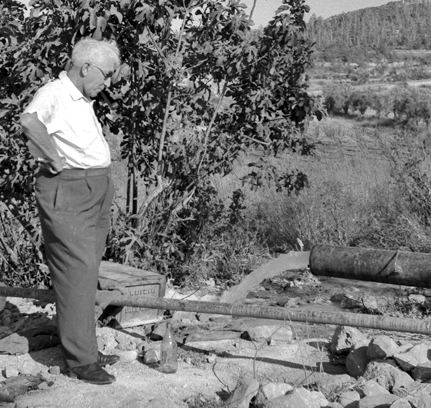
- Born: 3 June 1900; Germany
- Died: 4 April 1997 (aged 96); Israel
- Education: University of Freiburg; Humboldt University of Berlin; University of Paris; University of London
- Known for: Founding the Department of Geology at the Hebrew University of Jerusalem
- Awards: Israel Prize (1958); Yakir Yerushalayim (1981)
- Scientific career
- Fields: Geology, Hydrogeology
- Workplaces: Hebrew University of Jerusalem

Leo Picard (Hebrew: יהודה ליאו פיקרד; 3 June 1900 – 4 April 1997), was an Israeli geologist and an expert in the field of hydrogeology.

== Biography ==
Yehuda Leo Picard was born in Germany in 1900, and studied at universities in Freiburg and Berlin, in Germany, and in Paris and London, and taught at the University of Florence, Italy.

Picard visited Mandate Palestine in 1922 and emigrated there in 1924, where he established the Department of Geology at the Hebrew University of Jerusalem. In 1943, he published his book "Structure and Evolution of Palestine", which became a primary book for the study of geology in Israel.

Leo Picard was an expert hydrogeologist and an outstanding general geologist. He wrote about paleontology and stratigraphy, structural geology and tectonics, mineralogy and ore deposits. Well-known is his contribution to the debate on the tectonics of the Dead Sea Rift. Picard was doubtful whether left-lateral offset of some 100 km took place along the Rift, and suggested instead that the rift was developed and constrained by extension.

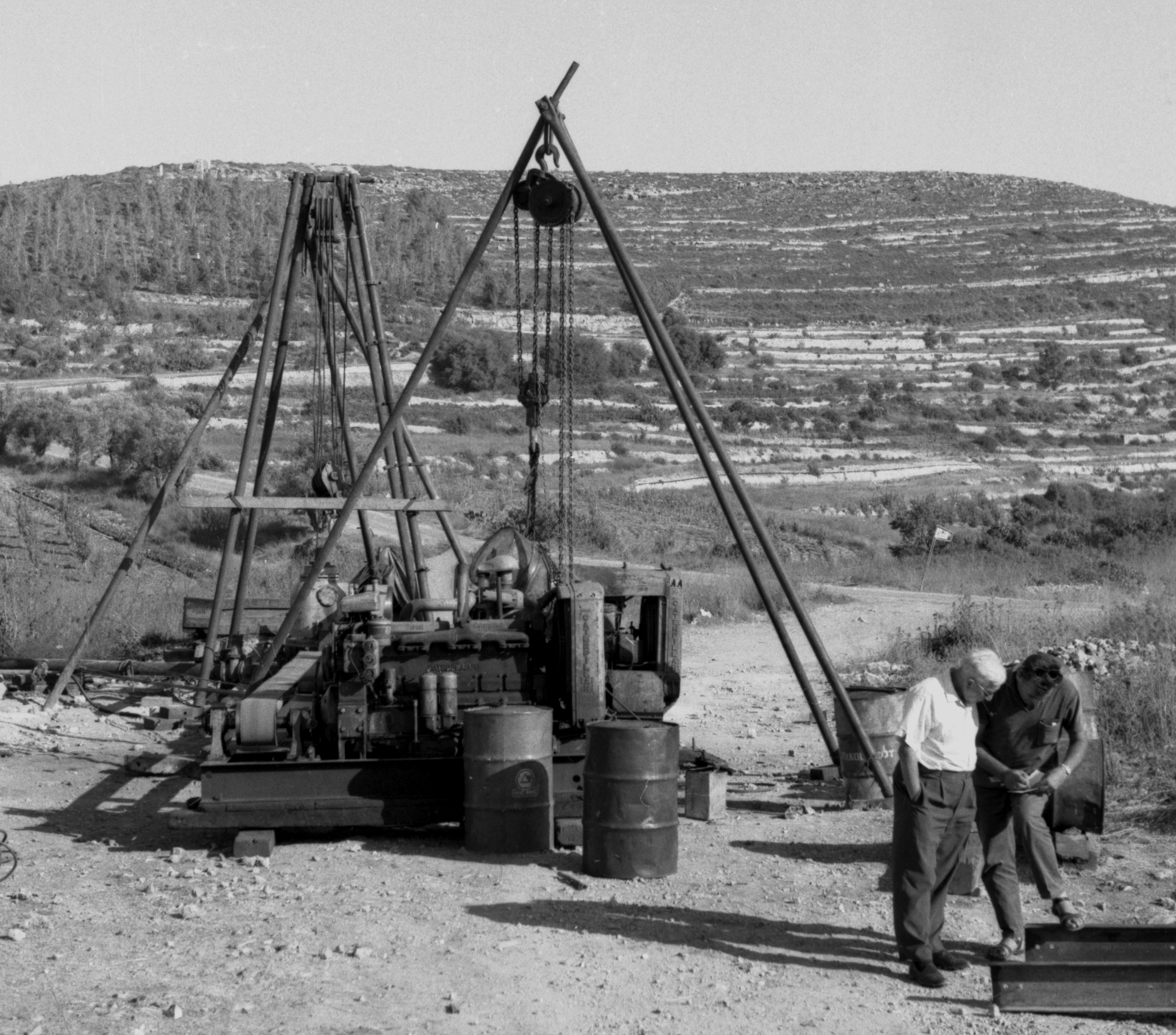
Picard inspects new water drill at Ein Hemed, 1964

In 1955, he was appointed president of the UNESCO committee of experts for arid areas. Following such appointment, he became an international consultant, and his investigations have assisted the development of many countries in Africa and Latin America.

He died in 1997 in Kibbutz Ginegar in northern Israel.

== Awards and recognition ==
- From 1951 to 1953, Picard served as the first president of the Israel Geological Society.
- In 1958, he was awarded the Israel Prize, in life sciences.
- In 1981, he received the award of Yakir Yerushalayim (Worthy Citizen of Jerusalem) from the city of Jerusalem.
- A street has been named after him in the Har Homa neighbourhood of Jerusalem.
- The Leo Picard Groundwater Research Center at the Rehovot campus of the Hebrew University of Jerusalem, is named after him.

== Works in English, French and German ==
- 1923, Die fraenkische Alb von Weissenburg i. B. und Umgebung
- 1928, Ein Eocaenprofil des Gilboas in Palaestina
- 1928, Zur Geologie der Kischon-Ebene
- 1929, Zur Geologie der Besan-Ebene
- 1930, Upper Cretaceous (chiefly Campanian and Maestrichtian) Gasteropoda and Pelecypoda from Palestine
- 1931, Geological researches in the Judean desert : with geological map and illustrations
- 1932, Zur geologie des mittleren Jordantales :(zwischen Wadi El-Oeschsche und Tiberiassee)
- 1933, Zur postmiocänen Entwicklungsgeschichte der Kontinentalbecken Nord-Palästinas
- 1936, Conditions of underground water in the Western Emek (plain of Esdraelon)
- 1936, On the geology of the Gaza-Beersheba district
- 1937, On the structure of the Arabian Peninsula
- 1937, On the geology of the central coastal plain : with a geological sketch map and 7 figures in the text
- 1938, The geology of New Jerusalem
- 1939, Outline on the tectonics of the earth :with special emphasis upon Africa
- 1940, Groundwater in Palestine
- 1943, Structure and evolution of Palestine, with comparative notes on neighbouring countries
- 1952, Geomorphogenic regions of the Negev, 1:250,000
- 1952, Geomorphogeny of Israel
- 1954, The structural pattern of Palestine, Israel and Jordan
- 1962, Rapport d’une mission d’etude geologique au Dahomey
- 1963, The quaternary in the Northern Jordan Valley
- 1964, Geological map, Israel
- 1965, The geological evolution of the quaternary in the central-northern Jordan Graben, Israel
- 1966, Vom Bodensee nach Erez Israel : Pionierarbeit fur Geologie und Grundwasser seit 1924
- 1966, Stratigraphic position of the Ubeidiya formation
- 1966, Geological report on the lower Pleistocene deposits of the Ubeidiya excavations
- 1968, On the structure of the Rhinegraben with comparative notes on Levantgraben feature
- 1973, General aspects of Israel’s oil search
- 1974, The Triassic
- 1987, The Jurassic stratigraphy in Israel and the adjacent countries

== See also ==
- List of Israel Prize recipients
