= 1979 in science =

The year 1979 in science and technology involved some significant events, listed below.

== Astronomy and space exploration ==
- February 7 – Pluto enters a 20-year period inside the orbit of Neptune for the first time in 230 years.
- March 7 – The largest magnetar (soft gamma repeater) event is recorded.
- July 11 – America's first space station, Skylab, is deliberately allowed to burn up on atmospheric entry over the Indian Ocean due to its decaying orbit and the lack of time to build a new spaceship to boost it up.
- September 1 – The American Pioneer 11 becomes the first spacecraft to visit Saturn when it passes the planet at a distance of 21,000 km.
- December 24 – The maiden launch of Ariane 1, the first rocket in the Ariane launcher family.
- Amateur Achievement Award of the Astronomical Society of the Pacific given for the first time.

== Biology ==
- Arthur William Baden Powell publishes New Zealand Mollusca.
- The Australian night parrot is sighted for the first time since 1912.

== Computer science ==
- May 8 - Radio Shack releases TRSDOS 2.3
- VisiCalc becomes the first spreadsheet program.
- The US Federal Government releases the initial, draft version of Ada (programming language), a strongly typed, comb-structured language with exception handlers, for embedded systems.

== Conservation ==
- April 5 – First stage of Kakadu National Park declared in Australia.

== Earth sciences ==
- The RISE project first discovers hydrothermal vents known as 'black smokers', on a mid-ocean ridge in the Pacific Ocean.

== History of science ==
- Robert Gwyn Macfarlane publishes Howard Florey: The Making of a Great Scientist.

== Mathematics ==
- 'Monstrous moonshine': John Conway and Simon P. Norton prove there is a connection between the Monster group M and the j-function in number theory.
- The first modern Sudoku, known as Number Place, appears in Dell Pencil Puzzles and Word Games (United States), devised by Howard Garns.

== Medicine ==
- August – The eating disorder Bulimia nervosa is first described and named by British psychiatrist Gerald Russell.
- December 9 – The World Health Organization certifies the global eradication of smallpox.
- The last naturally occurring cases of polio are reported in the United States.
- Tumor protein p53 is identified by Lionel Crawford, David Lane, Arnold J. Levine and Lloyd J. Old.

== Paleontology ==
- Dinosaur eggs found in the Two Medicine Formation of Montana.

== Technology ==
- March 1 – Philips publicly demonstrate a prototype of an optical digital audio disc at a press conference in Eindhoven, Netherlands.
- June 12 – Human-powered aircraft Gossamer Albatross, built by an American team led by Paul MacCready and piloted by Bryan Allen, makes a successful crossing of the English Channel to win the second Kremer prize.
- First sale of Post-It Notes in Boise, Idaho.

== Awards ==
- Nobel Prizes
  - Physics – Sheldon Glashow, Abdus Salam, Steven Weinberg
  - Chemistry – Herbert C. Brown, Georg Wittig
  - Medicine – Allan M. Cormack, Godfrey N. Hounsfield
- Turing Award – Kenneth E. Iverson

== Births ==
- June 29 – Artur Avila, Brazilian-born mathematician.

== Deaths ==
- January – Oscar H. Banker (b. 1895), Armenian American inventor.
- March 11 – Noël Poynter (b. 1908), English medical historian.
- March 17 – Henry Aaron Hill (b. 1915), American fluorocarbon chemist, first African American president of the American Chemical Society.
- April 5 – Eugène Gabritschevsky (b. 1893), Russian biologist and artist.
- May 6 – Karl Wilhelm Reinmuth (b. 1892), German astronomer.
- June 1 – Werner Forssmann (b. 1904), German physician, recipient of the Nobel Prize in Physiology or Medicine.
- October 10 – Guido Fanconi (b. 1892), Swiss pediatrician.
- October 12 – Katharine Burr Blodgett (b. 1898), American physicist and chemist.
- October 30 – Sir Barnes Wallis (b. 1887), English aeronautical engineer.
- December 4 – Walther Müller (b. 1905), German-born American physicist
- December 7 – Cecilia Payne-Gaposchkin (b. 1900), English-born American astronomer and astrophysicist.
