= 1983 in science =

The year 1983 in science and technology was marked by many significant events, as listed below.

== Anthropology ==
- New Zealand anthropologist Derek Freeman publishes Margaret Mead and Samoa: The Making and Unmaking of an Anthropological Myth, critical of Coming of Age in Samoa (1928) by Margaret Mead (d. 1978).

== Astronomy and space science ==
- June 13 – Pioneer 10 passes the orbit of Neptune, becoming the first man-made object to travel beyond the major planets of the Solar System.
- September 26 – The Soyuz T-10-1 mission ends in a pad abort at the Baikonur Cosmodrome, when a pad fire occurs at the base of the Soyuz U rocket during the launch countdown. The escape tower system, attached to the top of the capsule containing the crew and Soyuz spacecraft, fires immediately pulling the crew safe from the vehicle, six seconds before the rocket explodes, destroying the launch complex.

== Biology ==
- April – Kary Mullis discovers polymerase chain reaction.
- May 20 – First reports of HIV as a possible cause of AIDS, by independent virology teams led by Luc Montagnier and Robert Gallo.
- June – First report of using a monoclonal antibody as a medical test.
- July – Determination of the first sequences of type I and type II keratins and prediction of the α-helical domain structure of intermediate filament proteins.
- November 3 – Michael Berridge and colleagues publish their discovery that inositol trisphosphate acts as a second messenger system in cell signaling.
- December 31 – Publication of an issue of Australian Journal of Herpetology begins the Wells and Wellington affair.

== Computer science ==
- January 1 – The ARPANET officially changes to use the Internet Protocol, creating the Internet.
- August – Specification for a Musical Instrument Digital Interface (originally devised by Dave Smith of Sequential Circuits) published.
- September 27 – Richard Stallman announces the GNU Project.
- October 25 – Word processor software Multi-Tool Word, soon to become Microsoft Word, is released. It is primarily the work of programmers Richard Brodie and Charles Simonyi. Free demonstration copies on disk are distributed with the November issue of PC World magazine.
- November 10 – Fred Cohen demonstrates a self-replicating source code which his academic adviser at the University of Southern California, Leonard Adleman, likens to a virus.
- December – Yugoslav popular science magazine Galaksija releases a special (January 1984) issue, "Računari u vašoj kući", with complete instructions on how to build a full-featured home computer, Galaksija.
- The suffix automaton data structure is introduced.
- The US Federal Government standardizes Ada (programming language), a strongly typed, comb-structured computer language, with exception handlers, for general-purpose programming.

== History of science ==
- Keith Thomas publishes Man and the Natural World: changing attitudes in England, 1500–1800.

== Mathematics ==
- Daniel Gorenstein (with Richard Lyons) proves the trichotomy theorem for finite simple groups of characteristic 2 type and rank at least 4, and announces that proof of the classification of finite simple groups is complete (although that for quasithin groups has not been demonstrated at this time).

== Medicine ==
- July 25 – World's first dedicated hospital ward for HIV/AIDS patients opens at San Francisco General Hospital.

== Metrology ==
- October 21 – At the seventeenth General Conference on Weights and Measures, the length of a metre is redefined as the distance light travels in vacuum in 1/299,792,458 of a second.

== Paleontology ==
- January – First skeleton of Baryonyx discovered in the Weald Clay formation of Surrey, England, the most complete dinosaur skeleton discovered in the UK at this date, becoming the holotype specimen of Baryonyx walkeri, named by palaeontologists Alan J. Charig and Angela C. Milner in 1986.

== Psychology ==
- Howard Gardner's book Frames of Mind presents his theory of multiple intelligences.
- Gísli Guðjónsson creates the Gudjonsson Suggestibility Scale.

== Technology ==
- April – 3D printing patents are filed by Alain Le Mehaute, Olivier de Witte and Jean Claude André in France and by Chuck Hull in the United States.

== Organizations ==
- Spain re-joins CERN after having left in 1969 (originally joined for the first time in 1961).

== Awards ==
- Nobel Prizes
  - Physics – Subrahmanyan Chandrasekhar, William Alfred Fowler
  - Chemistry – Henry Taube
  - Medicine – Barbara McClintock
- Turing Award – Ken Thompson, Dennis Ritchie

== Births ==
- June Huh, Korean American mathematician

== Deaths ==
- February 27 – Nikolai Aleksandrovich Kozyrev, Russian astronomer and astrophysicist (b. 1908)
- March 18 – Ivan Vinogradov, Russian mathematician (b. 1891)
- April 15 – Vera Faddeeva, Russian mathematician (b. 1906)
- May 22 – Albert Claude, Belgian biologist, co-recipient of the Nobel Prize in Physiology or Medicine in 1974 (b. 1898)
- August 2 – Edmund Jaeger, American naturalist (b. 1887)
- October 7 – George O. Abell, American astronomer (b. 1927)
- October 19 – Dorothy Stuart Russell, Australian-born British pathologist (b. 1895)
- October 24 – Elie Carafoli, Romanian aeronautical engineer (b. 1901)
- October 26 – Alfred Tarski, Polish American logician and mathematician (b. 1901)
- December 6 – Bruce Irons, English-born engineer and mathematician (b. 1924; suicide)
