= 1991 in science =

The year 1991 in science and technology involved many significant events, some listed below.

== Astronomy and space exploration ==
- April 5 – Space Shuttle Atlantis leaves an observatory in Earth's orbit to study gamma rays before returning on April 11. It is followed by Space Shuttle Discovery, which studies instruments related to the Strategic Defense Initiative from April 29 to May 6. Space Shuttle Columbia carries the Spacelab into orbit on June 5.
- May 18 – Helen Sharman becomes the first British person in space, flying with the Soyuz TM-12 mission.
- October 29 – The Galileo probe becomes the first spacecraft to visit an asteroid (951 Gaspra).
- Steven Balbus and John F. Hawley publish their insights on magnetorotational instability.
- Asteroid 6859 Datemasamune is discovered by Masahiro Koishikawa.
- Asteroid 11514 Tsunenaga is discovered by Masahiro Koishikawa.
- There are four lunar eclipses: three penumbral on January 30, July 26, and June 27, and one minor partial lunar eclipse on December 21.
- There are two solar eclipses: one annular eclipse on January 15, and a very long total eclipse on July 11 (lasting 6 minutes and 53 seconds).

== Chemistry ==
- Carbon nanotubes discovered in the insoluble material of arc-burned graphite rods by Sumio Iijima of NEC.

== Computer science ==
- February 20 – Python, a programming language created by Guido van Rossum, Is released.
- February 26 – Tim Berners-Lee, an English computer scientist working at CERN, introduces WorldWideWeb (the first web browser), and a WYSIWYG HTML editor.
- May 14 – Nicola Pellow, an intern working under the direction of Berners-Lee, introduces Line Mode Browser, the first cross-platform web browser.
- June 5 – Phil Zimmermann posts the first Pretty Good Privacy (PGP) data encryption program.
- June 23 – The video game Sonic the Hedgehog is first released, propelling the Sega Genesis 16-bit console into mass popularity.
- August 6 – The first website goes online at CERN.
- August 25 – Linus Torvalds posts messages to the Usenet newsgroup comp.os.minix, regarding the new operating system kernel he has developed, called Linux.
- October – Apple releases the PowerBook laptop computer.
- The Trojan Room coffee pot at the Computer Laboratory, University of Cambridge, England, inspires the first webcam.

== Conservation ==
- October 1 – The New Zealand Resource Management Act 1991 comes into effect.

== Geophysics ==
- Alan Hildebrand and others provide support for the Alvarez hypothesis for the Cretaceous–Paleogene extinction event by proposing the Chicxulub crater in the Yucatán Peninsula of Mexico as the impact site for a large asteroid 66 million years ago.
- The Ames crater impact structure is identified in Major County, Oklahoma.

== Mathematics ==
- July – English physicist Philip Candelas and colleagues show that mirror symmetry could be used to solve problems in enumerative geometry.
- Qiudong Wang produces a global solution to the n-body problem.

== Physics ==
- January 1 – Finland joins CERN.
- July 1 – Poland joins CERN.
- October 15 – the "Oh-My-God particle", the first ultra-high-energy cosmic ray measured at an energy of 3×10^{20} eV (40,000,000 times that of the highest energy protons that have been produced in a particle accelerator), is observed at the University of Utah HiRes observatory in Dugway Proving Ground, Utah.

== Physiology and medicine ==
- Takotsubo cardiomyopathy first studied.

== Technology ==
- July 1 – World's first GSM telephone call made in Finland.

== Publications ==
- The first open-access scientific online archive, arXiv, is begun as a preprint service for physicists, initiated by Paul Ginsparg.

== Awards ==
- Nobel Prizes
  - Physics – Pierre-Gilles de Gennes
  - Chemistry – Richard R. Ernst
  - Medicine – Erwin Neher, Bert Sakmann
- Turing Award – Robin Milner

== Births ==
- February 28 – Sheree Atcheson, Sri Lankan-Irish computer scientist
- Hong Wang, Chinese mathematician

== Deaths ==
- January 30 – John Bardeen (b. 1908), American physicist, co-inventor of the transistor and twice winner of the Nobel Prize in Physics.
- February 6 – Salvador Luria (b. 1912), Italian-born biologist, co-winner of the Nobel Prize in Physiology or Medicine.
- February 23 – Sir Charles Illingworth (b. 1899), British surgeon.
- March 1 – Edwin H. Land (b. 1909), American inventor of the Land Camera.
- June 2 – Mary Loveless (b. 1899), American immunologist.
- June 5 – Min Chueh Chang (b. 1908), Chinese American embryologist.
- July 4 – Victor Chang (b. 1936), Australian cardiac surgeon, murdered.
- August 23 – Florence B. Seibert (b. 1897), American biochemist.
- December 2 – Anne Beloff-Chain (b. 1921), British biochemist.
