= 1977 in science =

The year 1977 in science and technology involved some significant events, listed below.

== Astronomy and space exploration ==
- March 10 – Rings of Uranus discovered by Kuiper Airborne Observatory measurements of star occultation.
- August 12 – The NASA Space Shuttle Enterprise makes its first test free-flight from the back of a jetliner.
- August 15 – Ohio State University Radio Observatory, working on the SETI project, receives a strong narrowband radio signal from deep space; the event is named the Wow! signal for a notation made by researcher Jerry R. Ehman.
- August 20 – Voyager program: The United States launches the Voyager 2 spacecraft to study the outer Solar System.
- September 5 – Voyager program: Voyager 1 is launched after a brief delay.
- September 20 – Petrozavodsk phenomenon observed in northern skies.
- 2060 Chiron, first of the outer Solar System asteroids known as Centaurs, discovered by Charlie Kowal.
- Discovery of the Carina Dwarf galaxy by the UK Schmidt Telescope.
- Thorne–Żytkow objects, a bizarre hybrid of red supergiants and neutron stars, are first theorised.

== Biology ==
- The first complete genome is sequenced - a tiny bacterium-infecting virus called Phi X 174, with just 11 genes, and a little over 5000 base pairs.
- Carl Woese and George E. Fox classify archaea as a new, separate domain of life.
- U.S. Food and Drug Administration approves LAL (Limulus amebocyte lysate) for testing drugs, products and devices that come in contact with the blood. Prior to this date, a much slower and more expensive test on rabbits has been used for this purpose.
- October 22 – Nothomyrmecia, the "dinosaur ant", is rediscovered, in Poochera, South Australia, more than 45 years after it is first described.

== Chemistry ==
- Frederick Sanger and colleagues introduce Sanger sequencing.

== Computer science ==
- January – The Commodore PET is announced at Winter CES. The first units are delivered to customers in October; back-orders for the popular system last for months and in early 1978 Commodore discontinues the 4KB model. The PET is the launch computer for Commodore which will later gain prominence with the Commodore 64 in 1982, the single most produced home computer with over 17 million produced.
- June 5 – The first Apple II home computers (largely designed by Steve Wozniak) go on sale in the U.S., among the first successful mass-produced microcomputers.
- August 3 – The TRS-80 Model I is announced at a press conference in New York City. Radio Shack begin sales in September, and despite a sales forecast of only 3,000 units per year, over 10,000 are sold in just one and a half months. Radio Shack will later develop an entire line of computers over the following 20 years.
- September – The Atari 2600 home video game console is released.

== Cryptography ==
- RSA algorithm for public-key cryptography is described by Ron Rivest, Adi Shamir, and Leonard Adleman at MIT.

== History of science ==
- Roy Porter publishes The Making of Geology: Earth Science in Britain 1660-1815.
- Brian Randell and Allen Coombs publish the first detailed information on the 1943 Colossus computer.

== Mathematics ==
- November – Graham's number first becomes popularly known.
- Hillel Furstenberg reformulates Szemerédi's theorem according to ergodic theory.
- Lajos Szilassi discovers the Szilassi polyhedron.
- Joel L. Weiner describes a version of the tennis ball theorem.

== Medicine ==
- January 18 – Scientists identify a previously unknown bacterium as the cause of the "Legionnaires' disease".
- July 3 – Dr Raymond Damadian with Larry Minkoff and Michael Goldsmith perform the first magnetic resonance imaging body scan of a human.
- September 16 – The first percutaneous coronary intervention on a sentient patient is performed by cardiologist Andreas Gruentzig in Zurich.
- October 26 – The world's last natural infection of smallpox is reported in Somalia.
- December 16 – The first microelectronic multi-channel cochlear implant, developed by Ingeborg Hochmair and Erwin Hochmair, is implanted.

== Oceanography ==
- February 7 – Discovery of deep ocean hydrothermal vent ecosystems near the Galapagos Islands.

== Physics ==
- The bottom quark is discovered experimentally by Leon M. Lederman at Fermilab.
- Steven Weinberg publishes the first edition of The First Three Minutes: A Modern View of the Origin of the Universe in the United States.

== Technology ==
- August 23 – Gossamer Condor demonstrates that it is the first human-powered aircraft capable of controlled and sustained flight by winning the Kremer prize. It was created by Paul MacCready and Peter Lissaman of AeroVironment and piloted by Bryan Allen at Minter Field in Shafter, California.
- December 1 – Lockheed Have Blue becomes the first stealth aircraft to fly.
- First general exercise sports bra invented by Lisa Lindahl and Polly Smith in the United States.

== Awards ==
- Nobel Prizes
  - Physics – Philip Warren Anderson, Sir Nevill Francis Mott, John Hasbrouck van Vleck
  - Chemistry – Ilya Prigogine
  - Medicine – Roger Guillemin, Andrew V. Schally, Rosalyn Yalow
- Turing Award – John Backus

== Births ==
- May 3 – Maryam Mirzakhani (d. 2017), Iranian-born mathematician.

== Deaths ==
- February 5 – Oskar Klein (b. 1894), Swedish theoretical physicist.
- February 15 – Herman Johannes Lam (b. 1892), Dutch botanist.
- February 16 – Rózsa Péter (b. 1905), Hungarian mathematician, "founding mother of recursive function theory".
- June 3 – Archibald Hill (b. 1886), English physiologist, winner of the Nobel Prize in Physiology or Medicine.
- June 16 – Wernher von Braun (b. 1912), German-born American physicist and engineer.
- December 7 – Peter Carl Goldmark (b. 1906), Hungarian-born American engineer
