= 1989 in science =

The year 1989 in science and technology involved many significant events, some listed below.

== Astronomy ==
- August – Asteroid 4769 Castalia is the first asteroid directly imaged, by radar from Arecibo.
- August 25 – The Voyager 2 spacecraft makes its closest approach to Neptune, providing definitive proof of the planet's rings.
- September 5 – Pluto–Charon barycentre comes to perihelion.
- November 18 – Cosmic Background Explorer launched, "the starting point for cosmology as a precision science".
- Asteroid 5128 Wakabayashi is discovered by Masahiro Koishikawa.
- 4292 Aoba is discovered.
- 4871 Riverside is discovered.
- 6089 Izumi is discovered.
- 6190 Rennes is discovered
- 8084 Dallas is discovered.

== Biology ==
- Discovery of the cystic fibrosis trans-membrane conductance regulator gene.
- The New Zealand Department of Conservation begins to implement a Kākāpō Recovery Plan.

== Computer science ==
- March 12 – Tim Berners-Lee submits a memorandum, titled "Information Management: A Proposal", to the management at CERN for a system that would eventually become the World Wide Web.
- June 8 – GNU Bash is released.
- July 26 – A federal grand jury indicts Cornell University student Robert Tappan Morris, Jr. for releasing a computer virus, making him the first person to be prosecuted under the 1986 Computer Fraud and Abuse Act in the United States.

== Environment ==
- The global concentration of carbon dioxide in Earth's atmosphere reaches 350 ppm (parts per million) by volume.

== Physics ==
- January – Supplee's paradox is published.
- March 23 – Stanley Pons and Martin Fleischmann announce cold fusion at the University of Utah.

== Physiology and medicine ==
- The Oxford Database of Perinatal Trials begins publishing online.
- The hepatitis C virus (HCV) is first identified by Michael Houghton and his team.

== Technology ==
- July 17 – The Northrop Grumman B-2 Spirit "Stealth Bomber" aircraft, developed for the United States Air Force, first flies.
- Isamu Akasaki produces the first Gallium nitride p-n junction blue/UV light-emitting diode.

== Awards ==
- Nobel Prizes
  - Physics – Norman F. Ramsey, Hans G. Dehmelt, Wolfgang Paul
  - Chemistry – Sidney Altman, Thomas R. Cech
  - Medicine – J. Michael Bishop, Harold E. Varmus
- Turing Award – William (Velvel) Kahan

== Births ==
- May 9 – Katie Bouman, American computer imaging scientist
- June – Yu Deng, Chinese-born mathematician

== Deaths ==
- February 27 – Konrad Lorenz (born 1903), Austrian zoologist.
- March 18 – Sir Harold Jeffreys (born 1891), English mathematician.
- April 24 – Horace Hodes (born 1907), American medical researcher.
- August 10 – Isabella Forshall (born 1900), English pediatric surgeon.
- August 12 – William Shockley (born 1910), American physicist.
- August 20 – George Adamson (born 1906), British wildlife conservationist.
- August 29 – Sir Peter Scott (born 1909), English wildlife conservationist.
- October 11 – M. King Hubbert (born 1903), American geophysicist.
- October 28 – Louise Hay (born 1935), French-born American mathematician; breast cancer.
- December 14 – Andrei Sakharov (born 1921), Soviet Russian nuclear physicist and political dissident.
