= 1988 in science =

The year 1988 in science and technology involved many significant events, some listed below.

== Astronomy and space exploration ==
- September 29 – NASA resumes Space Shuttle flights, grounded after the Challenger disaster.
- November 15 – In the Soviet Union, the uncrewed Shuttle Buran is launched by an Energia rocket on her maiden orbital spaceflight (this was the first and last space flight for the shuttle).
- Canadian astronomers Bruce Campbell, G. A. H. Walker and Stephenson Yang publish radial-velocity observations suggesting that an extrasolar planet orbits the star Gamma Cephei, although its existence is not confirmed until 2003.
- Asteroid 3994 Ayashi is discovered by Masahiro Koishikawa.
- 4407 Taihaku is discovered.
- 4539 Miyagino is discovered.

== Climatology ==
- NASA climate scientist James Hansen uses the term global warming in testimony to the United States Congress bringing it to public attention.
- The Intergovernmental Panel on Climate Change (IPCC) is established.

== Computer science ==
- August – Internet Relay Chat, the first Internet-based chat protocol, is created by Jarkko Oikarinen in Finland.
- November 2 – The Morris worm, the first computer worm distributed via the Internet, written by Robert Tappan Morris, is launched from Massachusetts Institute of Technology in the U.S.
- November 17 – The Netherlands becomes the second country to get connected to the Internet.
- c. December – The first proper and official Internet connection to Europe is made between the National Science Foundation Network at Princeton, New Jersey and Nordunet in Stockholm, Sweden.
- The first version of the Photoshop graphics software, devised by Thomas Knoll, ships with Barneyscan image scanners.
- The NeXT Computer is released.
- Tim Berners-Lee begins openly to discuss his plans for what will become the World Wide Web at CERN.

== Physiology and medicine ==
- May 1 – The initial case definition of Chronic fatigue syndrome (the "Holmes definition") is published, displacing the name Chronic Epstein-Barr virus syndrome.
- August 13 – 2nd International Studies of Infarct Survival (ISIS-2) demonstrates beneficial effects of aspirin in treatment of myocardial infarction.
- Patricia Bath patents the Laserphaco Probe, a device "for ablating and removing cataract lenses".

== Technology ==
- TAT-8, the first transatlantic telephone cable to use optical fiber, is completed, facilitating linking of the American and European Internet.

== Publications ==
- Stephen Hawking publishes A Brief History of Time.

== Awards ==
- Nobel Prizes
  - Physics – Leon M. Lederman, Melvin Schwartz, Jack Steinberger
  - Chemistry – Johann Deisenhofer, Robert Huber, Hartmut Michel
  - Medicine – Sir James W. Black, Gertrude B. Elion, George H. Hitchings
- Turing Award – Ivan Sutherland

== Deaths ==
- January 11 – Isidor Isaac Rabi (born 1898), Polish American physicist, winner of Nobel Prize in Physics in 1944 for invention of the atomic beam magnetic resonance method of measuring magnetic properties of atoms and molecules.
- January 18 – Cataldo Agostinelli (born 1894), Italian mathematician
- January 21 – E. B. Ford (born 1901), English ecological geneticist and lepidopterist.
- February 15 – Richard Feynman (born 1918), American physicist, winner of Nobel Prize in Physics in 1965 for his work on quantum electrodynamics.
- March 7 – Edmund Berkeley, American computer scientist (born 1909)
- March 8 – Werner Hartmann, German physicist (b. 1912)
- April 27 – Valery Legasov (born 1936), Russian nuclear physicist, known for the investigation of causes of the Chernobyl disaster and planning the mitigation of its consequences.
- May 8 – Robert A. Heinlein (born 1907), American "hard" science fiction author.
- May 20 – Ana Aslan (born 1897), Romanian biologist.
- May 27 – Ernst Ruska (born 1906), German winner of Nobel Prize in Physics for work in electron optics.
- June 9 – Karl Kraus, German theoretical physicist (b. 1938)
- September 1 – Luis Walter Alvarez (born 1911), American experimental physicist, winner of Nobel Prize in Physics in 1968 for bubble chamber research into particle physics.
- August 6 – Illa Martin, dendrologist, botanist, conservationist and dentist (b. 1900)
- October 9 – Felix Wankel (born 1902), German mechanical engineer.
- December 4 – Osman Achmatowicz (born 1899), Polish chemist
- December 21 – Nikolaas Tinbergen (born 1907), Dutch-born ethologist, ornithologist, winner of Nobel Prize in Physiology or Medicine.
- December 30 – Dennis H. Klatt (born 1938), American pioneer of speech synthesis.
