= 1931 in science =

| List of years in science | (table) |
- … 1921; 1922; 1923; 1924; 1925; 1926; 1927; 1928; 1929; 1930; 1931; 1932; 1933; 1934; 1935; 1936; 1937; 1938; 1939; 1940; 1941 …
- Art; Archaeology; Architecture; Literature; Music; Philosophy; Science; +...

The year 1931 in science and technology involved some significant events, listed below.

== Astronomy ==
- French astronomer Bernard Lyot invents the coronagraph.

== Chemistry ==
- November 26 – Harold Urey and associates at Columbia University discover deuterium by the fractional distillation of liquid hydrogen, leading to demonstration of the existence of heavy water.
- Erich Hückel proposes Hückel's rule, which explains when a planar ring molecule will have aromatic properties.
- The first aerogel is created by Steven Kistler.

== Earth sciences ==
- Modified Mercalli intensity scale introduced as a seismic scale for earthquakes in the United States.

== History of science ==
- Het Nederlandsch Historisch Natuurwetenschappelijk Museum ("The Dutch Historical Museum of the Natural Sciences") opens in Leiden.

== Mathematics ==
- January – Kurt Gödel's "On Formally Undecidable Propositions..." is published in Monatshefte für Mathematik.

== Physics ==
- Ernst Ruska and Max Knoll build the first prototype electron microscope.
- Paul Dirac proposes that the existence of a single magnetic monopole in the universe would suffice to explain the quantization of electrical charge.

== Physiology and medicine ==
- May–October – American pathologists Ernest William Goodpasture and Alice Miles Woodruff publish their results on growing influenza and several other viruses in fertilised chicken eggs. Richard Shope publishes three papers identifying influenza A virus as the cause of swine influenza.
- December 3 – The drug Alka-Seltzer is placed on the market.
- Adolf Butenandt discovers androsterone.
- John Haven Emerson and August Krogh introduce new forms of negative pressure ventilator.
- The first electroencephalography is performed by Hans Berger in Germany.
- Lucy Wills, working in India, demonstrates that anemia in pregnancy can be reversed using brewer's yeast.

== Technology ==
- May 27 – Swiss-born scientist Auguste Piccard and his assistant, engineer Paul Kipfer, taking off from Augsburg, Germany, reach a record altitude of 15,785 m (51,788 ft) in a balloon with a pressurized gondola, gathering data on the upper atmosphere and measuring cosmic rays, the first human flight into the stratosphere.
- October 5 – American aviators Clyde Edward Pangborn and Hugh Herndon, Jr., complete the first non-stop flight across the Pacific Ocean, from Misawa, Japan, to East Wenatchee, Washington, in 41½ hours.
- October 24 – The George Washington Bridge across the Hudson River in the United States is dedicated; it opens to traffic the following day. At 3,500 feet (1,100 m), it nearly doubles the previous record for the longest suspension span in the world.
- November 19 – David Gottlieb introduces his Baffle Ball machine in the United States, the first commercially successful pinball table.
- December 14 – British electronics engineer Alan Blumlein of EMI submits a UK patent application for "Improvements in and relating to Sound-transmission, Sound-recording and Sound-reproducing Systems" – binaural or stereophonic sound.
- László Bíró first exhibits his ballpoint pen, in Budapest.
- George Beauchamp invents the electric guitar.
- John H. Sharp of Chicago files the first patent for a torque wrench.
- Construction of the Hoover Dam begins on the Colorado River in the United States (chief designing engineer: John L. Savage).

== Other events ==
- January 3 – Albert Einstein begins doing research at the California Institute of Technology, along with astronomer Edwin Hubble. In October the Caltech Department of Physics faculty and graduate students meet with Einstein as a guest.
- November 21 – Release of James Whale's film of Frankenstein in New York, with electrical effects designed by Kenneth Strickfaden.

== Awards ==
- Nobel Prizes
  - Chemistry – Carl Bosch, Friedrich Bergius
  - Medicine – Otto Heinrich Warburg

== Births ==
- January 20 – David Lee, American physicist, recipient of the Nobel Prize in Physics.
- January 28 – Chen Xingbi (died 2019), Chinese electronics engineer.
- February 10 – Carl Rettenmeyer (died 2009), American biologist specialising in army ants.
- March 22 – Burton Richter (died 2018), American physicist, recipient of the Nobel Prize in Physics.
- March 25 – John A. Eddy (died 2009), American astronomer.
- May 25 – Georgy Grechko (died 2017), Soviet Russian cosmonaut.
- May 31 – John Robert Schrieffer (died 2019), American physicist, recipient of the Nobel Prize in Physics.
- June 27
  - David Mervyn Blow (died 2004), English biophysicist.
  - Martinus J. G. Veltman, Dutch physicist, recipient of the Nobel Prize in Physics.
- August 8 – Roger Penrose, English mathematical physicist, recipient of the Nobel Prize in Physics.
- August 15 – Richard F. Heck (died 2015), American chemist, recipient of the Nobel Prize in Chemistry.
- August 20 – Ayhan Ulubelen, Turkish natural product chemist.
- August 23 – Hamilton O. Smith, American microbiologist, recipient of the Nobel Prize in Physiology or Medicine.
- August 30 – Jack Swigert (died 1982), American astronaut.
- September 10 – Idelisa Bonnelly, Dominican marine biologist.
- September 21 – Syukuro Manabe, Japanese-born climatologist, recipient of the Nobel Prize in Physics.
- September 27 – W. Maxwell Cowan (died 2002), South African neuroanatomist.
- September 29 – James Watson Cronin (died 2016), American nuclear physicist, recipient of the Nobel Prize in Physics.
- October 1 – Emory Kemp (died 2020), American civil engineering historian.
- October 6 – Riccardo Giacconi, Italian-born physicist, recipient of the Nobel Prize in Physics.
- October 9 – Magdalena K. P. Smith Meyer (died 2004), South African acarologist.
- October 12 – Ole-Johan Dahl (died 2002), Norwegian computer scientist, pioneer of object-oriented programming.
- October 15 – A. P. J. Abdul Kalam (died 2015), President of India and rocket scientist.
- October 25 – Klaus Hasselmann, German climatologist, recipient of the Nobel Prize in Physics.
- November 28 – Gurdev Singh Gill (died 2023), Indian-born Canadian physician.
- December 30 – John T. Houghton (died 2020), British climate scientist.

== Deaths ==
- January 1 – Martinus Beijerinck (born 1851), Dutch microbiologist and botanist.
- February 2 – Frederick Marten Hale (born 1864), British explosives engineer.
- February 3 – Herman Frederik Carel ten Kate (born 1858), Dutch anthropologist.
- February 11 – Sir Charles Parsons (born 1854), British inventor of the steam turbine.
- February 24 – Fanny Gates (born 1872), American physicist
- February 26 – Otto Wallach (born 1847), German chemist, recipient of the Nobel Prize in Chemistry.
- May 9 – Albert A. Michelson (born 1852), Polish American physicist, recipient of the Nobel Prize in Physics.
- May 23 – Aldred Scott Warthin (born 1867), American cancer geneticist.
- July 6 – Edward Goodrich Acheson (born 1856), American industrial chemist.
- September 20 – Joan Beauchamp Procter (born 1897), English herpetologist.
- October 8 – General Sir John Monash (born 1865), Australian civil engineer.
- October 17 – Alfons Maria Jakob (born 1884), German neuropathologist.
- October 18 – Thomas Edison (born 1847), American inventor.
- November 27 – Sir David Bruce (born 1855), Scottish microbiologist.
