= 1840 in archaeology =

List of years in archaeology	(table)
- … 1830; 1831; 1832; 1833; 1834; 1835; 1836; 1837; 1838; 1839; 1840; 1841; 1842; 1843; 1844; 1845; 1846; 1847; 1848; 1849; 1850 …
- In science 1837 1838 1839 1840 1841 1842 1843
- Art; Archaeology; Architecture; Literature; Music; Philosophy; Science; +...

Below are notable events in archaeology that occurred in 1840.

== Explorations ==
- John Lloyd Stephens and Frederick Catherwood explore ruins of the Maya civilization including Quiriguá, Q'umarkaj, Palenque, and Uxmal.

== Publications ==
- Charles Roach Smith - Collectanea Antiqua, vol. 1.

== Finds ==
- Cuerdale Hoard discovered by stoneworkers in Lancashire, England.

== Births ==
- February 7 - Charles Warren, British Biblical archaeologist (d. 1927)
- March 26 - George Smith, British Assyriologist (d. 1876)
- August 6 - Adolph Francis Alphonse Bandelier, Swiss-born New World archaeologist (d. 1914)

== See also ==
- List of years in archaeology
- 1839 in archaeology
- 1841 in archaeology
