= 1850 in archaeology =

List of years in archaeology	(table)
- … 1840; 1841; 1842; 1843; 1844; 1845; 1846; 1847; 1848; 1849; 1850; 1851; 1852; 1853; 1854; 1855; 1856; 1857; 1858; 1859; 1860 …
- In science 1847 1848 1849 1850 1851 1852 1853
- Art; Archaeology; Architecture; Literature; Music; Philosophy; Science; +...

Below are notable events in archaeology that occurred in 1850.

== Excavations ==
- First excavations at Uruk by William Kennett Loftus (continues to 1854).

== Finds ==
- Skara Brae revealed by weather.
- Tara Brooch (c.700 AD) found near Laytown, County Meath, Ireland.
- Neolithic site at Barnenez in Brittany recognised as a tumulus.

== Births ==
- March 18 – Alfred Maudslay, explorer, archaeologist and writer of accounts of the ruins of the Maya civilization (died 1931)
- September 18 – Grigore Tocilescu, Romanian historian, archaeologist, epigrapher and folkorist, author of many books on ancient Dacia (died 1909)

== See also ==
- List of years in archaeology
- 1849 in archaeology
- 1851 in archaeology
