= 1844 in science =

List of years in science	(table)
- … 1834; 1835; 1836; 1837; 1838; 1839; 1840; 1841; 1842; 1843; 1844; 1845; 1846; 1847; 1848; 1849; 1850; 1851; 1852; 1853; 1854 …
- Art; Archaeology; Architecture; Literature; Music; Philosophy; Science; +...

The year 1844 in science and technology involved some significant events, listed below.

== Astronomy ==
- August 10 – German astronomer Friedrich Bessel deduces from the motion of the bright stars Sirius and Procyon that they have dark companions.

== Biology ==
- June 3 – The last definitely recorded pair of great auks (Pinguinus impennis) are killed on the Icelandic island of Eldey.
- August 1 – Opening of Berlin Zoological Garden.
- Gabriel Gustav Valentin notes the digestive activity of pancreatic juice.
- George Robert Gray begins publication in London of The Genera of Birds.
- Joseph Dalton Hooker begins publication of The Botany of the Antarctic Voyage of H.M. Discovery Ships Erebus and Terror ... 1839–1843 in London.

== Chemistry ==
- Karl Klaus discovers ruthenium.
- Professor Gustaf Erik Pasch of Stockholm is granted the privilege of manufacturing a safety match.
- French chemist Adolphe Wurtz reports the first synthesis of copper hydride, a well-known reducing agent and catalyst in organic chemistry.

== Earth sciences ==
- Robert Chambers' anonymous Vestiges of the Natural History of Creation, which paves the way for acceptance of Darwin's The Origin of Species, is published in Britain.

== Mathematics ==
- Joseph Liouville finds the first transcendental number.
- Hermann Grassmann studies vectors with more than three dimensions.

== Medicine ==
- Irish physician Francis Rynd utilises a hollow hypodermic needle to make the first recorded subcutaneous injections, specifically of a sedative to treat neuralgia.

== Metrology ==
- Joseph Whitworth introduces the thou.

== Physics ==
- William Robert Grove publishes The Correlation of Physical Forces, the first comprehensive account of the conservation of energy.

== Technology ==
- January 30 – Charles Goodyear patents the vulcanisation of rubber in the United States.
- May 11 – Samuel Morse sends the first message using Morse code.
- June – Henry Fox Talbot commences publication of the first book illustrated with photographs from a camera, The Pencil of Nature.
- Uriah A. Boyden develops an improved outward-flow water turbine.
- Robert Bunsen invents the grease-spot photometer.
- Thomas and Caleb Pratt design the Pratt truss bridge.
- Dublin iron-founder Richard Turner begins assembling components for the Palm house at Kew Gardens in London, the first large-scale structural use of wrought iron.
- Egide Walschaerts of the Belgian State Railways originates Walschaerts valve gear for the steam locomotive.

== Events ==
- July 27 – Death of English chemist and physicist John Dalton in Manchester where his body lies in honour in the Town Hall and more than 40,000 people file past his coffin.

== Awards ==
- Copley Medal: Carlo Matteucci
- Wollaston Medal for Geology: William Conybeare

== Births ==
- February 1 – G. Stanley Hall (died 1924), American psychologist.
- February 7 – Alexei Pavlovich Fedchenko (died 1873), Russian naturalist.
- February 20 – Ludwig Boltzmann (died 1906), Austrian physicist famous for the invention of statistical mechanics.
- March 25 – Adolf Engler (died 1930), German botanist.
- June 10 – Carl Hagenbeck (died 1913), German zoologist.
- July 1 – H. Newell Martin (died 1896), British physiologist.
- August 6 – James Henry Greathead (died 1896), South African-born English civil engineer.
- August 13 – Friedrich Miescher (died 1895), Swiss biochemist.
- August 22 – George W. DeLong (died 1881), American Arctic explorer.
- September 11 – Henry Alleyne Nicholson (died 1899), English paleontologist and zoologist.
- October 3 – Patrick Manson (died 1922), Scottish parasitologist, the "father of tropical medicine" .
- October 28 – Mary Katharine Brandegee née Layne (died 1920), American botanist.
- November 25 – Karl Benz (died 1929), German automotive engineer.
- Varvara Rudneva (d. 1899), Russian physician.

== Deaths ==
- June 19 – Étienne Geoffroy Saint-Hilaire (born 1772), French naturalist.
- July 27 – John Dalton (born 1766), English chemist and physicist.
- August 30 – Francis Baily (born 1774), English astronomer.
- December 28 – Thomas Henderson (born 1798), Scottish astronomer.
