= 1841 in science =

List of years in science	(table)
- … 1831; 1832; 1833; 1834; 1835; 1836; 1837; 1838; 1839; 1840; 1841; 1842; 1843; 1844; 1845; 1846; 1847; 1848; 1849; 1850; 1851 …
- Art; Archaeology; Architecture; Literature; Music; Philosophy; Science; +...

The year 1841 in science and technology involved some significant events, listed below.

== Biology ==
- Rev. Miles Joseph Berkeley demonstrates that Phytophthora infestans (potato blight) is a fungal infection.
- Royal Botanic Gardens, Kew, first open to the public and William Hooker appointed director.
- John Gould begins publication of A Monograph of the Macropodidae, or Family of Kangaroos.

== Chemistry ==
- Theobromine is first discovered in cacao beans by Russian chemist Alexander Woskresensky.
- Uranium is first isolated, by Eugène-Melchior Péligot.
- Chemical Society of London founded by Thomas Graham.
- Reinsch test for heavy metals discovered by Hugo Reinsch.

== Exploration ==
- January 27 – The active volcano Mount Erebus in Antarctica is discovered and named by James Clark Ross.
- January 28 – Ross discovers the "Victoria Barrier", later known as the Ross Ice Shelf.
- Ross additionally discovers the Ross Sea, Victoria Land and Mount Terror.

== Geology ==
- Hugh Miller publishes The Old Red Sandstone.
- The first comprehensive geological map of France is published by Dufrénoy and Élie de Beaumont, the result of thirteen years of investigations.

== Human sciences ==
- November 13 – Scottish surgeon James Braid attends his first demonstration of animal magnetism (given by Charles Lafontaine in Manchester, England) which leads to Braid's study of the subject he eventually calls hypnotism.

== Mathematics ==
- Prussian mathematician Karl Weierstrass discovers but does not publish the Laurent expansion theorem.
- English mathematician William Rutherford calculates an approximation of π to 208 decimal places of which the first 152 are correct.

== Physiology and medicine ==
- Platelets are first described from microscopic observation by George Gulliver.

== Technology ==
- February – H. Fox Talbot obtains a patent in the United Kingdom for the calotype process in photography.
- April 16 – Loring Coes patents the screw type wrench commonly known as the monkey wrench in the United States.
- April 24 – Squire Whipple patents the iron bowstring arch through truss bridge in the United States.
- Draughtsman William Howe and pattern-maker William Williams of Robert Stephenson and Company in Newcastle upon Tyne originate Stephenson valve gear for the steam locomotive.
- Joseph Whitworth introduces the British Standard Whitworth system of screw threads in his paper On a Uniform System of Screw Threads.
- American artist John G. Rand invents the collapsible zinc oil paint tube, marketed by Winsor & Newton of London.

== Awards ==
- Copley Medal: Georg Ohm
- Wollaston Medal: Adolphe Theodore Brongniart

== Births ==
- January 29 – Henry Morton Stanley (died 1904), explorer, journalist.
- February 2 – François-Alphonse Forel (died 1912), pioneer in the study of lakes.
- February 4 – Clément Ader (died 1926), engineer and inventor, airplane pioneer.
- February 24 – Carl Gräbe, (died 1927) chemist.
- March 6 – Alfred Cornu (died 1902), physicist.
- August 4 – W. H. Hudson (died 1922), naturalist.
- August 25 – Emil Theodor Kocher (died 1917), 1909 winner of the Nobel Prize in Physiology or Medicine
- October 12 – Joseph O'Dwyer (died 1898), physician
- October 26 – Theodor von Oppolzer (died 1886), astronomer.
- November 3 – Eugen Warming (died 1924), botanist and founder of ecology.
- December 29 – Rosalie Fougelberg (d. 1911), Swedish dentist

== Deaths ==
- April 22 – Charles Barbier, inventor of a method of writing for the blind that was the inspiration for Braille.
- May 16 – Marie Boivin, French midwife, inventor and obstetrics writer (born 1773)
- May 31 – George Green (born 1793), English mathematician.
- August 18 – Louis de Freycinet (born 1779), explored coastal regions of Western Australia.
- September 9 – Augustin Pyramus de Candolle (born 1778), Swiss botanist.
- October 28 – Johan August Arfwedson (born 1792), Swedish chemist.
