= 1850 in science =

List of years in science	(table)
- … 1840; 1841; 1842; 1843; 1844; 1845; 1846; 1847; 1848; 1849; 1850; 1851; 1852; 1853; 1854; 1855; 1856; 1857; 1858; 1859; 1860 …
- Art; Archaeology; Architecture; Literature; Music; Philosophy; Science; +...

The year 1850 in science and technology involved some significant events, listed below.

== Biology ==
- May 25 – The young Hippopotamous Obaysch arrives at London Zoo from Egypt, the first seen in Europe since Roman times.
- Rewilding of Ascension Island begins.

== Chemistry ==
- April 15 – Capt. John William Reynolds presents his discovery of propylene.
- October 17 – James Young patents a method of distilling kerosene from coal.
- Rev. Levi Hill invents a color photography process, "helicromy", capable of basic rendering of reds and blues.

== Mathematics ==
- July 2 – William Thomson communicates Stokes' theorem to George Stokes. Stokes presents a paper on the numerical calculation of a class of definite integrals and infinite series.
- Thomas Kirkman proposes Kirkman's schoolgirl problem.
- Victor Puiseux distinguishes between poles and branch points and introduces the concept of essential singular points.
- J. J. Sylvester originates the term matrix in mathematics.

== Medicine ==
- March – Dr Benjamin Guy Babington founds the London Epidemiological Society.
- Central Criminal Lunatic Asylum for Ireland opened in Dundrum, Dublin, the first secure hospital in Europe.

== Meteorology ==
- April 3 – British Meteorological Society founded.

== Physics ==
- May – John Tyndall and Hermann Knoblauch publish a report on "The magneto-optic properties of crystals, and the relation of magnetism and diamagnetism to molecular arrangement".
- Rudolf Clausius publishes his paper on the mechanical theory of heat, which first states the basic ideas of the second law of thermodynamics.
- Hippolyte Fizeau and E. Gounelle measure the speed of electricity.
- Léon Foucault demonstrates the greater speed of light in air than in water, and establishes that the speed of light in different media is inverse to the refractive indices of the media, using a rotating mirror.
- George Stokes publishes a paper on the effects of the internal friction of fluids on the motion of pendulums.

== Technology ==
- April 15 – Angers Bridge, a French suspension bridge, collapses in a storm with around 480 soldiers marching across it; about 226 are killed.
- July 14 – John Gorrie makes the first public demonstration of his ice-making machine, in Apalachicola, Florida.
- Completion of the Bibliothèque Sainte-Geneviève in Paris to the design of Henri Labrouste, the first major public building with an exposed cast-iron frame.

== Institutions ==
- Astronomer Maria Mitchell becomes the first woman member of the American Association for the Advancement of Science.
- The University of Oxford in England establishes an Honour School (i.e. an undergraduate course) in Natural Science.

== Awards ==
- Copley Medal: Peter Andreas Hansen
- Wollaston Medal: William Hopkins

== Births ==
- January 5 – Sidney Browne (died 1941), British military nurse.
- January 15 (January 3 O.S.) – Sofia Kovalevskaya (died 1891), Russian-born mathematician.
- January 24 – Hermann Ebbinghaus (died 1909), German psychologist.
- January 29 – Edmond Nocard (died 1903), French veterinarian and microbiologist.
- February 15 – Sophie Bryant (died 1922), Irish-born mathematician and educationalist.
- March 31 – Charles Walcott (died 1927), American paleontologist.
- April 10 – Mary Emilie Holmes (died 1906), American geologist and educator.
- May 18 – Oliver Heaviside (died 1925), English physicist.
- May 21 – Giuseppe Mercalli (died 1914), Italian volcanologist.
- May 23 – George Claridge Druce (died 1932), English botanist.
- June 6 – Karl Ferdinand Braun (died 1918), German-born physicist.
- August 30 – Charles Richet (died 1935), French physiologist, Nobel Prize winner.

== Deaths ==
- March 27 – Wilhelm Beer (born 1797), German astronomer.
- April 9 – William Prout (born 1785), English chemist.
- May 10 – Joseph Louis Gay-Lussac (born 1778), French chemist and physicist.
- July 12 – Robert Stevenson (born 1772), Scottish lighthouse engineer.
- August 5 – Mary Anne Whitby (born 1783), English scientist.
- December 4 – William Sturgeon (born 1783), English inventor.
