= 1917 in archaeology =

Below are notable events in archaeology that occurred in 1917.

== Explorations ==
- Thomas Gann makes the first detailed description of Maya ruins at Lamanai in British Honduras.

== Excavations ==
- Max Uhle discovers 12 Chinchorro mummies at Morro I, Arica, Chile.
- Religious artefacts discovered beneath the Seven-story Stone Pagoda in Tappyeong-ri, Chungju, Korea.

== Publications ==
- Wang Guowei reconstructs a complete Shang dynasty royal genealogy based on the translation of oracle bones from the site of Yinxu.

== Births ==
- 14 October: Geoffrey Bibby, English-born archaeologist (d. 2001)
- 15 October: Ralph Solecki, American archeologist (d. 2019)
- 28 October: Honor Frost, Cyprus-born underwater archaeologist (d. 2010)
- 31 January: Sinclair Hood, British classical archaeologist (d. 2021)

== Deaths ==
- 15 October: Maxime Collignon, French Classical archaeologist (b. 1849)
- 27 October: Worthington George Smith, English illustrator, palaeolithic archaeologist and mycologist (b. 1835)
- 22 November: Teoberto Maler, German explorer, archaeologist and writer of accounts of the ruins of the Maya civilization (b. 1842)
