= 1998 in science =

The year 1998 in science and technology involved many events, some of which are included below.

== Astronomy and space exploration ==
- January–September – Cosmologists from the Supernova Cosmology Project led by Saul Perlmutter and the High-z Supernova Search Team led by Adam Riess and Brian Schmidt publish evidence that the expansion rate of the universe is increasing.
- January 6 – The Lunar Prospector spacecraft is launched into orbit around the Moon and later finds evidence for frozen water on the Moon's surface.
- February 26 – Total solar eclipse
- March 2 – Data sent from the Galileo space probe indicates that Jupiter's moon Europa has a liquid ocean under a thick crust of ice.
- March 5 – NASA announces that the Clementine probe orbiting the Moon has found enough water in polar craters to support a human colony and rocket-fuelling station.
- March 13 – Penumbral lunar eclipse
- July 5 – Japan launches a probe to Mars, and thus joins the United States and Russia as a space-exploring nation.
- August 8 – Penumbral lunar eclipse
- August 22 – Annular solar eclipse
- September 6 – Penumbral lunar eclipse
- October 29 – Space Shuttle Discovery blasts-off with 77-year-old John Glenn on board, making him the oldest person to go into space up to that time. He became the first American to orbit Earth on February 20, 1962.
- November 20 – Zarya, the first module of the International Space Station, is launched.
- The first of four 8.4 m reflecting telescopes opens in the Very Large Telescope program of the European Southern Observatory at Cerro Paranal in Chile.

== Botany ==
- The Angiosperm Phylogeny Group publishes the first version of the APG System of plant classification.

== Climatology ==
- April 23 – The hockey stick graph (global temperature) comes to public attention.

== Computer science ==
- February 10 – XML is published as a recommendation of the W3C.
- June 2 – The CIH virus is discovered in Taiwan.
- August 15 – Apple releases the iMac.
- September 4 – Google, Inc. is founded in Menlo Park, California, by Stanford University PhD candidates Larry Page and Sergey Brin to promote their web search engine.
- November 7 – Sega release the Dreamcast, the first sixth generation home video game console, in Japan.
- The first working 2-qubit nuclear magnetic resonance computer is demonstrated at the University of California, Berkeley.
- Tiger Electronics launch the Furby electronic toy, the first domestic robot.

== Geology ==
- February 4 – The 5.9 M_{w} Afghanistan earthquake shakes the Takhar Province with a maximum Mercalli intensity of VII (Very strong). With 2,323 killed, and 818 injured, damage is considered extreme.
- March 14 – An earthquake measuring 6.9 on the Richter scale hits southeastern Iran.
- May 30 – A 6.6 magnitude earthquake hits northern Afghanistan killing up to 5,000.
- July 17 – The 7.0 M_{w} Papua New Guinea earthquake shakes the region near Aitape with a maximum Mercalli intensity of VIII (Severe). This submarine earthquake triggered a landslide that caused a destructive tsunami, leaving 2,183–2,700 dead and thousands injured.

== Mathematics ==
- Luca Cardelli and Andrew D. Gordon develop ambient calculus.
- Thomas Callister Hales (almost certainly) proves the Kepler conjecture.

== Paleontology ==
- September 11 – First portion of upper body (an upper arm bone, followed later by the skull) of "Little Foot" (Stw 573), a nearly complete young female Australopithecus fossil skeleton capable of walking upright is found in the cave system of Sterkfontein, South Africa eventually dated at around 3.67 million years BP.

== Physics ==
- January 1 – Argentinian physicist Juan Maldacena publishes a landmark paper initiating the study of AdS/CFT correspondence, which links string theory and quantum gravity.
- May 11 & 13 – Nuclear testing: The Pokhran-II: India detonates the five nuclear devices in Pokhran Test Range, an Indian Army base.
- May 28 – Nuclear testing: The Chagai-I: In response to India, Pakistan conducts five underground and simultaneous nuclear weapon-testing experiments in the Chagai Hills, thus becoming the first nuclear weapon state in the Muslim world and the seventh in the world.
- May 30 – Nuclear testing: The Chagai-II: As part of a tit-for-tat policy, a final plutonium implosion test is carried out in the Kharan Desert.
- June 5 – Experimental proof is obtained that neutrinos have mass.

== Physiology and medicine ==
- January 14 – Researchers in Dallas, Texas, present findings about an enzyme that slows aging and cell death (apoptosis).
- February 19 – RNA interference first elucidated in the nematode Caenorhabditis elegans.
- February 28 – Andrew Wakefield publishes a case series (subsequently partially retracted) in The Lancet of twelve children with gastroenterological and autistic spectrum disorders believed to have first presented soon after receipt of the MMR vaccine.
- March 27 – The Food and Drug Administration approves Viagra for use as a treatment for erectile dysfunction, the first pill to be approved for this condition in the United States.
- May – Friedrich-Wilhelm Mohr performs the first robotically assisted coronary artery bypass surgery, at the Leipzig Heart Centre in Germany using the da Vinci Surgical System; later in the year, Ralph Damiano performs on 17 patients in Pennsylvania.
- July 17 – Biologists report in the journal Science how they sequenced the genome of the bacterium that causes syphilis, Treponema pallidum.
- August – Edinburgh Modular Arm System, the world's first bionic arm, is fitted.
- September 23 – The world's first medically successful hand transplantation is carried out by a team of surgeons in France.
- December 11
  - Bruce Beutler and colleagues publish their discovery that Toll-like receptor 4 functions as a lipopolysaccharide sensing receptor.
  - The nematode Caenorhabditis elegans becomes the first multicellular organism to have its whole genome sequencing published.
- Fred Gage and Peter Eriksson discover and announce neurogenesis in the adult human hippocampus.

== Technology ==
- April 5 – In Japan, the Akashi Kaikyō Bridge linking Shikoku with Honshū, at a cost of about US$3.8 billion, opens to traffic, becoming the longest-span suspension bridge in the world.
- August 24 – The first experiments with an RFID implant carried out by Kevin Warwick in the UK.

== Institutions ==
- Susan Greenfield appointed Director of the Royal Institution of Great Britain.
- Café Scientifique first organized in the UK.

== Publications ==
- Jacques Heyman – Structural Analysis: A Historical Approach (Cambridge University Press)

== Awards ==
- Fields Medal in mathematics: Richard Ewen Borcherds, William Timothy Gowers, Maxim Kontsevich and Curtis T. McMullen
- Nobel Prize
  - Physics – Robert B. Laughlin, Horst L. Störmer, Daniel C. Tsui
  - Chemistry – Walter Kohn, John Pople
  - Medicine – Robert F. Furchgott, Louis J. Ignarro, Ferid Murad
- Turing Award: Jim Gray
- Wollaston Medal for Geology: Karl Karekin Turekian

== Deaths ==
- March 13 – Hans von Ohain (b. 1911), German aeronautical engineer.
- March 15 – Benjamin Spock (b. 1903), American pediatrician.
- March 16 – Sir Derek Barton (b. 1918), English-born organic chemist, Nobel laureate.
- May 9 – R. J. G. Savage (b. 1927), British palaeontologist.
- May 14 – Marjory Stoneman Douglas (b. 1890), American conservationist.
- May 22 – José Enrique Moyal (b. 1910), Jerusalem-born mathematical physicist.
- May 31 – Michio Suzuki (b. 1926), Japanese mathematician.
- July 3 – Danielle Bunten Berry, also known as Dan Bunten (b. 1949), American software developer.
- July 12 – Arkady Ostashev (b. 1925), Soviet, Russian scientist, participant in the launch of the first artificial Earth satellite and the first cosmonaut, Candidate of Technical Sciences, Docent, laureate of the Lenin and state prizes.
- July 14 – Miroslav Holub (b. 1923), Czech immunologist and poet.
- July 21 – Alan Shepard (b. 1923), American astronaut.
- August 4 – Yury Artyukhin (b. 1930), Soviet Russian cosmonaut.
- August 26 – Frederick Reines (b. 1918), American physicist, Nobel laureate.
- October 10 – Konstantin Petrzhak (b. 1907), Soviet Russian physicist.
- October 28 – Tommy Flowers (b. 1905), English computer engineer.
- November 12 – Sally Shlaer (b. 1938), US mathematician and engineer
- November 24 – Nicholas Kurti (b. 1908), Hungarian-born physicist.
- December 5 – Hazel Bishop (b. 1906), American cosmetic chemist.
- December 7 – Martin Rodbell (b. 1925), American biochemist and molecular endocrinologist, Nobel laureate.
- December 17 – Claudia Benton (b. c.1959), American pediatric neurologist (murdered).
- December 18 – Lev Dyomin (b. 1926), Soviet Russian cosmonaut.
- December 20 – Sir Alan Hodgkin (b. 1914), English physiologist, Nobel laureate.
- December 28 – Robert Rosen (b. 1934), American theoretical biologist.
