= 1778 in science =

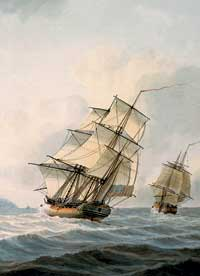

The year 1778 in science and technology involved some significant events.

== Astronomy ==
- Lagrange delivers his treatise on cometary perturbations to the Académie française.

== Biology ==
- Wilhelm Friedrich von Gleichen develops a process of staining micro-organisms with indigo and carmine (Abhandlung über die Saamen - und Infusionsthierchen, und über die Erzeugung, nebst mikroskopischen Beobachtungen des Saamens der Thiere in verschiedenen Infusionen, "Treatise on seed and infusoria, and their production, along with microscopic observations of the semen of animals in different suspensions").

== Chemistry ==
- Molybdenum discovered by Carl Wilhelm Scheele.
- Antoine Lavoisier, considered "The father of modern chemistry", recognizes and names oxygen, and recognizes its importance and role in combustion.

== Earth sciences and exploration ==
- January 18 – On his third voyage, Captain James Cook, with ships HMS Resolution and HMS Discovery, becomes the first European to view the Hawaiian Islands in the Pacific Ocean.
- March 6 – October 24 – Captain Cook explores and maps the Pacific Northwest coast of North America from Cape Foulweather (Oregon) to the Bering Strait.
- James Rennell publishes a chart and memoir of the Agulhas Current, one of the first contributions to scientific oceanography.

== Medicine ==
- John Hunter publishes The Natural History of the Human Teeth.
- Samuel-Auguste Tissot begins publication of Traité des nerfs et de leurs maladies, including a classical account of migraine.
- Samuel Thomas von Sömmerring describes the organization of the cranial nerves.
- Publication of Collection of observations on diseases and epidemic constitutions (Collection d’observations sur les maladies et constitutions épidémiques), by Louis Lépecq de La Clôture, work consisting mainly of a 15-year observation of the relations between climate, geography and pathologies in Normandy.

== Technology ==
- Joseph Bramah patents an improved design of flush toilet in London.
- The brothers Hans Ulrich and Johannes Grubenmann complete a bridge across the Limmat at Wettingen in Switzerland, a 60 m span which is the first known use of a true arch in a timber bridge.

== Zoology ==
- Petrus Camper publishes On the Points of Similarity between the Human Species, Quadrupeds, Birds, and Fish; with Rules for Drawing, founded on this Similarity, an early work of comparative anatomy.
- Johan Christian Fabricius publishes his Philosophia Entomologica in Hamburg.

== Awards ==
- Copley Medal: Charles Hutton

== Births ==
- February 4 – A. P. de Candolle, Swiss botanist (died 1841)
- May 18 – Andrew Ure, Scottish industrial chemist and encyclopaedist (died 1857)
- July 12 – Maria Dalle Donne, Bolognese physician (died 1842)
- December 6 – Joseph Louis Gay-Lussac, French chemist and physicist (died 1850)
- December 17 – Humphry Davy, English chemist (died 1829)
- December 25 (bapt.) – Joseph Aspdin, English inventor (died 1855)
- Probable date – Anna Maria Walker, Scottish botanist (died 1852)

== Deaths ==
- January 10 – Carl Linnaeus, Swedish botanist, first to develop standard nomenclature for naming species (born 1707)
- February 20 – Laura Bassi, Italian scientist (born 1711)
- March 7 – Charles De Geer, Swedish industrialist and entomologist (born 1720)
- May 6 – Jean Baptiste Christophore Fusée Aublet, French pharmacist and botanist (born 1720)
