= 2004 in science =

The year 2004 in science and technology involved some significant events.

== Anthropology ==
- October 27 – Remains of a previously unknown species of human is discovered in Indonesia. Named Homo floresiensis, the hominin is a dwarfed version that lived 18,000 years ago on the island of Flores.

== Astronomy ==
- March 15 – Astronomers announce the discovery last year of trans-Neptunian object 90377 Sedna, one of the most distant objects in the Solar System.
- April 19 – Partial solar eclipse.
- May 18 – Scientists using the Chandra X-ray Observatory announced their findings that supports the notion that the expansion of the Universe is accelerating.
- July 1 (01:12–02:48 UTC) – Saturn orbit insertion of Cassini–Huygens.
- June 8 – Transit of Venus across the Sun.
- September 13 – Astronomers from the European Southern Observatory (ESO) announce images that appear to show a planet orbiting a brown dwarf about 230 light-years away. The system is believed to be only around 8 million years old.
- October 14 – Partial solar eclipse
- November 20 – Launch of the Swift satellite to investigate gamma-ray bursts (GRB) and perform an X-ray all sky survey.
- December 27 – A flare of radiation from an explosion on the super-magnetic neutron star (Magnetar) SGR 1806-20 reaches Earth – astronomers later calculate that it is the largest explosion observed in the Milky Way galaxy for 400 years.

== Biology ==
- April 22 – Trees have a theoretical maximum height of 130 m (426 ft) before gravity restricts their growth, according to a study published in Nature.
- June 4 - Biologists at Washington University in St. Louis discovered how strep bacteria release harmful proteins to infect human tissue.
- July 30 – Marine biologists from the Monterey Bay Aquarium Research Institute announce in the journal Science the discovery of the genus Osedax, deep sea worms that feed on lipids in decaying whale carcasses.

== Computing ==
- February 4 – Facebook launches: Mark Zuckerberg launches "TheFacebook" as a social networking website for Harvard University students.
- April 1 – Gmail launches.
- November 9 – Firefox launches.

== Earth sciences ==
- September 28 – A long-awaited earthquake strikes Parkfield, California, the most closely monitored earthquake zone in the world. The earthquake, which had been expected to have occurred by the late 1980s, strikes at a magnitude 6.0. The network of instruments that had been installed in the region make this the most well-recorded earthquake in history.
- December 26 – Indian Ocean earthquake and tsunami.

== Mathematics ==
- Michael Aschbacher and Stephen D. Smith publish their work on quasithin groups, filling the last (known) gap in the classification of finite simple groups.

== Paleontology ==
- January – A 428 million-year-old fossil Pneumodesmus found in Scotland is identified as the world's oldest known creature to have lived on land.
- Summer – A team led by Neil Shubin discover fossils of the sarcopterygian Tiktaalik on Ellesmere Island in Nunavut, Canada, significant in the evolution of tetrapods.

== Physics ==
- January 14 – Physicists from Pennsylvania State University produce the first solid Bose–Einstein condensate.
- January – A team from the JILA laboratory in Boulder, Colorado announce the creation of a fermionic condensate, the first such condensate made from atoms rather than molecules.
- February 3 – Russian and American physicists produce results that indicate the discovery of elements 113 and 115.
- March 22 – A team from Australia, Russia and Greece announce a new material, made from a nano-foam of carbon that has the lowest density ever reported for a solid.
- April 20 – NASA launches Gravity Probe B in an effort to test Einstein's general theory of relativity.
- May 19 – A team of European scientists produces the first Tonks–Girardeau gas.
- September 24 – Physicists from the Université Joseph Fourier and the Institut Laue–Langevin in Grenoble, France announce the discovery of a solution (a-cyclodextrine, water, and 4-methylpyridine) that changes from liquid to solid when heated, and melts again when cooled down.
- October 22 – Andre Geim and Konstantin Novoselov publish their rediscovery, isolation and characterization of graphene at the University of Manchester in England.

== Technology ==
- March 27 – NASA succeeds in a second attempt to fly its X-43A experimental airplane from the Hyper-X project, attaining speeds in excess of Mach 7, the fastest free flying air-breathing hypersonic flight.
- April 30 – Scientists from the University of California, Irvine announce the first high-speed transistor made from a carbon nanotube, operating at microwave frequencies.

== Space exploration ==
- January 2 – NASA's Stardust space probe flies by comet 81P/Wild and collects particle samples from its coma.
- January 4 – NASA's Mars Exploration Rover Mission Spirit (MER-A), the first of two Mars rovers, lands successfully on Mars in the crater Gusev (Columbia Memorial Station) at 04:35 SCET.
- January 25 – NASA's Mars Exploration Rover Mission Opportunity (MER-B), the second Mars rover, lands successfully on Mars in the Meridiani Planum at 05:05 SCET.
- March 2
  - NASA report that the area where their Mars rover Opportunity touched down shows unmistakable signs of contact with water in the geological past.
  - The European Space Agency's Rosetta mission launches, aiming to land on Comet Churyumov–Gerasimenko in 2014.
- March 4 – NASA's Spirit finds evidence of past contact with water in volcanic rocks on Mars.
- April 1 – The Genesis probe closes and seals its particle collection instrument, and begins to return to Earth.
- June 11 – Cassini–Huygens, the NASA/ESA mission to Saturn, makes a flyby of one of Saturn's small outer moons, Phoebe.
- June 21 – SpaceShipOne, the first civilian space ship is launched in California, reaching an altitude of 100 km (62 mi), just passing the edge of space.
- July 1 – The Cassini-Huygens space probe arrives at Saturn and begins its nominal 4-year mission after successfully reaching orbit.
- August 2 – NASA successfully launches the MESSENGER probe on its 5-year trip to Mercury.
- September 8 – The Genesis spacecraft returns to Earth with captured solar wind particles, but crash-lands because of a failure to deploy any parachute.
- October 4 – SpaceShipOne wins the Ansari X Prize after reaching an altitude of over 100 km (62 mi) for the second time in less than five days.
- November 15 – The SMART-1 space probe reaches orbit around the Moon. It is the first European space mission to do so.
- December 25 – The Cassini probe successfully drops the Huygens probe, sending it onto a trip to land on Saturn's moon Titan.

== Awards ==
- Nobel Prize
  - Nobel Prize in Physiology or Medicine: Linda B. Buck and Richard Axel
  - Nobel Prize in Physics: David J. Gross, H. David Politzer and Frank Wilczek
  - Nobel Prize in Chemistry: Aaron Ciechanover, Avram Hershko and Irwin Rose
- Abel Prize in Mathematics: Michael F. Atiyah and Isadore M. Singer
- Millennium Technology Prize (inaugural year): World Wide Web inventor Tim Berners-Lee
- Descartes Prize for outstanding cross-border research
  - Mitochondrial Biogenesis, Ageing and Disease project (co-ordinator Howard Trevor Jacobs)
  - Long Distance Photonic Quantum Communication project (co-ordinator Anders Karlsson)

== Appointments ==
- February 12 – Arden Bement, acting director of the U.S.A.'s National Science Foundation.
- August 26 – Neurobiologist Susan Hockfield is appointed as President of MIT.
- November 19 – Particle physicist Piermaria Oddone is appointed to succeed Michael Witherell as director of Fermilab (from July 1, 2005).

== Deaths ==
- January 6 – Thomas Stockham (b. 1933), American electrical engineer and inventor.
- January 12 – Olga Ladyzhenskaya (b. 1922), Soviet mathematician.
- February 6 – Humphry Osmond (b. 1917), English-born psychiatrist.
- February 21 – John D. Hoffman (b. 1922), American nuclear chemist.
- March 15
  - Bill Pickering (b. 1910), New Zealand-born head of NASA's Jet Propulsion Laboratory.
  - Sir John Pople (b. 1925), British Nobel Prize-winning chemist.
- April 6 – Biswa Ranjan Nag (b. 1932), Indian physicist.
- April 19 – John Maynard Smith (b. 1920), English evolutionary biologist and geneticist.
- May 27 – Mikhail Postnikov (b. 1927), Soviet mathematician, known for his work in algebraic and differential topology.
- June 8 – David Mervyn Blow (b. 1931), English biophysicist.
- July 3 – Andriyan Nikolayev (b. 1929), cosmonaut.
- July 28 – Francis Crick (b. 1916), American Nobel laureate in Physiology for discovering the double helix structure for DNA.
- August 12 – John Clark (b. 1951), English-born molecular biologist, head of the Roslin Institute and part of the team that cloned Dolly the Sheep.
- August 15 – Sune K. Bergström (b. 1916), Swedish biochemist, winner of the 1982 Nobel Prize for Medicine.
- August 31 – Fred Whipple (b. 1906), American astronomer who coined the term "dirty snowball" to explain the nature of comets.
- October 5 – Maurice Wilkins (b. 1916), New Zealand-born British Nobel laureate in Physiology for discovering the double helix structure for DNA using X-ray diffraction.
- October 19 – Lewis Urry (b. 1927), Canadian inventor of the long-lasting alkaline battery.
- October 21 – Magdalena K. P. Smith Meyer (b. 1931), South African acarologist.
- November 18 – Robert Bacher (b. 1905), American nuclear physicist and one of the leaders of the Manhattan Project, Professor and Provost of the California Institute of Technology.
- November 20 – Ancel Keys (b. 1904), American nutritionist.
- December 26 – Frank Pantridge (b. 1916), Northern Irish cardiologist.
- December 29 – Julius Axelrod, (b. 1912), American biochemist, Nobel Prize in Physiology for work with catecholamine neurotransmitters.
