= 1899 in science =

The year 1899 in science involved some significant events, listed below.

== Astronomy and space sciences ==
- March 18 – Phoebe, the ninth-known moon of the planet Saturn is discovered by U.S. astronomer William H. Pickering from analysis of photographic plates made by a Peruvian observatory seven months earlier, the first discovery of a satellite photographically.
- April 21 – The nova V606 Aquilae is first observed from Earth as seen within the constellation Aquila. It fades within six months.
- October 19 – 17-year-old Robert H. Goddard in Worcester, Massachusetts, receives his inspiration to develop a rocket capable of reaching outer space, after viewing his yard from high in a tree and imagining "how wonderful it would be to make some device which had even the possibility of ascending to Mars, and how it would look on a small scale, if sent up from the meadow at my feet."
- December 2 – During the new moon, a near-grand conjunction of the classical planets and several binocular Solar System bodies occur. The Sun, Moon, Mercury, Mars and Saturn are all within 15° of each other, with Venus 5° ahead of this conjunction and Jupiter 15° behind. Accompanying the classical planets in this grand conjunction are Uranus (technically visible unaided in pollution-free skies), Ceres and Pallas.
- The 80 cm refracting telescope is completed at Potsdam Observatory.

== Biology ==
- May 1 – The National Trust in the United Kingdom acquires its first part of Wicken Fen, making it the country's oldest wetland nature reserve.
- November 8 – The New York Zoological Society opens the Bronx Zoological Park to the public in New York City under the direction of William Temple Hornaday.

== Chemistry ==
- Actinium is discovered by André-Louis Debierne.
- International Committee on Atomic Weights established.

== Computing ==
- December 31 – Retrospectively, day zero for dates in Microsoft Excel. This is to ensure backwards compatibility with Lotus 1-2-3, which had a bug misinterpreting 1900 as a leap year.

== Exploration ==
- January 23 – The British Southern Cross Expedition crosses the Antarctic Circle.
- July 31 – The Southern Cross Expedition and explorer Carsten Borchgrevink first chart Duke of York Island.

== Mathematics ==
- June 17 – David Hilbert creates the modern concept of geometry, with the publication of his book Grundlagen der Geometrie at Göttingen, proposing a formal set, Hilbert's axioms, to replace Euclid's elements.
- Élie Cartan first defines the exterior derivative in its modern form.
- Georg Alexander Pick publishes his theorem on the area of simple polygons.

== Medicine ==
- Bubonic plague enters Brazil through the seaport of Santos.
- March 6 – Felix Hoffmann patents Aspirin and Bayer registers its name as a trademark in Berlin.
- July 1 – The International Council of Nurses is founded in London, at a meeting of the Matron's Council of Great Britain and Ireland.
- October 2 – The London School of Hygiene & Tropical Medicine is established by Patrick Manson at the Albert Dock Seamen's Hospital.

== Paleontology ==
- July 4 – The most famous skeleton of a dinosaur ever found intact, a Diplodocus, is discovered at the Sheep Creek Quarry in the western United States near Medicine Bow, Wyoming. The expedition team, financed by Andrew Carnegie for the Carnegie Museum of Natural History in Pittsburgh and led by William Harlow Reed, bestows the name "Dippy" on the Diplodocus carnegii, which becomes well known after Carnegie has plaster cast replicas made for donation to museums all over the world. These dinosaurs are estimated to have roamed in North America more than 152,000,000 years ago.

== Physics ==
- March 3 – Guglielmo Marconi conducts radio beacon experiments on Salisbury Plain in England and notices that radio waves are being reflected back to the transmitter by objects they encounter, one of the early steps in the potential for developing radar.
- May 8 – Ernest Rutherford publishes his discovery of two different types of radiation, alpha rays and beta rays.
- May 20 – The American Physical Society is founded at a meeting at Columbia University by 36 physicists, with a mission "to advance and diffuse the knowledge of physics."
- Henri Becquerel discovers that radiation from uranium consists of charged particles and can be deflected by magnetic fields.
- Max Planck introduces the Planck constant.
- Hertha Ayrton becomes the first woman to read her own paper (on the electric arc) before the Institution of Electrical Engineers in London, of which soon afterwards she is elected the first female member.

== Psychology ==
- Sigmund Freud's Die Traumdeutung (The Interpretation of Dreams) is published (dated 1900).

== Technology ==
- January 26 – German inventor Karl Ferdinand Braun (who will in 1909 share the Nobel Prize in Physics with Marconi) receives British Patent No. 1899-1862 for his wireless radio invention "Telegraphy without directly connected wire".
- February 14 – Voting machines are approved by the U.S. Congress for use in federal elections.
- March 11 – Waldemar Jungner files the patent application for the first alkaline battery and receives Swedish patent number 11132.
- March 22 – London inventor Edward Raymond Turner applies for a patent for his additive colour process for colour motion picture film.
- March 27 – Guglielmo Marconi successfully transmits a radio signal across the English Channel.
- May 4 – German-born inventor John Matthias Stroh applies for a patent for the 'Stroh violin', a stringed musical instrument with an amplifying horn attached.
- May 26 – The guns of British cruiser HMS Scylla, commanded by Captain Percy Scott, hit their targets 56 out of 70 times after Scott and his crew solve the problem of aiming a ship cannon on rolling seas.
- June 27 – A patent for a form of paperclip is applied for by Johan Vaaler, a Norwegian inventor, although it is never put into production.
- July 18 – The patent for the first sofa bed (a foldable bed frame that can be stored under the cushions of a couch) is taken out by African American inventor Leonard C. Bailey.
- August 23 – The first ship-to-shore test of a wireless radio transmission is made from the U.S. lightship LV 70 with the sending of Morse code signals to a receiving station near San Francisco. The tests are made over 17 days.
- September 19 – A patent for the first water meter is granted to Edwin Ford, the water superintendent for Hartford City, Indiana.
- October 26 – Indirect fire, a shooting technique based on calculating azimuth and inclination to aim a weapon at an enemy that cannot be hit by direct fire, is used for the first time in battle. British gunners in the Second Boer War, using the techniques developed by Russian Lieutenant Colonel K. G. Guk, fire a cannon on a high trajectory toward the Boer Army, with the objective of having the shell coming down on the enemy.
- November 7 – The flash-lamp, the first to use electricity to ignite photographers' magnesium flash powder, is awarded as U.S. patent 636,492 to Joshua Lionel Cohen. While flash powder had been in use since 1887, the ignition was more dangerous because it had to be performed manually.
- The first modern step-type escalator is designed by Charles Seeberger in the United States.
- Hugo Lenz first demonstrates Lenz poppet valve gear, for stationary steam engines.
- Ernest Godward patents the spiral hairpin in New Zealand.
- The world's first successful self-propelled steam fire engine, the 'Fire King', is built by Merryweather & Sons in London and dispatched to Port Louis on Mauritius.

== Events ==
- January 29 – A lawyer for the estate of John W. Keely, an inventor who had persuaded investors in his Keely Motor Company that an automobile could be created that would operate from Keely's "induction resonance motion motor" which had achieved perpetual motion, reveals that the late Mr. Keely's motor has been a fraud, and that the widow knew nothing of it.

== Awards ==
- Copley Medal: Lord Rayleigh
- Wollaston Medal for Geology: Charles Lapworth

== Births ==
- January 12 – Paul Hermann Müller (died 1965), Swiss chemist, winner of the Nobel Prize in Physiology or Medicine in 1948.
- February 19 – Ehrenfried Pfeiffer (died 1961), German soil scientist.
- February 27 – Charles Best (died 1978), American-born medical scientist.
- April 4 – Hillel Oppenheimer (died 1971), German-born Israeli botanist.
- April 11 – Percy Lavon Julian (died 1975), African American research chemist.
- April 28 – Mary Loveless, née Hewitt (died 1991), American immunologist.
- May 8 – Charles Illingworth (died 1991), English surgeon.
- May 14 – Charlotte Auerbach (died 1994), German-Jewish Scottish geneticist and zoologist.
- July 3 – Ludwig Guttmann (died 1980), German-born neurologist and pioneer of paralympic games.
- July 7 – Anna Baetjer (died 1984), American toxicologist.
- July 26 – Bill Hamilton (died 1978), New Zealand mechanical engineer.
- September 3 – Frank Macfarlane Burnet (died 1985), Australian virologist best known for his contributions to immunology, winner of the Nobel Prize in Physiology or Medicine in 1960.
- September 29 – László Bíró (died 1985), Hungarian inventor.
- October 5 – Elda Emma Anderson (died 1961), American nuclear and health physicist.
- October 18 – Janet Vaughan (died 1993), English physiologist.
- October 27 – Nikolay Dollezhal (died 2000), a key figure in Soviet atomic bomb project and chief designer of nuclear reactors.
- November 10 – Helen Porter (died 1987), English plant physiologist.

== Deaths ==
- January 4 – Henry Alleyne Nicholson (born 1844), British palaeontologist and zoologist.
- February 18 – Sophus Lie (born 1842), Norwegian mathematician.
- March 18 – Othniel Charles Marsh (born 1831), American paleontologist.
- July 16 – Margaretta Riley (born 1804), British botanist.
- August 9 – Edward Frankland (born 1825), English chemist.
- August 16 – Robert Bunsen (born 1811), German chemist, perfector of the bunsen burner.
- October 28 – Ottmar Mergenthaler (born 1854), German American inventor.
