= 2021 in archaeology =

This page lists major events of 2021 in archaeology.

== Excavations ==
- 29 January – The Herculaneum Conservation Project announces it will begin excavations of a beach where 300 skeletons of victims from the eruption of Mt Vesuvius in 79 CE have been discovered.
- 30 January – Excavation of an early Anglo-Saxon cemetery site in west Cambridge, England, is reported.
- 4 February – Preliminary excavations on the intended site of the Stonehenge road tunnel in England have uncovered Bronze Age graves and neolithic pottery among other features, it is reported.
- 30 April – A World War II 'Buffalo' Landing Vehicle Tracked is excavated near Crowland in England.
- 19 May – Decapitated bodies found at Knobb's Farm, Somersham, Cambridgeshire in eastern England, are victims of Roman executions in the 3rd century.

== Finds ==
=== January ===
- 2 – The Instituto Nacional de Antropología e Historia (INAH) confirms the finding of a two-meter sculpture of a prehispanic woman, possibly representing a government official, in a previously known archaeological site in Hidalgo Amajac, Álamo, Veracruz, Mexico.
- 3 – Archaeologists announce the discovery of the ruins of a 2500-year-old temple of Aphrodite from the 5th century BC, a terracotta female head and an inscription in the Urla-Çeşme peninsula.
- 8 – Archaeologists from Israel Antiquities Authority announce the discovery of a tombstone dating back 1,400 years with a Greek inscription by an employee of the Parks and Nature Authority at Nitzana National Park in the Negev desert.
- 10 – A stash of four gold and 7,000 silver coins discovered in Újlengyel, Hungary, is dated back to the 16th century.
- 13 – Discovery of the earliest known painting of an animal, a life-size Celebes warty pig, from at least 45,000 years BP, in a cave in South Sulawesi (Indonesia) located by an Australian-led team is announced.
- 14 – Discovery of the graves of the Seljuk Sultan of Rum Kilij Arslan I and his daughter Saide Hatun's burial in Silvan, Diyarbakir is announced.
- 17 – Further discoveries at the Saqqara necropolis site in Egypt, including 50 wooden coffins and a royal funerary temple, made by a team under Zahi Hawass, are announced.
- 19 – Archaeologists from the University of Buenos Aires announce the discovery of 12 graves dated to 6,000-1,300 years ago with necklaces and pendants in the Argentine Northwest.
- 20
  - Archaeologist from Israel Antiquities Authority (IAA) announce the discovery of an engraved stone from the late 5th century from the frame of an entrance door of a church, with a mosaic Greek inscription reading "Christ born of Mary" in the village of Et Taiyiba.
  - Archaeologists report the discovery of what may be the earliest evidence of human use of symbols – six lines engraved on a ~120-ky-old bone in the site of Nesher Ramla in Israel.
- 21 – Four shipwrecks, one dating to Roman times, are found near Kasos Island, Greece, in the Aegean Sea.
- 25 – Ruins of a wooden fort built by the Tlingit for use in the Battle of Sitka against Russian colonists in 1804 are found on Baranof Island, Alaska.
- 27 – Pamukkale University archaeologists announce the discovery of a cache containing 651 Roman coins dated about 2,100 years ago in a jug buried near a stream in Aizanoi in Turkey.
- 28 – Israeli archaeologists find ruins of a mosque in Tiberias that is believed to date from about 670 CE.
- 29 – 16 burials discovered in Taposiris Magna, Egypt, dated back to the Greek and Roman eras, some with gold leaf tongues, are reported.
- January – A Roman ceremonial carriage is discovered near the stables of an ancient villa at Civita Giuliana, north of Pompeii, Italy.

=== February ===
- 2 – Archaeologists from the Egyptian Ministry of Tourism and Antiquities announce the discovery of Ptolemaic period temple, a Roman fort and an early Coptic church and an inscription written in hieratic script at an archaeological site called Shiha Fort in Aswan.
- 9 – Archaeologists from the Pablo de Olavide University announce the discovery of remains of Hadrian's breakfast room which used to show his imperial power in his villa.
- 10 – American and Egyptian archaeologists find the world's oldest beer factory in Abydos, Egypt, dating to the reign of King Narmer, Early Dynastic Period.
- 14 – Polish archaeologists from Jagiellonian University announce the discovery of ancient rock art with anthropomorphic figures in a good condition at the Amak'hee 4 rockshelter site in Swaga Swaga Game Reserve in Tanzania. Paintings made with a reddish dye also depict buffalo heads, giraffe's head and neck, and domesticated cattle dated back to about several hundred years ago.
- 17 – Discovery of more than 300 Stone Age tools and artefacts in Rhuddlan in Denbighshire by archaeologists from Aeon Archaeology is announced.
- 18
  - Two 1,800-year-old sarcophagi found in Ramat Gan Safari, Israel, date back to the Roman period.
  - Discovery of a punic necropolis during sewage system renovation works in Marsala.
  - 1,000-year-old gold and silver Viking jewellery is unearthed on the Isle of Man.
- 23 – Archaeologists from DigVentures announce the discovery of at least 15 roundhouses dating from 400 to 100 BC. and remains of a Roman villa in England dating from 3rd to early 4th century CE.
- 24 – A hamam (bathhouse) thought to date from the 12th century has been discovered during refurbishment of a bar in Seville (modern-day Spain, historic Al-Andalus), it is announced.

=== March ===
- 1 – Discovery of the marble sarcophagus which is 1.5 meters tall and 33 centimeters wide in the Seyitgazi district at the Küllüoba site in Turkey during municipal construction work is announced.
- 13 – Buildings constructed of basalt stone and mud bricks, and carved into the rocks along with Greek religious inscriptions, date back to between the fourth and seventh centuries AD, found in 2020 at the Tal area south of Qasr Al-Ajouz in the Bahariya Oasis of Egypt, are reported.
- 19 – A 2,500-years-old bronze figurine of a bull is unearthed following heavy rain near Olympia, Greece.
- 21 – The partially mummified 6000-year-old remains of a child, probably a girl aged between 6 and 12 along with 2,000-year-old Dead Sea scrolls is found in Cave of Horror in Israel.
- 22 – A 3,000-year-old gold mask along with 500 cultural relics is unearthed at Sanxingdui, China.

=== April ===
- April – Archaeologists locate a hoard of Roman currency at a cave in the Asturias region of Spain originally unearthed by a badger.
- 6 – A 4,000-year-old stone, the Saint-Bélec slab, is identified as being the oldest known map of a territory in the world.
- 8 – A 3,000-year-old city, Aten, established by King Amenhotep III, has been discovered in a 7-month excavation on the western bank of Luxor, Egypt.
- 14 – A high status Roman complex excavated at Scarborough, North Yorkshire, said by Historic England to be "one of the most important Roman discoveries in the past decade", is reported.
- 20 – Discovery of the site of Harriet Tubman's father's cabin is announced by Maryland officials.
- 21 – Irish archaeologists announce the discovery of an untouched Bronze Age grave, skeletal remains, fragments of human bone and a large semicircular slab in the underground passageway on the Dingle Peninsula of County Kerry.
- 22 – A Bronze Age village has been found under the surface of Lake Lucerne, it is reported.
- 23 – During the construction of a gas station, in Atripalda, a Roman amphitheater has been discovered
- 27 – Announcements that:
  - 110 ancient tombs have been discovered at the Koum el-Khulgan archaeological site in Dakahlia Governorate, dated back to the Predynastic Period, Second Intermediate Period and Naqada III period.
  - A 1,600-year-old mosaic has been unearthed at Yavne, Israel, dated back to the Byzantine period.
- 30 – 2,500-year-old ornaments have been found near the town of Alingsås, Sweden.
- By April – Roman amphitheatre found at Mastaura in Turkey.

=== May ===
- 5 – A 2,000-year-old oil lamp has been discovered at the foundation of a building in Jerusalem's City of David.
- 6 – A 2,000-year-old marble head of Augustus has been discovered in Isernia, Italy.
- 11
  - 250 stone tombs have been discovered at Al-Hamidiyah cemetery, east of Sohag, dated back from Old Kingdom to the Ptolemaic dynasty.
  - 82 graves are discovered inside and outside kurgans in Istanbul, including symbols identified as runic alphabet from Romania's Vinča culture, dated back to between 3500 and 3000 B.C.
- 12 – Archaeologists announce the discovery of a 350,000-year-old Acheulean site named An Nasim with 354 artefacts, hand axes and stone tools in the Ha'il region.
- 17 – 2,000-year-old Roman baths have emerged from the sand dunes of the Cape Trafalgar, Spain.
- 19 – A large structure, possibly a warehouse dated back to the 3rd century B.C., is unearthed in Istanbul's Haydarpaşa, Asia Minor, in addition to pots and coins dating back to around 6 B.C.
- 30 – Announcement of prehistoric animal carvings found in Kilmartin Glen, Scotland. Thought to be between 4,000 and 5,000 years old, they are the first of their kind to be found in Scotland.
- 31
  - A medieval church is unearthed in Old Dongola, Sudan.
  - A 2,000-year-old Roman basilica complex is discovered in Ashkelon, Israel.

=== June ===
- 1 – Sassanid-era furniture is located at a Zoroastrian fire temple in Vigol, Isfahan province, Iran.
- 4 – A stele, which describes the military campaigns of Apries, is found in Ismailia, Egypt.
- 10 – IAA archaeologists led by Alla Nagorsky announce discovery of a 1,000-year-old intact chicken egg from the Abbasid period, but it accidentally suffers a small basal crack in the laboratory.
- 13 – A 1,800-year-old female statue is discovered in Metropolis, Asia Minor.
- 17 – A 2,800-year-old Urartian castle is unearthed at Gürpınar, Van, Eastern Anatolia.
- 18 – A 2,000-year-old leather shoe is found in a bog in Germany, alongside remains of a broken carriage axle and a Bronze Age road. The bog has helped preserve the shoe's structure, with its strap still intact.
- 21 – Gold coins found near Reepham, Norfolk in eastern England are dated back to the reign of Edward III.
- 24
  - An 18th-century shipwreck discovered at Nelson's Dockyard, Antigua, probably the 1762 Beaumont, which was built by the French East India Company and later used during the American Revolution.
  - A 6,000 year-old island settlement is located at Lumbarda, off Croatian coast.
- 29 – A 2,000 year-old Roman coffin with the remains of two people is excavated in Sydney Gardens, Bath, United Kingdom.

=== July ===
- 12 – 100 Roman coins are unearthed along the banks of the Aa River in the southern Netherlands, dated back between 27 B.C. and A.D. 180.
- 13
  - Two 2,500-year-old marble statues are discovered at the temple of Zeus Lepsynos, Euromus, Asia Minor.
  - A 2,550-year-old inscription from last king of Babylon, Nabonidus, is discovered at Al Hait (Fadak), Hail Region, Saudi Arabia.
- 14 – A cache of 87 silver coins is found in a field in the north of the Isle of Man, dated back between AD 1000 and 1035.
- 19 – A Graeco-Egyptian military ship is discovered at Heracleion, dated back to the Ptolemaic era. In addition, 2,400-year-old wicker baskets filled with fruit are also found at the same location.
- 20
  - Discovery of a Christian Visigoth sarcophagus at the Roman necropolis of Los Villaricos at Mula, Spain, is reported.
  - A heatwave results in lower water levels at Llyn Dulyn in north Wales, revealing the propeller of a US Douglas Dakota that crashed in the area on 11 November 1944.
- 22 – It is revealed that there are Roman roads now submerged in the Venetian Lagoon.

=== August ===
- August – Discovery of the well-preserved remains of impresario Marcus Venerius Secundio in the Porta Sarno necropolis of Pompeii.
- 11 – A cache of Nazi artifacts is found in Hagen, Germany in a building formerly belonging to the Nationalsozialistische Volkswohlfahrt.
- 14 – 1,700-year-old coins found near Atlit, Israel.
- 16 – An ancient relief depicting Greek-Persian wars discovered at Dascylium is dated back to the 5th century BCE.
- 18 – Byzantine-era wine press paved with a mosaic was uncovered in Ramat Ha-Sharon, Israel, along with an old coin minted by Emperor Heraclius.
- 20
  - A monastery dated back to the reign of Queen Cynethryth is unearthed in the grounds of Holy Trinity Church in Cookham, Berkshire, England.
  - A statue of Greek health goddess Hygieia was unearthed in Aizanoi, Asia Minor.
- Summer – A sculpted wooden figure from early Roman Britain is found on the course of HS2 near Twyford, Buckinghamshire.

=== September ===
- 3 – Remains of a 10,000-year-old Mesolithic settlement near the Veletma River are announced by archaeologists from the Institute of Archaeology of the Russian Academy of Sciences.
- 7 – Discovery of human remains from sacrifices dating to the Silla Dynasty at Wolseong Palace's western wall in Gyeongju (South Korea) is announced.
- 8
  - Remains of around 200 people have been discovered during the expansion of the royal burial chamber at Nieuwe Kerk in Delft.
  - Discovery of remains of St. Mary's church which dates back to 1080 near Stoke Mandeville on the course of HS2 in England by LP-Archaeology led by Rachel Wood is announced.
- 9 – Discovery of two polished stone balls in a 5500 years-old Neolithic burial tomb at Sanday, Orkney, is announced by archaeologists.
- 10 – Discovery of a 4,000-year-old Bronze Age coffin in a golf course pond in Lincolnshire, England, is announced by archaeologists. The coffin contained a well-preserved ax with a wooden handle and the burial of a high-ranking person.
- 13 – Discovery of Iron Age treasure including golden Roman coins, luxurious jewelry, an ornament and medallions known as bracteates dating back to the 6th century BCE is announced by Vejle Museum of Art in Vindelev, in Denmark.
- 18 – Archaeologists announce the discovery of ritualistic tools used in religious rituals at the ancient site of Tel al-Fara in the Kafr El-Sheikh Governorate in Egypt.
- 24
  - Archaeologists announce the remains of eight 800-year-old bodies nearby the ancient town of Chilca in Peru.
  - Discovery of more than 60 shaped clothmaking tools made from animal bones, as well as perforated seashells which are thought to date back 120,000 years at Contrebandiers Cave, in Morocco is announced.
  - Discovery of the White Sands fossil footprints in White Sands National Park, New Mexico, is first published. Dating to between 21,000 and 23,000 years BP makes this the oldest evidence for a human presence in North America.
- 29 – Trove of 1,500-year-old gold coins from the Roman Empire is revealed by two amateur divers in Xàbia in Spain.
- 30 – Archaeologists announce the discovery of a 40,000 year-old Neanderthal cave chamber at Vanguard Cave in Gibraltar.

=== October ===
- October – Portion of a shipwreck believed to be 200 years old found on a beach near Riga, Latvia.
- 29 – Discovery of Roman sculptures (a man, a woman and the head of a child) beneath the abandoned medieval church of St Mary's near Stoke Mandeville on the course of HS2 in England is announced by archaeologists.
- November – Discovery of three Greek bronze swords from 3,200 years BC in good condition from Achaea in Greece is reported.

=== December ===
- 1– Fifty-eight stone box graves dating to the Khojaly-Gadabay culture of the Late Bronze–Early Iron Age in Çovdar, Dashkasan District, Azerbaijan, were uncovered during rescue excavations. Archaeologists identified a burial custom in which males were buried on their right side and females on their left.
- 24 – Archaeologists announce the discovery of 1600 year-old eight tombs along with animal and human remains and many pieces of jewelry in the Kurtulus district of Ordu in Turkey.
- 28 – Discovery of unfinished Roman-era statue of a young man is announced at Agios Patapios in Veria, Greece. The headless marble statue is about three feet tall.
- Undated – Mausoleum of Emperor Wen of Han (d. 157 BCE) found in the Chinese city of Xi'an. In 2023 it is revealed that one of the animals ritually buried at the site was a giant panda, the first complete skeleton of a panda burial discovered.

== Events ==
- 20 January – Beads made in the Republic of Venice discovered since the 1960s at sites in Alaska are initially dated to the pre-Columbian era, subsequently assigned (probably) to the late-16th or early-17th century.
- 9 February – A conch from 18,000 years BP found in 1931 in Marsoulas Cave in the Haute-Garonne of France is demonstrated as having been adapted by Magdalenian people as a musical instrument.
- 1 March – A QAnon supporter vandalizes 4,000-year-old America's Stonehenge in Salem, New Hampshire. He is arrested and charged with felony criminal mischief.
- 10 March – The United States returns 280 pre-Hispanic archaeological pieces to Mexico. 270 had been stolen from various sites in Sonora and ten were from the Western Mexico shaft tomb tradition. The pieces had been recovered by immigration officials in 2012.
- 3 April – Pharaohs' Golden Parade: 22 royal Egyptian mummies are ceremonially transferred from the Egyptian Museum in Cairo to the new National Museum of Egyptian Civilization in Fustat. On 7 August, the Khufu ship is transferred here.
- 30 April – An Egyptian mummy, held in a Warsaw museum collection since 1826 and previously thought to be of a priest, has been revealed to be a pregnant woman, it is reported.
- 12 May – Analysis of excavations at Cerne Abbas Giant hill figure in England from 2020 indicates a date range for construction of 700–1100CE – the late Anglo-Saxon period, and much later than expected.
- c. June – Dating of bones of animals, possibly hunted and eaten, from Coxcatlan Cave Mexico to 30,000 years BP may lead to antedating the previously accepted arrival date of humans in the Americas.
- 13 July – The University of Sheffield in England decides to close its "world-renowned archaeology department".
- 15 July – Analysis suggesting an early medieval burial excavated at Suontaka Vesitorninmäki, Hattula, in southern Finland in 1968 with ambiguous features of gender expression is of an individual with Klinefelter syndrome is published.
- 30 July – The High Court of England and Wales rules that the approval of the Stonehenge road tunnel was unlawful.
- 3 August – Iraq reclaims 17,000 looted artifacts previously held by the Museum of the Bible in Washington, D.C.
- 17 August – The University of Worcester in England announces that it will stop teaching its archaeology degrees after the 2021–22 academic year.
- 20 October (Bioarchaeology) – Scientists report that, according to their analysis, today's domestic horses descend from the lower Volga-Don region, Russia. 273 ancient horse genomes further indicate that these populations replaced almost all local populations as they expanded rapidly throughout Eurasia from about 4200 years ago, that certain adaptations were strongly selected for by horse riding, and that equestrian material culture – including Sintashta spoke-wheeled chariots (but not Indo-European languages) and in the case of Asia Indo-Iranian languages – spread alongside.
- 11 November – 131 Anglo-Saxon gold coins and four other artifacts discovered in west Norfolk over the period 1991–2020 by a metal detectorist are declared treasure trove, making this the largest hoard of its period found in England; the greater number comprises Merovingian tremissis.
- October – "Greta", a skull found in 1943 in the midlands of England and previously believed to be the oldest in Britain, dated to 14,000 years BP, is redated to the late 11th century CE.
- 14 October – A late medieval harness pendant is found in Lincolnshire, becoming the 1 millionth record logged on the British Portable Antiquities Scheme database.
- December – Dating of early presence of sheep on the Faroe Islands suggests that they were imported by British or Irish settlers by 500 AD – some 350 years before Vikings arrived.

== Deaths ==
- 19 January – Sinclair Hood, 103, British classical archaeologist (b. 1917)
- 29 January – Beatriz Barba, 92, first woman to earn a degree in archaeology in Mexico, member of the Mexican Academy of Sciences (b. 1928)
- 21 February – Marc Waelkens, 72, Belgian archaeologist (b. 1948)
- 7 April – Simon Keay, 66, British archaeologist and academic (b. 1954)
- 10 April – Marcio Veloz Maggiolo, 84, Dominican writer, archaeologist and anthropologist, complications from COVID-19 (b. 1936)

== See also ==
- List of years in archaeology
- Archaeology of Israel
- Archaeology of Greece
- Stone Age in Azerbaijan
- Bronze and Iron Age in Azerbaijan
