= Alice Miles Woodruff =

American virologist (1900–1985)

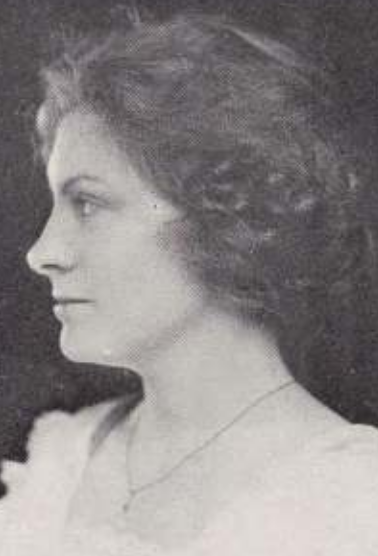
- Alice Lincoln Miles, from the 1922 Mount Holyoke College yearbook
- Born: November 29, 1900; Cambridge, Massachusetts
- Died: November 24, 1985 (aged 84); Highland Township, Michigan
- Occupation: Virologist
- Spouse: Charles Eugene Woodruff (m. 1927)
- Children: Alice, Mary Jean, Charles Eugene

Academic background
- Education: Mount Holyoke College; Yale University (MS, PhD)

Academic work
- Institutions: Vanderbilt University
- Main interests: Viruses
- Notable works: egg culture virology

Alice Miles Woodruff (November 29, 1900 – November 24, 1985), born Alice Lincoln Miles, was an American virologist. She developed a method for growing fowlpox outside of a live chicken alongside Ernest William Goodpasture. Her research greatly facilitated the rapid advancement in the study of viruses.

== Early life and education ==
Alice Lincoln Miles was born in Cambridge, Massachusetts, the daughter of Arthur L. Miles and Marie Augusta Putnam Miles. Her father was a dentist. She graduated from Mount Holyoke College in 1922. She obtained a master's degree in 1924 and a PhD in 1925 from Yale University.

== Career ==
Woodruff worked as a research assistant at Vanderbilt University from 1927 until 1931. While working with her husband and Goodpasture, she conducted studies in the "nature, infectivity, and purification of fowl-pox virus, and the character of the changes it induced on experimental infection of fowls," which became the forerunner in the cultivation of viruses.

Woodruff was a regional chair of the Women's International League for Peace and Freedom in her later years.

== Personal life ==
She married Charles Eugene ("Gene") Woodruff on 25 August 1927. They had three children together, Alice, Mary Jean, and Charles Eugene. She was widowed when her husband died in 1980; she died in Highland, Michigan, in 1985, aged 84 years.

== Bibliography ==
- Woodruff, Alice Miles; Goodpasture, Ernest W. (May 1931). "The Susceptibility of the Chorio-Allantoic Membrane of Chick Embryos to Infection with the Fowl-Pox Virus". American Journal of Pathology. 7 (3): 209–222. PMC 2062632. PMID 19969963.
