= 1849 in archaeology =

Below are notable events in archaeology that occurred in 1849.

== Explorations ==
- U.S. Army Lt. James H. Simpson leads the Washington Expedition, a military reconnaissance team which surveys Navajo lands and records cultural sites in Chaco Canyon. Illustrations created by the Kern brothers are included in a government report.
- U.S. Navy Capt. William F. Lynch identifies Tell el Kadi as the site of the ancient city of Dan.
- Site of Uruk discovered by William Loftus.

== Excavations ==
- Tunnel dug into Silbury Hill.

== Publications ==
- Austen H. Layard's Illustrations of the Monuments of Nineveh.
- Karl Richard Lepsius' Denkmaeler aus Aegypten und Aethiopien.

== Finds ==
- Find on Whaddon Chase, Buckinghamshire, England of a hoard of Iron Age gold staters.

== Births ==
- November 8 — Maxime Collignon, French archaeologist (d. 1917)
- December 5 — Eduard Seler, German Mesoamericanist (d. 1922)

== See also ==
- List of years in archaeology
- 1848 in archaeology
- 1850 in archaeology
