= 1929 in science =

The year 1929 in science and technology involved some significant events, listed below.

== Astronomy and space exploration ==
- July – Henry Norris Russell publishes his finding that hydrogen is the principal constituent of stars, acknowledging the previous demonstration of this by Cecilia Payne.
- July 17 – Robert H. Goddard tests the first rocket to carry scientific instruments (a barometer and a camera).
- Edwin Hubble publishes his discovery that the speed at which galaxies recede positively correlates with their distance, which becomes known as Hubble's law, the basis for understanding that the universe is expanding.
- George Gamow proposes hydrogen fusion as the energy source for stars.
- Clyde Tombaugh discovers several asteroids: 2839 Annette, 3583 Burdett, 3824 Brendalee, 1929 VS, 1929 VD1.
- Harold Horton Sheldon writes about the serious possibility of man visiting other planets through the use of rockets.
- Konstantin Tsiolkovsky proposes the construction of multistage rockets in his book «Космические поезда» (Cosmic Trains).

== Aviation ==
- July 5 – The Curtiss-Wright corporation is founded.
- August 8–29 – The German airship Graf Zeppelin makes a round-the-world flight.
- September 24 – Jimmy Doolittle takes off, flies over a set course, and lands by flight instruments alone.
- November 29 – US Admiral Richard Byrd becomes the first person to fly over the South Pole.
- December 16 – The British airship R100 makes its maiden flight, incorporating Barnes Wallis' pioneering use of a geodetic airframe.
- December 5 – Grumman Aircraft Engineering Corporation is founded.

== Biochemistry ==
- Carl and Gerty Cori propose the Cori cycle, describing how the human body processes carbohydrates.
- Adenosine triphosphate (ATP), an important cell coenzyme, is discovered by German biochemist Karl Lohmann, and independently by Cyrus Fiske and Yellapragada Subbarow of Harvard Medical School.
- Estrone is isolated and purified, the first estrogen to be discovered, by Adolf Butenandt.

== Biology ==
- C. B. van Niel makes the first announcement of his discovery that photosynthesis is a light-dependent redox reaction.
- Professor Frederick Gericke of the University of California, Los Angeles, demonstrates that plants can be grown soil-free all the way to maturity, the basis of hydroponics.

== Chemistry ==
- Sir John Lennard-Jones introduces his linear combination of atomic orbitals method for approximation of molecular orbitals.
- Lars Onsager publishes his reciprocal relations equations in thermodynamics, for which he will receive the 1968 Nobel Prize in Chemistry.
- Linus Pauling publishes Pauling's rules, key principles for the use of X-ray crystallography to deduce molecular structure.
- Styrene-butadiene is developed by German chemist Walter Bock.

== Communications ==
- June 27 – The first public demonstration of color television is held by Herbert E. Ives and colleagues at AT&T's Bell Telephone Laboratories in New York. The first images are a bouquet of roses and an American flag. A mechanical system is used to transmit 50-line images to Washington.
- August 20 – First transmissions of John Logie Baird's experimental 30-line television system by the British Broadcasting Corporation.
- November – Vladimir Zworykin takes out a patent for color television.
- First practical coaxial cable patented by Lloyd Espenschied and Herman Affel of Bell Labs.
- Rudolf Hell receives a patent for the Hellschreiber, an early fax machine.

== Earth sciences ==
- November 18 – Grand Banks earthquake: Off the south coast of Newfoundland in the Atlantic Ocean, a Richter magnitude 7.2 submarine earthquake centered on Grand Banks, breaks 12 submarine transatlantic telegraph cables and triggers a tsunami that destroys many south coast communities in the Burin Peninsula area.

== History of science ==
- October 21 – Henry Ford's Edison Institute is inaugurated at Dearborn, Michigan on the 50th anniversary of the invention of the incandescent light bulb, in the presence of President of the United States Herbert Hoover, Thomas Edison, Walter Chrysler, Marie Curie, George Eastman and Orville Wright (among others). Exhibits include the 17th century Newcomen atmospheric engine Fairbottom Bobs.
- Edwin Boring publishes A History of Experimental Psychology.

== Mathematics ==
- Kurt Gödel proves his completeness theorem.
- Kurt Mahler shows that the Prouhet–Thue–Morse constant is a transcendental number.
- Dimitrie Pompeiu poses the Pompeiu problem.
- Holbrook Working and Harold Hotelling devise the Working–Hotelling procedure for linear regression.

== Medicine ==
- Alexander Fleming publishes an article about penicillin in the British Journal of Experimental Pathology, for which he will receive the 1945 Nobel Prize in Physiology or Medicine.
- Hans Berger discovers human electroencephalography.
- Ernst Gräfenberg introduces Gräfenberg's ring, an intrauterine device, in Germany.
- Clinical application of cardiac catheterization begins with German Werner Forssmann who inserts a catheter into the vein of his own forearm, guides it fluoroscopically into his right atrium, and takes an X-ray picture of it.
- British surgeon Victor Negus publishes The Mechanism of the Larynx.

== Meteorology ==
- January 7 – Robert Bureau flies (and names) the first radiosonde using telemetry, in France.

== Paleontology ==
- Tilly Edinger publishes Die fossilen Gehirne (Fossil Brains), pioneering paleoneurology.

== Physics ==
- Robert J. Van de Graaff develops the Van de Graaff generator.
- Oskar Klein discovers the Klein paradox.
- Oskar Klein and Y. Nishina derive the Klein–Nishina cross section for high energy photon scattering by electrons.
- Sir Nevill Francis Mott derives the Mott cross section for the Coulomb scattering of relativistic electrons.
- Paul Dirac and Werner Heisenberg develop the quantum theory of ferromagnetism.
- Ernest Lawrence invents the cyclotron, for which he will receive the 1939 Nobel Prize in Physics.
- Edwin H. Land patents Polaroid polarizing film.

== Technology ==
- Sunglasses made from celluloid are first produced by Foster Grant for sale in Atlantic City, New Jersey.

== Awards ==
- Nobel Prize
  - Physics: Prince Louis-Victor Pierre Raymond de Broglie
  - Chemistry: Arthur Harden, Hans Karl August Simon von Euler-Chelpin
  - Physiology or Medicine: Christiaan Eijkman, Sir Frederick Gowland Hopkins

== Births ==
- January 3 – Gordon Moore (died 2023), American computing entrepreneur and scientific benefactor.
- January 8 – Erich Jantsch (died 1980), Austrian astrophysicist.
- January 29 – John Polanyi, German-born Canadian winner of the Nobel Prize in Chemistry.
- January 30 – Isamu Akasaki (died 2021), Japanese electronics engineer, winner of the Nobel Prize in Physics.
- January 31 – Rudolf Mössbauer (died 2011), German winner of the Nobel Prize in Physics.
- April 5 – Ivar Giaever, Norwegian winner of the Nobel Prize in Physics.
- April 8 – Morton B. Panish, American physical chemist.
- April 16 – Ralph Slatyer (died 2012), Australian ecologist and first Chief Scientist of Australia.
- April 22 – Michael Atiyah (died 2019), British mathematician.
- May 6 – Paul Lauterbur (died 2007), American chemist, winner of the Nobel Prize in Physiology or Medicine.
- May 10 – Geoffrey Burnstock (died 2020), English-born neurobiologist.
- May 17 – Kurt Gottfried (died 2022), Austrian-born American physicist.
- May 29 – Peter Higgs (died 2024), English theoretical physicist, winner of the Nobel Prize in Physics.
- June 3 – Werner Arber, Swiss microbiologist, winner of the Nobel Prize in Physiology or Medicine.
- June 10 – E. O. Wilson (died 2021), American entomologist.
- July 1 – Gerald Edelman (died 2014), American microbiologist, winner of the Nobel Prize in Physiology or Medicine.
- July 19 – Gaston Glock, Austrian engineer and inventor
- August 4 – Raymond Smallman (died 2015), British metallurgist and academic.
- September 5 – Andrian Nikolayev (died 2004), Chuvash cosmonaut.
- September 15
  - Murray Gell-Mann (died 2019), American theoretical physicist, winner of the Nobel Prize in Physics.
  - Stan Kelly-Bootle (died 2014), English computer programmer and folk singer-songwriter.
- October 19 – Lewis Wolpert (died 2021), British developmental biologist, author and broadcaster.
- November 2 – Richard E. Taylor (died 2018), Canadian American winner of the Nobel Prize in Physics.
- November 7 – Eric R. Kandel, Austrian-born neuropsychiatrist, winner of the Nobel Prize in Physiology or Medicine.
- November 24 – Franciszek Kokot (died 2021), Polish nephrologist.
- December 28 – Maarten Schmidt (died 2022), Dutch-born American astronomer
- December 31 – Võ Quý (died 2017), Vietnamese zoologist.

== Deaths ==
- February 3 – A. K. Erlang (born 1878), Danish mathematician.
- March 6 – David Dunbar Buick (born 1854), Scottish American automobile pioneer.
- April 4 – Karl Benz (born 1844), German automotive pioneer and mechanical engineer.
- April 27 – Charles E. de M. Sajous (born 1852), American endocrinologist.
- April 29 – Inez Whipple Wilder (born 1871), American herpetologist and anatomist.
- June 15 – Traian Lalescu (born 1882), Romanian mathematician.
- August 10
  - Pierre Fatou (born 1878), French mathematician.
  - Aletta Jacobs (born 1854), Dutch physician and women's suffrage activist.
- August 27 – Herman Potočnik Noordung (born 1892), Slovene pioneer of astronautics and cosmonautics.
- November 17 – Herman Hollerith (born 1860), American statistician, punched card data processing inventor.
- December 13 – Rosina Heikel (born 1842), Finnish physician.
