= Peter Eriksson (neuroscientist) =

Swedish neuroscientist

Peter Eriksson (June 5, 1959 – August 2, 2007) was a Swedish stem cell neuroscientist.

Eriksson was a frequently cited scientist who conducted ground-breaking research on neurogenesis in the hippocampus of the adult human brain. In 1998 he demonstrated the creation of nerve cells in the adult human hippocampus. He showed that new brain cells are created throughout the whole human lifespan, and that the integration of the new brain cells in the brain depended on the stimuli that the environment offered, thus providing an insight that could enhance the treatment of neurologically damaged patients.

He also elucidated the mechanism for neurogenesis, which could potentially lead to a cure for a range of neurological diseases, including Alzheimer's disease.
