= Fanny Gates =

American physicist

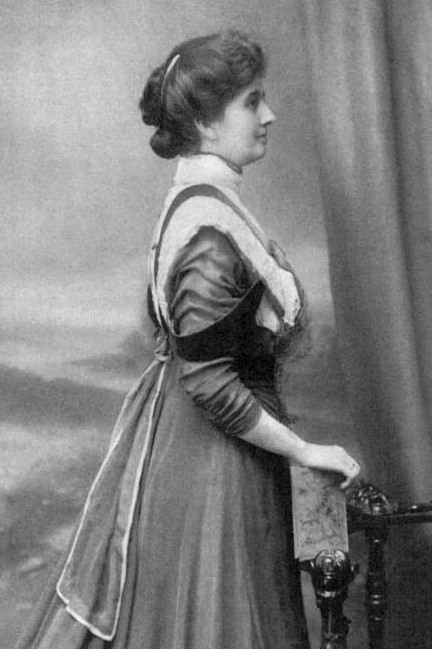
- Born: 26 April 1872; Waterloo, Iowa, United States
- Died: 24 February 1931 (aged 58); Chicago, United States
- Education: Northwestern University; University of Pennsylvania
- Known for: Radioactivity
- Scientific career
- Workplaces: Goucher College; University of Chicago; Grinnell College; University of Illinois Urbana-Champaign
- Thesis: The Conductivity of Air Caused by Certain Chemical Changes (1909)

Fanny Cook Gates (26 April 1872 – 24 February 1931) was an American physicist, an American Physical Society fellow and American Mathematical Society member. She made contributions to the research of radioactive materials, determining that radioactivity could not be destroyed by heat or ionization due to chemical reactions, and that radioactive materials differ from phosphorescent materials both qualitatively and quantitatively. More specifically, Gates showed that the emission of blue light from quinine was temperature dependent, providing evidence that the emitted light is produced from phosphorescence rather than radioactive decay. She also served as head of the physics department at Goucher, professor of physics and dean of women at Grinnell College, and the dean of women at the University of Illinois.

== Education and career ==
Gates received her B.S. from Northwestern University in 1894 and her M.A. in 1895, and finally her Ph.D. from the University of Pennsylvania in 1909. She wrote her PhD dissertation on "The Conductivity of Gases Caused by Certain Chemical Changes." She published two papers during graduate school on the subject of radioactivity.

From 1895 to 1897, she was a scholar and fellow in mathematics at Bryn Mawr College, where she received a President's European Fellowship. In the fall of 1897 she attended the University of Göttingen to further her studies in mathematics and physics; and in the winter of 1898, furthered her studies at the Polytechnik Institute at Zurich. Gates returned to the U.S. in 1898 to accept a position at the Women's College of Baltimore (Goucher College), where she ordered in advance of her arrival, additional physics equipment to build her lab to study spectra and X-rays. She remained at Goucher for 13 years, leaving in 1911 to work for the University of Chicago. From 1902 to 1903 she took a leave of absence from Goucher and worked with Ernest Rutherford and Harriet Brooks at McGill University, where her research on radioactivity continued, proving that radioactive phenomena were not simple chemical or physical processes. In 1905, Gates worked with J.J. Thomson, her research continued to support her reputation in the scientific community.

In 1911, Gates left her position at Goucher in Baltimore to accept a research position at the University of Chicago. Two years after that she was offered a professor of physics and dean of women position at Grinnell College in Iowa. She continued in this role for three years before moving to the University of Illinois at Urbana-Champaign in 1916, where she held the position of associate professor of physics and dean of women for two years, and served on the policy and planning committee of the university.

There is controversy on the subject of Gates' exit from her position at the University of Illinois, while some sources suggest that Gates was fired by the university for problems relating to drug use, others argue that she faced a great deal of difficulty with the school administration, either due to an inclination for research as opposed to administrative work, or due to discriminatory practices. After 1918, Gates largely retired to the private sector, serving as the general secretary for the YMCA of New York (1918-1919, 1921-1922), and teaching at two private schools in New York and Bryn Mawr, before retiring entirely to research work after a final stint as a physics teacher at Roycenmore School in Evanson, Illinois (1928-1931). When asked about her reason for leaving the University of Illinois, President James told the YWCA, "She did not like the limited scope for her activity which the office here presented and therefore was looking all the time for a wider field. She needs a wider opportunity for her abilities and energy." After 1918, Gates largely retired to the private sector, serving as the general secretary for the YMCA of New York (1918-1919, 1921-1922), and teaching at two private schools in New York and Bryn Mawr College, before retiring entirely to research work after a final stint as a physics teacher at Roycenmore School in Evanson, Illinois (1928-1931).

== Contributions to physics ==
=== Effect of Heat on Excited Radioactivity ===
Published in 1903, this paper expands on the work that Gates did with Ernest Rutherford and Harriet Brooks. This paper explains in detail a series of experiments Gates performed under the direction of Rutherford examining the relationship between heat and excited radioactive particles, concluding with 4 distinct observations.

1. Excited radioactivity cannot be destroyed by heat.
2. Active particles are removed from wires (primarily platinum in the detailed experiments) at a temperature just below white heat, and are transferred unchanged to the surfaces of the cooler solids nearby.
3. By removing the surrounding gas as fast as the wire is heated, a majority of radioactive particles can be carried off with it.
4. The removal of the excited radioactivity from the wire is probably due to a volatilization of the radioactive material.

=== On the Nature of Certain Radiations from the Sulphate of Quinine ===
While under the supervision of Ernest Rutherford in 1903, Gates also researched the phosphorescent and conductive properties of quinine, and whether these properties are also present in other radioactive substances. This work was based on that of Le Bon, and detailed a series of experiments detailing the effects of various tests on samples of heated quinine and comparing them to known tests on the known properties of other radioactive materials, resulting in 5 distinct conclusions.

1. Radiation from quinine is only apparent when accompanied by great temperature change, is inconsistent during the change, and ends shortly after the temperature change. Temperature change does not affect the rate of discharge of electricity between plates exposed to the radiations from the active elements, and the radiation from said plates does not deteriorate appreciably with time.
2. Maximum ionization cannot be reached with quinine radiations even in a strong magnetic field, while a comparatively weak field will have this effect on radium and other active elements.
3. Quinine radiations are largely absorbed in 2–3 mm of air, and can be absorbed far sooner than that, while even the least penetrating radiations from the active elements will pass through at least several cm of air with no appreciable loss in intensity.
4. Quinine radiation can be completely blocked with a very thin sheet of aluminum, which does not affect the rays of uranium, radium, or thorium.
5. While the rate of ionization due to radon radiation is independent of the direction of the field they are generated in, ionization from quinine radiation changes dramatically when the field is reversed.

Using these conclusions, Gates was able to assert that ionization from quinine radiation is completely different from that of active elements, resulting from molecular actions rather than he spontaneous projection of charged masses from the atom.

=== The Conductivity of the Air Due to the Sulphate of Quinine ===
In 1909, Gates researched and published her PhD thesis, a 12-page work, entitled "The Conductivity of Air Caused by Certain Chemical Changes", on the effect that heated quinine has on conductivity. In this paper Gates thoroughly researched the phenomenon where heating quinine raised the conductivity of the surrounding air in a series of controlled tests, expanding on her previous work in On the nature of certain radiations from the sulphate of quinine. Gates eventually concluded that while quinine did indeed have the reported effect on air conductivity, several other compounds are present in the sulphate solution that the initial concept was based on, which would have a small interfering effect as the heating process progressed.

== Death ==
Fanny Gates continued to work until her death in Chicago on February 24, 1931. While the cause of her death was either undetermined or unreported, like many early scientists working with radioactive materials, it has been written that her death may have been due to a radiation-related disease.
