= 1925 in science =

The year 1925 in science and technology involved some significant events, listed below.

== Astronomy and space science ==
- January 1 – Cecilia Payne completes her PhD thesis Stellar Atmospheres: a Contribution to the Observational Study of High Temperature in the Reversing Layers of Stars at Radcliffe College of Harvard University, providing spectral evidence that stars are composed almost entirely of hydrogen with helium, contrary to scientific consensus at the time; however, her findings will be vindicated by 1929 and astronomer Otto Struve will describe her work as "the most brilliant PhD thesis ever written in astronomy".

== Biology ==
- July 10–21 – Scopes Trial: In a staged test case (the "Monkey Trial") in Dayton, Tennessee, John T. Scopes, a young high school science teacher is accused of assigning a reading from a state-mandated textbook on Darwinian evolution in violation of a Tennessee state law, the "Butler Act". He is found guilty and fined $100, though the verdict is later overturned on a technicality.
- September – Official opening of Thijsse's Hof (Garden of Thijsse), the first wildlife garden in the Netherlands, in Bloemendaal near Haarlem.
- Approximate date – Extinction of the Bubal hartebeest in North Africa.

== Cartography ==
- Adams hemisphere-in-a-square projection published by American cartographer Oscar S. Adams.

== Chemistry ==
- May – Rhenium is discovered by Walter Noddack and Ida Tacke in Berlin, the last stable, non-radioactive naturally occurring element to be found.
- The Fischer–Tropsch process for production of hydrocarbons is first developed by Franz Fischer and Hans Tropsch at the Kaiser-Wilhelm-Institut für Kohlenforschung in Mülheim an der Ruhr, Germany.

== History of science ==
- Museum of the History of Science opens in the Old Ashmolean building in Oxford, set up by Robert Gunther based largely on the collection given by Dr Lewis Evans.
- Pharmazie-Historisches Museum der Universität Basel established by donation of the collection of pharmacist Josef Anton Häfliger.
- Edwin Arthur Burtt's The Metaphysical Foundations of Modern Physical Science is published.

== Physics ==
- January – Wolfgang Pauli announces his exclusion rule.
- June – Werner Heisenberg spends time on Heligoland resulting in the September publication of his seminal paper, "Über quantentheoretische Umdeutung kinematischer und mechanischer Beziehungen" ("Quantum theoretical re-interpretation of kinematic and mechanical relations") in Zeitschrift für Physik.
- September–November – Heisenberg, Max Born and Pascual Jordan submit their papers "Zur Quantenmechanik" setting out their matrix formulation of quantum mechanics, to Zeitschrift für Physik.

== Technology ==
- June 13 – Charles Francis Jenkins achieves the first synchronized transmission of pictures and sound, using 48 lines, and a mechanical system. A 10-minute film of a miniature windmill in motion is sent across 5 miles from Anacostia to Washington, DC. The images are viewed by representatives of the Bureau of Standards, the U.S. Navy, the Department of Commerce and others. Jenkins calls this "the first public demonstration of radiovision".
- October 2 – John Logie Baird successfully transmits the first television pictures with a greyscale image, in London.
- October 22 – Julius Edgar Lilienfeld files the first patent for a form of field-effect transistor.
- November 4 – Charles F. Brannock files a patent for the Brannock Device for measuring shoe sizes.
- late 1925 or early 1926 – Vladimir K. Zworykin demonstrates a cathode-ray tube television system using Braun tubes at the Westinghouse Electric laboratories in Pittsburgh, Pennsylvania.
- Jonas Hesselman introduces the Hesselman engine.

== Other events ==
- Sinclair Lewis's novel Arrowsmith is published in the United States, notable in having the culture of medical science as a principal theme.

== Awards ==
- Nobel Prizes
  - Physics – James Franck, Gustav Ludwig Hertz
  - Chemistry – Richard Adolf Zsigmondy

== Births ==
- January 7 – Gerald Durrell (died 1995), Indian-born British wildlife conservationist.
- January 30 – Douglas Engelbart (died 2013), American pioneer in human–computer interaction.
- February 1 – John F. Yardley (died 2001), American aeronautical engineer.
- February 25 – Elliott Organick (died 1985), American computer scientist and educator.
- February 28 – Louis Nirenberg (died 2020), Canadian-born American mathematician.
- March 1 – Solomon Marcus (died 2016), Romanian mathematician.
- March 20 – David Warren (died 2010), Australian aviation scientist.
- April 12 – Evelyn Berezin (died 2018), American computer scientist.
- May 1 – Scott Carpenter (died 2013), American astronaut.
- May 16 – Nancy Roman (died 2018), American astronomer.
- May 27 – John L. Harper (died 2009), British biologist, specializing in ecology and plant population biology.
- June 17 – Alexander Shulgin (died 2014), American psychopharmacologist.
- July 8 – Norbert Pfennig (died 2008), German microbiologist.
- July 26 – Joseph Engelberger (died 2015), American robotics engineer.
- August 10 – Stanislav Brebera (died 2012), Czech chemist.
- August 19 – Frederic Richards (died 2009), American biochemist and biophysicist known for solving the crystal structure of the ribonuclease S enzyme in 1967 and for defining the concept of solvent-accessible surface.
- September 16 – Eugene Garfield (died 2017), American pioneer of bibliometrics and scientometrics.
- September 27 – Robert Edwards (died 2013), British physiologist and pioneer of in vitro fertilisation, recipient of the 2010 Nobel Prize in Physiology or Medicine.
- September 28 – Seymour Cray (died 1996), American supercomputer architect.
- September 30 – Arkady Ostashev (died 1998), Soviet, Russian scientist, participant in the launch of the first artificial Earth satellite and the first cosmonaut, Candidate of Technical Sciences, Docent, laureate of the Lenin and state prizes.
- October 13 – Margaret Roberts (died 2013), chemist and Prime Minister of the United Kingdom.
- October 29 – Klaus Roth (died 2015), German-born mathematician.
- October 31 – John Pople (died 2004), British theoretical chemist, recipient of the 1998 Nobel Prize in Chemistry.
- November 16 – Michel Jouvet (died 2017), French oneirologist.
- December 1 – Martin Rodbell (died 1998), American biochemist, recipient of the Nobel Prize in Physiology or Medicine.
- December 11 – Paul Greengard (died 2019), American neuroscientist, recipient of the Nobel Prize in Physiology or Medicine.

== Deaths ==
- February 3 – Oliver Heaviside (born 1850), English physicist.
- February 22 – Sir Clifford Allbutt (born 1836), English physician, inventor of the clinical thermometer.
- March 18 – Oswald Bertram Lower (born 1864), Australian lepidopterist.
- May 5 – Catharine van Tussenbroek (born 1852), Dutch physician.
- June 3 – Camille Flammarion (born 1842), French astronomer.
- June 22 – Felix Klein (born 1849), German mathematician.
- July 26 – Gottlob Frege (born 1848), German philosopher, logician and mathematician.
- October 31 – José Ingenieros (born 1877), Argentine polymath.
