= 1935 in science =

The year 1935 in science and technology involved some significant events, listed below.

== Astronomy ==
- May 14 – Opening of the Griffith Observatory in Los Angeles.
- October 3 – Opening of the Hayden Planetarium in New York City.

== Chemistry ==
- January – Charles Richter publishes a paper detailing a new scale designed to describe the magnitude of earthquakes in objective terms. This scale will be widely adopted and become known as the Richter scale.
- February 28–March 1 – Working with polyamides to develop a viable new fiber for chemical company DuPont, American chemist Gerard Bérchet working under the direction of Wallace Carothers first synthesizes the synthetic polymer nylon at Wilmington, Delaware.
- April 13 – Dorothy Hodgkin publishes her first solo paper, on the methodology of X-ray crystallography of insulin.
- Vitamin E is first isolated in a pure form by Gladys Anderson Emerson at the University of California, Berkeley.
- Eastman Kodak first markets Kodachrome subtractive color reversal film as 16 mm movie film. The product has been invented by two professional musicians, Leopold Godowsky Jr. and Leopold Mannes.

== Ecology ==
- English botanist Arthur Tansley introduces the concept of the ecosystem.

== Geology ==
- Charles Richter and Beno Gutenberg develop the Richter magnitude scale for quantifying earthquakes.

== History of science and technology ==
- American bacteriologist Hans Zinsser publishes Rats, lice and history: being a study in biography, which... deals with the life history of typhus fever.
- Cornish Engines Preservation Committee formed to conserve the Levant Mine beam engine in Cornwall, England.

== Mathematics ==
- April 19 – Alonzo Church presents his paper "An unsolvable problem of elementary number theory", introducing his theorem on the Entscheidungsproblem, to the American Mathematical Society.
- Octav Onicescu and Gheorghe Mihoc develop the notion of the "chain with complete links" in probability theory.
- George Pólya develops counting techniques for graphs as algebra.
- George K. Zipf proposes Zipf's law on probability distribution.

== Pharmacology ==
- January 2 – IG Farben are granted a patent in Germany for the medical application of the first sulfonamide prodrug, Sulfonamidochrysoidine (KI-730; marketed as Prontosil). In February, Gerhard Domagk and others publish (in Deutsche Medizinische Wochenschrift) the first clinical results on its properties as an antibiotic, the first commercially available; and in November a team directed by Ernest Fourneau at the Pasteur Institute identify sulfanilamide as the active component.

== Physics ==
- January 8 – A.C. Hardy patents the spectrophotometer.
- February 26 – Robert Watson-Watt and Arnold Wilkins first demonstrate the reflection of radio waves from an aircraft, near Daventry in England; on June 17, the first radio detection of an aircraft by ground-based radar is made at Orford Ness.
- Einstein, Podolsky, and Rosen publish a paper arguing that quantum mechanics is not a complete physical theory (the EPR paradox). Discussion of this introduces the 'Schrödinger's cat' thought experiment.
- Jacques Yvon introduces S-particle distribution functions in classical statistical mechanics; they will later be included in the BBGKY hierarchy.

== Physiology and medicine ==
- January 28 – Iceland becomes the first country to legalize abortion on medical grounds.
- May – The hormone testosterone is first isolated and named by a team at Organon in the Netherlands led by German scientist Ernst Laqueur. In August, the chemical synthesis of testosterone from cholesterol is achieved by Adolf Butenandt and Günther Hanisch. A week later, the Ciba group in Zurich, Leopold Ruzicka and A. Wettstein, publish their synthesis of the hormone.
- Ladislas J. Meduna discovers metrazol shock therapy.
- First vaccine for yellow fever.
- German physician Karl Matthes develops the first two-wavelength ear O_{2} saturation meter.

== Technology ==
- January 24 – The first beer can is sold in Richmond, Virginia, United States, by the Gottfried Krueger Brewing Company.
- June 12 – Conrad Bahr and George Pfefferle file a United States patent for an adjustable ratcheting torque wrench.
- July 16 – The world's first parking meter is installed in Oklahoma City to a design by Holger George Thuesen and Gerald A. Hale patented by Carl Magee.
- November 6
  - Edwin H. Armstrong presents his paper on FM broadcasting, "A Method of Reducing Disturbances in Radio Signaling by a System of Frequency Modulation", to the New York section of the Institute of Radio Engineers.
  - First flight of the Hawker Hurricane British fighter aircraft, designed by Sydney Camm.
- Callender-Hamilton bridge patented by A. M. Hamilton.
- Helical lobe rotary-screw compressor patented by Alf Lysholm of Ljungstroms Angturbin in Sweden.

== Events ==
- September 16–21 – First Congress for the Unity of Science is held at the Sorbonne.

== Awards ==
- Nobel Prizes
  - Physics – James Chadwick
  - Chemistry – Frédéric Joliot, Irène Joliot-Curie
  - Medicine – Hans Spemann

== Births ==
- January 26 – Andrew J. Stofan, American astronautical engineer.
- January 29 – Roger Payne (died 2023), American biologist and zoologist.
- February 15 – Roger B. Chaffee (died in accident 1967), American astronaut.
- February 27 – Anne Treisman, née Taylor (died 2018), English-born psychologist.
- April 11 – Kazys Almenas (died 2017), Lithuanian physicist, engineer and publisher.
- April 25 – Jim Peebles, Canadian-born theoretical cosmologist, winner of the Nobel Prize in Physics.
- June 1 – Jacqueline Naze Tjøtta (died 2017), French-born mathematician.
- June 14 – Louise Hay, née Schmir (died 1989), French-born American mathematician.
- June 25 – Charles Sheffield (died 2002), English-born science fiction author and physicist.
- June 30 – Animesh Chakravorty, Bengali Indian academic, chemistry professor.
- July 2 – Sergei Khrushchev, Soviet, Russian and American control engineer (died 2020).
- July 7 – H. Franklin Bunn, American physician, hematologist and biochemist.
- July 12 – Satoshi Ōmura, Japanese biochemist, winner of the Nobel Prize in Physiology or Medicine.
- July 14 – Ei-ichi Negishi, Japanese chemist, winner of the Nobel Prize in Chemistry.
- August 3 – Georgy Shonin (died 1997), Ukrainian cosmonaut.
- August 26 – Karen Spärck Jones (died 2007), English computer scientist.
- September 11 – Gherman Titov (died 2000), Soviet cosmonaut.
- September 12 – Harvey J. Alter, American virologist, winner of the Nobel Prize.
- September 19 – Milan Antal (died 1999), Slovak astronomer
- October 23 – JacSue Kehoe, American neuroscientist
- October 26 – Ora Mendelsohn Rosen (died 1990), American biomedical researcher.
- October 31 – Ronald Graham (died 2020), American mathematician.
- November 16 – Magdi Yacoub, Egyptian-born cardiothoracic surgeon.
- November 20 – Michael F. Ashby, English materials engineer.
- December 27 – Stephan Tanneberger (died 2018), German oncologist, chemist.

== Deaths ==
- February 15 – Bohuslav Brauner, Czech chemist (born 1855)
- March 7 – Mary Gage Day, American physician (born 1857)
- March 12 – Mihajlo Pupin (born 1858), Serbian American physicist.
- March 16 – John Macleod (born 1876), Scottish physician and physiologist, winner of the Nobel Prize in Physiology or Medicine.
- May 12 – Abraham Groves (born 1847), Canadian surgeon.
- May 21 – Hugo de Vries, Dutch botanist and geneticist (born 1848)
- July 3 – André Citroën (born 1878), French automobile manufacturer.
- August 21 – Kintarô Okamura (born 1867), Japanese phycologist.
- September 19 – Konstantin Tsiolkovsky, Russian rocket scientist (born 1857)
- September 28 – W. K. Dickson (born 1860), British cinematographic pioneer.
- December 4 – Charles Richet (born 1850), French physiologist, winner of the Nobel Prize in Physiology or Medicine.
- November 6 – Henry Fairfield Osborn (born 1857), American paleontologist.
- November 21 – Agnes Pockels (born 1862), German chemist.
- December 10 – Sir John Carden, 6th Baronet (born 1892), English tank and vehicle designer (died in 1935 SABENA Savoia-Marchetti S.73 crash).
- December 12 – Charles Loomis Dana (born 1852), American neurologist.
- December 13 – Victor Grignard, French chemist, Nobel Prize laureate (born 1871)
