= 1922 in science =

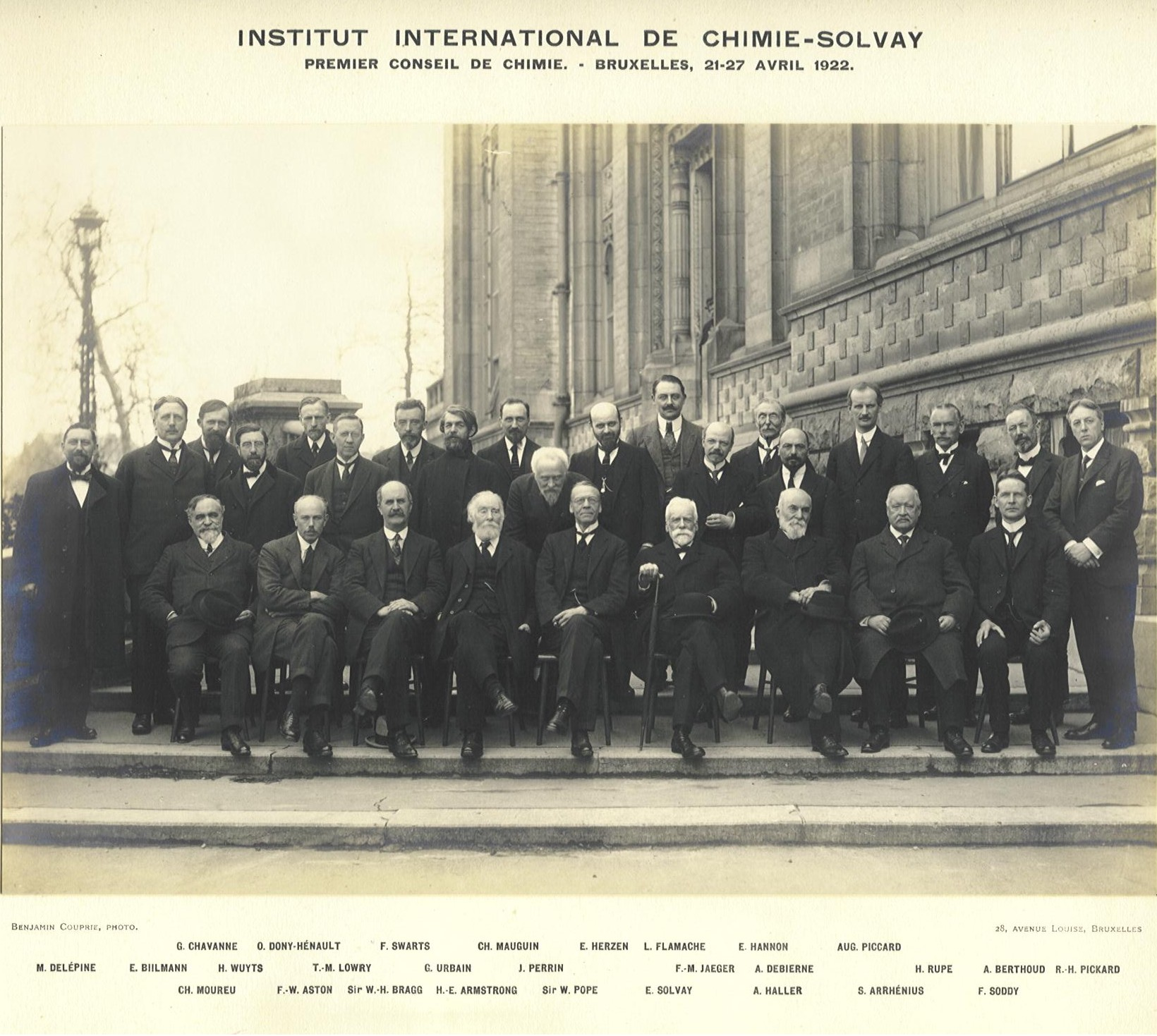
Attendees of the 1922 Solvay Conference (a series of conferences devoted to preeminent unsolved problems in both physics and chemistry)

The year 1922 in science and technology involved some significant events, listed below.

== Archaeology ==
- November 4 – British archaeologist Howard Carter and his men find the entrance to King Tutankhamen's tomb in the Valley of the Kings of Egypt.

== Biology ==
- August – The California grizzly bear is hunted to extinction.
- Last known wild Barbary lion (P. l. leo) shot in the Atlas Mountains of Morocco.
- The Amur tiger becomes extinct in South Korea.
- H. J. Muller sets out the basic properties of genetic heredity.

== Chemistry ==
- June 20 – Degesch applies to patent the cyanide-based insecticide Zyklon B (credited to Walter Heerdt) in Germany.
- Vitamin E is discovered by Herbert McLean Evans and Katharine Scott Bishop at the University of California, Berkeley and Vitamin D by Elmer McCollum and others.
- Czech chemist Jaroslav Heyrovský invents polarographic methods of chemical analysis.
- German chemist Hermann Staudinger proposes what he will come to call macromolecules.

== Ethnology ==
- Bronisław Malinowski's influential ethnological text Argonauts of the Western Pacific is published.

== Mathematics ==
- First publication of Ludwig Wittgenstein's Tractatus Logico-Philosophicus in an English translation.
- Jarl Waldemar Lindeberg provides a proof of the "Lindeberg condition" of the central limit theorem.
- Ernst Steinitz proves Steinitz's theorem in polyhedral combinatorics.

== Medicine ==
- January 11 – First successful insulin treatment of diabetes, by Frederick Banting in Toronto, using a pure preparation intravenously injected; on the same date Nicolae Paulescu makes an apparently successful rectal administration of an insulin preparation.

== Meteorology ==
- English mathematical physicist Lewis Fry Richardson proposes a scheme for weather forecasting by solution of differential equations, the method used in modern times, in his work Weather Prediction by Numerical Process.

== Paleontology ==
- First of four successive American Museum of Natural History expeditions to Mongolia under Roy Chapman Andrews which will discover fossils of Indricotherium (a gigantic hornless rhinoceros then named "Baluchitherium"), Protoceratops, a nest of Protoceratops eggs (found in 1995 to be from Oviraptor), Pinacosaurus, Saurornithoides, Oviraptor and Velociraptor, none of which were known before.

== Physics ==
- Arthur Compton studies X-ray photon scattering by electrons.
- Otto Stern and Walther Gerlach show "space quantization".
- Hilding Faxén introduces Faxén's law for the velocity of a sphere in fluid dynamics.
- Albert Einstein's The Meaning of Relativity: Four Lectures Delivered at Princeton University, May 1921 is published by Princeton University Press.

== Technology ==
- February 14 – The world's first regular wireless broadcasts for entertainment, made by Peter Eckersley, begin transmission on radio station 2MT from a hut at the Marconi Company laboratories at Writtle near Chelmsford in England. This is followed in the United Kingdom on May 11 by station 2LO from Marconi House in London, which from November 22 becomes the British Broadcasting Company (BBC).
- Lancia Lambda is the first automobile to use monocoque construction.
- Approximate date – Madeleine Vionnet introduces the bias cut dress in Paris.

== Awards ==
- Nobel Prize
  - Physics – Niels Bohr
  - Chemistry – Francis William Aston
  - Physiology or Medicine – Archibald Vivian Hill and Otto Fritz Meyerhof

== Births ==
- January 9 – Har Gobind Khorana (died 2011), Indian-born biochemist and Nobel Prize in Physiology or Medicine laureate (shared with Ralph F. Hirschmann).
- February 12 – William Rashkind (died 1986), American cardiologist.
- March 4 – Geoff Tootill (died 2017), English computer scientist.
- March 7 – Olga Ladyzhenskaya (died 2004), Russian mathematician.
- April 22 – Wolf V. Vishniac (died 1973), American microbiologist.
- May 4 – Eugenie Clark (died 2015), American ichthyologist.
- May 6 – Ralph F. Hirschmann (died 2009), German American biochemist, leader of a team responsible for the first organic synthesis of an enzyme, a ribonuclease; Nobel Prize in Physiology or Medicine laureate (shared with Har Gobind Khorana).
- June 19 – Aage Bohr (died 2009), Danish nuclear physicist and Nobel Prize in Physics laureate.
- June 22 – Ewen Whitaker (died 2016), English-born lunar astronomer.
- June 26 – Cuchlaine King (died 2019), British geomorphologist.
- June 29 – San Baw (died 1984), Burmese orthopaedic surgeon.
- July 9 – Kathleen Booth (died 2022), English-born computer scientist.
- July 15 – Leon M. Lederman (died 2018), American experimental physicist and Nobel Prize in Physics laureate.
- July 18 – Thomas Kuhn (died 1996), American philosopher of science.
- July 25 – John B. Goodenough (died 2023), German-born American solid-state physicist and Nobel Prize in Chemistry laureate.
- August 24 – Donald Henry Colless (died 2012), Australian entomologist.
- September 2 – Arthur Ashkin (died 2020), American physicist and Nobel Prize in Physics laureate.
- September 5 – Denys Wilkinson (died 2016), English nuclear physicist.
- November 8 – Christiaan Barnard (died 2001), South African cardiac surgeon.
- November 15 – David Sidney Feingold (died 2019), American biochemist and academic.
- November 26 – John D. Hoffman (died 2004), American nuclear chemist.
- December 18 – Esther Lederberg (died 2006), American microbiologist.

== Deaths ==
- January 5 – Ernest Shackleton (born 1874), Anglo-Irish explorer (of heart attack at South Georgia Island).
- January 15 – Edward Hopkinson (born 1859), English electrical engineer.
- January 22 – Camille Jordan (born 1838), French mathematician.
- April 1 – Hermann Rorschach (born 1884), Swiss psychiatrist.
- April 9 – Sir Patrick Manson (born 1844), Scottish-born "father of tropical medicine".
- May 26 – Ernest Solvay (born 1838), Belgian chemist.
- June 18 – Jacobus Kapteyn (born 1851), Dutch astronomer.
- August 2 – Alexander Graham Bell (born 1847), Scottish American inventor (in Nova Scotia).
- August 18 – W. H. Hudson (born 1841), Anglo-Argentine naturalist.
- August 29 – Sophie Bryant (born 1850), Anglo-Irish mathematician and educationalist (in hiking accident in the Alps).
- September 7 – William Stewart Halsted (born 1852), American surgeon.
- October 25 – Oscar Hertwig (born 1849), German zoologist.
