= 1909 in science =

The year 1909 in science and technology involved some significant events, listed below.

== Astronomy ==
- August 20 – Dwarf planet Pluto is photographed for the first time, at the Yerkes Observatory in Williams Bay, Wisconsin, U.S., 21 years before being identified.
- Comet Halley first becomes visible on a photographic plate.

== Biology ==
- Danish plant physiologist Wilhelm Johannsen introduces the term "Gene".
- Karl Landsteiner, Constantin Levaditi and Erwin Popper first isolate the poliovirus.
- Thomas Hunt Morgan produces heritable mutant Drosophila melanogaster.

== Chemistry ==
- February 5 – Leo Baekeland announces the creation of the early plastic Bakelite, a hard thermosetting phenol formaldehyde resin, to the American Chemical Society.
- Summer – Fritz Haber and Carl Bosch first demonstrate the Haber process, the catalytic formation of ammonia from hydrogen and atmospheric nitrogen under conditions of high temperature and pressure.
- The concept of p[H] as a measure of the acidity or basicity of an aqueous solution is introduced by Danish chemist Søren Peder Lauritz Sørensen at the Carlsberg Laboratory.
- A team under German chemist Fritz Hofmann first synthesizes synthetic rubber (Methylkautschuk).

== Geology ==
- January 16 – Ernest Shackleton's expedition locates the South Magnetic Pole.
- April 6 – Robert Peary, Matthew Henson, and four Eskimo explorers come within a few miles of the North Pole.
- October 8 – An earthquake in the Zagreb area leads Andrija Mohorovičić to identify the Mohorovičić discontinuity.

== Mathematics ==
- L. E. J. Brouwer makes a proof of the Brouwer fixed-point theorem.

== Paleontology ==
- August 30 – Discovery of the Burgess Shale Cambrian fossil site in the Canadian Rockies by paleontologist Charles Walcott of the Smithsonian Institution.
- Excavation of the dinosaur bone beds at what will become Dinosaur National Monument in the Uinta Mountains of the United States by paleontologist Earl Douglass working for the Carnegie Museum of Natural History.

== Physics ==
- Paul Ehrenfest presents the Ehrenfest paradox.
- Albert Einstein together with Marcel Grossmann starts to develop a theory which would bind metric tensor g_{ik}, which defines a space geometry, with a source of gravity, that is with mass.
- Hans Geiger and Ernest Marsden discover large angle deflections of alpha particles by thin metal foils.
- Ernest Rutherford and Thomas Royds demonstrate that alpha particles are doubly ionized helium atoms.

== Physiology and medicine ==
- July – Ivy Evelyn Woodward is admitted as the first woman Member of the Royal College of Physicians in the United Kingdom.
- September – Sigmund Freud delivers his only lectures in the United States, on psychoanalysis, at Clark University, Worcester, Massachusetts, giving public recognition to the subject in the anglophone world.
- Austro-Hungarian neurologist and psychiatrist Rezső Bálint first describes Bálint's syndrome.
- German neurologist Korbinian Brodmann defines the cytoarchitecture of the Brodmann area of the cerebral cortex.
- Brazilian physician and infectologist Carlos Chagas first describes Chagas disease.
- French otolaryngologist Étienne Lombard discovers the Lombard effect.
- In psychology, Edward B. Titchener makes the first published coinage of the term Empathy as a translation of the German Einfühlungsvermögen.

== Technology ==
- March 18 – Einar Dessau uses a shortwave radio transmitter in Denmark.
- July 7 – General Electric applies to patent an electric toaster invented by Frank E. Shailor in the United States and produces the GE model D-12, the first commercially successful model.
- July 23 – White Star Liner RMS Republic (15,400 tons), sinking following a collision off Nantucket, becomes the first ship in history to issue a CQD distress signal, using Marconi wireless telegraphy.
- July 25 – Louis Bleriot is the first man to fly across the English Channel in a heavier-than-air craft.
- Kinemacolor, the first commercial "natural color" system for movies is invented.
- Johann Stumpf popularises the uniflow steam engine.

== Events ==
- June 26 – The Science Museum, London is established as an institution in its own right.
- Commencement of fieldwork for the multidisciplinary Clare Island Survey (Ireland), under the direction of Robert Lloyd Praeger.

== Awards ==
- Nobel Prizes
  - Physics – Guglielmo Marconi, Karl Ferdinand Braun
  - Chemistry – Wilhelm Ostwald
  - Medicine – Emil Theodor Kocher

== Births ==
- January 5 – Stephen Cole Kleene (died 1994), American mathematician.
- February 9 – Giulio Racah (died 1965), Italian–Israeli mathematician and physicist.
- February 18 – Warren Elliot Henry (died 2001), American physicist.
- March 22 – Nathan Rosen (died 1995), Jewish American physicist.
- April 13 – Stanislaw Ulam (died 1984), Polish American mathematician.
- April 22 – Rita Levi-Montalcini (died 2012), Italian Jewish neurologist, recipient of the Nobel Prize in Physiology or Medicine.
- May 7 – Edwin H. Land (died 1991), American inventor and founder of Polaroid.
- September 14 – Peter Scott (died 1989), English conservationist.
- August 1 – Sibyl M. Rock (died 1981), American mathematician.
- November 24 – Gerhard Gentzen (died 1945), German-born mathematician.
- December 11 – Toshiko Yuasa (died 1980), Japanese nuclear physicist.
- December 14 – Edward Lawrie Tatum (died 1975), American geneticist, recipient of the Nobel Prize in Physiology or Medicine.

== Deaths ==
- January 12 – Hermann Minkowski (born 1864), German mathematician.
- February 26 – Hermann Ebbinghaus (born 1850), German psychologist.
- July 11 – Simon Newcomb (born 1835), Canadian American astronomer.
- August 14 – William Stanley (born 1829), English inventor.
- August 27 – Emil Christian Hansen (born 1842), Danish fermentation physiologist.
- October 19 – Cesare Lombroso (born 1835), Italian forensic psychiatrist.
