= 1847 in archaeology =

Below are notable events in archaeology that occurred in 1847.

== Explorations ==
- Austen Henry Layard begins his examination of Nineveh which continue until 1851.

== Publications ==
- Antiquités Celtiques et antédiluviennes, vol. 1, by Jacques Boucher de Crèvecœur de Perthes.
- The History of the Conquest of Peru by William H. Prescott.

== Births ==
- June 9 – John Romilly Allen, British archaeologist (d. 1907)

== See also ==
- List of years in archaeology
- 1846 in archaeology
- 1848 in archaeology
