= 1843 in archaeology =

Below are notable events in archaeology that occurred in 1843.

== Excavations ==
- Paul-Émile Botta begins excavations at Khorsabad.
- Amateur excavations of Jordan Hill Roman Temple in Dorset, England.

== Finds ==
- Tomb of Menecrates (c. 600 BCE) on Corfu.
- Sarre Anglo-Saxon cemetery in Kent, England.

== Publications ==
- Incidents of Travel in Yucatan by John Lloyd Stephens with illustrations by Frederick Catherwood
- The History of the Conquest of Mexico by William H. Prescott
- Mittelitalien vor den Zeiten der römischen Herrschaft, nach den Denkmälern by Wilhelm Ludwig Abeken

== Events ==
- c. January: The Singapore Stone is blown up.
- September: The Alexander Mosaic is moved from Pompeii to Naples.
- British Archaeological Association founded.
- Edward Simpson begins forgery of stone implements in England.

== Births ==
- June 4 - Charles Conrad Abbott, American archaeologist and naturalist (d. 1919)
- September 9 - Oscar Montelius, Swedish archaeologist (d. 1921)

== Deaths ==
- January 29 - Wilhelm Ludwig Abeken, German Classical archaeologist (b. 1813)
- June 4 - Ippolito Rosellini, Tuscan Egyptologist (b. 1800)

== See also ==
- List of years in archaeology
- 1842 in archaeology
- 1844 in archaeology
