= 1841 in archaeology =

Below are notable events in archaeology that occurred in 1841.

== Excavations ==
- Kyriakos Pittakis carries out the first excavations at Mycenae.

== Publications ==
- Biblical Researches in Palestine, the Sinai, Petrae and Adjacent Regions by Edward Robinson, based on his survey conducted over several years, proposes identification of Biblical names with modern sites.
- Incidents of Travel in Central America, Chiapas, and Yucatan by John Lloyd Stephens, illustrated by Frederick Catherwood, provides much more accurate information on the ruins of the Maya civilization than previous publications and generates international interest in the subject.

== Births ==
- Alexander Stuart Murray - Scottish archaeologist and museum curator (died 1904)

== See also ==
- List of years in archaeology
- 1840 in archaeology
- 1842 in archaeology
