= 1930 in science =

The year 1930 in science and technology involved some significant events, listed below.

== Astronomy and space exploration ==
- January 15 – The Moon moves into perigee at the same time as the lunar phase reaches its fullest. This is the closest Moon distance to Earth (at 356,397 km) in 23 years and it will not come closer until 2257.
- February 18 – Pluto is identified by Clyde Tombaugh from photographs taken during January at the Lowell Observatory.
- Bernhard Schmidt invents the Schmidt Camera.

== Atmospheric sciences ==
- January 30 – Pavel Molchanov launches a radiosonde from Pavlovsk in the Soviet Union.
- Sydney Chapman explains the ozone-oxygen cycle, the process by which ozone is continually regenerated in Earth's stratosphere.

== Botany ==
- Elena Ivanovna Barulina produces the first study of the international distribution of lentils.

== Chemistry ==
- April 17 – Neoprene is invented by DuPont.

== History of science ==
- Soviet Orientalist Vasily Vasilievich Struve, with Boris Turaev, provides solutions to the problems in the Moscow Mathematical Papyrus.
- The University of Florence in Italy creates the Istituto di Storia della Scienza con annesso Museo (Institute of the History of Science and attached Museum), predecessor of the Museo Galileo.
- The Edwin Smith Papyrus, an ancient Egyptian medical text, is translated for the first time.

== Mathematics ==
- Vojtěch Jarník first discovers 'Prim's algorithm'.
- Kazimierz Kuratowski characterizes his planar graph theorem.
- Bartel van der Waerden publishes Moderne Algebra.

== Medicine ==
- March 5 – Danish painter Einar Wegener begins to undergo sexual reassignment surgery in Germany and takes the name Lili Elbe.
- July 10 – Mental Treatment Act 1930 in the United Kingdom provides for free voluntary treatment for psychiatric conditions and for psychiatric outpatient clinics, replaces the term "asylum" with "mental hospital" and reorganises the Board of Control for Lunacy and Mental Deficiency.
- November 25 – Cecil George Paine, a pathologist at the Sheffield Royal Infirmary in England, achieves the first recorded cure (of an eye infection) using penicillin.
- DPT vaccine (against diphtheria, tetanus and pertussis) is first used.

== Physics ==
- December 4 – Wolfgang Pauli postulates the existence of the particle later identified as the electron neutrino.

== Technology ==
- August 18 – Salginatobel Bridge in Switzerland, designed by Robert Maillart, opened.
- November 13 – Rotolactor rotating platform milking machine first operates.

== Zoology ==
- Israel Aharoni collects golden hamsters near Aleppo from which all modern domesticated specimens will be bred.

== Awards ==
- Lyell Medal (Geological Society of London) – Frederick Chapman
- Nobel Prizes
  - Physics – C. V. Raman
  - Chemistry – Hans Fischer
  - Physiology or Medicine – Karl Landsteiner

== Births ==
- January 9 – Jacob T. Schwartz (died 2009), American mathematician and professor of computer science at the New York University Courant Institute of Mathematical Sciences.
- January 13 – Harold Furth (died 2002), Austrian-born expert in plasma physics and nuclear fusion.
- January 20 – Buzz Aldrin, American astronaut, lunar module pilot on Apollo 11.
- February 7 – Ikutaro Kakehashi (died 2017), Japanese electronic music engineer.
- February 23 – Goro Shimura (died 2019), Japanese mathematician.
- February 28 – Leon Cooper, American physicist and Nobel Prize winner.
- March 7 – Daphne Osborne (died 2006), British botanist.
- March 15 – Martin Karplus (died 2024), Austrian-born theoretical chemist and Nobel Prize winner.
- April 9 – Nathaniel Branden (died 2014), Canadian American psychotherapist.
- April 16 – Louis Herman (died 2016), American marine biologist, investigator in animal communication.
- April 20 – Gordon Hamilton Fairley (killed 1975), British oncologist.
- May 9 – Susan Leeman, American neuroendocrinologist.
- May 11 – Edsger W. Dijkstra (died 2002), Dutch computer scientist.
- May 28 – Frank Drake (died 2022), American radio astronomer, pioneer in SETI
- June 2 – Pete Conrad (died 1999), American astronaut.
- June 22 – Yury Artyukhin (died 1998), Soviet Russian cosmonaut.
- June 28 – William C. Campbell, Irish-born parasitologist and Nobel Prize winner.
- August 5 – Neil Armstrong (died 2012), American astronaut, first person to walk on the Moon.
- August 7 – Joe Farman (died 2013), British geophysicist working for the British Antarctic Survey.
- September 7 – Yuan Longping (died 2021), Chinese agronomist.
- September 12 – Akira Suzuki, Japanese chemist and Nobel Prize winner.
- September 24 – John Young (died 2018), American astronaut.
- October 10 – Yves Chauvin (died 2015), Belgian-born chemist and Nobel Prize winner.
- October 17 – Robert Atkins (died 2003), American nutritionist.
- October 27 – Gladys West, née Gladys Mae Brown (died 2026), African American mathematician.
- October 31 – Michael Collins (died 2021), American astronaut.
- November 11 – Mildred Dresselhaus, née Spiewak (died 2017), American nanotechnologist.
- November 14 – Ed White (died in training accident 1967), American astronaut.
- December 15 – Henri B. Kagan, French chemist and Nobel Prize winner.
- December 17 – Dorothy Rowe, née Conn (died 2019), Australian psychologist.
- December 30
  - Roy Yorke Calne (died 2024), English surgeon, pioneer of transplantation.
  - Tu Youyou, Chinese pharmaceutical chemist and Nobel Prize winner.

== Deaths ==
- January 13 – Sebastian Ziani de Ferranti (born 1864), British-born electrical engineer and inventor.
- January 19 – Frank P. Ramsey (born 1903), English mathematician (jaundice).
- August 6 – Joseph Le Bel (born 1847), French chemist.
- August 15 – Florian Cajori (born 1859), Swiss-born American historian of mathematics.
- August 18 – Gabrielle Howard (born 1876), British plant physiologist.
- October 15
  - Herbert Henry Dow (born 1866), Canadian American industrial chemist.
  - E. H. "Chinese" Wilson (born 1876), English plant collector.
- September 1 – Peeter Põld (born 1878), Estonian politician and pedagogical scientist.
- October 27 – Ellen Hayes (born 1851), American mathematician and astronomer.
- November 5 – Christiaan Eijkman (born 1858), Dutch physiologist.
- December 25 – Albertina Carlsson (born 1848), Swedish zoologist.
