= 1842 in archaeology =

Below are notable events in archaeology that occurred in 1842.

== Explorations ==
- Site of Masada discovered.
- Karl Richard Lepsius begins an expedition to Egypt and the Sudan commissioned by King Frederick William IV of Prussia.

== Publications ==
- W. F. Ainsworth publishes the first report on Üçayak Byzantine Church.
- Karl Lepsius produces the first modern list of pyramids.
- David Roberts begins publication of The Holy Land, Syria, Idumea, Arabia, Egypt, and Nubia (chromolithographs).
- First known use of the term "Industrial archaeology".

== Births ==
- 12 January: Teoberto Maler, Mayanist

== See also ==
- List of years in archaeology
- 1841 in archaeology
- 1843 in archaeology
