= 1847 in science =

The year 1847 in science and technology involved some significant events, listed below.

== Astronomy ==
- July 1 – German amateur astronomer Karl Ludwig Hencke discovers asteroid 6 Hebe from Driesen.
- August 13 – English astronomer John Russell Hind discovers asteroid 7 Iris from London.
- October 18 – J. R. Hind discovers asteroid 8 Flora from London.
- October 1 – American astronomer Maria Mitchell discovers comet C/1847 T1; it is independently discovered two days later by Francesco de Vico from Rome.
- A new edition of the astrometric star catalogue Histoire céleste française is published, from which the Lalande star reference numbers which continue in use are derived.

== Chemistry ==
- Nitroglycerin, at first called pyroglycerine, first synthesized by Ascanio Sobrero.
- Hermann Kolbe obtains acetic acid from completely inorganic sources, further disproving vitalism.
- J. S. Fry & Sons of Bristol (England) produce a moulded chocolate bar.

== Earth sciences ==
- October – Last volcanic eruption of Mount Guntur in West Java.

== Mathematics ==
- George Boole formalizes symbolic logic in the pamphlet The Mathematical Analysis of Logic (published in Cambridge), defining what is now called Boolean algebra.
- Johann Benedict Listing publishes Vorstudien zur Topologie in Göttingen, first introducing the term Topology in print.

== Medicine ==
- January 1 – Britain's first Medical Officer of Health is appointed, Dr. William Henry Duncan in Liverpool.
- November 4–8 – James Young Simpson discovers the anesthetic properties of chloroform and first uses it, successfully, on a patient, in an obstetric case in Edinburgh.
- Émile Küss and Charles-Emmanuel Sédillot perform the first recorded biopsies on neoplasms.
- Ignaz Semmelweis studies and prevents the transmission of puerperal fever.
- The journal Archiv für pathologische Anatomie und Physiologie und für klinische Medicin is founded by Rudolf Virchow and Benno Reinhardt.
- Joseph-François Malgaigne publishes Traité des fractures et des luxations in Paris.

== Physics ==
- Hermann von Helmholtz formally states the law of conservation of energy.

== Technology ==
- January 27 – Institution of Mechanical Engineers founded in the Queen's Hotel next to Curzon Street railway station in Birmingham, England, by George Stephenson and others.
- May 24 – The Dee bridge disaster: a cast iron girder bridge across the river Dee at Chester, England, designed by Robert Stephenson for the Chester and Holyhead Railway, collapses under a Shrewsbury and Chester Railway train with five fatalities.
- July 24 – Richard March Hoe patents a rotary printing press in the United States.
- Squire Whipple publishes A Work on Bridge Building in the United States.

== Zoology ==
- August 18 – American missionary Thomas S. Savage and anatomist Jeffries Wyman first describe the great ape species Troglodytes gorilla, known in modern times as the western gorilla, to the Boston Society of Natural History.

== Awards ==
- Copley Medal: John Herschel.
- Wollaston Medal for Geology: Ami Boué.

== Births ==
- January 21 – Joseph Le Bel, French stereochemist (died 1930)
- February 11 – Thomas Edison, American inventor (died 1931)
- March 3 – Alexander Graham Bell, Scottish-born inventor (died 1922)
- March 25 – Fernand Lataste, French zoologist (died 1934)
- May 1 – Hildegard Björck, Swedish-born pioneer of women's medical education (died 1920)
- September 8 – Abraham Groves, Canadian surgeon (died 1935)
- September 11 – Mary Watson Whitney, American astronomer and academic (died 1921)
- Sydney Mary Thompson, Irish-born geologist and botanist (died 1923)

== Deaths ==
- March 9 – Mary Anning, English paleontologist (born 1799)
- April 9 – Filip Neriusz Walter, Polish organic chemist (born 1810)
- June 7 – David Mushet, Scottish-born metallurgist (born 1772)
- September 3 – Simon Goodrich, English-born mechanical engineer (born 1773)
- October 3 – Charles Hatchett, English chemist (born 1765)
- November 11 – Johann Friedrich Dieffenbach, German plastic surgeon (born 1792)
- December 7 – Robert Liston, Scottish-born surgeon (born 1794)
