= 1842 in science =

The year 1842 in science and technology involved some significant events, listed below.

== Biochemistry ==
- October 5 – Josef Groll brews the first pilsner light lager beer in the city of Pilsen, Bohemia (modern-day Czech Republic).

== Botany ==
- Nathaniel Bagshaw Ward publishes On the Growth of Plants in Closely Glazed Cases in London, promoting his concept of the Wardian case.

== Exploration ==
- Antarctic explorer James Clark Ross charts the eastern side of James Ross Island and on January 23 reaches a Farthest South of 78°09'30"S.

== Medicine ==
- January – American medical student William E. Clarke of Berkshire Medical College becomes the first person to administer an inhaled anesthetic to facilitate a surgical procedure. After Clarke uses a towel and ether to anesthetize a patient identified as "Miss Hobbie", Dr. Elijah Pope carries out a dental extraction.
- March 30 – American physician and pharmacist Crawford Long administers an inhaled anesthetic (diethyl ether) to facilitate a surgical procedure (removal of a neck tumor).
- English surgeon William Bowman publishes On the Structure and Use of the Malpighian Bodies of the Kidney, identifying Bowman's capsule, a key component of the nephron.
- Edwin Chadwick's critical Report on an inquiry into the Sanitary Condition of the Labouring Population of Great Britain is published by the Poor Law Commission.

== Paleontology ==
- British palaeontologist Richard Owen coins the name Dinosauria, hence the Anglicized dinosaur.

== Physics ==
- Christian Doppler proposes the Doppler effect.
- Julius Robert von Mayer proposes that work and heat are equivalent. This is independently discovered in 1843 by James Prescott Joule, who names it "mechanical equivalent of heat".

== Technology ==
- January 8 – Delft University of Technology established by William II of the Netherlands as a 'Royal Academy for the education of civilian engineers'.
- February 21 – John Greenough is granted the first U.S. patent for the sewing machine.
- June – James Nasmyth patents his design of steam hammer in England and introduces an improved planing machine.
- John Herschel discovers the cyanotype (blueprint) photographic process in England.
- The Lancashire Loom, a semi-automatic power loom for weaving cotton fabric, is invented by James Bullough and William Kenworthy in Blackburn (England).

== Events ==
- September 14–17 – English naturalist Charles Darwin and his family settle at Down House in Kent.

== Awards ==
- Copley Medal: James MacCullagh
- Wollaston Medal: Leopold von Buch

== Births ==
- February 2 – Julian Sochocki (died 1927), Polish mathematician.
- February 10 – Agnes Mary Clerke (died 1907) Irish astronomer and author.
- February 22 – Camille Flammarion (died 1925), French astronomer.
- March 17 – Rosina Heikel (died 1929), Finnish physician.
- March 23 – Susan Jane Cunningham (died 1921), American mathematician.
- April 4 – Édouard Lucas (died 1891, French mathematician.
- May 7 – Isala Van Diest (died 1916), Belgian physician.
- May 8 – Emil Christian Hansen (died 1909), Danish fermentation physiologist.
- June 11 – Carl von Linde (died 1934), German refrigeration engineer.
- August 23 – Osborne Reynolds (died 1912), Irish-born physicist.
- September 9 – Elliott Coues (died 1899), American ornithologist.
- September 20
  - James Dewar (died 1923), Scottish-born chemist.
  - Charles Lapworth (died 1920), English geologist.
- October 17 – Gustaf Retzius (died 1919), Swedish anatomist.
- October 24 (O.S. October 12) – Nikolai Menshutkin (died 1907), Russian chemist.
- November 12 – John William Strutt, 3rd Baron Rayleigh (died 1919), English Nobel Prize-winning physicist.
- December 3 – Ellen Swallow Richards (d. 1911), American chemist.
- December 17 – Sophus Lie (died 1899), Norwegian mathematician.

== Deaths ==
- February 15 – Archibald Menzies (born 1754), Scottish-born botanist.
- April 28 – Charles Bell (born 1774), Scottish-born anatomist.
- May 8 – Jules Dumont d'Urville (born 1790), French explorer.
- June 9 – Maria Dalle Donne (born 1778), Bolognese physician
- June 30 – Thomas Coke, Earl of Leicester (born 1754), English agriculturalist and geneticist.
- July 19 – Pierre Joseph Pelletier (born 1788), French chemist.
- July 25 – Dominique Jean Larrey (born 1766), French military surgeon, pioneer of battlefield medicine.
