= 1851 in science =

The year 1851 in science and technology involved some significant events, listed below.

== Astronomy ==
- February – First public exhibition of a Foucault pendulum, at the Meridian of the Paris Observatory, demonstrating the Earth's rotation. A few weeks later Foucault installs one at the Panthéon.

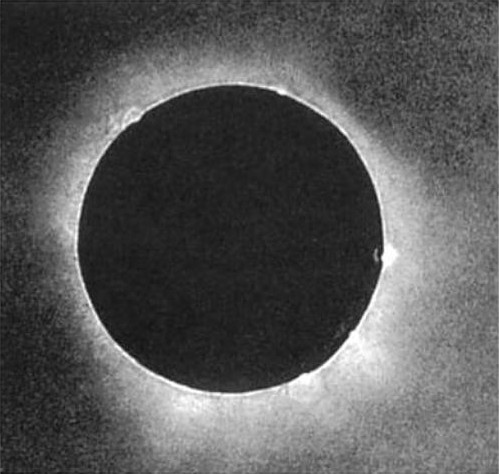
Solar eclipse of July 28, 1851: the first correctly exposed photograph of a solar eclipse, using the daguerreotype process.

- July 28 – Solar eclipse of July 28, 1851: Total solar eclipse. The first correctly exposed photograph, a daguerreotype, of the solar corona is made during the total phase of the eclipse by Berkowski at Koenigsberg Observatory in Prussia. Astronomers Robert Grant and William Swan (of the United Kingdom) and Karl Ludwig von Littrow (of Austria) observe this eclipse and determine that solar prominences are part of the Sun because the Moon is seen to cover and uncover them as it moves in front.
- October 24 – Ariel and Umbriel, moons of Uranus, were discovered by William Lassell.
- The William Brydone Jack Observatory is completed at Fredericton, New Brunswick.

== Chemistry ==
- March – English sculptor Frederick Scott Archer makes public the wet plate collodion photographic process.
- Julius Pintsch produces Pintsch gas.
- Charles-Adolphe Wurtz produces compound ureas.

== History of science and technology ==
- George Wilson publishes The Life of the Hon. Henry Cavendish.

== Mathematics ==
- Eugène Prouhet first applies the Thue–Morse sequence to number theory.
- Bernhard Riemann provides a proof of Green's theorem in his inaugural dissertation.

== Medicine ==
- The Royal Marsden is established as the Free Cancer Hospital by surgeon William Marsden in London, the world's first specialist cancer hospital.
- The Keratometer is invented by the German physiologist Hermann von Helmholtz.

== Physics ==
- Hippolyte Fizeau carries out the Fizeau experiment to measure the relative speeds of light in moving water.

== Technology ==
- November 13 – First protected submarine telegraph cable laid, across the English Channel.
- William Armstrong introduces the weight-loaded hydraulic accumulator.

== Awards ==
- Copley Medal: Richard Owen
- Wollaston Medal for geology: Adam Sedgwick

== Births ==
- January 19 – Jacobus Kapteyn (died 1922), Dutch astronomer.
- February 15 – Spiru Haret (died 1912), Romanian mathematician, astronomer and politician.
- March 16 – Martinus Beijerinck (died 1931), Dutch microbiologist and botanist.
- April 12 – E. Walter Maunder (died 1928), English astronomer.
- July 8 – Arthur Evans (died 1941), English archaeologist.
- July 20 – Arnold Pick (died 1924), Jewish Czech neurologist.
- August 3 – George FitzGerald (died 1901), Irish mathematician.
- September 21 – Fanny Searls (died 1939), American doctor and botanist.
- September 23 – Ellen Hayes (died 1930), American mathematician and astronomer.

== Deaths ==
- January 27 – John James Audubon (born 1785), naturalist and illustrator.
- February 18 – Carl Gustav Jakob Jacobi (born 1804), mathematician.
- March 9 – Hans Christian Ørsted (born 1777), physicist.
- July 6 – Thomas Davenport (born 1802), electrical engineer.
- July 17 – John Farey (born 1791), mechanical engineer and technical writer.
- September 2 – William Nicol (born 1770), geologist.
