= 1900 in science =

The year 1900 in science and technology involved some significant events, listed below.

== Aeronautics ==
- July 2 – The first rigid airship flight is made by the LZ1 designed by Ferdinand von Zeppelin.
- c. October 3 – The Wright brothers begin their first manned glider experimental flights at Kitty Hawk, North Carolina; their first few attempts fail.

== Chemistry ==
- Moses Gomberg identifies the first organic radical (according to the modern definition), triphenylmethyl radical.
- Johannes Rydberg refines the expression for observed hydrogen line wavelengths.

== Earth sciences ==
- January 5 – Physicist Dr Henry A. Rowland of Johns Hopkins University in Baltimore announces his theory that the cause of Earth's magnetic field is its own rotation, based on experiments to produce magnetism by the rotation of a motor.
- Richard Dixon Oldham distinguishes between primary, secondary and tertiary waveforms as recorded by seismometers.

== Exploration ==
- February 16 – The British-sponsored Southern Cross Expedition led by Carsten Borchgrevink achieves a new Farthest South of 78° 50'S, making the first landing at the Great Ice Barrier.
- American explorer Robert Peary first sights Kaffeklubben Island, the northernmost point of land on Earth.

== Genetics ==
- Hugo de Vries publishes the results of his experiments in Mendelian inheritance.

== Mathematics ==
- Max Dehn introduces two examples of Dehn plane and the Dehn invariant.
- David Hilbert states his list of 23 problems which show where some further mathematical work is needed.
- Russell's paradox is first discovered by Ernst Zermelo but he does not publish it, and it is known only to Hilbert, Husserl and other members of the University of Göttingen.
- Gaston Tarry confirms Euler's conjecture that no 6×6 orthogonal Graeco-Latin square is possible.
- Alfred Young introduces the Young tableau.

== Medicine ==
- English surgeon and ophthalmologist Edward Treacher Collins describes the essential traits of Treacher Collins syndrome.
- German gynecologist Hermann Johannes Pfannenstiel publishes his description of the "Pfannenstiel incision", a transverse incision used in genitourinary surgery that continues to be widely used.

== Paleontology ==
- Barnum Brown finds the first partial skeleton of Tyrannosaurus rex in eastern Wyoming.
- Dr. James K. Hampson identifies the Island 35 Mastodon skeleton in the Mississippi River.

== Photography ==
- Kodak introduce their first Brownie (camera).

== Physics ==
- April 26 – Guglielmo Marconi patents the tuned circuit.
- 6-10 August The first International Congress of Physics is held in Paris
  - Pyotr Lebedev presents first experimental evidence of radiation pressure during the conference
- October 7 – Max Planck hosts fellow physicist Heinrich Rubens for tea and considers news that Rubens' experiments have contradicted Planck's theories. Later this evening, Planck reviews and refines his calculations to what will be announced on October 19 as Planck's law.
- October 19 – Max Planck first states Planck's law of black-body radiation to a meeting of the German Physical Society in Berlin, marking the birth of modern quantum mechanics.
- December 14 – Max Planck restates his law, utilising the Planck postulate, at a meeting of the German Physical Society.
- December 23 – Reginald Fessenden, experimenting with a high-frequency spark transmitter, successfully transmits speech over a distance of about 1.6 kilometers (one mile), from Cobb Island, Maryland, which appears to have been the first audio radio transmission.
- Gamma rays discovered by Paul Villard while studying uranium decay.

== Physiology ==
- Karl Landsteiner makes the first discovery of blood types, identifying the ABO blood group system.
- Carl Rasch coins the term 'polymorphous light eruption'.
- Jōkichi Takamine and Keizo Uenaka discover adrenaline.

== Zoology ==
- Richard J. Ussher and Robert Warren publish The Birds of Ireland.

== Awards ==
- Copley Medal: Marcellin Berthelot

== Births ==
- January 2 – Una Ledingham (died 1965), English physician specialising in diabetes mellitus and pregnancy.
- March 4 – Heinrich Willi (died 1971), Swiss pediatrician.
- March 8 – Howard H. Aiken (died 1973), American computing pioneer.
- March 19 – Frédéric Joliot (died 1958), French physicist.
- March 20 – Amelia Chopitea Villa (died 1942), Bolivia's first female physician.
- April 3 – Albert Ingham (died 1967), English mathematician.
- April 25 – Wolfgang Pauli (died 1958), Austrian-born physicist.
- April 26 – Charles Richter (died 1985), American geophysicist and inventor.
- April 28 – Jan Oort (died 1992), Dutch astronomer.
- May 5 – Helen Redfield (died 1988), American geneticist.
- May 6 – Zheng Ji (died 2010), Chinese biochemist and nutritionist.
- May 10 – Cecilia Payne-Gaposchkin (died 1979), English-born American astronomer and astrophysicist.
- May 22 – Honor Fell (died 1986), English biologist.
- June 3 – Leo Picard (died 1997), German-born Israeli geologist.
- June 24 – Wilhelm Cauer (killed 1945), German mathematician and electronic engineer.
- June 25
  - Zinaida Aksentyeva (died 1969), Ukrainian/Soviet astronomer.
  - Philip D'Arcy Hart (died 2006), English medical researcher, pioneer in tuberculosis treatment.
- June 30 – James Stagg (died 1975) Scottish meteorologist.
- July 9 – Frances McConnell-Mills, born Frances Mary McConnell (died 1975), American toxicologist.
- August 25 – Hans Adolf Krebs (died 1981), German-born medical doctor and biochemist.
- August 26 – Hellmuth Walter (died 1980), German-born engineer and inventor.
- October 2 – Isabella Forshall (died 1989), English pediatric surgeon.
- November 5 – Ethelwynn Trewavas (died 1993), English ichthyologist.
- November 21 – Bettina Warburg (died 1990), German-born American psychiatrist.
- November 26 – Anna Maurizio (died 1993), Swiss biologist.
- December 9 – Joseph Needham (died 1995), English biochemist and writer on the history of science and technology in China.
- December 12 – Mária Telkes (died 1995), Hungarian-American scientist and inventor.
- December 17 – Mary Cartwright (died 1998), English mathematician, one of the first people to analyze a dynamical system with chaos.
- Robina Addis (died 1986), English psychiatric social worker.
- Margaret Altmann (died 1984), German-American biologist.
- Ernest Gibbins (killed 1942), English entomologist.

== Deaths ==
- January 13 – Peter Waage (born 1833), Norwegian chemist.
- January 22 – David E. Hughes (born 1831), British-American inventor.
- March 6 – Gottlieb Daimler (born 1834), German engineer, automotive pioneer.
- March 10 – George James Symons (born 1838), English meteorologist.
- April 1 – George Jackson Mivart (born 1827), English biologist.
- August 4 – Étienne Lenoir (born 1822), Belgian mechanical engineer.
- August 31 – John Bennet Lawes (born 1814), English agricultural scientist.
- September 4 – Charles Harrison Blackley (born 1820), English allergist.
- October 16 – Henry Acland (born 1815), English physician.
- October 29 – Bruno Abakanowicz (born 1852), Polish mathematician, inventor and electrical engineer.
