= 1831 in science =

The year 1831 in science and technology involved some significant events, listed below.

== Astronomy ==
- January 7 – Great Comet of 1831 (C/1831 A1, 1830 II) first observed by John Herapath.
- March 7 – Royal Astronomical Society receives its Royal Charter.
- Heinrich Schwabe makes the first detailed drawing of the Great Red Spot on Jupiter.
- Mary Somerville translates Laplace's Mécanique céleste as The Mechanism of the Heavens.

== Biology ==
- September 1 – Zoological Gardens, Dublin, open in Ireland.
- Robert Brown names the cell nucleus, in a paper to the Linnean Society of London.

== Chemistry ==
- A. A. Bussy publishes his Mémoire sur le Radical métallique de la Magnésie describing his method of isolating magnesium.
- The Kaliapparat, a laboratory device for the analysis of carbon in organic compounds, is invented by Justus von Liebig.

== Exploration ==
- June 1 – British Royal Navy officer James Clark Ross locates the position of the North Magnetic Pole on the Boothia Peninsula.
- December 27 – Charles Darwin starts his voyage on HMS Beagle from Plymouth.

== Medicine ==
- May 16 – Middlesex County Asylum for pauper lunatics opens at Hanwell near London under the humane superintendence of William Charles Ellis.
- Dr C. Turner Thackrah publishes The Effects of the Principal Arts, Trades, and Professions, and of Civic States and Habits of Living, on Health and Longevity, with a particular reference to the trades and manufactures of Leeds, and suggestions for the removal of many of the agents which produce disease and shorten the duration of life, a pioneering study of occupational and public health in a newly industrialised English city.

== Paleontology ==
- Henry Witham publishes Observations on fossil vegetables, accompanied by representations of their internal structure, as seen through the microscope in Edinburgh.

== Technology ==
- April 12 – Broughton Suspension Bridge over the River Irwell in England collapses under marching troops.
- August 29 – Michael Faraday demonstrates electromagnetic induction at the Royal Society of London. Joseph Henry recognises it at about the same time.
- October 28 – Faraday develops the Faraday Wheel, a homopolar generator.
- Joseph Henry invents the electric bell.
- James Meadows Rendel erects the first bascule bridge with a hydraulic mechanism, on the Kingsbridge Estuary in England.
- William Wallace invents the eidograph.

== Institutions ==
- September 27 – British Association for the Advancement of Science first meets, in York.

== Awards ==
- Copley Medal: George Biddell Airy
- Wollaston Medal (first award): William Smith

== Births ==
- January 20 – Edward Routh (died 1907), Canadian-born English mathematician.
- January 26 – Heinrich Anton de Bary (died 1888), German surgeon, botanist, microbiologist and mycologist.
- February 28 – Edward James Stone (died 1897), English astronomer.
- March 3 – George Pullman (died 1897), American inventor.
- May 16 – David E. Hughes (died 1900), British inventor.
- June 13 – James Clerk Maxwell (died 1879), Scottish-born mathematician.
- August 20 – Eduard Suess (died 1914), Austrian geologist.
- October 6 – Richard Dedekind (died 1916), German mathematician.
- October 15 – Isabella Bird (died 1904), English explorer, writer, photographer and naturalist.
- October 21 – Hermann Hellriegel (died 1895), German agricultural chemist, discoverer of the mechanism by which leguminous plants assimilate the free nitrogen of the atmosphere.
- October 29 – Othniel Charles Marsh (died 1899), American paleontologist.
- December 5 – Hans Heinrich Landolt (died 1910), Swiss-born chemist.

== Deaths ==
- February 14 – Henry Maudslay (born 1771), English mechanical engineer.
- March 26 - Pierre Amable Jean-Baptiste Trannoy (born 1772), French physician, hygienist and botanist.
- June 27 – Sophie Germain (born 1776), French mathematician.
- October 14 – Jean-Louis Pons (born 1761), French astronomer.
- December 22 – François Huber (born 1750), blind Swiss naturalist.
