= 1995 in science =

The year 1995 in science and technology involved many significant events, listed below.

== Astronomy and space exploration ==
- February – Project Phoenix begins looking for extraterrestrial transmissions using the Parkes Observatory radio telescope in New South Wales, Australia, the largest telescope in the Southern Hemisphere.
- February 8 – Asteroid 6349 Acapulco is discovered by Masahiro Koishikawa.
- March 22 – Cosmonaut Valeri Polyakov returns after setting a record for 438 days in space.
- July 23 – Comet Hale–Bopp is discovered by Alan Hale and Thomas Bopp independently.
- October 6 – 51 Pegasi b: Didier Queloz and Michel Mayor of the University of Geneva at the Observatoire de Haute-Provence announce the first definitive detection of an extrasolar planet orbiting an ordinary main sequence star (51 Pegasi) and the first "hot Jupiter".
- December 7 – NASA's Galileo Probe enters Jupiter's atmosphere.
- December 18 - 28 Hubble observes its first deep field
- The "Big Ear" at the Ohio State University Radio Observatory ends its full-time search for extraterrestrial intelligence radio survey, having run continuously for 22 years, beginning in 1973.
- Richard P. Binzel devises the original of what will become the Torino Scale for categorizing the impact hazard associated with near-Earth objects.
- The first brown dwarf – Teide 1 – is discovered.

== Biology ==
- March 24 – Patrick Callaerts and colleagues publish the first classic demonstration of the role of the PAX6 gene in the development of eyes.
- The genome of Haemophilus influenzae is the first genome of a free living organism to be sequenced.
- Sudden oak death, the tree disease caused by the plant pathogen Phytophthora ramorum, is first observed, in California, United States.

== Computer science ==
- January 27 – Prodigy (online service) offers access to the World Wide Web.
- March 1 – The first Yahoo! Search interface is founded.
- March 25 – Ward Cunningham loads the first wiki software, WikiWikiWeb, in Oregon.
- April 30 – The United States government stops funding the NSFNET, making the Internet a wholly privatized system.
- May 23 – The Java programming language is announced to the world.
- June 8 – Danish/Greenlandic/Canadian programmer Rasmus Lerdorf releases the first version of the scripting language PHP, which in 15 years will be used as the server-side language on 75% of all Web servers.
- July 16 – Amazon.com, incorporated a year earlier by Jeff Bezos in Washington (state) as an online bookstore, sells its first book, Douglas Hofstadter's Fluid Concepts and Creative Analogies: Computer Models of the Fundamental Mechanisms of Thought.
- November 22 – Toy Story, the first feature film created using only computer-generated imagery, is released in theaters in the United States.
- Andy Harter and colleagues devise Virtual Network Computing.

== Earth sciences ==
- Bruce Luyendyk first proposes the name Zealandia for a southern continent.

== Mathematics ==
- May – Wiles's proof of Fermat's Last Theorem is published in Annals of Mathematics.

== Medicine ==
- January 30 – Workers from the National Institutes of Health announce the success of clinical trials testing the first preventive treatment for sickle cell anaemia.
- December 6 – The United States Food and Drug Administration approves Saquinavir, the first protease inhibitor to treat HIV/AIDS. Within 2 years of its approval, annual deaths from AIDS in the United States fall from over 50,000 to approximately 18,000.

== Neuroscience ==
- The RELN gene and Reelin protein are discovered by Gabriella D'Arcangelo and colleagues, solving the mystery behind the formation of "inverted cortical layers" in the brain of reeler mutant mice, and sparking an avalanche of research into the Reelin's role in neurodevelopment.

== Physics ==
- March 2 – Top quark discovery announced.
- Spring – M-theory is conjectured by Edward Witten.

== Psychology ==
- Elizabeth Loftus describes the "Lost in the mall technique" as a demonstration that confabulations can be created through suggestions to experimental subjects.

== Organisations ==
- The first SampTA conference for mathematicians, engineers and applied scientists is held in Riga, Latvia.

== Awards ==
- Nobel Prizes
  - Physics – Martin L. Perl, Frederick Reines
  - Chemistry – Paul J. Crutzen, Mario J. Molina, F. Sherwood Rowland
  - Medicine – Edward B. Lewis, Christiane Nüsslein-Volhard, Eric Wieschaus
  - Peace – Joseph Rotblat
- Turing Award – Manuel Blum
- Wollaston Medal for Geology – George P. L. Walker
- Enshrinement in the Panthéon, Paris – Pierre and Marie Curie
- Spinoza Prize first awarded in the Netherlands.

== Deaths ==
- January 30 – Gerald Durrell (b. 1925), British wildlife conservationist.
- March 24 – Joseph Needham (b. 1900), English biochemist and writer on the history of science and technology in China.
- April 2 – Hannes Alfvén (b. 1908), Swedish astrophysicist.
- June 23 – Jonas Salk (b. 1914), American medical researcher.
- August 11 – Alonzo Church (b. 1903), American mathematician.
- September 13 – A. E. Wilder-Smith (b. 1915), British organic chemist.
- December 2 – Mária Telkes (b. 1900), Hungarian-American scientist and inventor
- December 14 – Constance Tipper (b. 1894), English metallurgist.
- December 18 – Nathan Rosen (b. 1909), American-born Israeli physicist.
