= 1976 in science =

The year 1976 in science and technology involved some significant events, listed below.

== Astronomy and space exploration ==
- March – Faber–Jackson relation presented by astronomers Sandra M. Faber and Robert Earl Jackson.
- June 18 – Gravity Probe A, a satellite-based experiment to test Albert Einstein's theory of general relativity, is launched.
- July 20 – Viking program: The Viking 1 lander successfully lands on Mars.
- July 31 – NASA releases the famous 'Face on Mars' photograph, taken by Viking 1
- August 7 – Viking program: Viking 2 enters into orbit around Mars.
- August 22 – Luna program: Luna 24 successfully makes an unmanned landing on the Moon, the last for 37 years.
- September 3 – Viking program: The Viking 2 spacecraft lands at Utopia Planitia on Mars and takes the first close-up color photographs of the planet's surface.
- September 17 – Space Shuttle Enterprise rolled out.
- Universe, a public domain film produced by Lester Novros for NASA, is released.

== Aviation ==
- January 21 – Concorde begins commercial flights.
- December 8 – First flight of production General Dynamics F-16 Fighting Falcon.

== Chemistry ==
- May – Marion M. Bradford publishes the Bradford protein assay method.
- Oberlin, Endo and Koyama publish evidence of the creation of carbon nanotubes using a vapor-growth technique.

== Computer science ==
- January – The Cray-1, the first commercially developed supercomputer, is released by Seymour Cray's Cray Research. Model 001 is installed at Los Alamos National Laboratory in the United States.
- March – Peter Chen's key paper on the entity–relationship model is published, having first been presented at a conference in September 1975.
- April 1 – Apple Computer Company is formed by Steve Jobs and Steve Wozniak in California and on April 11 they launch their first computer, the Apple I, for the U.S. hobbyist market.
- November 26 – Little-known company Microsoft is officially registered with the Office of the Secretary of State of New Mexico.
- December – Release of Electric Pencil (originated by Michael Shrayer), the first word processor for home computers.

== Cryptography ==
- November – An asymmetric-key cryptosystem is published by Whitfield Diffie and Martin Hellman who disclose the Diffie–Hellman key exchange method of public-key agreement for public-key cryptography.

== History of science and technology ==
- October 3 – Opening of the Dibner Library of the History of Science and Technology at the Smithsonian Institution's National Museum of History and Technology in Washington, D.C.
- Jean Gimpel's The Medieval Machine is published.

== Mathematics ==
- July 11 – Keuffel and Esser manufacture the last slide rule in the United States.
- Imre Lakatos' Proofs and Refutations: the Logic of Mathematical Discovery is published posthumously.
- The four color theorem is proved by Kenneth Appel and Wolfgang Haken, the first major theorem to be proved using a computer.
- Andrei Suslin and Daniel Quillen independently prove the Quillen–Suslin theorem ("Serre's conjecture") about the triviality of algebraic vector bundles on affine space.
- George Andrews locates a long lost manuscript containing over six hundred mathematical formulas by Srinivasa Ramanujan from 1919-1920 in a collection of materials bequeathed by G. N. Watson in the Wren Library of Trinity College, Cambridge.

== Paleontology ==
- Fossil footprints of bipedal hominini from 3.6M years BP are found at Laetoli in Tanzania by Andrew Hill when visiting Mary Leakey.

== Physiology, medicine and psychology ==
- July 27 – Delegates attending an American Legion convention at The Bellevue-Stratford Hotel in Philadelphia, US, begin falling ill with a form of pneumonia: this will eventually be recognised as the first outbreak of Legionnaires' disease and will end in the deaths of 29 attendees.
- August 26 – The Ebola virus first emerges in outbreaks of viral hemorrhagic fever in Yambuku, Zaire, followed by outbreaks in Sudan.
- October 1–December 16 – Program of mass vaccination in the United States against the 1976 swine flu outbreak, suspended due to public fears over side-effects.
- October 28 – British evolutionary biologist Richard Dawkins' book The Selfish Gene is published, introducing the term memetics.
- Dementia with Lewy bodies is first described by Japanese psychiatrist and neuropathologist Kenji Kosaka.
- The term Münchausen syndrome by proxy is first coined by John Money and June Faith Werlwas.
- Norman F. Dixon publishes On the Psychology of Military Incompetence.

== Technology ==
- The first laser printer is introduced by IBM (the IBM 3800).

== Awards ==
- Nobel Prizes
  - Physics – Burton Richter, Samuel C. C. Ting
  - Chemistry – William N. Lipscomb
  - Medicine – Baruch S. Blumberg, Daniel Carleton Gajdusek
- Turing Award – Michael O. Rabin, Dana Scott

== Births ==
- July 27 – Demis Hassabis, British artificial intelligence researcher.
- November 19 – Jack Dorsey, American web developer.

== Deaths ==
- January 19 – Hidetsugu Yagi (b. 1886), Japanese electrical engineer.
- February 1
  - Werner Heisenberg (b. 1901), German theoretical physicist.
  - George Whipple (b. 1878), American pathologist, winner of the Nobel Prize in Physiology or Medicine in 1934.
- April 5 – Wilder Penfield (b. 1891), American-Canadian neurosurgeon.
- April 21 – Carl Benjamin Boyer (b. 1906), American historian of mathematics.
- May 31 – Jacques Monod (b. 1910), French biochemist, winner of the Nobel Prize in Physiology or Medicine in 1965.
- August 18 – Shintaro Uda (b. 1886), Japanese electrical engineer.
- October 5 – Lars Onsager (b. 1903), Norwegian American chemist.
- September 16 – Bertha Lutz (b. 1894), Brazilian herpetologist and women's rights campaigner.
- September 26 – Pál Turán (b. 1910), Hungarian mathematician.
- November 5 – Willi Hennig (b. 1913), German entomologist and pioneer of cladistics.
