= 1942 in science =

The year 1942 in science and technology involved some significant events, listed below.

== Astronomy ==
- February 27 – James Stanley Hey, a British Army research officer, first detects radio waves emitted by the Sun, helping to pioneer radio astronomy.
- October 3 – The first V-2 rocket is successfully launched from Test Stand VII at Peenemünde, Germany, flying a distance of 147 km and reaching a height of 84.5 km, becoming the first man-made object to reach space.

== Biology ==
- German pathologist Max Westenhöfer first puts forward an aquatic ape hypothesis.

== Chemistry ==
- Cyanoacrylate adhesive is invented by Harry Coover of Eastman Kodak.
- Eastman Kodak first market Kodacolor color negative film.

== Computer science ==
- John V. Atanasoff with Clifford Berry successfully test the Atanasoff–Berry Computer, the first electronic digital computing device.

== Mathematics ==
- December – Raphaël Salem and Donald C. Spencer publish a progression-free Salem–Spencer set of the numbers from $1$ to $n$ of size proportional to $n^{1-\varepsilon}$, for every $\varepsilon>0$.

== Physics ==
- August 13 – United States Chief of Engineers, Major General Eugene Reybold formally establishes the 'Manhattan Engineer District' of the Corps of Engineers to undertake production facility construction work for what will become known as the Manhattan Project.
- December 2 – Chicago Pile-1, the first nuclear reactor, goes critical under the squash court of the University of Chicago, thanks to the efforts of Enrico Fermi, Leó Szilárd, George Weil and the rest of the Chicago pile team.

== Physiology and medicine ==
- November 1 – Klinefelter syndrome is first described by American endocrinologist Harry Klinefelter.
- Alfred Gilman, Louis S. Goodman and Frederick S. Philips first carry out trials of anti-cancer chemotherapy, using mechlorethamine.
- The first practical oximeter is described by Glenn Allan Millikan.

== Psychology ==
- Katharine Cook Briggs and her daughter, Isabel Briggs Myers, produce the first Briggs-Myers Type Indicator.

== Technology ==
- March – Isaac Asimov's Three Laws of Robotics are introduced in his short story "Runaround" published in Astounding Science-Fiction.
- July 18 – Messerschmitt Me 262 jet aircraft prototype makes its first flight under jet power.
- August 11 – Composer George Antheil and actress Hedy Lamarr are granted a United States patent for a frequency-hopping spread spectrum communication system intended to make radio-guided torpedoes harder to detect.
- October 2 – The first American-built jet aircraft, the Bell P-59 Airacomet fighter prototype, makes its first official flight.
- November 26 – First operational military Bailey bridge erected by British Royal Engineers over the Medjerda River near Majaz al Bab in Tunisia.
- Walter Bruch operates a closed-circuit television system to monitor the V-2 rocket launches.

== Births ==
- January 8 – Stephen Hawking, English cosmologist and best-selling author of A Brief History of Time (died 2018)
- January 12 – Michel Mayor, Swiss astronomer, recipient of a Nobel Prize in Physics
- January 27 – Tasuku Honjo, Japanese immunologist, recipient of a Nobel Prize in Physiology or Medicine
- February 10 – John Clarke, English-born physicist, recipient of a Nobel Prize in Physics
- March 27 – John Sulston, English molecular biologist, recipient of a Nobel Prize in Physiology or Medicine (died 2018)
- May 24 – Fraser Stoddart, Scottish-born chemist, recipient of a Nobel Prize in Chemistry (died 2024)
- June 8 – Jacques Dubochet, Swiss biophysicist, recipient of a Nobel Prize in Chemistry
- August 24 – Karen Uhlenbeck, American mathematician
- October 20 – Christiane Nüsslein-Volhard, German developmental geneticist, recipient of a Nobel Prize in Physiology or Medicine
- November 14 – Hanna von Hoerner, German astrophysicist (died 2014)
- November 22 – Guion Bluford, African American aerospace engineer and astronaut
- November 30 – André Brahic, French astrophysicist (died 2016)
- December 1 – John Clauser, American quantum physicist, recipient of a Nobel Prize in Physics

== Deaths ==
- March 12 – Sir William Henry Bragg, English recipient of a Nobel Prize in Physics (born 1862)
- March 14 – Friedrich Karl Georg Fedde, German botanist (born 1873)
- May 19 – Joseph Larmor, Irish physicist (born 1857)
- August 6 – Valdemar Poulsen, Danish audio engineer (born 1869)
- August 12 – Sabina Spielrein, Russian psychoanalyst, in Zmievskaya Balka massacre (born 1885)
- September 22 – Isaak Bacharach, German mathematician (born 1854)
- October 5 – Dorothea Klumpke, American astronomer (born 1861)
- October 27 – Alfred Baker, Canadian mathematician (born 1848)
- November 3 – Ernest Gibbins, English entomologist, speared by Ugandan tribesmen amongst whom he was working (born 1900).
- November 5 – Alexis Carrel, French surgeon, biologist and winner of a Nobel Prize in Physiology or Medicine (born 1873)
- November 13 – Robert Remak, German mathematician, in Auschwitz (born 1888)
- December 21 – Franz Boas, German American anthropologist (born 1858)
- Vernon Orlando Bailey, American naturalist (born 1864)
- Amelia Chopitea Villa, Bolivia's first female physician (born 1900)
