= 1973 in science =

The year 1973 in science and technology involved some significant events, listed below.

== Astronomy and space exploration ==
- March 7 – Comet Kohoutek is discovered
- April 6 – Launch of Pioneer 11 spacecraft
- May 14 – Skylab, the United States' first space station, is launched.
- Solar eclipse of June 30, 1973 – Very long total solar eclipse visible in NE South America, the Atlantic, and central Africa. During the entire Second Millennium, only seven total solar eclipses exceed seven minutes of totality; this is the last. Observers aboard a Concorde jet are able to stretch totality to about 74 minutes by flying along the path of the moon's umbra.
- July 25 – Soviet Mars 5 space probe launched.
- November 3 – Mariner program: NASA launches the Mariner 10 toward Mercury (on March 29, 1974, it becomes the first space probe to reach that planet); it will be the first space flight to use gravity assist.
- December 3 – Pioneer program: Pioneer 10 sends back the first close-up images of Jupiter.
- December 7 – The "Big Ear" at the Ohio State University Radio Observatory begins a full-time search for extraterrestrial intelligence (SETI) radio survey, running continuously until 1995.

== Biology ==
- December 28 – Endangered Species Act signed into law in the United States.

== Cartography ==
- Waldo R. Tobler introduces the Tobler hyperelliptical projection.

== Chemistry ==
- A successful method of Vitamin B_{12} total synthesis is reported by the groups of Robert Burns Woodward and Albert Eschenmoser.
- Akira Endo identifies the first statin, mevastatin.

== Computer science ==
- March 1 – Xerox PARC releases the Xerox Alto, the first computer designed to support an operating system based on a graphical user interface.
- September – The TV Typewriter appears on the cover of Radio-Electronics. Designed by Don Lancaster, it is a video terminal that can display two pages of 16 lines of 32 upper case characters on a standard television set.
- October – A form of the suffix automaton is introduced by Peter Weiner.
- November 21 – The sci-fi movie Westworld is the first feature film to use digital image processing.

== Cryptography ==
- October – Asymmetric key algorithms for public-key cryptography developed by James H. Ellis, Clifford Cocks and Malcolm J. Williamson at the United Kingdom Government Communications Headquarters.

== Earth sciences ==
- Derek Ager publishes The Nature of the Stratigraphical Record.

== History of science ==
- May 5–July 28 – BBC Television series The Ascent of Man, written and presented by Jacob Bronowski, first airs; there is also an accompanying bestselling book.

== Mathematics ==
- Fischer Black and Myron Scholes first articulate the Black–Scholes mathematical model used in the financial field containing certain derivative investment instruments.
- Jürgen Stückrad and Wolfgang Vogel introduce the Buchsbaum ring.

== Physiology and medicine ==
- August – Production of monoclonal antibodies involving human–mouse hybrid cells is first described by Jerrold Schwaber.
- The term "dendritic cell" is coined by Ralph M. Steinman working with Zanvil A. Cohn.
- The term "Norrmalmstorgssyndromet", translated as Stockholm syndrome, is coined by Nils Bejerot.

== Psychiatry ==
- David Rosenhan publishes the results of his experiment into the validity of psychiatric diagnosis.
- The American Psychiatric Association publishes the 1st edition of its Principles of Medical Ethics, incorporating the 'Goldwater rule' (that it is unethical for a psychiatrist to offer a professional opinion on an individual in the public eye without an examination and consent).
- December 15 – The American Psychiatric Association removes the definition of homosexuality as a mental disorder from the 2nd edition of its Diagnostic and Statistical Manual of Mental Disorders (DSM-II).

== Technology ==
- April 2 – The LexisNexis computerized legal research service begins.
- April 3 – The first handheld mobile phone call is made by Martin Cooper of Motorola in New York City.
- June 4 – A United States patent for the Docutel automated teller machine is granted to Donald Wetzel, Tom Barnes and George Chastain.
- Ichiro Kato, Waseda University, develops the world's first full-scale humanoid robot, Wabot-1.

== Institutions ==
- March 6 – The Montenegrin Academy of Sciences and Arts, founded as the Montenegrin Society for Science and Arts (Crnogorsko društvo za nauku i umjetnost), elects its first members.

== Awards ==
- Nobel Prizes
  - Physics – Leo Esaki, Ivar Giaever, Brian David Josephson
  - Chemistry – Ernst Otto Fischer, Geoffrey Wilkinson
  - Medicine – Karl Von Frisch, Konrad Lorenz, Nikolaas Tinbergen
- Turing Award – Charles W. Bachman

== Births ==
- May 19 – Alice Roberts, English evolutionary biologist, biological anthropologist and science and archaeology popularizer
- October 5 – Cédric Villani, French mathematician and politician
- November 19 – Nim Chimpsky (d. 2000), chimpanzee
- December 5 – Luboš Motl, Czech theoretical physicist

== Deaths ==
- February 11 – J. Hans D. Jensen (b. 1907), German nuclear physicist
- February 20 – Alf Lysholm (b. 1893), Swedish mechanical engineer.
- March 12 – David Lack (b. 1910), English ornithologist
- March 14 – Howard H. Aiken (b. 1900), American computing pioneer
- March 28 – C. Doris Hellman (b. 1910), American historian of science
- March 30 – William Justin Kroll (b. 1889), Luxembourgish metallurgist
- May 21 – Grigore Moisil (b. 1906), Romanian mathematician, died in Canada
- July 1 – Laurens Hammond (b. 1895), American inventor
- August 9 – Preben von Magnus (b. 1912), Danish virologist
- August 12 – Walter Rudolf Hess (b. 1881), Swiss physiologist, recipient of the Nobel Prize in Physiology or Medicine
- August 16 – Selman Waksman (b. 1888), Ukrainian-born Jewish-American biochemist and microbiologist
- November 25 – Elisa Leonida Zamfirescu (b. 1887), Romanian engineer
- December 10 – Wolf V. Vishniac (b. 1922), American microbiologist
- December 17 – Charles Greeley Abbot (b. 1872), American astrophysicist
