= Convoy =

Group of vehicles traveling together

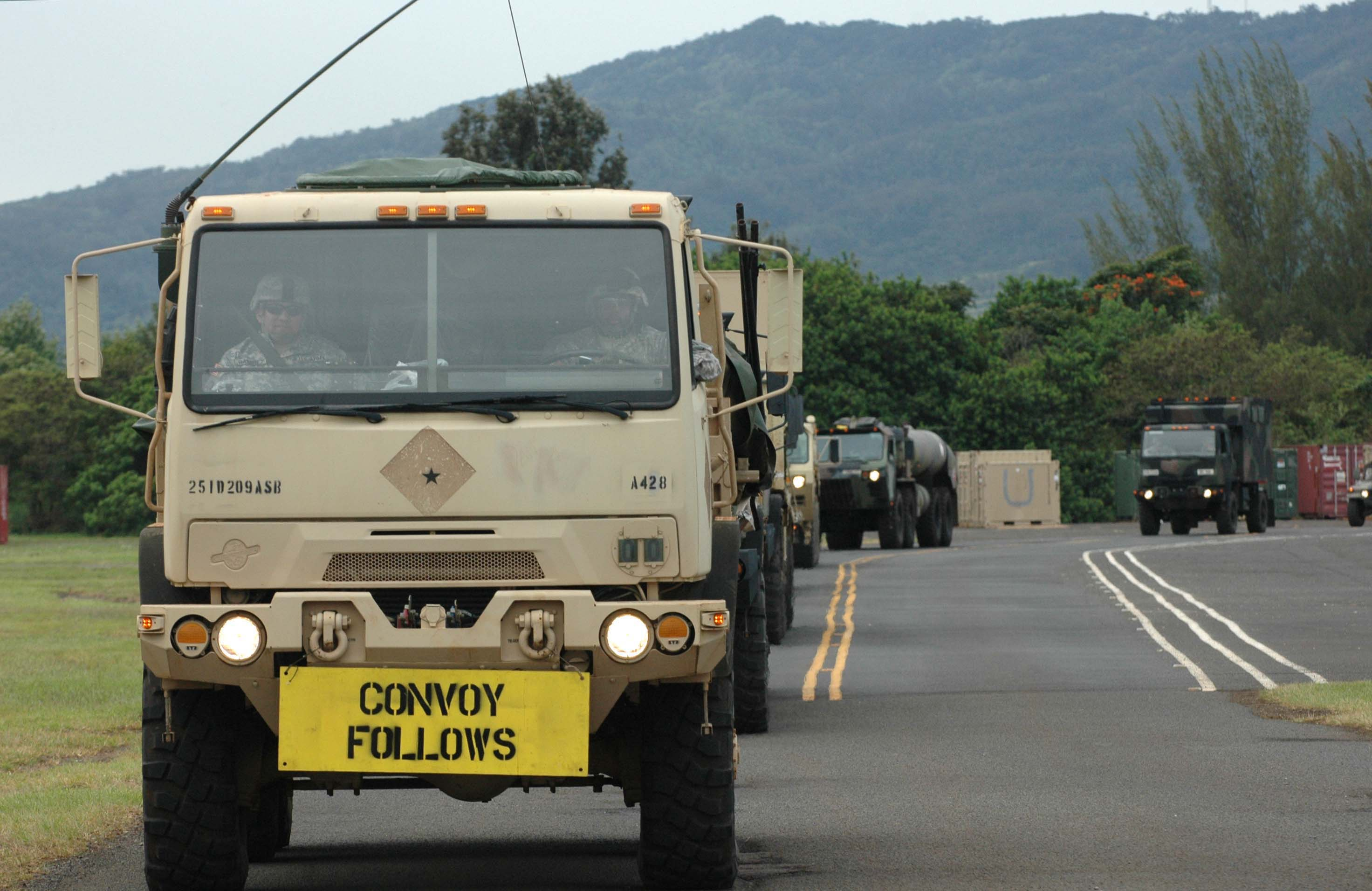
A convoy of U.S. Army trucks in Hawaii

A convoy is a group of vehicles, typically motor vehicles or ships, traveling together for mutual support and protection. Often, a convoy is organized with armed defensive support and can help maintain cohesion within a unit. It may also be used in a non-military sense, for example when driving through remote areas.

== Naval convoys ==
=== Age of Sail ===
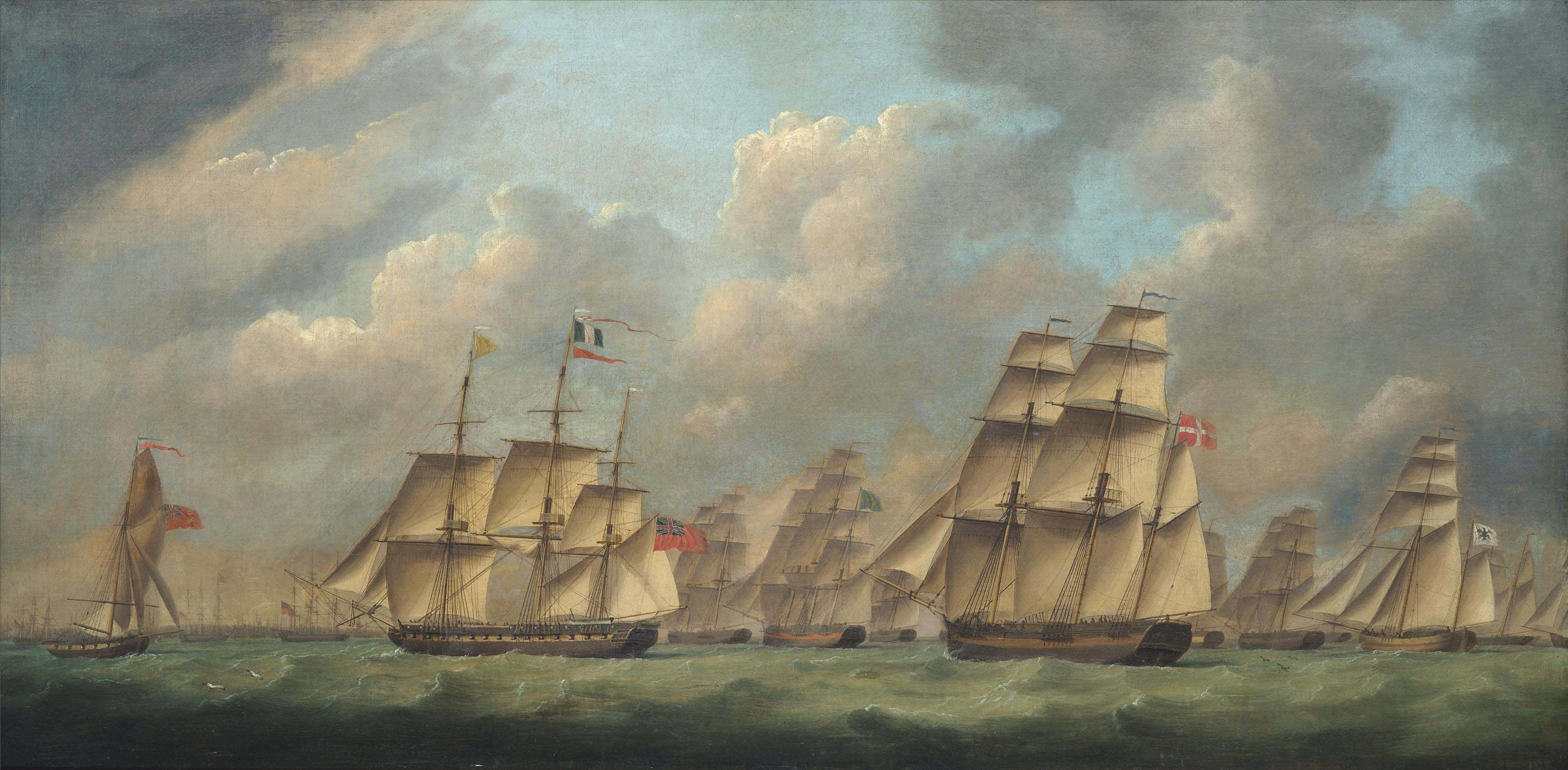
1813 painting of a British frigate escorting a multinational convoy

Naval convoys have been in use for centuries, with examples of merchant ships traveling under naval protection dating to the 12th century. The use of organized naval convoys dates from when ships began to be separated into specialist classes and national navies were established. By the French Revolutionary Wars of the late 18th century, effective naval convoy tactics had been developed to ward off pirates and privateers. Some convoys contained several hundred merchant ships. The most enduring system of convoys were the Spanish treasure fleets, that sailed from the 1520s until 1790.

When merchant ships sailed independently, a privateer could cruise a shipping lane and capture ships as they passed. Ships sailing in convoy presented a much smaller target: a convoy was as hard to find as a single ship. Even if the privateer found a convoy and the wind was favourable for an attack, it could still hope to capture only a handful of ships before the rest managed to escape, and a small escort of warships could easily thwart it. As a result of the convoy system's effectiveness, wartime insurance premiums were consistently lower for ships that sailed in convoys.

Many naval battles in the Age of Sail were fought around convoys, including:

- The Battle of Portland (1653)
- The Battle of Ushant (1781)
- The Battle of Dogger Bank (1781)
- The Glorious First of June (1794)
- The Battle of Pulo Aura (1804)

By the end of the Napoleonic Wars, the Royal Navy had in place a sophisticated convoy system to protect merchant ships. Losses of ships travelling out of convoy, however, were so high that no merchant ship was allowed to sail unescorted.

=== World War I ===
In the early 20th century, the dreadnought changed the balance of power in convoy battles. Steaming faster than merchant ships and firing at long ranges, a single battleship could destroy many ships in a convoy before the others could scatter over the horizon. To protect a convoy against a capital ship required providing it with an escort of another capital ship, at very high opportunity cost (i.e. potentially tying down multiple capital ships to defend different convoys against one opponent ship).

Battleships were the main reason that the British Admiralty did not adopt convoy tactics at the start of the first Battle of the Atlantic in World War I. But the German capital ships had been bottled up in the North Sea, and the main threat to shipping came from U-boats. From a tactical point of view, World War I–era submarines were similar to privateers in the age of sail. These submarines were only a little faster than the merchant ships they were attacking, and capable of sinking only a small number of vessels in a convoy because of their limited supply of torpedoes and shells. The Admiralty took a long time to respond to this change in the tactical position, and in April 1917 convoys were trialled, before being officially introduced in the Atlantic in September 1917.

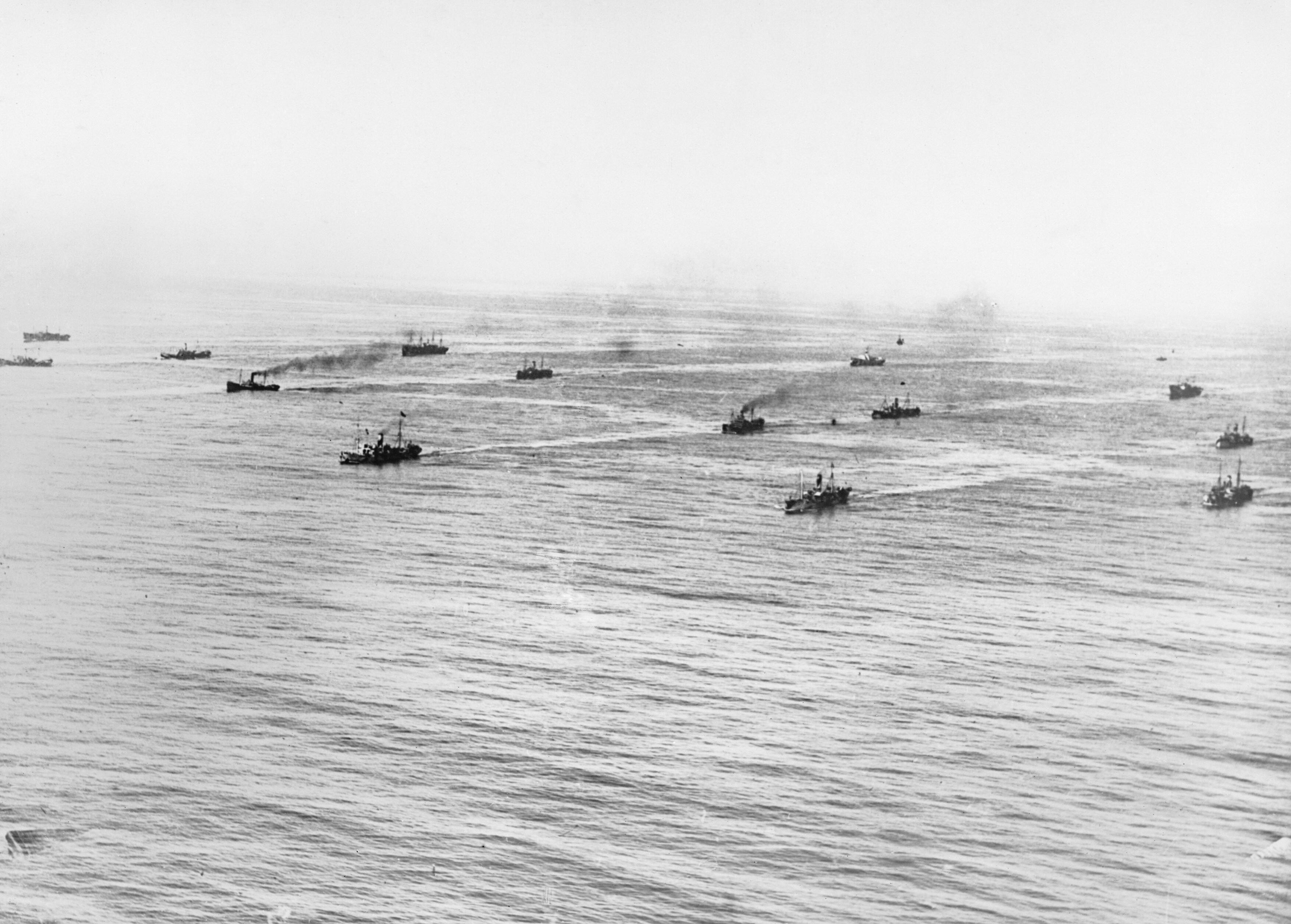
British convoy in the Atlantic during World War I

Other arguments against convoys were raised. The primary issue was the loss of productivity, as merchant shipping in convoy has to travel at the speed of the slowest vessel in the convoy and spent a considerable amount of time in ports waiting for the next convoy to depart. Further, large convoys were thought to overload port resources.

Actual analysis of shipping losses in World War I disproved all these arguments, at least so far as they applied to transatlantic and other long-distance traffic. Ships sailing in convoys were far less likely to be sunk, even when not provided with an escort. The loss of productivity due to convoy delays was small compared with the loss of productivity due to ships being sunk. Ports could deal more easily with convoys because they tended to arrive on schedule and so loading and unloading could be planned.

In his book On the Psychology of Military Incompetence, Norman Dixon suggested that the hostility towards convoys in the naval establishment were in part caused by a (sub-conscious) perception of convoys as effeminating, due to warships having to care for civilian merchant ships. Convoy duty also exposes the escorting warships to the sometimes hazardous conditions of the North Atlantic, with only rare occurrences of visible achievement (i.e. fending off a submarine assault).

=== World War II ===
==== Atlantic ====
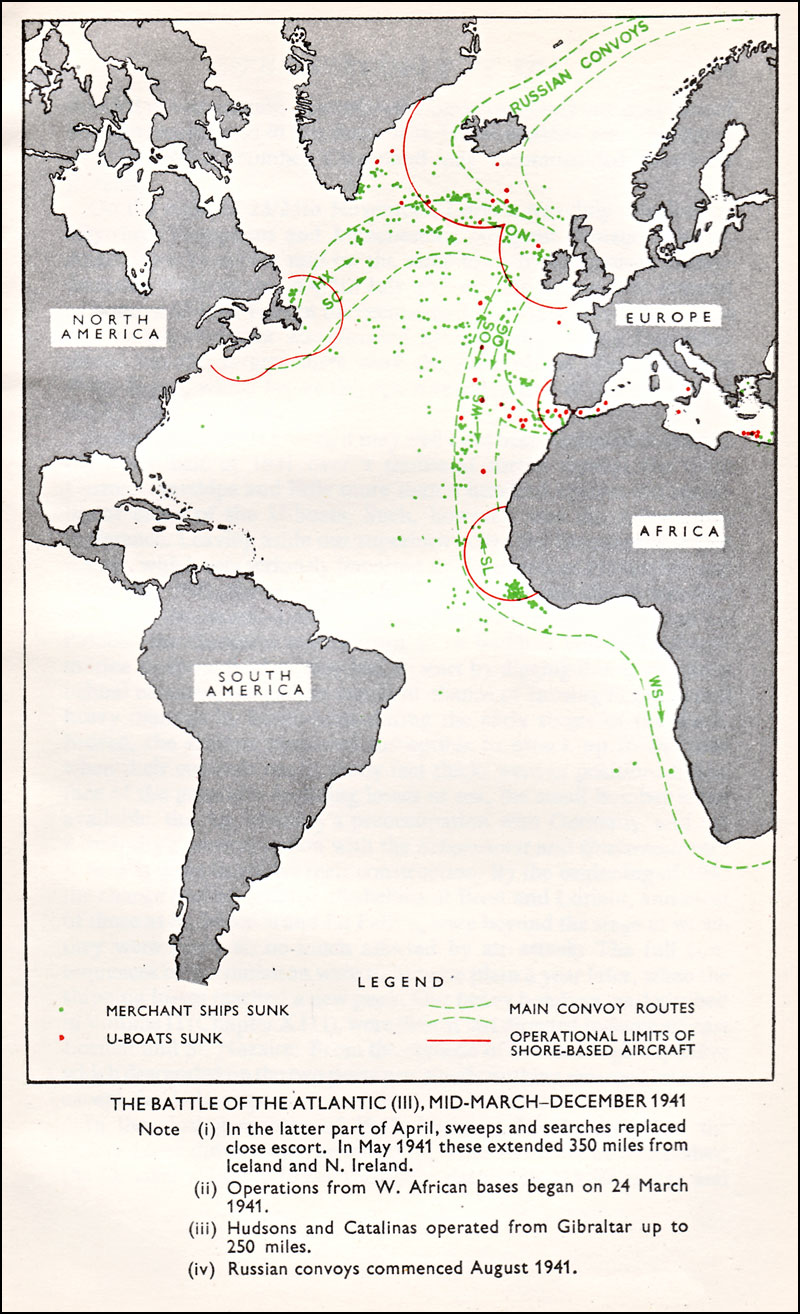
Convoy routes in the Atlantic Ocean during 1941

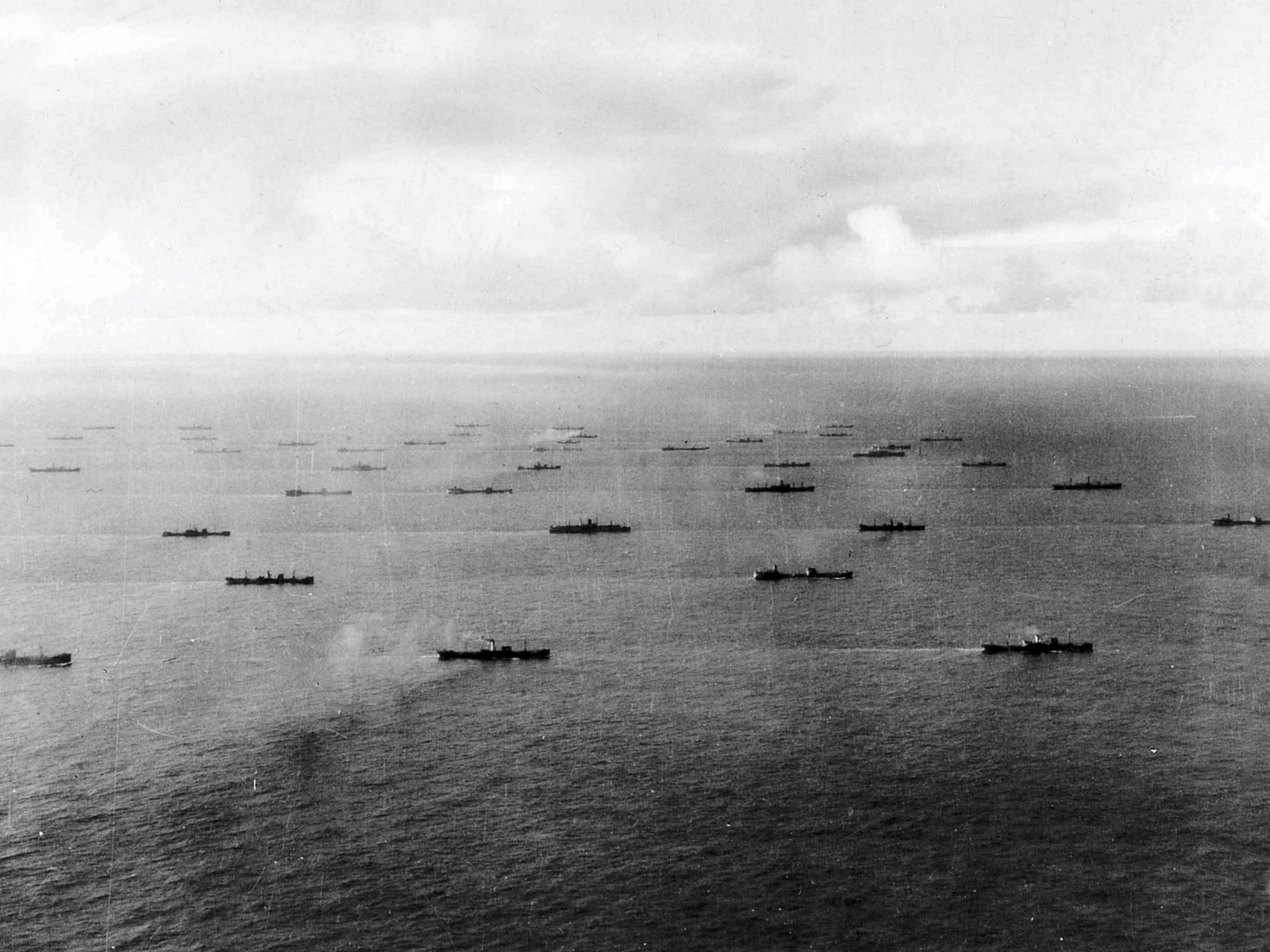
Allied convoy near Iceland, 1942

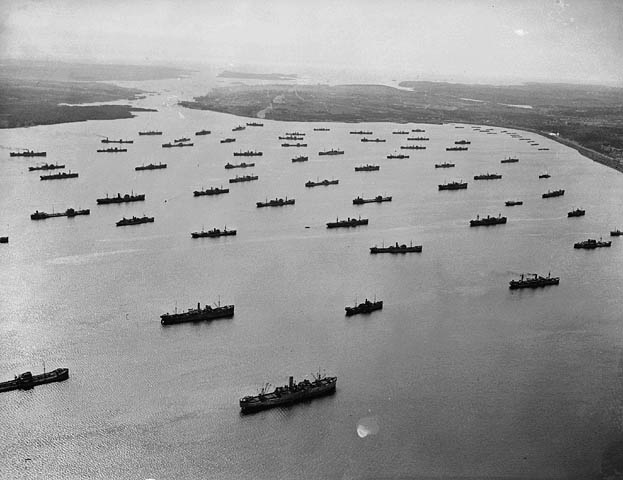
Allied convoy in Bedford Basin, Nova Scotia on 1 April 1943

The British adopted a convoy system, initially voluntary and later compulsory for almost all merchant ships, the moment that World War II was declared. Each convoy consisted of between 30 and 70 mostly unarmed merchant ships. Canadian, and later American, supplies were vital for Britain to continue its war effort. The course of the Battle of the Atlantic was a long struggle as the Germans developed anti-convoy tactics and the British developed counter-tactics to thwart the Germans.

The capability of a heavily armed warship against a convoy was dramatically illustrated by the fate of Convoy HX 84. On November 5, 1940, the German heavy cruiser Admiral Scheer encountered the convoy. Maiden, Trewellard, and Kenbame Head were quickly sunk, with Beaverford and Fresno City suffering the same fate later. Only the sacrifices of the armed merchant cruiser HMS Jervis Bay and the freighter Beaverford to stall the Scheer, in addition to failing light, allowed the rest of the convoy to escape.

The deterrence value of a battleship in protecting a convoy was also dramatically illustrated when the German light battleships (referred by some as battlecruisers) Scharnhorst and Gneisenau, mounting 11 in (28 cm) guns, came upon an eastbound British convoy (HX 106, with 41 ships) in the North Atlantic on February 8, 1941. When the Germans detected the slow but well-protected battleship HMS Ramillies escorting the convoy, they fled the scene rather than risk damage from her 15 in (38 cm) guns.

The enormous number of vessels involved and the frequency of engagements meant that statistical techniques could be applied to evaluate tactics: an early use of operational research in war.

Prior to overt participation in World War II, the US was actively engaged in convoys with the British in the North Atlantic Ocean, primarily supporting British activities in Iceland.

After Germany declared war on the US, the US Navy decided not to organize convoys on the American eastern seaboard. US Fleet Admiral Ernest King ignored advice on this subject from the British, as he had formed a poor opinion of the Royal Navy early in his career. The result was what the U-boat crews called their Second Happy Time, which did not end until convoys were introduced.

==== Pacific ====
In the Pacific Theater of World War II, Japanese merchant ships rarely traveled in convoys. Japanese destroyers were generally deficient in antisubmarine weaponry compared to their Allied counterparts, and the Japanese navy did not develop an inexpensive convoy escort like the Allies' destroyer escort/frigate until it was too late. In the early part of the conflict, American submarines in the Pacific were ineffective as they suffered from timid tactics, faulty torpedoes, and poor deployment, while there were only small numbers of British and Dutch boats. U.S. Admiral Charles A. Lockwood's efforts, coupled with strenuous complaints from his captains, rectified these problems and U.S. submarines became much more successful by war's end. As a result, the Japanese merchant fleet was largely destroyed by the end of the war. Japanese submarines, unlike their U.S. and German equivalents, focused on U.S. battle fleets rather than merchant convoys, and while they did manage some early successes, sinking two U.S. carriers, they failed to significantly inhibit the invasion convoys carrying troops and equipment in support of the U.S. island-hopping campaign.

Several notable battles in the South Pacific involved Allied bombers interdicting Japanese troopship convoys which were often defended by Japanese fighters, notable Guadalcanal (13 November 1942), Rabaul (5 January 1943), and the Battle of the Bismarck Sea (2–4 March 1943).

At the Battle off Samar, the effectiveness of the U.S. Navy's escorts was demonstrated when they managed to defend their troop convoy from a much larger and more powerful Japanese battle-fleet. The Japanese force comprised four battleships and numerous heavy cruisers, while the U.S. force consisted of escort carriers, destroyers, and destroyer escorts. Large numbers of American aircraft (albeit without much anti-ship ordnance other than torpedoes) and aggressive tactics of the destroyers (with their radar-directed gunfire) allowed the U.S. to sink three Japanese heavy cruisers at the cost of one escort carrier and three destroyers.

==== Tactics ====
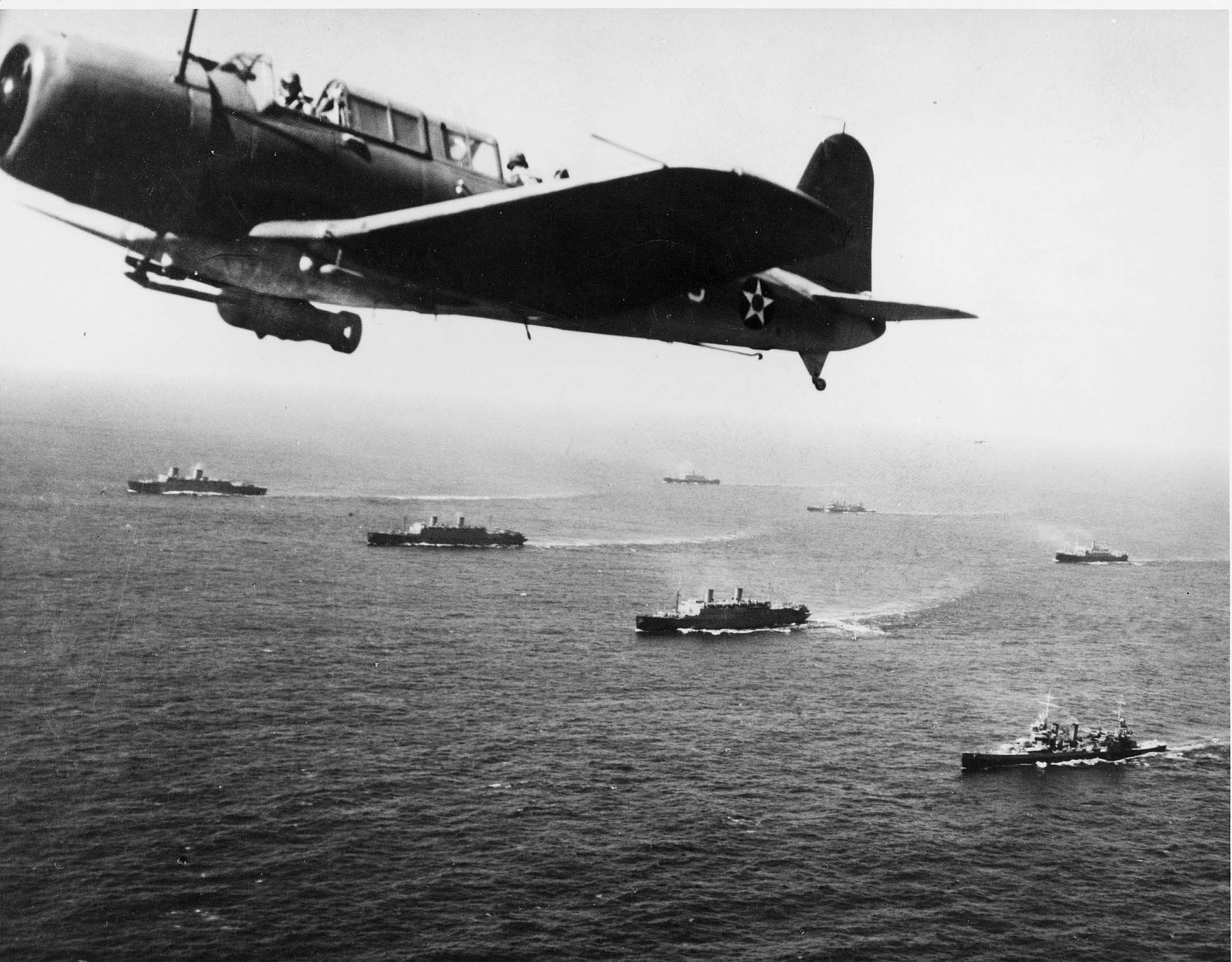
A convoy of merchant ships protected by airplanes en route to Cape Town during World War II

The German anti-convoy tactics included:

- long-range surveillance aircraft to find convoys;
- strings of U-boats (wolfpacks) that could be directed onto a convoy by radio;
- breaking the British naval codes;
- improved anti-ship weapons, including magnetic detonators and sonic homing torpedoes.

The Allied responses included:

- air raids on the U-boat bases at Brest and La Rochelle;
- converted merchant ships, e.g., Merchant aircraft carriers, Catapult Aircraft Merchantman and armed merchant cruisers
- Q-ships, submarine-hunters disguised as unarmed merchant ships to lure submarines into an attack
- more convoy escorts, including cheaply produced yet effective destroyer escorts/frigates (as corvettes were meant as a stopgap), and escort carriers;
- fighter aircraft (carried by escort carriers and merchant aircraft carriers) that would drive off German bombers and attack U-boats
- long-range aircraft patrols to find and attack U-boats;
- improved anti-submarine weapons such as the hedgehog;
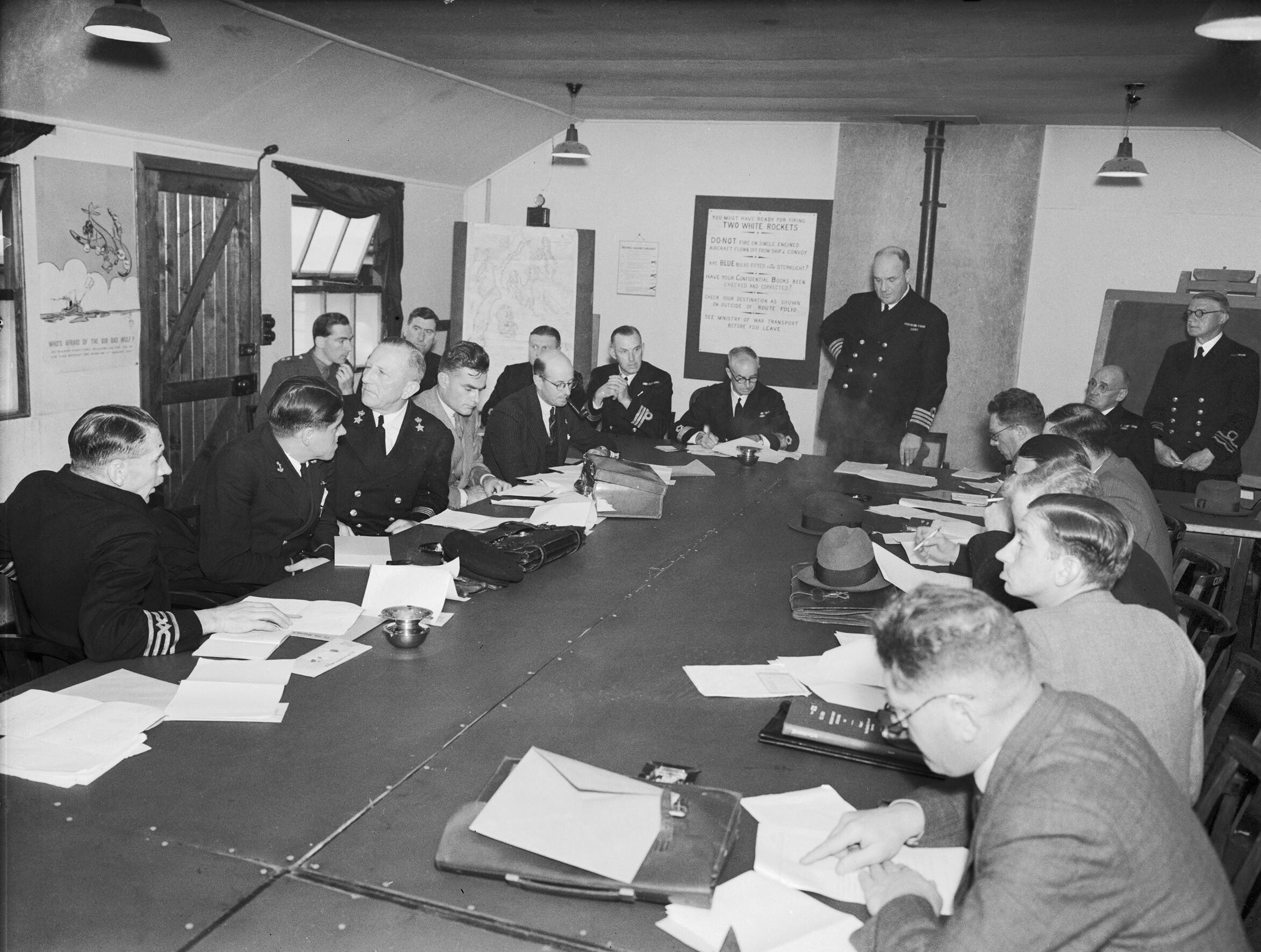
  A convoy conference in progress, August 1942
- larger convoys, allowing more escorts per convoy as well as the extraction of enough escorts to form hunter-killer support groups that were not attached to a particular convoy
- allocating vessels to convoys according to speed, so that faster ships were less exposed.

They were also aided by

- improved sonar (ASDIC) allowing escort vessels to better track U-boats;
- breaking the German naval cipher;
- improved radar and radio direction finding allowing planes to find and destroy U-boats;
- improved escort anti-submarine tactics developed by the Western Approaches Tactical Unit

==== Convoy battles ====
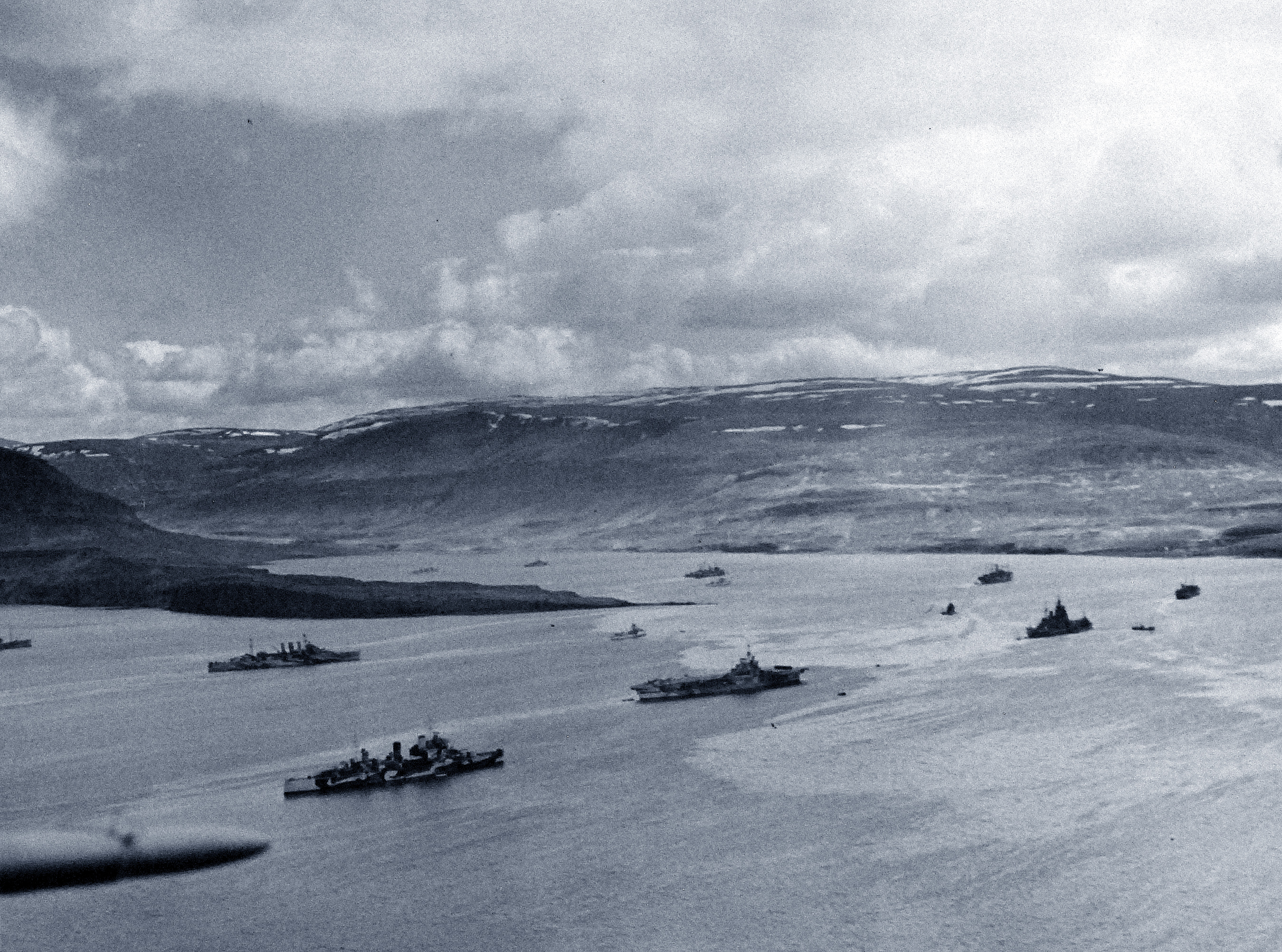
The covering forces of the Convoy PQ 17 at anchor in the harbor at Hvalfjord, Iceland, 1942

Many naval battles of World War II were fought around convoys, including:

- Convoy PQ 16, May 1942
- Convoy PQ 17, June–July 1942
- Convoy PQ 18, September 1942
- Operation Pedestal, August 1942
- The Naval Battle of Guadalcanal, November 1942
- The Battle of the Barents Sea, December 1942
- The Battle of the Bismarck Sea, March 1943

The convoy prefix indicates the route of the convoy. For example, 'PQ' would be Iceland to Northern Russia and 'QP' the return route.

=== Analysis ===
The success of convoys as an anti-submarine tactic during the world wars can be ascribed to several reasons related to U-boat capabilities, the size of the ocean and convoy escorts.

In practice, Type VII and Type IX U-boats were limited in their capabilities. Submerged speed and endurance was limited and not suited for overhauling many ships. Even a surfaced U-boat could take several hours to gain an attack position. Torpedo capacity was also restricted to around fourteen (Type VII) or 24 (Type IX), thus limiting the number of attacks that could be made, particularly when multiple firings were necessary for a single target. There was a real problem for the U-boats and their adversaries in finding each other; with a tiny proportion of the ocean in sight, without intelligence or radar, warships and even aircraft would be fortunate in coming across a submarine. The Royal Navy and later the United States Navy each took time to learn this lesson. Conversely, a U-boat's radius of vision was even smaller and had to be supplemented by regular long-range reconnaissance flights.

For both major allied navies, it had been difficult to grasp that, however large a convoy, its "footprint" (the area within which it could be spotted) was far smaller than if the individual ships had traveled independently. In other words, a submarine had less chance of finding a single convoy than if it were scattered as single ships. Moreover, once an attack had been made, the submarine would need to regain an attack position on the convoy. If, however, an attack were thwarted by escorts, even if the submarine had escaped damage, it would have to remain submerged for its own safety and might only recover its position after many hours' hard work. U-boats patrolling areas with constant and predictable flows of sea traffic, such as the United States Atlantic coast in early 1942, could dismiss a missed opportunity in the certain knowledge that another would soon present itself.

The destruction of submarines required their discovery, an improbable occurrence on aggressive patrols, by chance alone. Convoys, however, presented irresistible targets and could not be ignored. For this reason, the U-boats presented themselves as targets to the escorts with increasing possibility of destruction. In this way, the Ubootwaffe suffered severe losses, for little gain, when pressing pack attacks on well-defended convoys.

=== Post-World War II ===
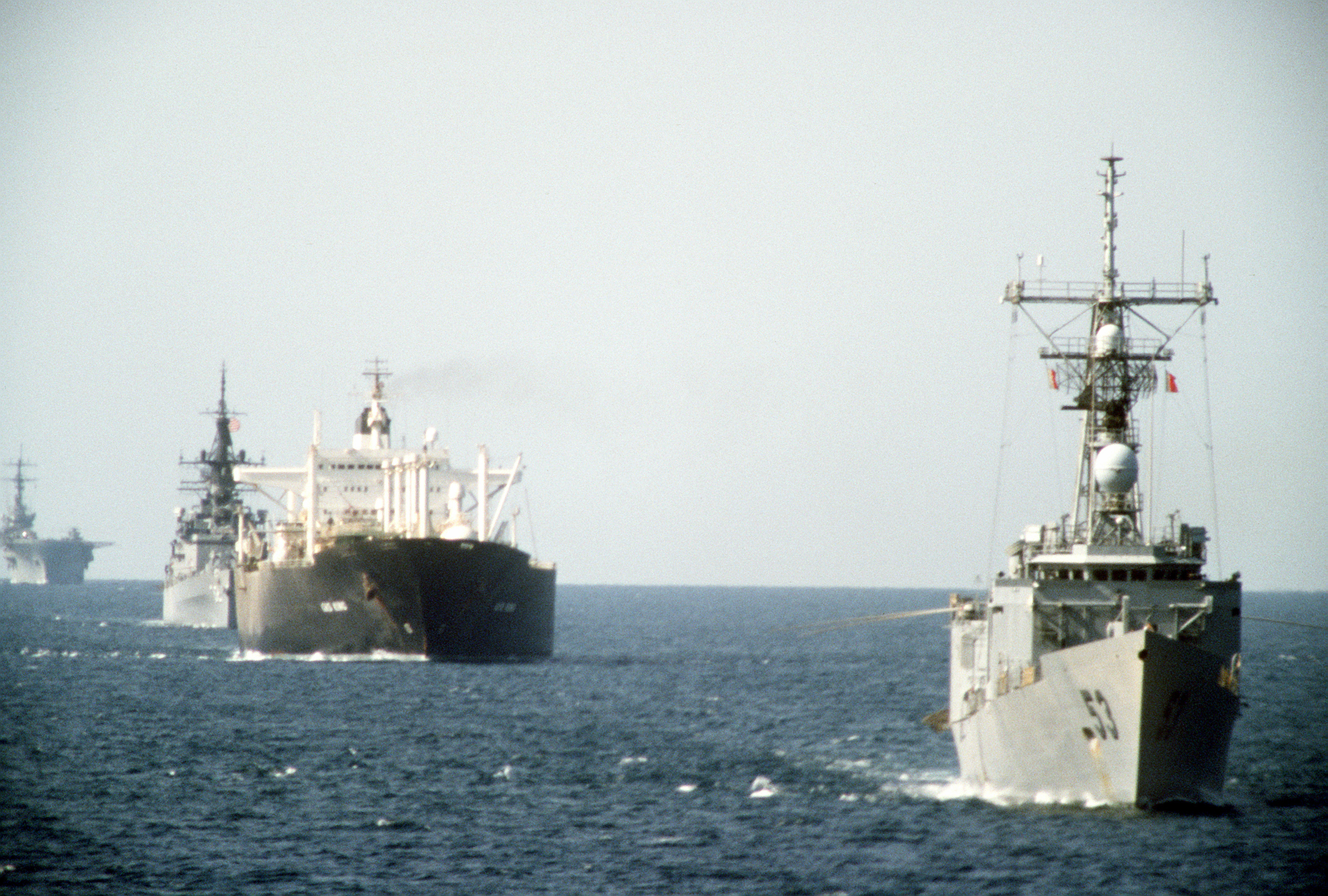
U.S. Navy vessels escorting the tanker Gas King in 1987

The largest convoy effort since World War II was Operation Earnest Will, the U.S. Navy's 1987–88 escort of reflagged Kuwaiti tankers in the Persian Gulf during the Iran–Iraq War.

In the present day, convoys are used as a tactic by navies to deter pirates off the coast of Somalia from capturing unarmed civilian freighters who would otherwise pose easy targets if they sailed alone.

== Road convoys ==
=== Military convoys ===
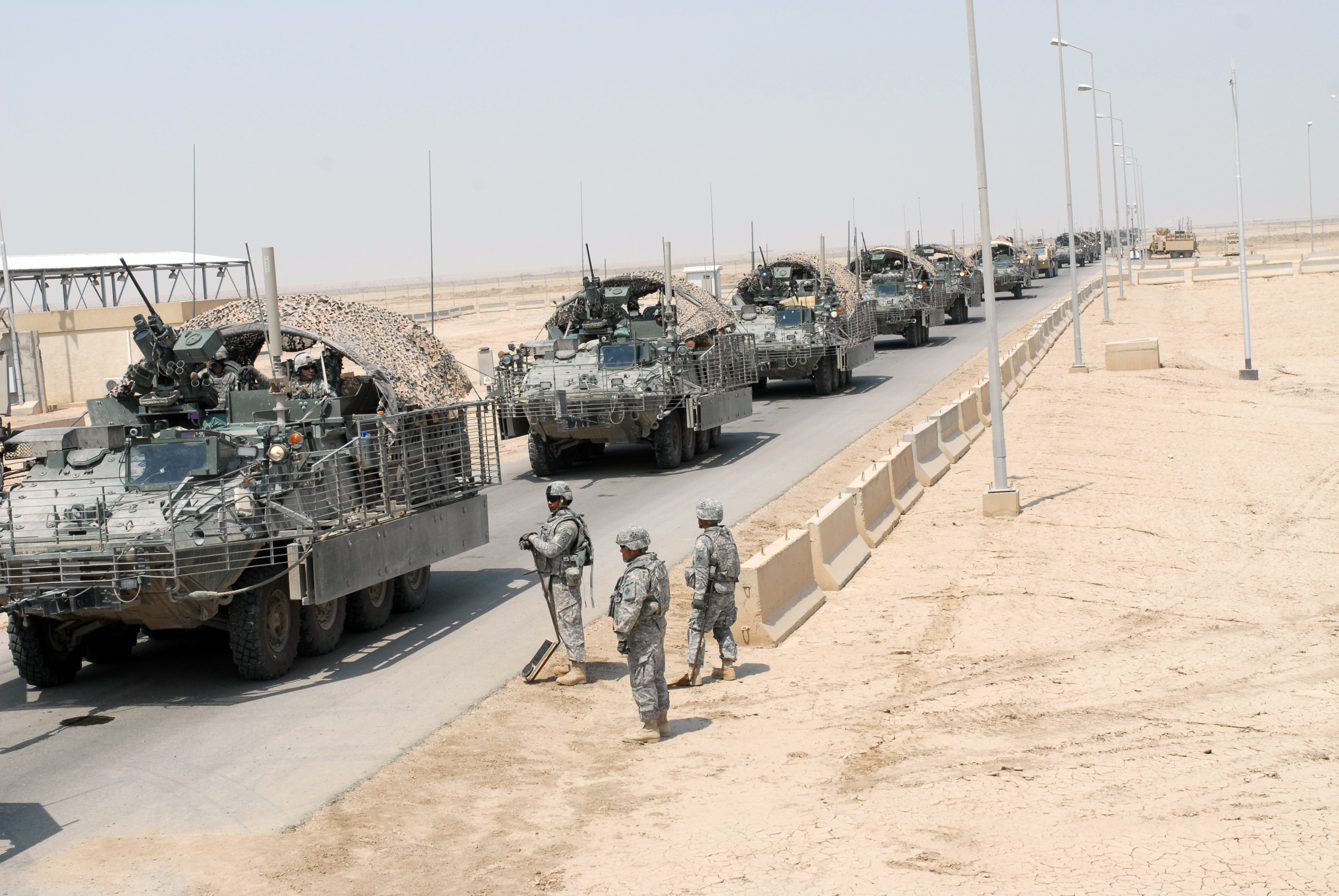
A convoy of Strykers traveling between Iraq and Kuwait during the Iraq War in 2010

=== Humanitarian aid convoys ===
The word "convoy" is also associated with groups of road vehicles being driven, mostly by volunteers, to deliver humanitarian aid, supplies, and—a stated objective in some cases—"solidarity".

In the 1990s these convoys became common traveling from Western Europe to countries of the former Yugoslavia, in particular Bosnia and Kosovo, to deal with the aftermath of the wars there. They also travel to countries where standards of care in institutions such as orphanages are considered low by Western European standards, such as Romania; and where other disasters have led to problems, such as around the Chernobyl disaster in Belarus and Ukraine.

The convoys are made possible partly by the relatively small geographic distances between the stable and affluent countries of Western Europe, and the areas of need in Eastern Europe and, in a few cases, North Africa and even Iraq. They are often justified because although less directly cost-effective than mass freight transport, they emphasise the support of large numbers of small groups, and are quite distinct from multinational organisations such as United Nations humanitarian efforts.

=== Truckers' convoys ===
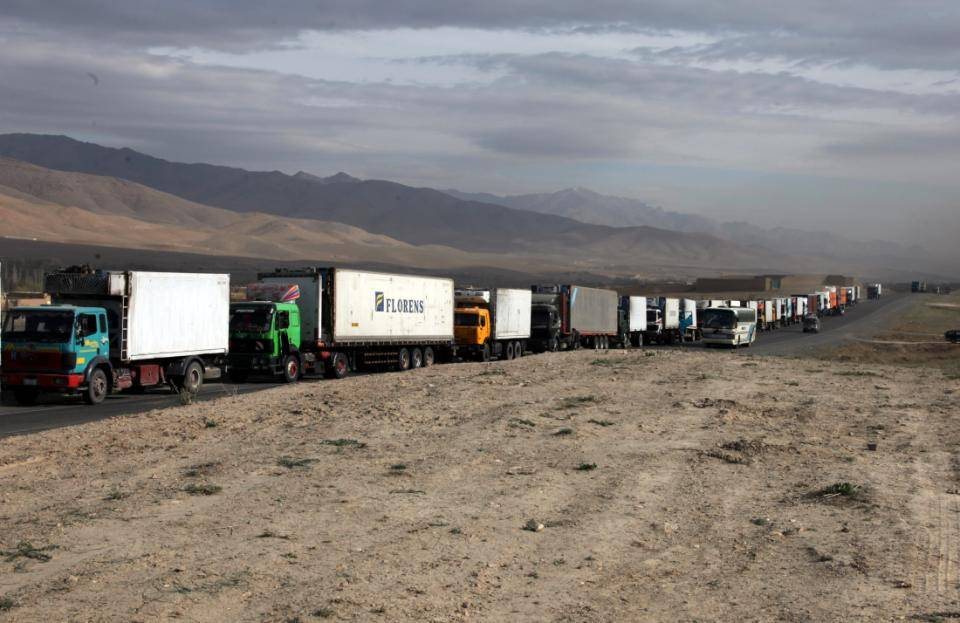
A convoy of civilian trucks waiting for security forces to secure a stretch of road in Afghanistan

Truckers' convoys consisting of semi-trailer trucks and/or petrol tankers are more similar to a caravan than a military convoy.

Truckers' convoys were created as a byproduct of the U.S.' national 55 mph speed limit and 18-wheelers becoming the prime targets of speed traps. Most truckers had difficult schedules to keep and as a result had to maintain a speed above the posted speed limit to reach their destinations on time. Convoys were started so that multiple trucks could run together at a high speed with the rationale being that if they passed a speed trap the police would only be able to pull over one of the trucks in the convoy. When driving on a highway, convoys are also useful to conserve fuel by drafting.

The film Convoy, inspired by a 1975 song of the same name, explores the camaraderie between truck drivers, where the culture of the CB radio encourages truck drivers to travel in convoys.

Truck convoys are sometimes organized for fundraising, charity, or promotional purposes. They can also be used as a form of protest, such as the Canada convoy protest in 2022.

=== Special convoy rights ===
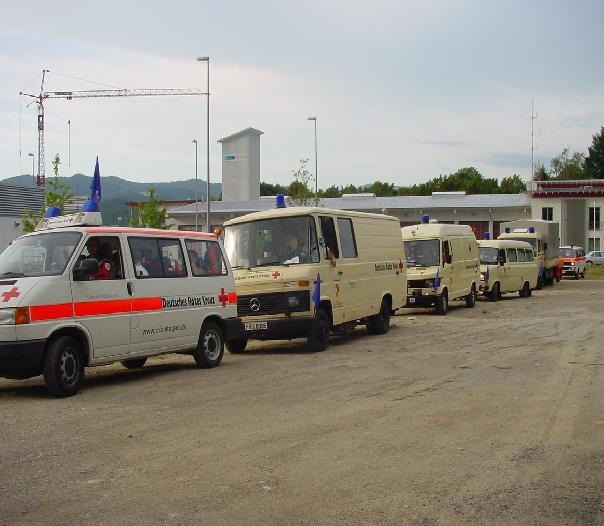
3. Einsatzeinheit of German Red Cross Freiburg Land preparing for a march under special convoy rights

The Highway Code of several European countries (Norway, Italy, Greece, Netherlands, Germany, Austria, Switzerland, possibly more) includes special rights for marked convoys. They have to be treated like a single vehicle. If the first vehicle has passed an intersection, all others may do so without interruption. If other road users overtake the convoy, they are not allowed to split into the queue. Clear and uniform marking has been required in court decisions for these rights to apply. Operating such convoy usually needs special permission, but there are exemptions for emergency and catastrophe intervention. Common practice is, to operate with the same style of marking as NATO convoys: STANAG 2154 marking plus country-specific augmentation listed in Annex B to the STANAG.

During the Cold War with its high number of military exercises, the military was the main user of convoy rights. Today, catastrophes like large-scale flooding might bring a high number of flagged convoys to the roads. Large-scale evacuations for the disarming of World War II bombs are another common reason for non-governmental organization (NGO) unit movements under convoy rights.

=== Storm convoys ===
In Norway, "convoy driving" (Norwegian: kolonnekjøring) is used during winter in case weather is too bad for vehicles to pass on their own. Convoy driving is initiated when the strong wind quickly fills the road with snow behind snowplows, particularly on mountain passes. Only a limited number of vehicles are allowed for each convoy and convoy leader is obliged to decline vehicles not fit for the drive. Storm convoys are prone to multiple-vehicle collision. Convoy driving is used through Hardangervidda pass on road 7 during blizzards. Convoy is sometimes used on road E134 at the highest and most exposed sections during bad weather. On European route E6 through Saltfjellet pass convoy driving is often used when wind speed is over 15–20 m/s (fresh or strong gale) in winter conditions. During the winter of 1990 there was convoy driving for almost 500 hours at Saltfjellet

== See also ==
- Camel train
- Motorcade
- Police escort
- Road train
- Shoaling and schooling
- Wagon train
