= 1910 in science =

The year 1910 in science and technology involved some significant events, listed below.

== Astronomy ==
- January 12 – Great January Comet of 1910 first observed (perihelion: January 17).
- January 22 – At 9:30 in the evening, the Vigarano Meteorite splits as it falls to Earth in Italy at the locality of the same name, near Emilia. Weighing 11.5 kg (or 25 lb.), the stone that is recovered is the first of the CV chondrites named for the location. CV chondrites are described as the oldest rocks in the Solar System. The other piece of the meteorite, weighing 4.5 kilograms (9.9 lb), is found a month later.
- April 10 – Halley's Comet becomes visible with the naked eye (perihelion: April 20); Earth passes through its tail about May 19 (its next visit will be in 1986).
- December 30 – A nova (later referred to as DI Lacertae), is spotted in the constellation Lacerta, by Anglican minister and astronomer T. H. E. C. Espin, making him the first human to see the birth of the new star.
- Approximate date – The Hertzsprung–Russell diagram is developed by Ejnar Hertzsprung and Henry Norris Russell.

== Cartography ==
- Behrmann projection introduced.

== Chemistry ==
- Albert Einstein and Marian Smoluchowski find the Einstein-Smoluchowski formula for the attenuation coefficient due to density fluctuations in a gas.
- Umetaro Suzuki isolates the first vitamin complex, aberic acid.
- Hoechst AG market Arsphenamine under the trade name Salvarsan, the first organic antisyphilitic, its properties having been discovered the previous fall by bacteriologist Sahachiro Hata during systematic testing in the laboratory of Paul Ehrlich; it rapidly becomes the world's most widely prescribed drug.
- George Barger and James Ewens of Wellcome Laboratories in London first synthesize dopamine.
- Frederick Soddy shows that the radioelements mesothorium (later shown to be ^{228}Ra), radium (^{226}Ra, the longest-lived isotope), and thorium X (^{224}Ra) are impossible to separate, leading to the identification of isotopes.

== Mathematics ==
- Publication of the 1st volume of Principia Mathematica by Alfred North Whitehead and Bertrand Russell, one of the most important and seminal works in mathematical logic and philosophy.
- First known use of the term "Econometrics" (in cognate form), by Paweł Ciompa.

== Physics ==
- German physicist Theodor Wulf climbs the Eiffel Tower with an electrometer and discovers the first evidence of cosmic rays.
- Hans Reissner and Gunnar Nordström define the Reissner–Nordström singularity; Hermann Weyl solves the special case for a point-body source.

== Physiology and medicine ==
- February 3 – The first pyloromyotomy, a surgery to correct the congenital narrowing (in infants) of the path between the stomach and the intestines (pyloric stenosis), is performed in Edinburgh by Sir Harold Stiles; however, the procedure is named for Dr. Wilhelm Ramstedt, who performs the surgery in 1911.
- March – International Psychoanalytical Association established.
- March 20 – The first clinic for treatment of occupational diseases is opened in Milan (Italy). (The first in the United States will be established in 1915.)
- May 18 – At the annual meeting of the American Association for the Study of the Feeble-Minded, Henry H. Goddard introduces a system for classifying individuals with intellectual disability based on intelligence quotient (IQ): moron for those with an IQ of 51–70, imbecile for those with an IQ of 26–50, and idiot for those with an IQ of 0-25.
- July 15 – Publication of the eighth edition of Emil Kraepelin's Psychiatrie: Ein Lehrbuch für Studierende und Arzte, naming Alzheimer's disease as a variety of dementia.
- October (approx.) – Approximate date of origin of Manchurian plague, a form of pneumonic plague which by December is spreading through northeastern China, killing more than 40,000.
- Thomas Hunt Morgan discovers that genes are located on chromosomes.
- Chicago cardiologist James B. Herrick makes the first published identification of sickle cells in the blood of a patient with anemia.
- Platelets are first named by James Homer Wright.
- Peyton Rous demonstrates that a malignant tumor can be transmitted by a virus (which becomes known as the Rous sarcoma virus, a retrovirus).
- Hans Christian Jacobaeus of Sweden performs the first thoracoscopic diagnosis with a cystoscope.

== Technology ==
- January 12–13 – Lee De Forest conducts an experimental broadcast of part of a live performance of Tosca and, the next day, a performance with the participation of the Italian tenor Enrico Caruso from the stage of Metropolitan Opera House in New York City.
- February 17 – A patent for the first safety catch (firearms) is filed by the Browning Arms Company in the United States.
- February 25 – Thomas Edison's "trolleyless street car", powered by storage batteries rather than by overhead electric wires, is publicly demonstrated on New York City's 29th Street horse car tracks.
- March 28 – Henri Fabre makes the first flights in a seaplane, at Martigues, France.
- June 7 – William G. Allen of the Allen Manufacturing Company is granted a United States patent for a hex key.
- October – First publication of infrared photographs, by American optical physicist Robert W. Wood in the Royal Photographic Society's Journal.
- December 3–18 – Georges Claude demonstrates the first modern neon light at the Paris Motor Show.
- Lieutenant-Colonel Dr. George Owen Squier of the United States Army invents telephone carrier multiplexing.
- Completion of Delaware, Lackawanna and Western Railroad's Paulinskill Viaduct on its Lackawanna Cut-Off, the world's largest reinforced concrete structure at this time, built under the supervision of Lincoln Bush, its chief engineer.

== Institutions ==
- March 17 – The Smithsonian Institution's Natural History Building, later the National Museum of Natural History, opens its doors to the public in Washington, D.C.

== Awards ==
- Nobel Prizes
  - Physics – Johannes Diderik van der Waals
  - Chemistry – Otto Wallach
  - Medicine – Albrecht Kossel

== Births ==
- January 20 – Friederike Victoria Gessner, later Joy Adamson (murdered 1980), Austrian-born wildlife conservationist.
- February 9 – Jacques Monod (died 1976), French biochemist, winner of Nobel Prize in Physiology or Medicine in 1965.
- February 13 – William Shockley (died 1989), American physicist.
- March 11 – Robert Havemann (died 1982), German chemist.
- April 6 – Barys Kit (died 2018), Russian-born American rocket scientist
- May 3 – Helen M. Duncan (died 1971), American geologist and paleontologist
- May 12 – Dorothy Hodgkin (died 1994), British chemist.
- June 11 – Jacques Cousteau (died 1997), French oceanographer.
- June 25 – Ian McTaggart-Cowan (died 2010), Scottish-born Canadian zoologist and ecologist.
- July 16 – David Lack (died 1973), English ornithologist.
- August 14 – Nüzhet Gökdoğan (died 2003), Turkish astronomer and mathematician
- August 18 – Pál Turán (died 1976), Hungarian mathematician.
- August 28 – C. Doris Hellman (died 1973), American historian of science.
- September 1 – Pierre Bézier (died 1999), French engineer.
- October 11 – Cahit Arf (died 1997), Turkish mathematician.
- October 27 – Margaret Hutchinson Rousseau (died 2000), American chemical engineer.
- October 31 – Victor Rothschild (died 1990), British polymath.
- December 24 – Bill Pickering (died 2004), New Zealand-born head of NASA's Jet Propulsion Laboratory.

== Deaths ==
- March 15 – Hans Heinrich Landolt (born 1831), Swiss-born chemist.
- May 10 – Stanislao Cannizzaro (born 1826), Italian chemist.
- May 12 – William Huggins (born 1824), English astronomer.
- May 27 – Robert Koch (born 1843), German bacteriologist.
- July 4 – Giovanni Schiaparelli (born 1835), Italian astronomer.
- July 14 – Mihran Kassabian (born 1870), American radiologist.
- August 12 – Florence Nightingale (born 1820), English nurse.
