= 1772 in science =

The year 1772 in science and technology involved some significant events.

== Astronomy ==
- Lagrange finds the special-case solution to the three-body problem that becomes known as the Lagrangian points.

== Cartography ==
- Johann Heinrich Lambert publishes seven new map projections, including the Lambert conformal conic, transverse Mercator and Lambert azimuthal equal area.

== Chemistry ==
- Daniel Rutherford isolates nitrogen.
- Joseph Priestley synthesizes nitrous oxide as phlogisticated nitrous air. Antoine Lavoisier privately presents his own views on phlogiston theory to the French Academy of Sciences.
- Louis-Bernard Guyton de Morveau demonstrates that metals gain weight on calcination.

== Earth sciences ==
- The Central England temperature (CET) record begins daily measurements of mean surface air temperatures in the Midlands region of England.
- William Hamilton publishes Observations on Mount Vesuvius, Mount Etna, and Other Volcano's: in a series of letters addressed to the Royal Society from the Honorable Sir William Hamilton (London).

== Mathematics ==
- Euler confirms that $2^{31}-1$ is a Mersenne prime.
- The Marquis de Condorcet publishes his second significant paper on integral calculus.

== Technology ==
- May 28 – The Staffordshire and Worcestershire Canal opens for traffic throughout in England from a junction with the Trent and Mersey Canal to the River Severn at Stourport. Engineered by James Brindley, this is the first British trunk canal completed and its dimensions determine the size of boat used throughout the narrow canal network (72 feet (22 m) by 7 feet (2.1 m)).
- Andrew Meikle invents spring sails for windmills.

== Publications ==
- Joseph Priestley – The History and Present State of Discoveries Relating to Vision, Light and Colours ("Optics")

== Awards ==
- Copley Medal: Joseph Priestley

== Births ==
- February 11 – Thomas Webster, Scottish geologist (died 1844)
- June 8 – Robert Stevenson, Scottish lighthouse engineer (died 1850)
- April 15 – Étienne Geoffroy Saint-Hilaire, French naturalist (died 1844)
- October 29 – Jean Henri Jaume Saint-Hilaire, French botanist (died 1845)
- November 22 - Pierre Amable Jean-Baptiste Trannoy, French physician, hygienist and botanist (died 1831)
- November 28 – Luke Howard, English meteorologist and manufacturing chemist (died 1864)
- December 25 – John Mackay, Scottish botanist (died 1802)

== Deaths ==
- March 22 – John Canton, English physicist (born 1718)
- March 29 – Emanuel Swedenborg, Swedish scientist and theologian (born 1688)
- September 30 – James Brindley, English canal builder (born 1716)
