= Military incompetence =

Failures of military organizations

Military incompetence is the failure of military organizations to perform effectively, a phenomenon that analysts have attributed both to the shortcomings of individual commanders and to deficiencies in institutional culture. Scholarship on the subject has moved away from explaining failure through individual stupidity and toward analyzing the psychological and organizational conditions that produce it.

== Causes ==
In On the Psychology of Military Incompetence (1976), the psychologist Norman F. Dixon argued that serious military failures frequently arise not from a commander's lack of intelligence but from personality traits associated with authoritarianism, including an absence of intellectual curiosity, a dislike of new ideas, and a self-assurance that hampers foresight.

In Military Misfortunes (1990), Eliot Cohen and John Gooch located the roots of defeat in military organizations and their cultures rather than in single individuals, observing that the same army may win in one situation and fail badly in the next. They set out a taxonomy of three basic failures (a failure to learn from past experience, a failure to anticipate future conditions, and a failure to adapt to unfolding events), and argued that two occurring together produce an aggregate failure and all three together a catastrophic one.

In Overconfidence and War: The Havoc and Glory of Positive Illusions (2004), Dominic D. P. Johnson focusses on the tendency of political leaders and military commanders to overestimate their own capabilities and correspondingly, to underestimate the capabilties of their opponents.

== Selected historical examples ==
=== Karl Mack at Ulm (1805) ===
During the War of the Third Coalition, the Austrian general Karl Mack von Leiberich advanced into Bavaria and was encircled at Ulm by Napoleon's rapid maneuvering before his expected Russian support could arrive. About 25,000 troops surrendered at Ulm on 20 October 1805, part of a campaign in which more than 60,000 Austrians were captured for fewer than 2,000 French casualties; Mack was afterward court-martialed, convicted, stripped of his rank, and imprisoned. The historian David G. Chandler describes Ulm as among the most complete of Napoleon's victories, won principally through maneuver rather than battle.

=== Braxton Bragg ===
The Confederate general Braxton Bragg became, in the words of his biographer Earl J. Hess, the "chief whipping boy of the Confederacy", acquiring a durable reputation for incompetence and serving as a scapegoat for Southern defeats. James M. McPherson's reference to "the bumblers like Bragg and Pemberton and Hood who lost the West" sums up the judgment of many modern historians. Bragg's shortcomings as an army commander included his unimaginative tactics, mostly his reliance on frontal assault (such as the Hornet's Nest at Shiloh, Breckinridge's assault at Stones River, and numerous instances at Chickamauga), and his lack of post-battle follow-up that turned tactical victories or draws into strategic disappointments (Perryville and Chickamauga). His sour disposition, a penchant for blaming others for defeat, and poor interpersonal skills undoubtedly caused him to be criticized more directly than many of his unsuccessful contemporaries. Peter Cozzens wrote about his relationship with subordinates:

Even Bragg's staunchest supporters admonished him for his quick temper, general irritability, and tendency to wound innocent men with barbs thrown during his frequent fits of anger. His reluctance to praise or flatter was exceeded, we are told, only by the tenacity with which, once formed, he clung to an adverse impression of a subordinate. For such officers—and they were many in the Army of Mississippi—Bragg's removal or their transfer were the only alternatives to an unbearable existence.

— Peter Cozzens, No Better Place to Die: The Battle of Stones River

One private, Sam Watkins, who later became a professional writer, said in his memoirs that "None of Bragg's men soldiers ever loved him. They had no faith in his ability as a general. He was looked upon as a merciless tyrant ... He loved to crush the spirit of the men." Historian Ty Seidule says that Bragg's battles often ended in defeat because of his insistence on direct frontal assaults and his "uncanny ability to turn minor wins and losses into strategic defeats."

== Effects on military forces ==
Modern research has examined how poor or abusive command affects military organizations. After the Secretary of the Army asked in 2003 how the service identified destructive leaders, a study at the United States Army War College led by George E. Reed and R. Craig Bullis found that the behavior the Army labels toxic leadership was both present and damaging. Reported effects include lower individual and unit morale, degraded communication, heightened stress, organizational cynicism, and a reduced willingness among subordinates to exert discretionary effort. British Army leadership doctrine similarly frames toxic leadership as the product of a "toxic triangle" of destructive leaders, susceptible followers, and a conducive environment, and warns that, if left unchallenged, it can undermine an organization's cohesion and operational capability.

== See also ==
- List of military disasters
