= Norman F. Dixon =

British psychologist

Norman Frank Dixon MBE, Fellow of the British Psychological Society (1922–2013) was a British psychologist most noted for his 1976 book On the Psychology of Military Incompetence.

== Career ==
During World War II, Dixon served as a lieutenant in the Corps of Royal Engineers in North West Europe and received the MBE.

After ten years' service, he began university studies in 1950 and earned a first-class degree in psychology, followed by Doctor of Philosophy and Doctor of Science degrees. His research into subliminal perception and preconscious processing was influential. He taught psychology at University College London, where he became professor emeritus on his retirement.

== Honours ==
In 1974, Dixon was awarded the Carpenter Medal by the University of London for his doctoral thesis. The University of Lund awarded him an honorary doctorate.

== Selected publications ==
- Dixon, Norman F. (1971). Subliminal perception; the nature of a controversy. London: McGraw-Hill.
- Dixon, Norman F. (1976). On the psychology of military incompetence. New York: Basic Books.
- Dixon, Norman F. (1981). Preconscious processing. Chichester: Wiley
- Dixon, Norman F. (1987). Our Own Worst Enemy. Jonathan Cape.

== See also ==
- Military incompetence
