= Patrick Callaerts =

Belgian molecular biologist

Patrick Callaerts is a Belgian molecular biologist and full professor at the KU Leuven (Leuven, Belgium). He is head of the Laboratory of Behavioral and Developmental Genetics.

Patrick Callaerts obtained a PhD from the KU Leuven in 1992. He did a Postdoc at the Biozentrum of University of Basel in Switzerland from 1992 until 1997. He was assistant professor at the University of Houston in Houston, Texas United States from 1997 until 2003 and 2004 until 2004.

His research interest is on gene circuits in Drosophila melanogaster involved in brain development as models for human neurodevelopmental disorders, ranging from transcription factors to effector genes and signaling pathways.

As of August 1st 2025, he will be the vice-rector of the Group of Biomedical Sciences.
