= SampTA =

Biennial conference on sampling theory

SampTA (Sampling Theory and Applications) is a biennial interdisciplinary conference for mathematicians, engineers, and applied scientists. The main purpose of SampTA is to exchange recent advances in sampling theory and to explore new trends and directions in the related areas of application. The conference focuses on such fields as signal processing and image processing, coding theory, control theory, real analysis and complex analysis, harmonic analysis, and the theory of differential equations. All of these topics have received a large degree of attention from machine learning researchers, with SampTA serving as bridge between these two communities.

SampTA features plenary talks by prominent speakers, special sessions on selected topics reflecting the current trends in sampling theory and its applications to the engineering sciences, as well as regular sessions about traditional topics in sampling theory. Contributions from authors attending the SampTA conferences are usually published in special issues of Sampling Theory in Signal and Image Processing, an international journal dedicated to sampling theory and its applications. The proceedings of SampTA 2015 were indexed in IEEE Xplore.

The SampTA conference series began as a small workshop in 1995 in Riga, Latvia, but the meetings grew into full-fledged conferences attracting an even mix of mathematicians and engineers as the interest in sampling theory and its many applications blossomed. This even mix makes the SampTA meetings unique in the scientific community. The conference organization is headed by an international steering committee consisting of prominent mathematicians and engineers, and a technical committee responsible for the conference program. Due to the COVID-19 pandemic, SampTA paused from 2020–2022, but resumed in Summer 2023.

The biennial meetings are announced in various Mathematics and Engineering Calendars, including the Mathematics Calendar of the American Mathematical Society, the Wavelet Digest., the Numerical Harmonic Analysis Group (NuHAG) at the University of Vienna, the Norbert Wiener Center at the University of Maryland, and the IEEE Signal Processing Society.

== List of meetings ==
- Vienna, Austria, July 28 - August 01, 2025
- New Haven, U.S.A., July 10–14, 2023 link
- Bordeaux, France, July 8–12, 2019 link
- Tallinn, Estonia, July 3–7, 2017 link
- Washington, D.C., U.S., May 25–29, 2015 link
- Bremen, Germany, July 1–5, 2013 link
- Singapore, May 2–6, 2011 link
- Marseille, France, May 18–22, 2009 link
- Thessaloniki, Greece, June 1–5, 2007 link
- Samsun, Turkey, July 10–15, 2005 link
- Strobl, Austria, May 26– 30, 2003 link
- Orlando, U.S., May 13– 17, 2001 link
- Loen, Norway, August 11– 14, 1999 link
- Aveiro, Portugal, July 16– 19, 1997 link
- Riga, Latvia, September 20– 22, 1995 link
