= Jerrold Schwaber =

American biologist and geneticist

Jerrold Schwaber (May 24, 1947 – June 6, 2014) was an American biologist and geneticist. In 1973 he described, with Edward Cohen, a method of producing antibodies involving human–mouse hybrid cells, or hybridomas. They fused "mouse myeloma cells secreting immunoglobulin of known specificity and human peripheral blood lymphocytes not secreting detectable immunoglobulin. The hybrid cells continued secretion of mouse immunoglobulin and initiate synthesis and secretion of human immunoglobulin." The antibody producing cells did not survive long and the antigens that the antibodies targeted remained unknown. In 1975, Georges Köhler, César Milstein, and Niels Kaj Jerne, succeeded in making hybridomas that made antibodies to known antigens and that were immortalized. They shared the Nobel Prize in Physiology or Medicine in 1984 for the discovery. His work in laying the foundation for modern monoclonal antibody technology is recognized.

== Personal life ==
Jerrold Schwaber was born in Evanston, Illinois in 1947, the 3rd of 4 brothers. He received a Ph.D. from the University of Chicago in 1974. He died at his home in Haddonfield, NJ on June 6, 2014. He is survived by his wife, Susan Hoch MD, and his sons Jason and Jeff Schwaber.

His brother, Ken Schwaber, is a software developer known for the invention of Scrum development process.
