= Margaret Altmann =

German-American biologist (1900–1984)

- Born: 1900; Berlin, Germany
- Died: 1984 (aged 83–84)
- Occupation: Biologist
- Years active: 1970–1984

Margaret Altmann (1900–1984) was a German-American biologist focusing on animal husbandry and psychobiology. She was one of the first women to work in the psychobiology, ethology and animal husbandry fields, with a focus on livestock.

== Early life and education ==
Margaret Altmann was born in Berlin, German Empire. She worked in farm management. She attended the University of Bonn for rural economics. She received her PhD from Bonn in 1928. After graduation, she stayed in Germany and worked in the government farm industry, focusing on the breeding of dairy animals. In 1933, she relocated to the United States. She attended Cornell University. In 1938, Altmann received her second PhD from Cornell, with a degree in animal breeding from the psychobiology department. In the same year she became a citizen of the United States.

== Career ==
Altmann started working at the Hampton Institute, where she was associate professor, and then professor. She taught animal genetics and animal husbandry. Eventually, she started working on large wild mammals and relocated to Colorado. From 1948 until 1956 she lived in Colorado, working at a biological research center. During this time, she started studying psychobiology. She taught at Kenyon College. From 1959 until 1969 she taught at the University of Colorado. In 1969, she retired, and became professor emerita. She wrote papers about moose, elk and packs. Larry Squire worked under her while doing bison research in Jackson Hole, Wyoming. Squire described Altmann as an "interesting character". While in Wyoming, she researched elk, riding horseback, and teaching others to ride, to follow packs.

She was a twenty-year member of the American Society of Mammalogists and published work in the Journal of Mammalogy. She was also a member of the Genetics Society of America and the American Association for the Advancement of Science.

== Later life and legacy ==
In 1986, the University of Arizona held a symposium about ungulates in honor of Altmann.

== Published works ==
- Altmann, Margaret. "A study of behavior in a horse-mule group." Sociometry. 14.4 (1951), pp. 351–354.
- Chiszar, D. and Wertheimer, M. (1988), Margaret Altmann: A rugged pioneer in rugged fields. Journal of the History of the Behavioral Sciences, 24: 102–106. doi: 10.1002/1520-6696(198801)24:1<102::AID-JHBS2300240121>3.0.CO;2-O
