= Charles Thackrah =

English surgeon

Charles Turner Thackrah, MRCS Eng; (1795, in Leeds – 1833) was an English surgeon. He was a pioneer in the field of occupational medicine and is known for his work The Effects of the Principal Arts, Trades, and Professions, and of Civic States and Habits of Living, on Health and Longevity. He was a founder member of the Leeds School of Medicine. He died of tuberculosis in 1833, at the age of 38.

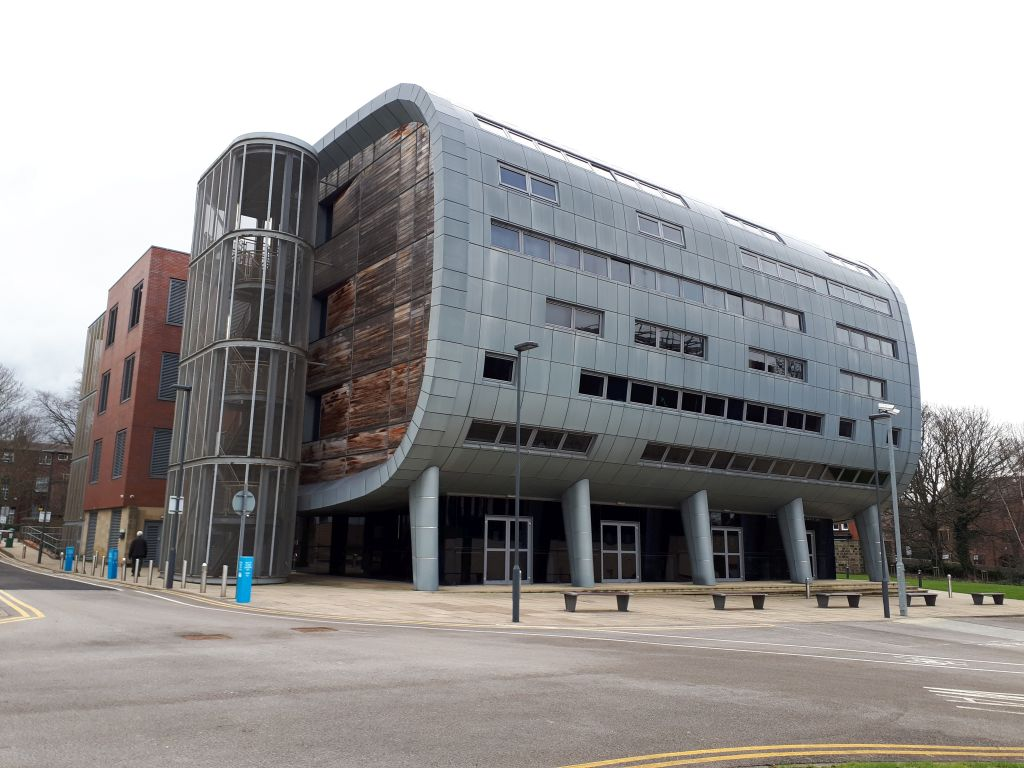
The Charles Thackrah building at the University of Leeds

A building was opened in his honour and given his name at the University of Leeds in around 2007.
