= Helen Redfield =

American geneticist

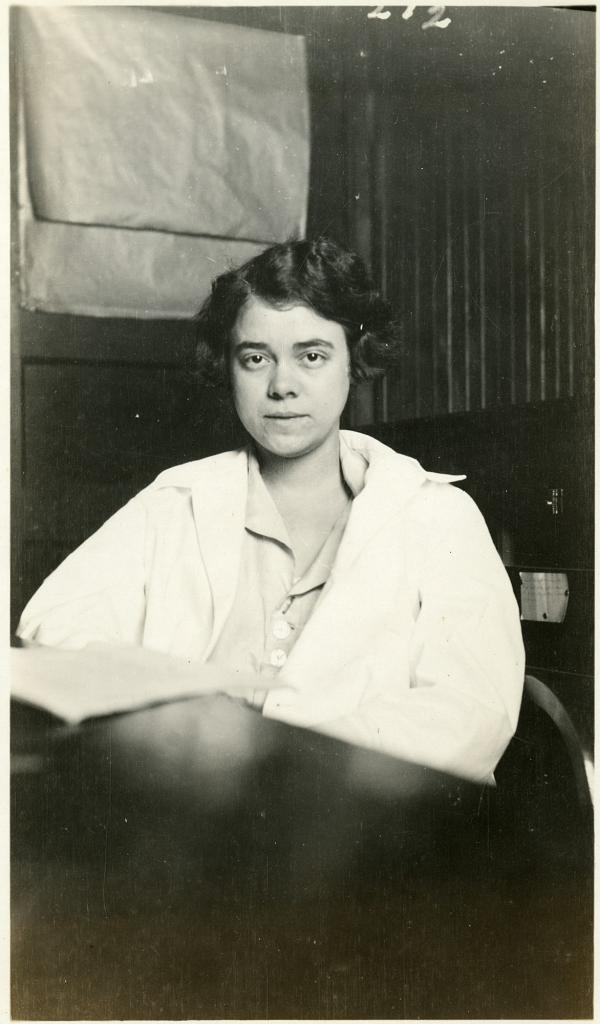
- Born: May 5, 1900; Archbold, Ohio
- Died: 1988 (aged 87–88)
- Known for: Genetics of drosophila

Helen Redfield (born May 5, 1900 in Archbold, Ohio, died 1988), was an American geneticist. Redfield graduated from Rice University in 1920, followed by earning her Ph.D. in zoology from the University of California, Berkeley in 1921. While at Rice, she worked in the mathematics department. She joined the faculty of Stanford University in 1925 and that same year she became a National Research Fellow at Columbia University. In 1926 she married Jack Schultz, the couple had two children. Redfield retained her maiden name upon her marriage. In 1929 she worked as a teaching fellow at New York University. Ten years later she worked as a geneticist in the Kerckhoff Laboratory at the California Institute of Technology. Starting in 1942, during World War II, she worked as a lab scientist at Cold Spring Harbor Laboratory during the summer. From 1951 until 1961 she served as a research associate at the Institute for Cancer Research.

== Publications ==
- "A Comparison of Triploid and Diploid Crossing over for Chromosome II of Drosophila Melanogaster." Genetics. 17.2 (1932): 137-152.
- "Crossing over in the third chromosomes of triploids of Drosophila melano gaster." Genetics. 15.3 (1930): 205-252.
- "Delayed Mating and the Relationship of Recombination to Maternal Age in Drosophila Melanogaster." Genetics. 53.3 (1966): 593-607.
- "Egg Mortality and Interchromosomal Effects on Recombination." Genetics. 42.6 (1957): 712-728.
- with Jack Schultz. "Interchromosomal effects on crossing over in drosophila." Cold Spring Harb Symp Quant Biology. 16 (1951): 175-197.
- "The maternal inheritance of a sex-limited lethal effect in Drosophila melanogaster." Genetics. 11.5 (1926): 482-502.
- "Recombination Increase due to Heterologous Inversions and the Relation to Cytological Length." Proceedings of the National Academy of Sciences of the United States of America. 41.12 (1955): 1084-1091.
