= C. Doris Hellman =

American historian of science (1910–1973)

- Hellman in Rosen (1975)
- Born: Clarisse Doris Hellman; August 28, 1910; New York City, U.S.
- Died: March 28, 1973 (aged 62); New York City, U.S.
- Education: Horace Mann School; Vassar College; Radcliffe College; Columbia University
- Known for: Great Comet of 1577; Johannes Kepler
- Spouse: Morton Pepper
- Children: 2
- Awards: Fellow of Royal Astronomical Society; Member of International Academy of the History of Science; Fellow of American Association for the Advancement of Science
- Scientific career
- Fields: History of science
- Workplaces: Pratt Institute; New York University; Queens College, CUNY
- Thesis: The Comet of 1577: Its Place in the History of Astronomy (1943)
- Doctoral advisor: Frederick Barry
- Other academic advisors: George Sarton

Clarisse Doris Hellman Pepper (August 28, 1910 – March 28, 1973) was an American historian of science, "one of the first professional historians of science in the United States". She specialized in 16th- and 17th-century astronomy, wrote a book on the Great Comet of 1577, and was the translator of another book, a biography of Johannes Kepler. She became a professor at the Pratt Institute and later at the Queens College, City University of New York, and was recognized by membership in several selective academic societies.

== Early life and education ==
Hellman was born on August 28, 1910, in New York City. Her father, Alfred Myer Hellman, was an obstetrician and a collector of rare books; her mother Clarisse (née Bloom) later served as the only female member of the board of directors of Sydenham Hospital. She graduated from the Horace Mann School in 1926, and earned a bachelor's degree in mathematics and astronomy (with election to Phi Beta Kappa) from Vassar College in 1930. She then became a Vassar College Fellow at Radcliffe College and completed a master's degree in the history of science at Radcliffe in 1931. According to biographer Joseph Dauben, this was "one of the country's earliest advanced degrees in history of science". At Radcliffe, Harvard historian of science George Sarton became one of her mentors.

She became a doctoral student at Columbia University and, interrupting her studies to marry and raise two daughters, completed her Ph.D. in 1943. Her dissertation concerned the Great Comet of 1577, and was titled The Comet of 1577: Its Place in the History of Astronomy. In it, she credits Columbia professor Frederick Barry for supervising her doctoral research, and thanks Sarton and Lynn Thorndike for their encouragement, suggestions, and criticism. The dissertation was also published as a book in 1944 by the Columbia University Press, and reprinted in 1971 by the AMS Press of New York.

== Later life and career ==
In 1949, Hellman began a ten-year term on the council of the History of Science Society. In 1951, she was appointed to the faculty of the Pratt Institute, in the Department of Social Studies, and in the early 1950s she led the effort to found The New York Section of the History of Science Society.

In 1959 she published her second book, a translation of a biography of Johannes Kepler originally written in German by Max Caspar. It was reprinted by Dover Publications in 1993. She also represented the United States at the International Union of the History and Philosophy of Science Congress on the History of Science in Spain in 1959, and was secretary of the following congress, in 1962 at Cornell University. Her research in 1959–1960 was supported by a National Science Foundation senior postdoctoral fellowship. Continuing to work at the Pratt Institute, she also began working as an adjunct professor at New York University in 1964. In 1966, she moved to Queens College, City University of New York, also teaching at the CUNY Graduate Center.

She died in New York on March 28, 1973, after a long illness. Her husband, Morton Pepper (a lawyer and president of the Jewish Guild for the Blind) remarried and lived until 1988. Her daughters, Alice and Carol Pepper, married two brothers who both became academics, Robert L. and Paul R. Cooper.

== Books ==
=== The Comet of 1577 ===
Hellman's book The Comet of 1577: Its Place in the History of Astronomy collected and catalogued accounts of the Great Comet of 1577 by writers of the time. It also includes two introductory chapters based on the work of Lynn Thorndike and George Sarton summarizing what was known about comets prior to 1577. Prior works in the history of astronomy largely told the tale only of astronomical observations, and Hellman broke from this tradition by including the writings of many others, including "preachers, poets, persons of general culture, and astrologers". The book's material on astronomical observations of the comet is divided, broadly, according to the measurement of parallax and its use in determining the position of the comet with respect to the Moon, with one chapter on astronomers who believed it to be closer than the Moon, another chapter on those who, finding no observable parallax, determined that it was farther away (chief among them Tycho Brahe), and a third on those who did not consider the question.

Although Brahe himself rejected the Sun-centered model of the Solar System put forward by Nicolaus Copernicus, in favor of his own version of the more orthodox earth-centered model of the time, the observations of Brahe cast serious doubt on the Earth-centered model and on its reliance on solid but transparent spheres supporting the planets, because they showed the comet passing through that space without obstruction. As the book briefly outlines in its conclusion, and as historians of science came to realize, in large part based on Hellman's work, these observations of the comet played a key role in the success of the Copernican Revolution of the early 17th century, in which the Earth-centered model was supplanted by the Sun-centered one.

This changing view of Brahe's and the comet's place in the history of science is reflected in the book's reviews. Writing at the time of its first publication, historian Pearl Kibre sees the book as reflecting the continuity of medieval thought, rather than the break that was soon to come. Another contemporary reviewer, astronomer Nicholas T. Bobrovnikoff, while finding much to quibble about in the details of the book, seems perplexed both by its inclusion of non-astronomers and by its focus on parallax, writing that it would have been better to pay more attention to the direction of the comet's tail and what it would imply about the composition of comets. In contrast, at the book's republication in the 1970s, historian of science William H. Donahue credits Hellman with the recognition of the comet's role in the change in cosmology, calls her choice to include non-astronomical sources "admirable and powerful", and writes that, by focusing less on theoretical debates and more on thoroughly cataloging the works of the time, Hellman's book has become timeless, "ever assured a place in the first rank of works on the history of astronomy". By 1995, Albert van Helden, the Lynette S. Autrey Professor of History at Rice University, called her book "the standard treatment of the comet of 1577".

=== Kepler ===
German historian Max Caspar spent 50 years collecting and editing the works of Johannes Kepler. Kepler, his biography of Kepler, was originally published in German in 1948, and reprinted in 1950 and 1958, but until Hellman's translation there was nothing like it in English. Writing in Science, reviewer William D. Stahlman calls Caspar's book the definitive biography, and Hellman's translation excellent, smooth, and long-awaited. As well as translating Caspar's original text, Hellman also added footnotes with historical and biographical information, largely missing from the original, and corrected some errors. Some text written in Latin by Kepler and quoted by Caspar remains untranslated. The 1993 Dover edition added a new introduction and bibliography, contributed by Owen Gingerich and Alain Segonds. Reviewer Albert Van Helden described the book as standard and unchallenged as a biography of Kepler, and Hellman's translation as "beautiful".

== Recognition ==
Several learned societies honored Hellman by electing her as a member (or, for societies with open membership) to a higher honorary level of membership: She became a Fellow of the Royal Astronomical Society in 1960. She was elected to the International Academy of the History of Science in 1963, and became a full member in 1969. She was also a Fellow of the American Association for the Advancement of Science.

Hellman's papers are kept in the Columbia University Libraries.
