= Pierre Amable Jean-Baptiste Trannoy =

French physician and botanist (1772–1831)

- Born: 22 November 1772; Amiens, Somme, France
- Died: 26 March 1831 (aged 58); Amiens, Somme, France
- Education: Sorbonne University
- Scientific career
- Fields: Physician, botanist
- Workplaces: Civil hospices in Amiens
- Thesis: Sur le pronostic des affections sympathiques de l'œil dans les maladies aiguës (1801)

Pierre Amable Jean-Baptiste Trannoy (Amiens, Somme, 22 November 1772 – Amiens, 26 March 1831) was a French medical doctor, hygienist and botanist.

== Biography ==
Son of Jean-Baptiste Martin Trannoy and Marie-Catherine Julie Chopin he was first surgeon-major of a battalion of "réquisitionnaires" in his home town, then second surgeon at the Hôtel-Dieu d'Amiens on the Chaussée Saint-Leu.

In 1795, he went to Paris to attend medical courses at the Sorbonne.

In 1798, he was appointed curator and director of the Botanical Garden of Amiens and professor of natural history at the Central School of the Somme department a chair he held until this school was abolished in 1802.

In 1801, he submitted a medical thesis to the Faculty of Medicine in Paris, entitled: Sur le pronostic des affections sympathiques de l'œil dans les maladies aiguës (On the prognosis of sympathetic eye diseases in acute illnesses).

In 1807 and 1808, he was professor of anatomy, physiology, medical subjects and hygiene at the civil hospices in Amiens.

In 1815, he was appointed doctor of epidemics for the districts of Amiens and Dourlens (now Doullens).

In 1819, he wrote an Traité élémentaire des maladies épidémiques ou populaires à l'usage des officiers de santé (Elementary Treatise on Epidemic or Popular Diseases for the use of health officers).

This production, the fruit of observation, study and wise practice, was honourably mentioned in several medical journals and in various minutes of learned societies, and successively earned the author the title of associate member of the Medical Committee, the Athénée de Médecine, the Society of Practical Medicine, the Royal Academic Faculty of Sciences of the Faculty of Paris and the Royal Societies of Lyon and Bordeaux.

— Joseph-Marie Quérard

Trannoy is the author of a dissertation in response to these questions posed by the "Académie des sciences, belles-lettres et arts de Rouen" (Academy of Sciences, belles-lettres and arts of Rouen) put out to tender in 1822:

1. Is it proven that fevers by infection exist without being contagious?
2. What are the main causes that give rise to their development?
3. What are the appropriate means to prevent them or stop their progress?

This brief has fixed the attention of observant doctors who recognise that the simplest fevers, as a result of uncleanliness, the crowding of patients in places where there is little air circulation, produce symptoms of adynamia and ataxia, resulting in morbific emanations.

— Joseph-Marie Quérard

Joseph-Marie Quérard also notes that:

As a doctor of the poor, M. Trannoy inserted, in the newspapers, various observations that were welcomed with interest, especially the one where, through experiments on animals, he demonstrated that sugar is not the antidote for vert-de-gris poisoning, as M. Gallet had suggested.

— Joseph-Marie Quérard

== Works ==
- Catalogne de botanique, suivant le système de Linné
- Notice historique sur le jardin de botanique de l'école communale d'Amiens
- Tableau synoptique de l'organe des plantes
- Traité élémentaire des maladies épidémiques ou populaires (1819)
- Concordance de l'État atmosphérique avec les maladies régnantes à Amiens et dans ses environs (Concordance of the atmospheric state with the diseases prevailing in Amiens and its surroundings) from 1819 to 1826.
