= Ernest Gibbins =

English entomologist

- Born: 1900; Liverpool, England
- Died: 11 March 1942 (aged 41–42); Uganda
- Cause of death: Spear wounds
- Scientific career
- Fields: Entomology

Ernest Gerald Gibbins (1900 – 3 November 1942) was a British entomologist who worked on insects of medical importance. He described 26 new species. While researching tropical diseases in Uganda, he was speared to death by tribesmen who believed that he would use their blood samples for witchcraft.

== Background ==
Ernest Gerald Gibbins was born in Liverpool, England. Despite his early enthusiasm for natural history, he was not formally educated in biology. At Liverpool School of Tropical Medicine, part of the University of Liverpool, W.S. Patton and D.B. Blacklock noticed his devotion. They became his mentors and in 1930, they enabled him to take part in an entomological course. Gibbins remained closely tied to the Liverpool School of Tropical Medicine.

== Career ==
During the interwar period, Gibbins was recruited to the Colonial Service. Along with other entomologists and field officers, he was sent to serve in the East Africa Protectorate. Gibbins was assigned to field and laboratory work related to tropical diseases. In 1929, he joined the Malaria Unit of the Uganda Medical Department. In his early years as a member of the unit, he worked simultaneously on mosquitos and black flies. Work on the former brought led to his acquaintance with the mosquito expert Frederick Wallace Edwards. Gibbins was elected Fellow of the Royal Entomological Society. Gibbins accompanied Edwards on the 1934–1935 expedition to the Rwenzori Mountains, sponsored by British Museum (Natural History). He published papers on tsetse fly bionomics and control, enhanced by figures he himself drew. A 1939 paper written jointly with Edwards, concerning their findings, was among his last publications. His work on the black fly family (Simuliidae) was recognised in 1939, when he received an honorary Master of Science degree.

== Death and legacy ==
On 3 November 1942, Gibbins was travelling to spend Christmas at his home in Entebbe, Uganda, when his car was ambushed by Lugbara tribesmen, who speared him to death. Gibbins had taken human blood samples for his research into human African trypanosomiasis and yellow fever, but the tribesmen were convinced that he intended to use them in "white man's witchcraft". The investigating police officer described his body as being "as full of spears as a bloody porcupine". A year later, his insect collections were sent to British Museum (Natural History), now known as Natural History Museum.

Starting in 1933, Gibbins described 26 new species in 15 publications. A synonym for Byssodon, a subgenus of the black fly genus Simulium, was named Gibbinsiellum by I. A. Rubtsov in 1962 explicitly after Ernest Gibbins and in honour of his faunal and taxonomic studies. The mosquito species Anopheles gibbinsi and Aedes gibbinsi also bear his name.
