= On the Psychology of Military Incompetence =

Book about psychology

- First edition
- Author: Norman F. Dixon
- Genre: Non-fiction
- Publisher: Jonathan Cape
- Publication date: 1976

On The Psychology of Military Incompetence is a work by Norman F. Dixon, first published in 1976, which applies insights from psychology to military history. After case studies of military and naval disasters from the preceding 120 years, mostly British, it offers in readable, not technical, style and analysis of the personality of the unsuccessful leader. Its conclusions are equally applicable to other less deadly forms of human organisation.

== Synopsis ==
Starting from the premise that success or failure in military and naval operations may in large part be due to the personality of the general or admiral in command, the author first examines various historical disasters and the role of the commander in the resulting loss of life or liberty for the victims (which often included civilians as well).

Among major British case studies, he cites the blunders in the Crimean War by Raglan, followed by the blunders of Buller in the Second Boer War. In the First World War, he looks at the casualty list of Haig on the Western Front and the ineptitude of Townshend in Mesopotamia. Between the wars he castigates Britain for its failure to modernise its forces, which led to years of disaster on land, sea and (less so) in the air. During the Second World War, he covers Percival's failure to defend Singapore and Montgomery's over-bold effort to seize Arnhem (though he sees this as a tragic blot on an otherwise laudable career).

After this catalogue of incompetence, he addresses how such large and costly enterprises as armed forces can be put in the hands of men of such dubious calibre. Here he discerns a vicious circle: it is people of a certain type who are recruited and promoted, so others either do not apply or languish in insignificant positions. Among characteristics of the British officer class in the period under examination are: a narrow social segment admitted, scorn of intellectual and artistic endeavour, subservience to tradition, and emphasis on virility.

This leads, in his view, to the prevalence of an authoritarian type, fawning to superiors and often harsh or uncaring to inferiors. Such a man, by this analysis, is afraid of women (so only half human) and afraid of failure. He therefore ignores people and facts which do not conform to his world view, learns little from experience and clings to external rules, applying them even when the situation demands other approaches (for example Haig sacrificing hundreds of thousands of men he ordered to walk through mud into German machine gun fire). He may not be stupid, though some of the generals studied undoubtedly were, and he may be physically courageous, but his fatal lack is moral courage. Men like Townshend and Percival, caught in a trap by a more enterprising enemy, sat zombie-like until disaster overwhelmed them.

As a corrective, the author also mentions unequivocally great military and naval commanders like Napoleon, Wellington and Nelson who were far from this personality type.

== Reception ==
Even though some of the psychology theory may have dated, the work has attracted favourable reviews for over 40 years and is still considered a valuable text in studies of leadership. In January 2015, an annual list published by BookFinder revealed that it had been the most sought out-of-print book in the United States during the previous year.

== See also ==
- Military incompetence
