= Amelia Chopitea Villa =

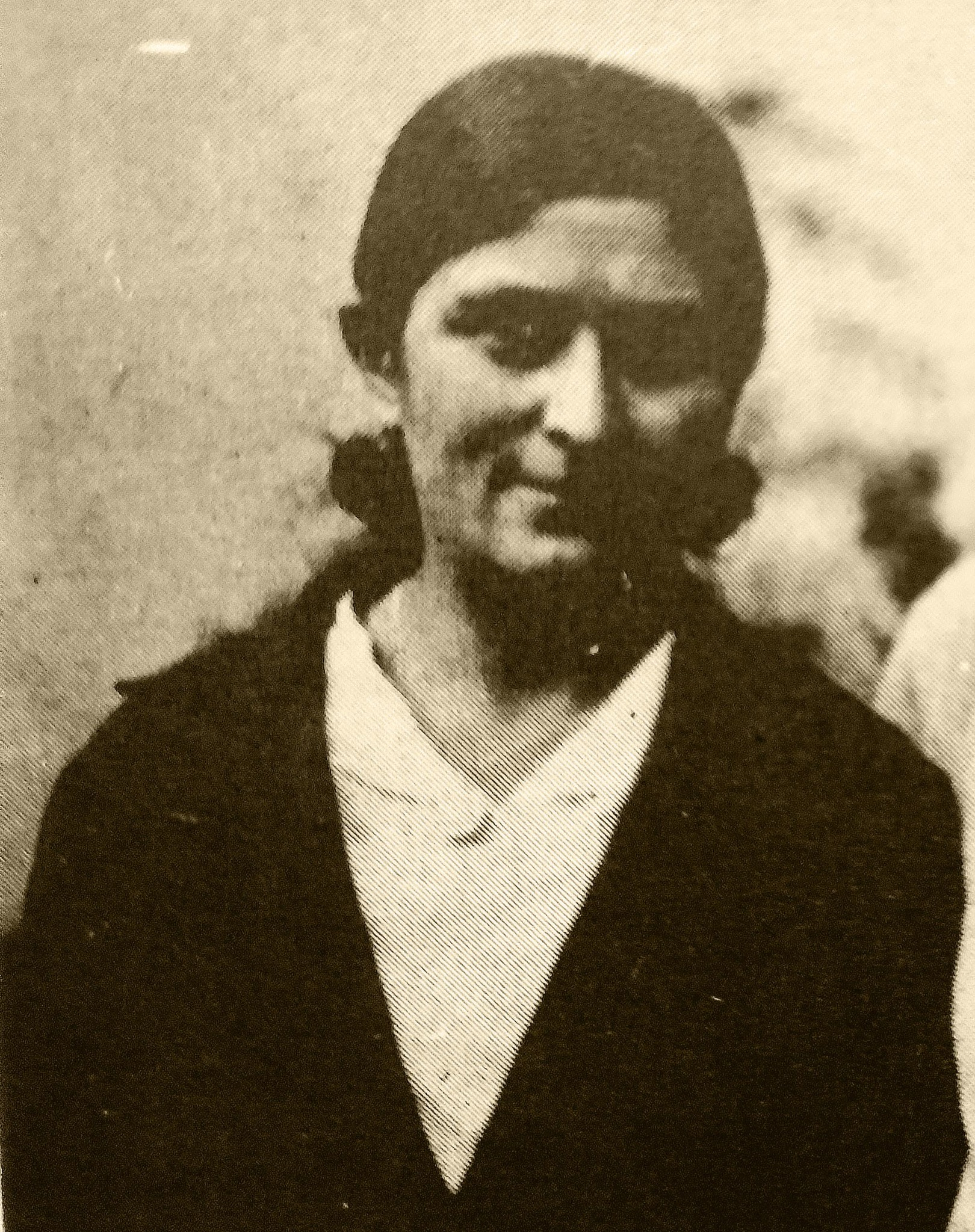
Image of Amelia Chopitea

María Amelia Chopitea Villa (20 March 1900 – 1942) was Bolivia's first female physician and writer. She was born in a time when the Bolivian society was very patriarchal.

== Early life and education ==
Chopitea Villa was born in Colquechaca, Potosí, Bolivia in 1900. Her parents were Adolfo Chopitea and Amelia Villa.

== Career ==
After receiving a bachelor's degree, Chopitea Villa entered the College of Medicine at the University of Saint Francis Xavier in Sucre, Bolivia in 1919, where she was an outstanding student. During the course of her university studies, she was designated as a student intern at the Santa Bárbara Hospital. Later she became the first Bolivian woman to study medicine. When she finished her university studies, she began to write her doctoral thesis, Causas de la mortalidad infantil, advised by Professor Nicolas Ortíz Antelo, was approved on 25 June 1926. It focused on the high infant mortality rate of the time. She began by referring to the extraordinary frequency of mortality in the environment, with all the shortcomings of the backwardness of the national communities. She presented a statistical approach on infant mortality and mortality from the years 1920 to 1925, where she demonstrated that for every one hundred children, 39% died. In the course of a year, 870 were born and 490 died. She finished her thesis expressing her appreciation to the teachers who lavished her with encouragement and enthusiasm, Drs. Leónidas Tardío, Domingo Guzmán, Jaime Mendoza, Walter Villafani, and had words of gratitude for her godfather, Dr. Nicolás Ortiz Antelo. She was Bolivia's first graduate student in the field of pediatrics.

In September 1926, Chopitea Villa went to Paris for further study, where she studied under numerous doctors and worked for several hospitals. such as Maternity Baudeloque, Tarnier, Efants Malades and many others. In April 1929, she represented Bolivia at the Congress of the Association internationale des femmes-médecins (Medical Women's International Association) in Paris; she was the only woman from South America. She returned to Bolivia, where she became a prominent surgeon, specializing in gynecology and pediatrics. She established the Pabellon de Niños (Children's Ward) at the Oruro Hospital. The Bolivian government honoured her for her work. and also helped the families of the soldiers during the Chaco War.

She was also listed in the Spanish-language book Quién es quién en Bolivia (Who is Who in Bolivia), published in 1942, the year of her death. Her sister, Elia Chopitea, also studied medicine, becoming the second woman doctor in Bolivia.

== Death and legacy ==
She died in 1942.

Chopitea Villa is one of the 999 women commemorated in the Heritage Floor as part of Judy Chicago's 1974–9 art installation The Dinner Party at the Brooklyn Museum.

== See also ==
- Health in Bolivia
- Women in Bolivia
