= Vestiges of the Natural History of Creation =

1844 work by Robert Chambers

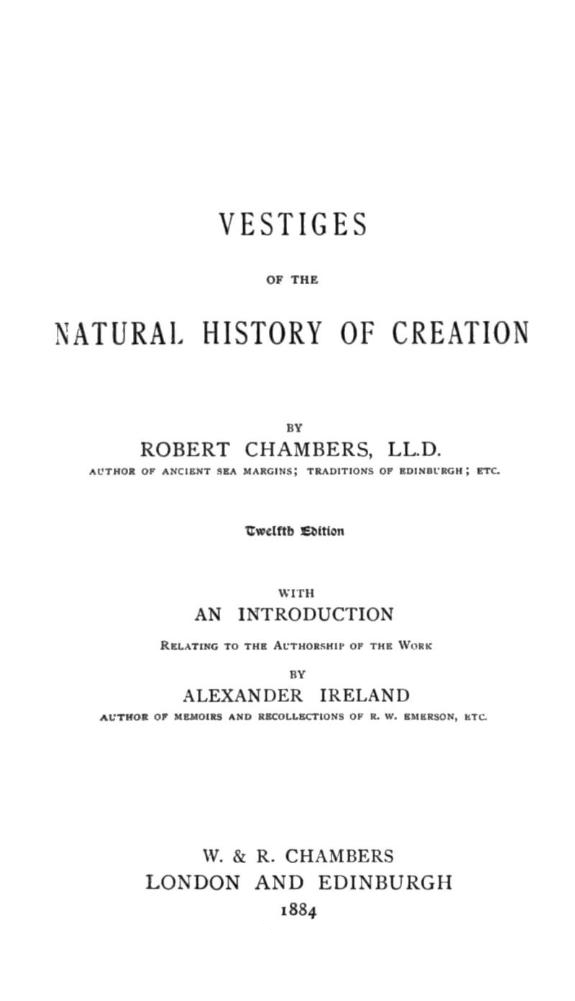
- Title page of the 12th edition of Vestiges of the Natural History of Creation (1884)
- Author: Robert Chambers
- Language: English
- Subject: Evolutionary biology
- Publisher: John Churchill
- Publication date: October 1844
- Publication place: United Kingdom

Vestiges of the Natural History of Creation is an 1844 work of speculative natural history and philosophy by Robert Chambers. Published anonymously in England, it brought together various ideas of stellar evolution with the progressive transmutation of species in an accessible narrative which tied together numerous scientific theories of the age.

Vestiges was initially well received by polite Victorian society and became an international bestseller, but its unorthodox themes contradicted the natural theology fashionable at the time and were reviled by clergymen – and subsequently by scientists who readily found fault with its amateurish deficiencies. The ideas in the book were favoured by Radicals, but its presentation remained popular with a much wider public. Prince Albert read it aloud to Queen Victoria in 1845. Vestiges caused a shift in popular opinion which – Charles Darwin believed – prepared the public mind for the scientific theories of evolution by natural selection which followed from the publication of On the Origin of Species in 1859.

For decades there was speculation about its authorship. The 12th edition, published in 1884, revealed officially that the author was Robert Chambers, a Scottish journalist, who had written the book in St Andrews between 1841 and 1844 while recovering from a psychiatric disturbance. Initially, Chambers had proposed the title The Natural History of Creation, but he was persuaded to revise the title in deference to the Scottish geologist James Hutton, who had remarked of the timeless aspect of geology: "no vestige of a beginning, no prospect of an end". Some of the inspiration for the work derived from the Edinburgh Phrenological Society whose materialist influence reached a climax between 1825 and 1840. George Combe, the leading proponent of phrenological thinking, had published his influential The Constitution of Man in 1828. Chambers was closely involved with Combe's associates William A. F. Browne and Hewett Cottrell Watson who did much to spell out the materialist theory of the mind.

== Publication ==
The book was published in October 1844 by John Churchill in London. Great pains were undertaken to secure the secret of its authorship from Churchill and the public. After Chambers completed each section, his wife copied the manuscript, because Chambers was well known in the trade. Alexander Ireland of Manchester delivered the manuscript to the publisher. Proofs were delivered by the printer, a Mr. Savill, back to Ireland, who forwarded them to Chambers. Chambers shared the secret with only four people: his wife, his brother William, Ireland, and Robert Cox. All correspondence to and from Chambers went through Ireland as intermediary.

== Content ==
Diagram from the first edition shows a model of development where fishes (F), reptiles (R), and birds (B) represent branches from a path leading to mammals (M).

"Vestiges is highly readable, but not always easy to understand."

— James A. Secord (1994) Introduction to the reprinted edition Vestiges of the Natural History of Creation, page xi.

The work puts forward a cosmic theory of transmutation, which we now call evolution, as the "natural history of creation". It suggests that everything currently in existence has developed from earlier forms: the Solar System, Earth, rocks, plants and corals, fish, land plants, reptiles and birds, mammals, and ultimately man.

The book begins by tackling the origins of the Solar System, using the nebular hypothesis to explain its formation entirely in terms of natural law. It explains the origins of life by spontaneous generation, citing some questionable experiments that claimed to spontaneously generate insects through electricity. It then appeals to geology to demonstrate a progression in the fossil record from simple to more complex organisms, finally culminating in man, with the Caucasian European the pinnacle of this process, just above the other races and the rest of the animal kingdom. It connected man’s mental reasoning power with the rest of the animals as an advanced evolutionary step that can be traced back through 'lower' animals. In this sense, the evolutionary ideas offered in Vestiges aimed to be all-encompassing.

It contains several comments relevant to recent debates, such as regarding Intelligent Design. For example:

Not one species of any creature which flourished before the tertiary (Ehrenberg's infusoria excepted) now exists; and of the mammalia which arose during that series, many forms are altogether gone, while of others we have now only kindred species. Thus to find not only frequent additions to the previous existing forms, but frequent withdrawals of forms which had apparently become inappropriate – a constant shifting as well as advance – is a fact calculated very forcibly to arrest attention. A candid consideration of all these circumstances can scarcely fail to introduce into our minds a somewhat different idea of organic creation from what has hitherto been generally entertained. (p. 152)

In other words, the fact of extinction, which can be observed in the fossil layers, suggests that some designs were flawed. From this, the author concludes:

Some other idea must then come to with regard to the mode in which the Divine Author proceeded in the organic creation. (p. 153)

But this suggestion is not a mechanism, as Darwin would argue fifteen years later. The author merely notes that a continually active God is unnecessary:

...how can we suppose that the august Being who brought all these countless worlds into form by the simple establishment of a natural principle flowing from his mind, was to interfere personally and specially on every occasion when a new shell-fish or reptile was to be ushered into existence on one of these worlds? Surely this idea is too ridiculous to be for a moment entertained. (p. 154)

He furthermore suggests that this interpretation may be based upon corrupt theology:

Thus, the scriptural objection quickly vanishes, and the prevalent ideas about the organic creation appear only as a mistaken inference from the text, formed at a time when man's ignorance prevented him from drawing therefrom a just conclusion. (p. 156)

And praises God for his foresight in generating such wondrous variety from so elegant a method, while chastening those who would oversimplify His accomplishment:

To a reasonable mind the Divine attributes must appear, not diminished or reduced in some way, by supposing a creation by law, but infinitely exalted. It is the narrowest of all views of the Deity, and characteristic of a humble class of intellects, to suppose him acting constantly in particular ways for particular occasions. It, for one thing, greatly detracts from his foresight, the most undeniable of all the attributes of Omnipotence. It lowers him towards the level of our own humble intellects. Much more worthy of him it surely is, to suppose that all things have been commissioned by him from the first, though neither is he absent from a particle of the current of natural affairs in one sense, seeing that the whole system is continually supported by his providence. (pp. 156–157)

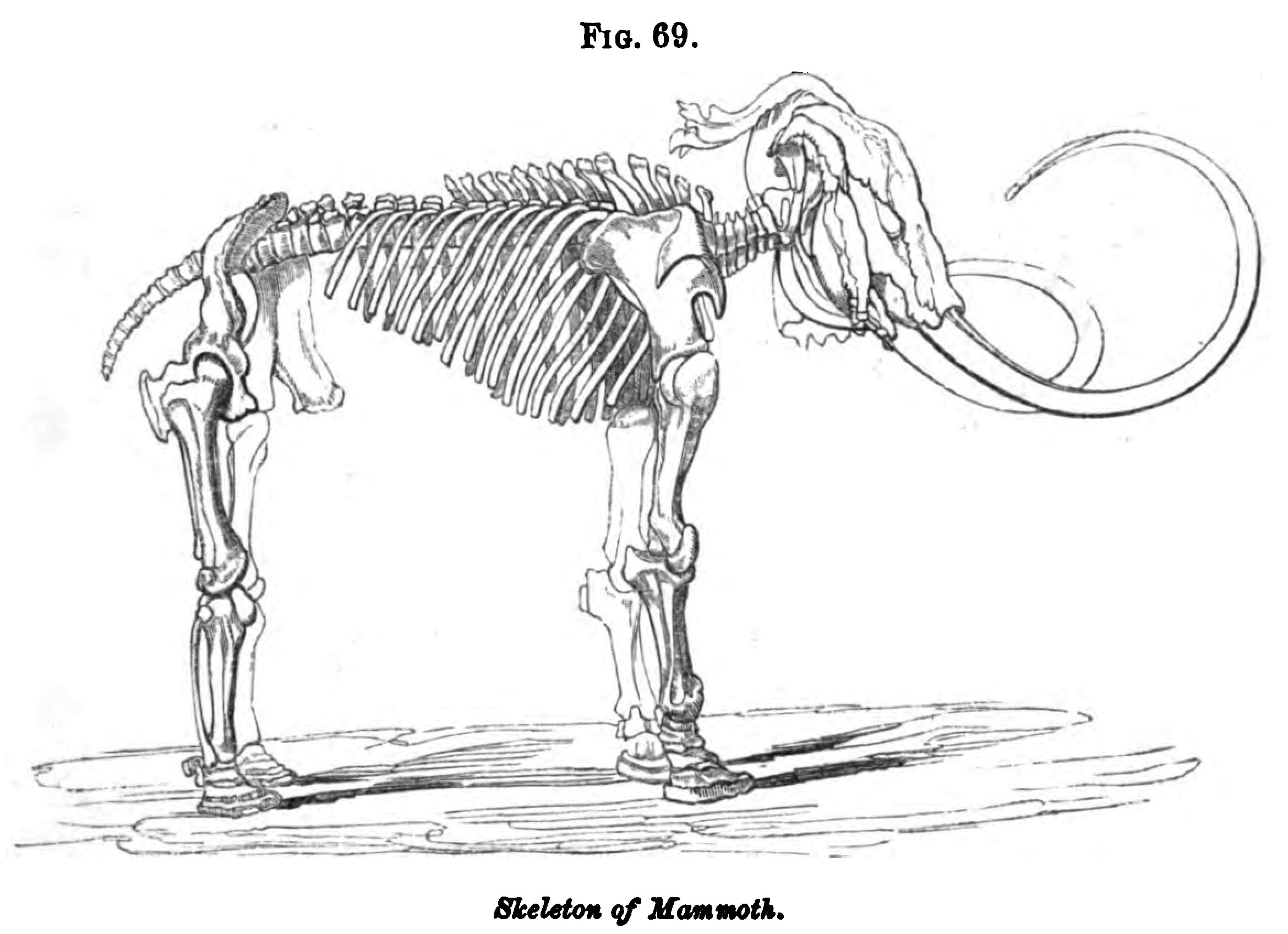
Skeleton of an extinct mammoth. One of over a hundred woodcut illustrations introduced in the 10th edition of Vestiges published in 1853.

Following its publication, there was increasing support for ideas of the coexistence of God and Nature, with the deity setting Natural Laws rather than continually intervening with miracles. It is perhaps for this reason that On the Origin of Species was accepted so readily upon its eventual publication. On the other hand, the knowledge of the scandal and experience of the reaction of his scientist friends confirmed Darwin's reluctance to publish his own ideas until he had well researched answers to all possible objections (though, in the end, Darwin had to publish earlier than he had wanted to anyway).

=== Vestiges and Lamarck ===
"No vestige of a beginning, no prospect of an end..." James Hutton (1785) The Theory of the Earth.

The book argued for an evolutionary view of life in the same spirit as the late Frenchman Jean-Baptiste Lamarck. Lamarck had long been discredited among intellectuals by the 1840s and evolutionary (or development) theories were exceedingly unpopular, except among the political radicals, materialists, and atheists. Charles Lyell had thoroughly criticized Lamarck's ideas in the second edition of his monumental work Principles of Geology. Thus, it was naturally tempting for some critics to simply dismiss Vestiges as Lamarckian. Chambers, however, tried to explicitly distance his own theory from that of Lamarck's by denying Lamarck's evolutionary mechanism any plausibility.

Now it is possible that wants and the exercise of faculties have entered in some manner into the production of the phenomena which we have been considering; but certainly not in the way suggested by Lamarck, whose whole notion is obviously so inadequate to account for the rise of the organic kingdoms, that we only can place it with pity among the follies of the wise. (p. 231)

In an (anonymous) autobiographical preface written in the third person that only appeared in the 10th edition, Chambers remarked that "He had heard of the hypothesis of Lamarck; but it seemed to him to proceed upon a vicious circle, and he dismissed it as wholly inadequate to account for the existence of animated species."

== Reception ==
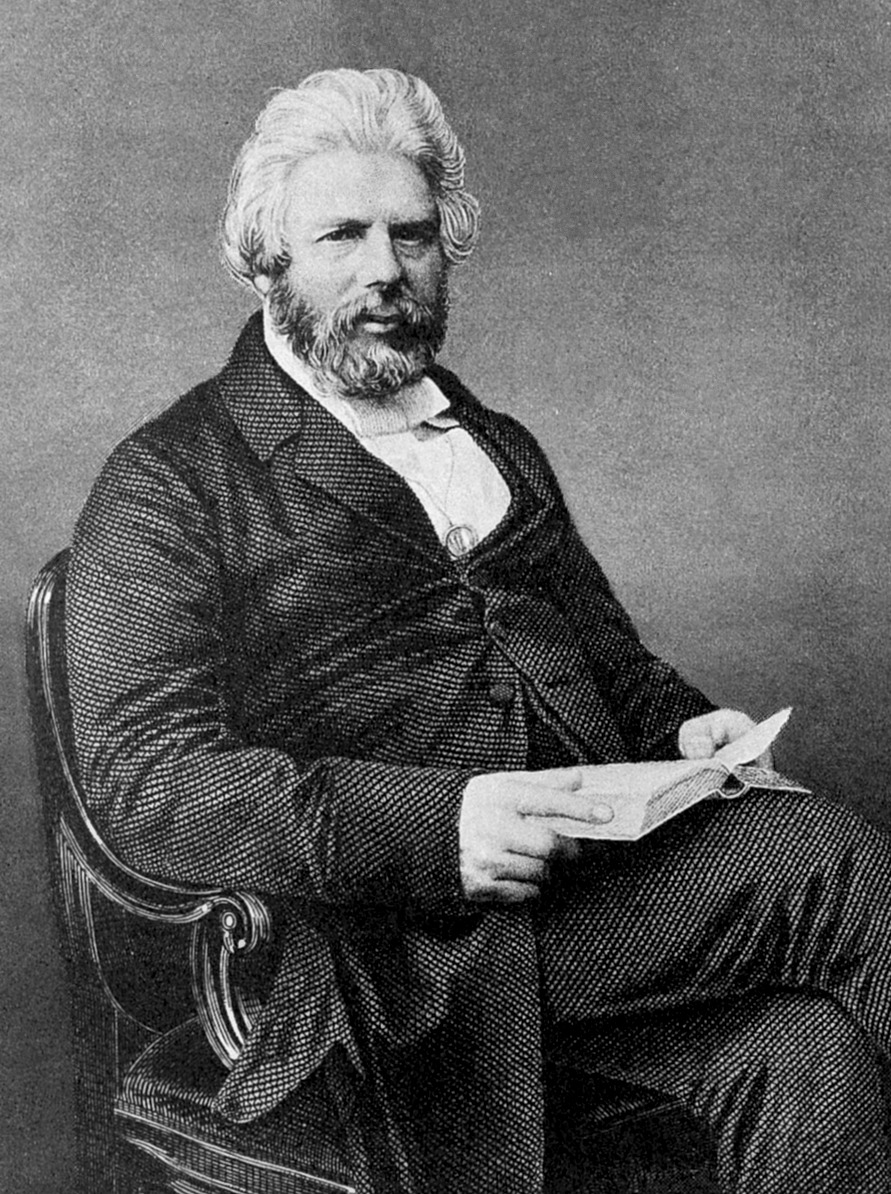
Robert Chambers, the anonymous author of Vestiges

The book quickly became a best-seller, and a sensation which was eagerly read in royal circles. Every afternoon for a period early in 1845, Prince Albert read it aloud to Queen Victoria as a suitable popular science book explaining the latest ideas from the continent. Abraham Lincoln's law partner and biographer William Herndon recalled that Lincoln had read the book with great interest in its "doctrine of development or evolution" and had been "deeply impressed with the notion of the so-called 'universal law' – evolution." It was well received by middle class readers and unorthodox clergymen, particularly of Nonconformist church groups such as Unitarians. At first scientists ignored the book and it took time before hostile reviews were published, but the book was then publicly denounced by scientists, preachers, and statesmen. Notably, Sir David Brewster, then the Principal of St Andrews University, wrote a very critical review of the work in the North British Review, where he stated:

Discoveries in geology, or in physics imperfectly developed, and portions of Scripture imperfectly interpreted, might be expected to place themselves in temporary collision; but who could have anticipated any general speculations on the natural history of creation, which would startle the pious student, or for a moment disturb the serenity of the Christian world? Such an event, however, has occurred, and on the author of the work before us rests its responsibility. Prophetic of infidel times, and indicating the unsoundness of our general education, "The Vestiges of the Natural History of Creation," has started into public favour with a fair chance of poisoning the fountains of science, and sapping the foundations of religion. Popular in its subject, as well as in its expositions, this volume has obtained a wide circulation among the influential classes of society. It has been read and applauded by those who can neither weigh its facts, nor appreciate its argument, nor detect its tendencies; while those who can - the philosopher, the naturalist, and the divine - have concurred in branding it with their severest censure.

Since around 1800, ideas of evolutionism had been denounced as examples of dangerous materialism, which undermined natural theology and the argument from design, threatening the current moral and social order. Such ideas were propagated by lower class Radicals seeking to overturn divine justification of the (aristocratic) social order. Chambers supported middle class political interests, and saw laws of progress in nature as implying inevitable political progress. He sought to sanitise the radical tradition by presenting progressive evolution as an unfolding of divinely planned laws of creation as development up to and including the appearance of human species. The political climate had eased as increasing prosperity reduced fears of revolution, and the book was widely considered to be merely scandalous and titillating. It was read not only by members of high society, but also – thanks to the rise of cheap publishing – the lower and middle classes, and continued to sell in large quantities for the rest of the 19th century.

The establishment might have tolerated a predesigned law of creation, but Vestiges presented a progressive law with humanity as its goal, and thus continuity which treated the human race as the last step in the ascent of animal life. It included arguments that mental and moral faculties were not unique to humans, but resulted from expansion of brain size during this ascent. This materialism was rejected by the religious and scientific establishment, and scientists were incensed that Chambers had bypassed their authority by appealing directly to the reading public and reaching a wide audience.

=== Early praise ===
The publisher John Churchill had, as instructed, distributed free review copies to numerous daily and weekly newspapers, and many carried advertisements giving one line quotations or ran excerpts from the book, with even the Scottish evangelical Witness giving it publicity and credence in this way. Several carried substantial reviews, one of the first appearing in mid November 1844 in the weekly reform newspaper the Examiner:

In this small and unpretending volume, we have found so many great results of knowledge and reflection, that we cannot too earnestly recommend it to the attention of thoughtful men. It is the first attempt that has been made to connect the natural sciences into a history of creation. An attempt which presupposed learning, extensive and various; but not the large and liberal wisdom, the profound philosophical suggestion, the lofty spirit of beneficence, and the exquisite grace of manner which make up the charm of this extraordinary book.

As a result of this publicity the first edition of 1,750 copies sold out in a few days. Among those fortunate enough to have ordered their copy promptly, Tennyson commented to his bookseller that the review suggested it "seems to contain many speculations with which I have been familiar for years, and on which I have written more than one poem." Having read the book, he concluded "There was nothing degrading in the theory." Benjamin Disraeli told his sister that the book was "convulsing the world, anonymous" and his wife told her that "Dizzy says it does and will cause the greatest sensation and confusion."

The limited number of copies available at first were targeted at a select fashionable readership. The late Autumn literary season was just getting under way as the first reviews appeared, and by early January the book was the subject of conversations at elite literary gatherings. At venues such as Buckingham Palace and Lady Byron's parties, cosmic evolution became a topic of discussion for the first time in many years. Reforming medical journals including The Lancet for 23 November 1844 carried favourable reviews, while criticising specific points. In January the Unitarian quarterly Prospective gave powerful support, but the influential prestige quarterlies which could determine the long term success of books were still looking for reviewers.

=== First criticism ===
Early in 1845 critical reviews appeared in the Athenaeum, the Literary Gazette and The Gardeners' Chronicle. The most authoritative scientific and literary weekly was the Athenaeum, and its anonymous review of 4 January was by Edwin Lankester. Churchill had already been alarmed by The Lancet's report of numerous mistakes, and had been surprised to find that, unlike the medical specialists he usually dealt with, the author of Vestiges lacked first hand knowledge of the subject or the ability to correct proofs. At the author's request he had quoted for a people's edition, but was unwilling to proceed with this cheap reprint until errors had been corrected. Churchill engaged Lankester to make corrections to terminology to the second edition published in December 1844, and both Lankaster and George Fownes made further revisions for the third edition.

While the season's fashionable use of Vestiges as a conversation piece in London society avoided theological implications, the book was read very differently in Liverpool, where it was first made public that men of science condemned the book, and it became the subject of sustained debate in newspapers. The book was attractive to reformers, including Uniformitarians and William Ballantyne Hodgson, the principal of the Mechanics' Institution who, like Chambers, had become a supporter of George Combe's ideas. In defence of public morals and Evangelical Tory dominance in the city, the Reverend Abraham Hume, an Anglican priest and lecturer, delivered a detailed attack on Vestiges at the Liverpool Literary and Philosophical Society on 13 January 1845, demonstrating that the book conflicted with standard specialist scientific texts on nebulae, fossils and embryos, and accusing it of manipulative novelistic techniques occupying "the debatable ground between science and fiction". At the next meeting two weeks later John Robberds, son of John Gooch Robberds the minister, defended the book as well-intentioned and based on "deep reflection and extensive research", while noting that he considered it inconsistent in distinguishing miracles from natural law, against his Unitarian views. As subsequent debates appeared inconclusive, Hume wrote to leading men of science for authoritative expert opinions, and made the responses public to resolve the dispute. This backfired when a writer in the Liverpool Journal pointed out inconsistencies and contradictions between the various expert opinions. They only agreed on the point that Vestiges was unscientific, and the publication of their letters was considered bad manners as well as tactically unwise. Few of the experts would have allowed any direct reference to the book to be published under their names, and their gentlemanly disagreements to be made public.

Anglican clergymen were usually quick to publish pamphlets on any theological controversy, but tended to excuse themselves from responding to Vestiges as they lacked expertise: men of science were expected to lead the counterattack. The universities of Oxford and Cambridge were part of the Anglican establishment, intended to educate Christian gentlemen with half of the students becoming clergymen. Science subjects were optional lectures. The professors were scientific clergymen with strong reputations, and at Cambridge science had developed as natural theology, but there was no unified scientific establishment. The quarterly review magazines turned to them for commentary on the book, but demonstrating that it was superficial was difficult when its range of topics meant experts being drawn into superficial responses outside their own area of intensive expertise. William Whewell refused all requests for a review to avoid dignifying the "bold, speculative and false" work, but was the first to give a response, publishing Indications of a Creator in mid February 1845 as a slim and elegant volume of "theological extracts" from his writings. His aim was to inform superficial London society used to skimming books as conversation pieces and lacking properly prepared minds to deal with real philosophy and real science, and he avoided mentioning Vestiges by name. During the crucial early months of the debate this and Hume's lecture distributed as a pamphlet were the only responses to Vestiges published by the established clergy, and there were just two other short works opposing it: a published lecture by the Anabaptist preacher John Sheppard, and an unorthodox anti-science piece by Samuel Richard Bosanquet.

There was a wide range of readings of the book among the aristocracy interested in science, who assessed it independently without dismissing it out of hand. Sir John Cam Hobhouse wrote his thoughts down in his diary: "In spite of the allusions to the creative will of God the cosmogony is atheistic—at least the introduction of an author of all things seems very like a formality for the sake of saving appearances—it is not a necessary part of the scheme". While disquieted by its information on embryology implying human origins from animals, he thought its tone was good. He concluded that "It does not meddle with revealed religion—but unless I am mistaken the leaders of revealed religion will meddle with it." Lord Morpeth thought it had "much that is able, startling, striking" and progressive development did not conflict with Genesis more than then current geology, but did "not care much for the notion that we are engendered by monkeys" and objected strongly to the idea that the Earth was "a member of a democracy" of similar planets.

Vestiges was published in New York, and in response the April 1845 issue of the North American Review published a long review, the start of which was scathing about its reliance on speculative scientific theories: "The writer has taken up almost every questionable fact and startling hypothesis, that have been promulgated by proficients and pretenders in science during the present century...The nebular hypothesis...spontaneous generation...the Macleay system, dogs playing dominoes, negroes born of white parents, materialism, phrenology, - he adopts them all, and makes them play an important part in his own magnificent theory, to the exclusion, to a great degree, of the well-accredited facts and established doctrines of science."

=== Scientific gentlemen respond ===
The Reverend Adam Sedgwick, the Woodwardian Professor of Geology at Cambridge, was popular and well regarded, having recently strongly defended the new geology against the Reverend Sir William Cockburn, a Scriptural geologist. He turned down several invitations to review Vestiges, pleading lack of time, but in March read it closely and on 6 April discussed with other leading clergymen the "rank materialism" of the book "against which work he & all other scientific men are indignant". He thought the "hasty jumping to conclusions" indicated a female author. In a letter to Charles Lyell about "the foul book", he expressed his disgust: "If the book be true, the labours of sober induction are in vain; religion is a lie; human law is a mass of folly, and a base injustice; morality is moonshine; our labours for the black people of Africa were works of madmen; and man and woman are only better beasts! .... I cannot but think the work is from a woman's pen, it is so well dressed and so graceful in its externals. I do not think the 'beast man' could have done this part so well." On 10 April he contacted Macvey Napier, editor of the Edinburgh Review, who quickly accepted the offer. Sedgwick was rather disorganised and had not written a review before. To save time batches of his writing were typeset on arrival, so one part was being printed "while the other part was still uncoiling from my brain in Cambridge." Napier did not insist on the usual concise review, but as it was still arriving in mid May stopped it at what became 85 pages, one of the longest reviews the quarterly ever published.

The British Association for the Advancement of Science annual meeting was held at Cambridge in June 1845, giving its president John Herschel a platform to counter Vestiges. His presidential address contrasted the "sound and thoughtful and sobering discipline" of the scientific brotherhood with the "over-hasty generalisation" and "pure speculation" of the unnamed book. He had a cold and his words were badly delivered, but they appeared in newspapers across the country as its most prestigious man of science dismissing the book. For the rest of the week attacks on Vestiges continued. In the geology section, Roderick Murchison used his lecture to clear up the confusion between competing views, and say that "every piece of geological evidence sustained the belief that each species was perfect in its kind when first called into being by the Creator". Sedgwick set aside his differences with Murchison to summarise his forthcoming Edinburgh review and agree in opposing the evolutionary ideas and the "desolating pantheism" of the book.

Sedgwick's long, rambling and scathing article was published in the July 1845 edition of the Edinburgh Review. Articles were anonymous, but he ensured that his authorship was well known. He had disregarded William Whewell's caution about attempting a point by point refutation, and the body of his review followed the structure of Vestiges, packed with current evidence to undermine the supposition of continuous transitions underlying the progressive development hypothesis which he scorned as mere speculation, and pointing out errors showing the inadequate expertise of the author. Vestiges crucially undermined the separation between man and beast, and endangered hopes for the afterlife. Sedgwick expressed concern for "our glorious maidens and matrons .... listening to the seductions of this author; who comes before them with a bright, polished, and many-coloured surface, and the serpent coils of a false philosophy, and asks them again to stretch out their hands and pluck forbidden fruit", who tells them "that their Bible is a fable when it teaches them that they were made in the image of God—that they are the children of apes and breeders of monsters—that he has annulled all distinction between physical and moral", which in Sedgwick's view would lead to "a rank, unbending and degrading materialism" lacking the proper reading of nature as analogy to draw moral lessons from physical truths. That needed the use of reason by great men who believed that "moral truth is the ennobled form of material truth" and that "all nature, both material and moral, has been framed and supported by one creative mind" so that one truth could never be in conflict with another. In presenting natural law as explaining the soul, Vestiges threatened the fine balance between faith and science.

Journals that had already opposed the book welcomed Sedgwick's article, with the Literary Gazette calling it a "scourging and irrefragable review", as did sections of the church which were suspicious of science and geology. However, its crude vehemence was ill-suited to fashionable society, and Whewell wrote "To me the material appears excellent, but the workmanship bad, and I doubt if it will do its work." Aristocrats found its "lengthy inefficiency" heavy going, and John Gibson Lockhart of the Tory Quarterly Review suspected that "The savants are all sore at the vestige man because they are likely to be in the same boat as him." The extreme liberal press also thought "a mere anonymous bookmaker might well be sacrificed to evidence the orthodoxy of a Cambridge divine", in the hope of "immunity to their own speculations, by a cheap display of eloquent zeal against all who dare to go beyond their measure."

=== Explanations: A Sequel ===
There was renewed debate in correspondence in newspapers. The publisher Churchill advised the anonymous author against meeting attacks by going to the people with a cheap edition, and was told that the author was "writing a defence of the book, with particular reference to the coarse attack of Mr. Sedgfield", with the intention of publishing it as letters to The Times followed by a pamphlet. On Churchill's advice the response was broadened into a 206-page book bound to match the original work, which was published at the end of 1845 at a price of five shillings under the title of Explanations: A Sequel to the Vestiges of the Natural History of Creation, a "forcible and argumentative work" aimed at "convincing open-minded men", published anonymously "By the author of that work". The revised fifth edition of Vestiges was ready in January 1846, and the two were commonly sold together, catching the publicity from reviews of Explanations.

The North British Review reflected evangelical Presbyterian willingness to consider science in relation to "Reason and not to Faith" and to view natural law as directly guided by God, but warned that "If it has been revealed to man that the Almighty made him out of the dust of the earth, and breathed into his nostrils the breath of life, it is in vain to tell a Christian that man was originally a speck of albumen, and passed through the stages of monads and monkeys, before he attained his present intellectual pre-eminence." Many women admired the book, and "It would augur ill for the rising generation if the mothers of England were infected with the errors of Phrenology: it would augur worse were they tainted with materialism."

Chambers planned one more "edition for the higher classes and for libraries", extensively revised to deal with errors and incorporate the latest science, such as the detail of the Orion Nebula revealed by Lord Rosse's giant telescope. Use of generous spacing and the additional text extended the book by 20%, and the price had to be increased from 7s.6d. to nine shillings. The identical text was used for the long-awaited people's edition, which was smaller with cheap bindings, smaller lettering and more closely spaced text. The cheap edition was printed first, but set aside until after the gentlemen's edition was published so that it would appear as a reprint of the expensive 6th edition, and not the other way around. The price was only 2s.6d. and five thousand copies were issued, almost as many as the first four editions combined. It sold well, though sales of the expensive edition were slow.

Sedgwick added a 400+ page preface to the 5th edition of his Discourse on the Studies of the University of Cambridge (1850), including a lengthy attack on Vestiges and theories of development in general.

Among religious criticisms, some maintained that Chambers' use of "natural law" to explain the creation of the planets and the successive creation of new species, including man, excluded the possibility of miracles and providential control. In other words, under this scheme, God did not personally interact with His creation after bringing forth these initial Laws. For these critics, this was akin to denying the central miracle of Christianity and, therefore, Christianity itself.

== Influence and effects ==
=== Darwin and Vestiges ===
Among the early readers of Vestiges, Charles Darwin had conceived his own theory of natural selection to explain evolution six years earlier, and in July 1844 had written down his ideas in an '"Essay". For a year he had been tentatively discussing his evolutionary ideas in correspondence with Joseph Dalton Hooker, who wrote to Darwin on 30 December 1844 that he had "been delighted with Vestiges, from the multiplicity of facts he brings together, though I do [not] agree with his conclusions at all, he must be a funny fellow: somehow the book looks more like a 9 days wonder than a lasting work: it certainly is "filling at the price".— I mean the price its reading costs, for it is dear enough otherwise; he has lots of errors." Darwin had read the book in November, finding that it drew on some of the lines of evidence he had been putting together, and introduced questions that had to be dealt with. He responded that he had been "somewhat less amused at it .... the writing & arrangement are certainly admirable, but his geology strikes me as bad, & his zoology far worse. Darwin had learnt geology from Adam Sedgwick, and was particularly interested in what his former mentor had to say about evolution. In October 1845 he wrote to his friend Charles Lyell that Sedgwick's review was a "grand piece of argument against mutability of species" which he had read with "fear & trembling," but had been "well pleased to find" that he had anticipated Sedgwick's objections and "had not overlooked any of the arguments".

He read Explanations early in 1846 and thought "the spirit of [it], though not the facts, ought to shame Sedgwick", while noting speculation and evidence suggesting that Chambers had written the books. In April 1847, after meeting Chambers then subsequently receiving a presentation of Vestiges, Darwin became convinced that Chambers must have been the author.

In his introduction to On the Origin of Species, published in 1859, Darwin assumed that his readers were aware of Vestiges, and wrote identifying what he felt was one of its gravest deficiencies with regards to its theory of biological evolution:

The author of the Vestiges of Creation would, I presume, say that, after a certain unknown number of generations, some bird had given birth to a woodpecker, and some plant to the mistletoe, and that these had been produced perfect as we now see them; but this assumption seems to me to be no explanation, for it leaves the case of the coadaptations of organic beings to each other and to their physical conditions of life, untouched and unexplained.

Chambers took the publication of the Origin as an opportunity to release a new edition of Vestiges and respond to Darwin's comments, lamenting that Darwin had misunderstood the Vestiges. "It seems to the author," Chambers wrote, "that Mr. Darwin has only been enabled by his infinitely superior knowledge to point out a principle in what may be called practical animal life, which appears capable of bringing about the modifications theoretically assumed in the earlier work. His book, in no essential respect, contradicts the present: on the contrary...it expresses substantially the same general ideas." In perhaps a gross simplification, Chambers concludes that "The difference seems to be in words, not in facts or effects." At the very least, Chambers saw in Darwin a much needed ally – one that he simply could not afford to have against him.

It is probable that Darwin read Chambers's comments, because he removed the offending passage from the 3rd edition of the Origin (1861) and all subsequent editions. In a historical sketch, newly added to the 3rd edition, Darwin softened his language a bit:

The author apparently believes that organisation progresses by sudden leaps, but that the effects produced by the conditions of life are gradual. He argues with much force on general grounds that species are not immutable productions. But I cannot see how the two supposed "impulses" account in a scientific sense for the numerous and beautiful co-adaptations which we see throughout nature; I cannot see that we thus gain any insight how, for instance, a woodpecker has become adapted to its peculiar habits of life. The work, from its powerful and brilliant style, though displaying in the earlier editions little accurate knowledge and a great want of scientific caution, immediately had a very wide circulation.

Darwin even suggested that Chambers' book helped pave the way for the publication of his theory of evolution by natural selection. "In my opinion it has done excellent service in this country in calling attention to the subject, in removing prejudice, and in thus preparing the ground for the reception of analogous views."

The harsh reception that Vestiges received, and the mockery which was made of its evolutionary ideas, has been cited by some historians as a factor leading to Darwin's caution in publishing his own theory of evolution. In a letter to Thomas Henry Huxley in 1854 (five years before his own book on evolution was published but twelve years after its ideas had first been sketched out in an unpublished essay), Darwin expressed sympathy for the (still anonymous) author of Vestiges in the face of a savage review by Huxley: "I must think that such a book, if it does no other good, spreads the taste for Natural Science. But I am perhaps no fair judge, for I am almost as unorthodox about species as the Vestiges itself, though I hope not quite so unphilosophical." However, later the same year, in a letter to Hooker, Darwin mentioned Vestiges in a more sober tone: "I should have less scruple in troubling you if I had any confidence what my work would turn out. Sometimes I think it will be good, at other times I really feel as much ashamed of myself as the author of the Vestiges ought to be of himself."

According to the historian James A. Secord, Vestiges outsold The Origin of Species up until the early 20th century.

=== Influence on A. R. Wallace ===
It was reading Vestiges in 1845 that first inclined Alfred Russel Wallace to believe that the transmutation of species occurred. It was this belief that would lead him to plan his early field work with the idea of collecting data on the geographic distribution of closely allied species in hopes of finding evidence to support the idea. Wallace made the following comments on the concept of transmutation of species as described in Vestiges in a letter to Henry Bates a few months after first reading it:

I have a rather more favourable opinion of the 'Vestiges' than you appear to have. I do not consider it a hasty generalization, but rather as an ingenious hypothesis strongly supported by some striking facts and analogies, but which remains to be proved by more facts and the additional light which more research may throw upon the problem. It furnishes a subject for every observer of nature to attend to; every fact he observes will make either for or against it, and it thus serves both as an incitement to the collection of facts, and an object to which they can be applied when collected.

== Authorship ==
Because the book was published anonymously, speculation on the authorship naturally began as soon as it was released. Many people were suspected, including Charles Darwin ("I ought to be much flattered & unflattered"), the geologist Charles Lyell, and the phrenologist George Combe, as well as many of the people whose work the book often cited. Early on, Sir Richard Vyvyan, the Tory leader of the parliamentary opposition to the Reform Bill, was a popular suspect. Vyvyan held interests in natural philosophy, phrenology, and Lamarckian evolution. Only three years earlier he had privately printed his own evolutionary cosmology, a copy of which he sent to the English anatomist Richard Owen. The latter likely explains the discrepancy between Owen's critical letter to William Whewell on the Vestiges and his flattering letter to the author, whom he probably thought to be Vyvyan. It was even suggested at one point that Prince Albert might have secretly written it. Adam Sedgwick, as well as others, initially thought that the work was likely written by a woman, either Harriet Martineau or the Countess Ada Lovelace. A feminine authorship was thought to explain all of the book's scientific failings.

Robert Chambers became a prominent suspect as early as the spring of 1845. In 1854, following the publication of the 10th edition of Vestiges along with its anonymous biographical sketch, a former assistant named David Page accused Chambers directly. The accusation was printed in the Athenaeum, but because Page was an embittered former employee of the Chambers's firm, his testimony was not taken very seriously. Vyvyan finally denied that he was the author outright and the British Museum listed the book under George Combe's name as late as 1877.

After Robert's death in 1871 his brother, William, penned a biography for Robert but refused to reveal the secret. He only mentioned the Vestiges to note that Robert's suspected authorship was used as a means to discredit him when he ran for the office of Lord Provost of Edinburgh in 1848. The secret was finally revealed in 1884, when Alexander Ireland issued a new 12th edition with Robert's name and an introduction explaining the circumstances behind its publication.

== Editions of Vestiges and Explanations ==
=== Vestiges ===
Chambers made important revisions to the book, refining his arguments, addressing the many criticisms and reacting to new scientific publications. He added and deleted whole sections so that the content of the last edition differs substantially from that of the first.

Edition	Date	Pages	Copies	Notes
1	1844 Oct	vi, 390	750
2	1844 Dec	vi, 394	1000	Mainly small corrections.
3	1845 Feb	iv, 384	1500	Removes most of discussion on quinarian classification.
4	1845 May	iv, 408	2000	Many small changes to geological chapters.
5	1846 Jan	iv, 423	1500	Introduces experimental evidence for the nebular hypothesis. Corrections to geology. Removes all mention of quinarianism.
6	1847 Mar	iv, 512	1000	Many revisions in response to criticism.
7	1847 May	iv, 294	5000	Cheap edition with same text as 6th edition.
8	1850 Jul	vi, 319	3000	Cheap edition. "Note Conclusory" rewritten.
9	1851 Jul	iv, 316	3000	Cheap edition.
10	1853 Jun	xii, 325, lxvii	2500	Includes autobiographical preface and 107 woodcut illustrations chosen by the physiologist William Carpenter. Adds section on fossils in older rocks, deletes "Note Conclusory" and adds appendix containing responses to criticism.
11	1860 Dec	iv, 286, lxiv	2500	Removes autobiographical preface. Includes a 3-page discussion of Darwin's recently published Origin in an appendix.
12	1884 Apr	vi, 418, lxxxii	5000	Text as in the 11th edition but includes an introduction by Ireland revealing that Robert Chambers is the author.

Many of the editions were reprinted in the United States. At least 14 versions are known; published by Wiley and Putnam, New York (two in 1845, 1846), Colyer, New York (1846), Harper, New York (1847, 1854, 1856, 1858, 1859, 1860, 1862, 1868) and James, Cincinnati (1852, 1858). After 1846, the American editions usually included Explanations.

=== Explanations ===
Edition	Date	Pages	Copies
1	1845 Dec	vii, 198	1500
2	1846 Jul	vii, 205	1500

=== Translations of Vestiges ===
The book was translated to five languages. The first translation, into German, was by A. F. Seubert (Becher, Stuttgart, 1846) followed by the Dutch version prepared by J. H. van den Broek (Broese, Utrecht, 1849 and 1850). A second German translation was completed by Carl Vogt (F. Vieweg, Brauchweig, 1851 and 1858). J. Somody's translation into Hungarian was based on the tenth London edition (and was published by the Calvinist High School, Pápa, 1858, reprinted in Pest, 1861). F. Majocchi translated the book into Italian (Cairo, Codogno, 1860). The Russian edition (Cherenin & Ushakov, Moscow, 1863, 1868) was adapted by Alexander Palkhovsky from Vogt's 1858 translation.

=== Iconography of Vestiges ===
The first nine London editions and many translations of Vestiges included relatively few or no illustrations. The best-known image is the embryological-phylogenetic tree (see above) drawn after a diagram that appeared three years earlier in W. B. Carpenter's book, The Principles of General and Comparative Physiology (Churchill, London). Chambers acknowledged this fact only in the fifth edition of Vestiges. The diagram persisted in the first nine editions and appeared with minor changes in all but the Hungarian translation. The first two editions also contained a tree-like triangular diagram by which Chambers wanted to illustrate the Quinarian classification system of animals. Three mistakes in the text and the graph made this figure hard to understand and it was therefore completely ignored by historians of science. Since the Quinarian system had lost its popularity even before the first edition of Vestiges came out, Chambers decided to remove the material from the 3rd edition onwards. A third conceptual scheme from Vestiges is that of animal genealogy that first appeared in the 6th edition. It demonstrates how Chambers' views changed from the Quinarian system to a genealogical classification. Using fossil examples from the Silurian, the author suggested that different forms evolved independently along parallel routes. Chambers raised the possibility of drawing a Genealogical tree of Being, but never attempted to prepare one.

The book was often criticized for the lack of natural history illustrations which made the contents difficult to follow for a general reader. In fact, two translators had recognized the problem early on. Vogt included many figures of fossils in the German translation, whereas [Johannes Hubertus] van den Broek added two atlases as supplements to the Dutch version to illustrate fossils and recent animals. Eventually, Chambers realized the importance of illustrative material and asked Carpenter to select plant and animal images, mostly from his own book. One hundred and seven figures were then included in the tenth edition (1853), for example, the mammoth figure shown above. Actually, the number of different figures was only 100, because seven of them appeared twice in the book. The only translation in which the full set of figures also appears is the Hungarian one.

== See also ==
- Erasmus Darwin
- History of evolutionary thought
