= Edinburgh Phrenological Society =

Learned society for phrenology

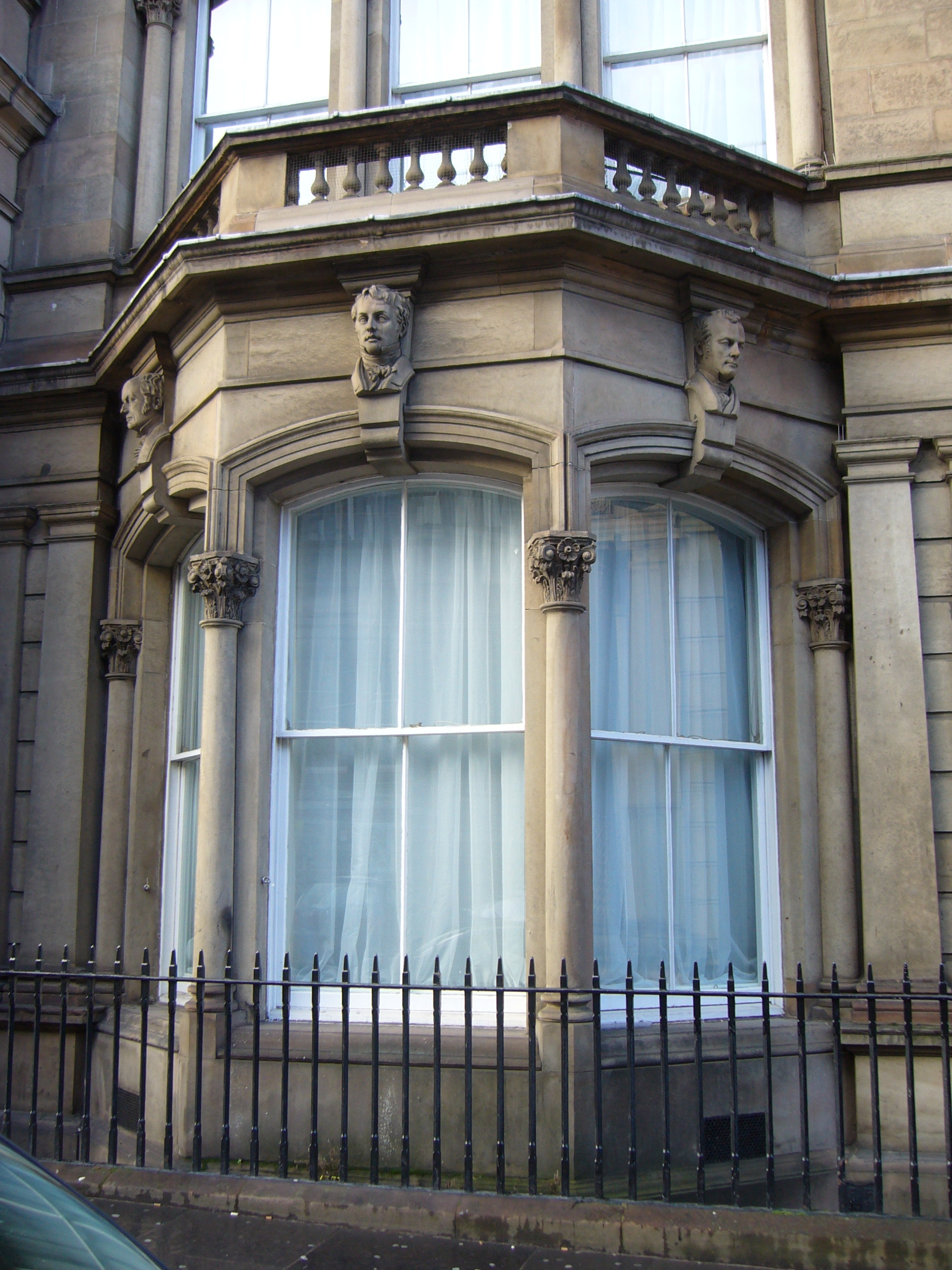
- The Society's former museum in Chambers Street, Edinburgh bears sculpted portraits of prominent figures in the field of phrenology.
- Formation: 1820
- Founders: George Combe and Andrew Combe
- Dissolved: 1870

The Edinburgh Phrenological Society was founded in 1820 by George Combe, an Edinburgh lawyer, with his physician brother Andrew Combe. The Edinburgh Society was the first and foremost phrenology grouping in Great Britain; more than forty phrenological societies followed in other parts of the British Isles. The Society's influence was greatest over its first two decades and declined in the 1840s; the final meeting was recorded in 1870.

The central concept of phrenology is that the brain is the organ of the mind and that human behaviour can be usefully understood in broadly neuropsychological (physically based) terms rather than with philosophical or religious concepts. Phrenologists discounted supernatural explanations and stressed the modularity of mind. The Edinburgh phrenologists also acted as midwives to evolutionary theory and inspired a renewed interest in psychiatric disorder and its moral treatment. Phrenology claimed to be scientific but is now regarded as a pseudoscience as its formal procedures did not conform to the usual standards of scientific method.

Edinburgh phrenologists included George and Andrew Combe; asylum doctor and reformer William A.F. Browne, father of James Crichton-Browne; Robert Chambers, author of the 1844 proto-Darwinian book Vestiges of the Natural History of Creation; William Ballantyne Hodgson, economist and pioneer of women's education; astronomer John Pringle Nichol; and botanist and evolutionary thinker Hewett Cottrell Watson. Charles Darwin, a medical student in Edinburgh in 1825–7, took part in phrenological discussions at the Plinian Society and returned to Edinburgh in 1838 when formulating his concepts concerning natural selection.

== Background ==
Phrenology emerged from the views of the medical doctor and scientific researcher Franz Joseph Gall in 18th-century Vienna. Gall suggested that facets of the mind corresponded to regions of the brain, and that it was possible to determine character traits by examining the shape of a person's skull. This "craniological" aspect was greatly extended by his one-time disciple, Johann Spurzheim, who coined the term phrenology and saw it as a means of social reform by improving the material conditions of human life.

In 1815, the Edinburgh Review published a hostile article by anatomist John Gordon, who called phrenology a "mixture of gross errors" and "extravagant absurdities". In response, Spurzheim travelled to Edinburgh to take part in public debates and to perform brain dissections in public. Although he was received politely by the scientific and medical community there, many were troubled by the philosophical materialism implicit in phrenology. George Combe, a lawyer who had previously been skeptical, became a convert to phrenology after listening to Spurzheim's commentary as he dissected a human brain.

== Founding and function ==
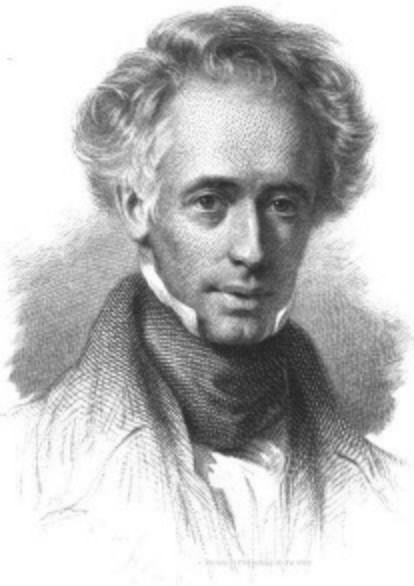
George Combe, founder of the society, was a lawyer who devoted his later life to advancing phrenology around the world.

"Mental dispositions are determined by the size and constitution of the brain... and these are transmitted by hereditary descent..." George Combe The Constitution of Man in relation to External Objects (1828)

The Edinburgh Phrenological Society was founded on 22 February 1820, by the Combe brothers with the support of the Evangelical minister David Welsh. The Society grew rapidly; in 1826, it had 120 members, an estimated one third of whom had a medical background. The Society acquired large numbers of phrenological artefacts, such as marked porcelain heads indicating the location of cerebral organs, and endocranial casts of individuals with unusual personalities. Their museum was located on Chambers Street.

Members published articles, gave lectures, and defended phrenology. Critics included philosopher Sir William Hamilton and the editor of the Edinburgh Review, Francis Jeffrey, Lord Jeffrey. The hostility of other critics, including Alexander Monro tertius, anatomy professor at the University of Edinburgh Medical School, actually added to the glamour of phrenological concepts. Some anti-religionists, including the anatomist Robert Knox and the evolutionist Robert Edmond Grant, while sympathetic to its materialist implications, rejected the unscientific nature of phrenology and did not embrace its speculative and reformist aspects.

In 1823, Andrew Combe addressed the Royal Medical Society in a debate, arguing that phrenology explained the intellectual and moral abilities of mankind. Both sides claimed victory after the lengthy debate, but the Medical Society refused to publish an account. This prompted the Edinburgh Phrenological Society to establish its own journal in 1824: The Phrenological Journal and Miscellany, later renamed Phrenological Journal and Magazine of Moral Science.

In the mid-1820s, a split emerged between the Christian phrenologists and Combe's closer associates. Matters came to a head when Combe and his supporters passed a motion banning the discussion of theology in the Society, effectively silencing their critics. In response, David Welsh and other evangelical members left the Society.

In December 1826, the atheistic phrenologist William A.F. Browne caused a sensation at the university's Plinian Society with an attack on the recently republished theories of Charles Bell concerning the expression of the human emotions. Bell believed that human anatomy was designed to allow the expression of the human moral self while Browne argued that there were no absolute distinctions between human and animal anatomy. Charles Darwin, then a 17-year-old student at the university, was there to listen. On 27 March 1827, Browne advanced phrenological theories concerning the human mind in terms of the Lamarckist evolution of the brain. This attracted the opposition of almost all members of the Plinian Society and, again, Darwin observed the ensuing outrage. In his private notebooks, including the M Notebook written ten years later, Darwin commented sympathetically on the views of the phrenologists.

George Combe published The Constitution of Man in 1828. After a slow start, it became an international bestseller in the 19th century, with around 350,000 copies sold. Almost a century later, psychiatrist Sir James Crichton-Browne said of the book: "The Constitution of Man on its first appearance was received in Edinburgh with an odium theologicum, analogous to that afterwards stirred up by the Vestiges of Creation and On The Origin of Species. It was denounced as an attack on faith and morals.... read today, it must be regarded as really rather more orthodox in its teaching than some of the lucubrations of the Dean of St Paul's and the Bishop of Durham".

Phrenologists from the Society applied their methods to the Burke and Hare murders in Edinburgh. Over the course of ten months in 1828, Burke and Hare murdered sixteen people and sold the bodies for dissection in the private anatomy schools. Burke was executed on 28 January 1829, while Hare turned King's evidence; Burke was publicly dissected by Professor Monro the next day, and the phrenologists were permitted to examine his skull. Face masks of both men – a death-mask for Burke and a life-mask for Hare – form part of the Edinburgh phrenology collection.

Scotswoman Agnes Sillars Hamilton made a living as a "practical phrenologist", travelling throughout Britain and Ireland. Her son, Archibald Sillars Hamilton left for Australia in 1854, developed a successful phrenology practice there, and published an account of Ned Kelly's skull.

Society co-founder and president Andrew Combe had two successful publications in the early 1830s: Observations on Mental Derangement in 1831 and Physiology applied to Health and Education in 1834. The latter, especially, sold well in Great Britain and the United States, with numerous editions and reprintings.

The Edinburgh Phrenological Society received a financial boost by the death of a wealthy supporter in 1832. William Ramsay Henderson left a large bequest to the Edinburgh Society to promote phrenology as it saw fit. The Henderson Trust enabled the society to publish an inexpensive edition of The Constitution of Man, which went on to become one of the best-selling books of the 19th century. However, despite the widespread interest in phrenology in the 1820s and 1830s, the Phrenological Journal always struggled to make a profit.

== Influences from the society ==
"One is tempted to believe phrenologists are right about habitual exercise of the mind altering form of head, & thus these qualities become hereditary." Charles Darwin (1838) The M Notebook.

W.A.F. Browne: In 1832–1834, Browne published a paper in The Phrenological Journal in three serialised episodes On Morbid Manifestations of the Organ of Language, as connected with Insanity, relating mental disorder to a disturbance in the neurological organization of language. Browne went on to a distinguished career as an asylum doctor and his internationally influential 1837 publication What Asylums Were, Are and Ought To Be was dedicated to Andrew Combe. In 1866, after his twenty years of leadership at The Crichton asylum in Dumfries, Browne was elected President of the Medico-Psychological Association. In his later years, Browne returned to relationships of psychosis, brain injury and language in his 1872 paper Impairment of Language, The Result of Cerebral Disease, published in the West Riding Lunatic Asylum Medical Reports, edited by his son James Crichton-Browne.

Robert Chambers: Although not formally admitted to the Society, Chambers occasionally acted as George Combe's publisher and became an enthusiast for phrenological thinking. In 1844, Chambers anonymously published Vestiges of the Natural History of Creation, written as he recovered from depression at his holiday home in St Andrews. Chambers' wife, Anne Kirkwood, transcribed the manuscript for the publishers (dictated by her husband) so that they would not recognise its origins. In a strange parallel, Prince Albert read it aloud to Queen Victoria in the Summer of 1845. It became an international bestseller and a powerful public influence, situated midway between Combe's The Constitution of Man (1828) and Darwin's On the Origin of Species in 1859.

Charles Darwin: Darwin attended the University of Edinburgh Medical School and, as an active member of the Plinian Society, observed the 1826-1827 controversies with phrenologist William A.F. Browne. In 1838, some eleven years after his hurried departure, Darwin revisited Edinburgh and his undergraduate haunts, recording his psychological speculations in the M Notebook and teasing out the details of his theory of natural selection. At this time, Darwin was preparing for marriage with his religiously minded cousin Emma Wedgwood, and was in some emotional turmoil: on 21 September, after his return to England, he recorded a vivid and disturbing dream in which he seemed to be involved in an execution at which the corpse came to life and joked about having died as a hero. Darwin made his "gigantic blunder" concerning the parallel roads of Glen Roy while on this Scottish trip, suggesting an element of mental distraction. He published On the Origin of Species some twenty years later, in 1859; the book was translated into many languages, and became a staple scientific text and a key fixture of modern scientific culture.

William Ballantyne Hodgson: Hodgson joined the phrenology movement as a student at Edinburgh University and later supported himself as a professional lecturer on literature, education, and phrenology. He became an educational reformer, a pioneering proponent of women's education and – in 1871 – the first Professor of Political Economy (and Mercantile Law) at Edinburgh University. In later life, Hodgson lived at Bonaly Tower outside Edinburgh, and was elected President of the Educational Institute of Scotland.

Thomas Laycock: Laycock was one of George Combe's "influential disciples". He was a pioneering neurophysiologist. In 1855, Laycock was appointed to the Chair of Medicine in Edinburgh University. In 1860, Laycock published his Mind and Brain, an extended essay on the neurological foundations of psychological life. Laycock was friendly with asylum reformer William A.F. Browne and was an important influence on Browne's son, Sir James Crichton-Browne.

John Pringle Nichol: Nichol was originally educated and licensed as a preacher, but the impact of phrenological thinking led him into education. He became a celebrated lecturer and Regius Professor of Astronomy in Glasgow University, and his 1837 book The Architecture of the Heavens was a classic of popular science. In the 1840s, Nichol became addicted to prescription opiates, and he recorded his successful hydropathic rehabilitation in his autobiographical correspondence Memorials from Ben Rhydding.

Hewett Cottrell Watson: In 1836, Watson published a paper in The Phrenological Journal entitled What Is The Use of the Double Brain? in which he speculated on the differential development of the two human cerebral hemispheres. This theme of cerebral asymmetry was picked up rather casually by the London society physician Sir Henry Holland in 1840, and then much more extensively by the eccentric Brighton medical practitioner Arthur Ladbroke Wigan in his 1844 treatise A New View of Insanity: On the Duality of Mind. It did not achieve scientific status until Paul Broca, encouraged by the French phrenologist/physician Jean-Baptiste Bouillaud, published his research into the speech centres of the brain in 1861. In 1868, Broca presented his findings at the Norwich meeting of the British Association for the Advancement of Science. In 1889, Henry Maudsley published a searching review of this topic entitled The Double Brain in the philosophical journal Mind. Like Robert Chambers, Watson later turned his energies to the question of the transmutation of species, and, having bought the Phrenological Journal with the proceeds of a large inheritance, appointed himself as its editor in 1837. In the 1850s, Watson conducted an extensive correspondence with Charles Darwin concerning the geographical distribution of British plant species, and Darwin made generous acknowledgement of Watson's scientific assistance in On The Origin of Species (second edition). Watson was unusual amongst phrenologists in explicitly disavowing phrenological ideas in later life.

== Decline ==
Interest in phrenology declined in Edinburgh in the 1840s. Some of the phrenologists' concerns drifted into the related fields of anthropometry, psychiatry and criminology, and also into degeneration theory as set out by Bénédict Morel, Arthur de Gobineau and Cesare Lombroso. In the 1870s, the eminent social psychologist Gustav Le Bon (1841–1931) invented a cephalometer which facilitated the measurement of cranial capacity and variation. In 1885, the German medical scientist Rudolf Virchow launched a large scale craniometric investigation of the supposed racial stereotypes with decisively negative results for the proponents of racial science. Worldwide, interest in phrenology remained high throughout the nineteenth century, with George Combe's The Constitution of Man being much in demand. Combe devoted his later years to international travel, lecturing on phrenology. He was preparing the ninth edition of The Constitution of Man when he died while receiving hydrotherapy treatment at Moor Park, Farnham.

The last recorded meeting of the Society took place in 1870. The Society's museum closed in 1886.

== Legacy of the Society ==
"You interest me very much, Mr Holmes. I had hardly expected so dolicocephalic a skull or such well marked supra-orbital development.... A cast of your skull, sir, until the original is available, would be an ornament to any anthropological museum..." – Arthur Conan Doyle (1902) The Hound of the Baskervilles.

Together with mesmerism, phrenology exerted an extraordinary influence on the Victorian literary imagination in the later 19th century, especially in the fin-de-siècle aesthetic, and comparable to the later cultural influences of spiritualism and psychoanalysis during the decline of mainstream religious belief. Examples of phrenology's literary legacy feature in the works of Sir Arthur Conan Doyle, George du Maurier, Bram Stoker, Robert Louis Stevenson and H. G. Wells.

On 29 February 1924, Sir James Crichton-Browne (the son of William A.F. Browne) delivered the Ramsay Henderson Bequest Lecture entitled The Story of the Brain in which he recorded a generous appreciation of the role of the Edinburgh phrenologists in the later development of neurology and neuropsychiatry. Crichton-Browne did not remark, however, on his father's having joined the Society a century earlier, almost to the day.

"While defending the fundamental principle that the brain is the organ of the mind.... the phrenologists were exposed to violent abuse, ridicule and vituperation.... it was, of course, their craniological conclusions, their dissection of the mind into a number of component faculties.... that was the main point of attack, and that, it must be allowed, readily leant itself to burlesque...." James Crichton-Browne (1924) The Story of The Brain.

The Henderson Trust was wound up in 2012. Many of the society's phrenological artefacts survive today, having passed to the University of Edinburgh's Anatomical Museum under the direction of Professor Matthew Kaufman, and some were put on display at the Scottish National Portrait Gallery.

The activities of the Edinburgh phrenologists have enjoyed an unusual afterlife in the history and sociology of scientific knowledge (science studies), as an example of a discarded cultural production.
