= Vestiges =

Vestiges may refer to:

- Vestiges of the Natural History of Creation (1844), by Robert Chambers
- Vestigiality, genetically determined structures or attributes that have lost some or all of their ancestral function
