= The Constitution of Man =

- Author: George Combe
- Language: English
- Publication date: 1828

The Constitution of Man (or more completely, The Constitution of Man Considered in Relation to External Objects) first published in 1828 is a work by George Combe, who is credited with popularizing the pseudoscience of Phrenology. Combe argues that the human mind is best understood through phrenology, and that the relative size of the various regions of the brain defined by phrenology determines a person's behavior and potential interactions with the external world. In The Constitution of Man, Combe uses phrenology to create a practical science of morality, proposing that conforming to natural laws leads to happiness based on the phrenological understanding of human nature. The book was an international bestseller, selling at least 100,000 copies in Britain alone and over 300,000 copies worldwide by 1855, largely due to the publication of the 'people's edition,' making it one of the best-sellers of the nineteenth century.

== Summary/Content ==
=== Preface ===
Combe prefaces his work by stating, "no author has hitherto attempted to point out, in a combined and systematic form, the relations between [the laws of nature] and the constitution of Man; which must, nevertheless, be done...The great object of the following Essay is to exhibit these relations, with a view to the improvement of education, and the regulation of individual conduct." He explains his use of phrenology in the work by saying, "Phrenology appears to me to be the clearest, most complete, and best supported system of Human Nature." Combe aims to use phrenology to develop a concept of the relationship between human nature and the external world.

=== Chapter I: On Natural Laws ===
In Chapter I, Combe defines the Natural Laws, categorizes them, and identifies principles concerning the Natural Laws. For Combe, "A law...denotes a rule of action; its existence indicates an established and constant mode, or process, according to which phenomena take place." Natural Laws refer to "the rules of action impressed on objects and beings by their natural constitution" Combe presents the relationship between God, Nature, and the Natural Laws: "If, then, the reader keep in view that God is the creator; that Nature, in the general sense, means the world which He has made; and, in a more limited sense, the particular constitution which he has bestowed on any special object...and that a Law of Nature means the established mode in which that constitution acts, and the obligation thereby imposed on intelligent beings to attend to it, he will be in no danger of misunderstanding my meaning"

Combe identifies three categories for the Natural Laws: Physical, Organic, and Intelligent. The Physical Laws "embrace all the phenomena of mere matter", the Organic Laws [indicate] that "every phenomenon connected with the production, health, growth, decay, and death of vegetables and animals, takes place with undeviating regularity". Combe defines Intelligent beings as "all animals that have a distinct consciousness", and the Intelligent Laws concern the makeup of the mental capacities of Intelligent beings. He then identifies four principles concerning the Natural Laws: 1) the Laws are independent 2) obeying the Laws brings rewards and disobedience brings punishment 3) the Laws are fixed and universal, and 4) the laws are harmonious with the constitution of man.

At the end of this chapter Combe once again presents the purpose of the work: "My object, I repeat, is to investigate the natural constitution of the human body and mind, their relations to external objects and beings in this world, and the courses of action that...appear to be beneficial or hurtful."

=== Chapter II: Of the Constitution of Man, and its Relations to External Objects ===
In the first section, Combe discusses "Man Considered as a Physical Being," and asserts that man has been created by God to both understand and obey the laws of nature in both mental and physical capacities.

In section two, "Man Considered as an Organised Being," Combe argues that man is an organized being, subject to growth, decay, and eating food to survive; man must exercise these systems in some form of work if they are to enjoy pleasure.

In section three, "Man Considered as an Animal–Moral–and Intellectual Being," Combe introduces phrenology as the best way to understand the "animal, moral, and intellectual powers" of man, and proceeds to list the 'Human Faculties' according to phrenology:

- Order I. Feelings
  - Genus I. Propensities (Amativeness, Philoprogrenitiveness, Concentrativeness, Adhesiveness, Comrativeness, Destructiveness, Constructiveness, Acquisitiveness, Secretiveness)
  - Genus II. Sentiments
    - Common to Man with Lower Animals: Self-Esteem, Love of Approbation, Cautiousness, Benevolence
    - Proper to Man: Veneration, Hope, Ideality, Wonder, Consciousness, Firmness
- Order II. Intellectual Faculties
  - Genus I. External Senses (Touch, Taste, Hearing, Smell, Light)
  - Genus II. Intellectual Faculties–which perceive existence (Individuality, Form, Size, Weight, Colouring)
  - Genus III. Intellectual Faculties –which perceive the relations of external objects (Locality, Order, Time, Number, Tune, Language)
  - Genus IV. Reflecting Faculties (Comparison, Causality, Wit, Imitation)

In Section four, "The Faculties of Man Compared With Each Other; or the Supremacy of the Moral Sentiments and Intellect," Combe goes on to argue that the moral sentiments are superior to those that men share with animals, and that the faculties "are right only when directed by enlightened intellect and moral sentiment...they must be illuminated by knowledge of science and of moral and religious duty," or else the result is evil. A delicate balance of the expression of the faculties is required for man's happiness.

In Section five, "The Faculties of Man Compared with External Objects," Combe identifies specific faculties and their effects on the eternal world. For example, with Philoprogenitiveness, the love of offspring, results in producing children.

Section six, "On the Sources of Human Happiness, and the Conditions Requisite for Maintaining it," Combe argues that man is born with no knowledge of the Natural Laws and must gain knowledge throughout life. Man must satisfy all of their faculties in harmony if one wishes to attain happiness. Combe believes that the 'Creator' has equipped man with the capacity to live an enjoyable life.

In Section seven, "Application of the Natural Laws to the Practical Arrangements," Combe expands upon his previous argument that Moral Sentiments and Intellect are the superior, and adds that the Intellect is nothing without emotion. Combe concludes the chapter by asserting once again that phrenology offers revelations into the nature of man, and can be used to support his argument that happiness comes with moral and intellectual growth.

=== Chapter III: To What Extent are the Miseries of Mankind Referable to Infringements of the Laws of Nature ===
In Section one "Calamities Arising from Infringements of the Physical Laws," Combe lists numerous organic and physical laws, and illustrates how their obedience results in happiness, and their disobedience in punishment. If one obeys the physical laws of nature, their likelihood of suffering is decreased.

In Section two, "On the Evils that Befall Mankind, from Infringement of the Organic Laws," Combe begins by reiterating his view that obedience to the moral laws and increasing ones knowledge through education beings happiness and livelihood. Education allows man to realize the relationship between the obedience of the Natural Laws and happiness. Combe also emphasizes that theoretical and practical knowledge should be combined through the integration of scientific and religious teachings.

Later in section two, Combe begins his discussion of phrenology and the inheritance of human traits. He states, "Mental talents and dispositions are determined by the size and constitution of the brain. The brain is a portion of our organized system, and as such, is subject to the organic laws, by one of which its qualities are transmitted by hereditary descent." Combe extends this argument to nations of people: "The differences of national character are equally conspicuous as those of national brains, and it is surprising how permanently both endure" citing the perceived contemporary differences in the "Hindoo, Chinese, New Hollander, Negro, and Charib" skulls. He then investigates the contemporary notions of trait inheritance in 'lower animals' like sheep and dogs and claims that the inheritance patterns observed in animals, children acquiring habits from the parent, resembles that of humans. Combe presents a hierarchy of human minds by human groups: "Europeans...possess a favourable development of the moral and intellectual organs," and Hindoos, and Native American "brains are inferior". He goes on to say that the child with two European parents has superior mental qualities to that of a child with one European parent and one non-European parent, and that the child with one European parent has superior mental qualities to the child with no European parents On the basis that intellectual and moral habits are inherited by offspring from parents, it is even more important to preserve and develop these faculties so that they may be ideal in offspring. Combe also proposes that the heredity of the capacities is limited to good and not evil, and despite the stratification of the races, each has the potential for improvement through generations up to an ideal limit of capacity.

In Section three "Calamities Arising from Infringement of the Moral Law," and section four "Moral Advantages of Punishment," Combe argues that the development of human moral and intellectual capacities results in individual, religious, moral, and societal improvement.

=== Chapter IV: On the Combined Operation of the Natural Laws ===
In this chapter, Combe presents historical examples of the interactions of the natural laws, and how obedience to one does not necessarily imply obedience to the rest, and how punishment and reward for those laws disobeyed and obeyed, respectively, occurs in the lives of men.

=== Conclusion ===
Combe concludes by asserting that Phrenology provides an unprecedented science of the Mind. With Phrenology, one can understand the constitution of man, and this is essential for individual and societal happiness and improvement. By understanding the mind and relationship of the mind to the external world, Combe argues that politics, legislation, education, morals, religion, and pursuits of man have the potential to improve, if only the principles of Phrenology and the obedience of the natural laws are true, taught, and incorporated into the 'public mind.'

== Reception ==
Initially, The Constitution of Man was indifferently received, selling in small numbers over a period of six years or so. Historian James A. Secord reports, "In Britain Constitution was initially a flop. Published in an edition of 1,500 the book sold slowly until 1835, about 100 copies a year and received almost no reviews. In 1832, two revised, expanded, and subsidized 'Henderson' editions in the same format...sold quickly" The Henderson edition was subsidized by William Ramsay Henderson with a donation of five-thousand pounds for the 'advancement of Phrenology.' In 1836, the Chambers edition sold at one fifth of the regular price sold "85,000 copies by 1850 making Constitution 'among the best-selling books of the nineteenth century.'

In Combe's lifetime, there were five published editions of The Constitution, with 100,000 copies sold in the UK and 200,000 copies in the United States. With the financial help of the Henderson Bequest, an affordable edition of The Constitution was published, selling 59,00 copies in a 3 year period. There are at least nine unique published editions.

The book influenced William Ballantyne Hodgson.

=== Controversy ===
Though in The Constitution Combe states: "I have endeavoured to avoid all religious controversy," numerous contemporaries accused Combe of atheism, materialism, and determinism. Combe took particular care not to offend Christian beliefs, but many critics read The Constitution as anti-Christian. Critics feared that Combe threatened the role of God by championing the laws of nature, and Combe was accused of attempting to sway followers of the Christian faith. Historian Anthony Walsh comments, "As a work which denied to a certain extent Divine intervention in worldly happenings, [The Constitution] was condemned as an expression of infidelity." Additionally, Combe's claim that the phrenological understanding of the mind and his own philosophy were valuable to guiding religious education was met with criticism, as they believed Combe prioritized his understanding of the Natural Laws and the phrenological understanding of the mind over the Bible. Historian James Secord notes, "Constitution maintained that understanding the laws of nature must be a preliminary to all religious instruction, so that the Bible needed to be interpreted in light of the Constitution rather than the other way around."

Numerous attacks made on The Constitution were met with responses in the Journal of the Edinburgh Phrenological Society of which Combe was a founder and member. In later editions Combe attempted to reconcile Phrenology with Christianity in response to critics, and Combe tried attempted to confirm the existence of Christianity's compatibility with his outlined Natural Laws. Editions published after 1835 were notably different from the original version of The Constitution with additional sections and chapters added to address the religious controversy that surrounded Combe's book.
