= George Combe =

Scottish lawyer and phrenologist (1788–1858)

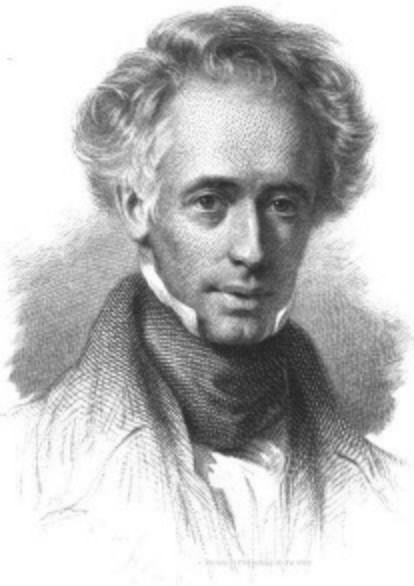
- George Combe, 1836 by Daniel Macnee
- Born: 21 October 1788; Edinburgh, Scotland, Kingdom of Great Britain
- Died: 14 August 1858 (aged 69); Moor Park, Farnham, Surrey, England, United Kingdom
- Education: University of Edinburgh
- Known for: phrenology
- Scientific career
- Fields: phrenology writer

George Combe (21 October 1788 – 14 August 1858) was a Scottish lawyer and a spokesman of the phrenological movement for over 20 years. He founded the Edinburgh Phrenological Society in 1820 and wrote The Constitution of Man (1828). After marriage in 1833, Combe devoted his later years to promoting phrenology internationally.

== Early life ==
George Combe was born at Livingston's Yards, Edinburgh, the son of Marion (née Newton, died 1819) and George Combe, a prosperous brewer in the city. His younger brother was the physician Andrew Combe. After attending the High School of Edinburgh, he studied law at the University of Edinburgh, entered a lawyer's office in 1804, and in 1812 began a solicitor's practice at 11 Bank Street.

In 1820 Combe moved his office to Mylnes Court on the Royal Mile and moved house to 8 Hermitage Place in Stockbridge. In 1825 he moved with Andrew to 2 Brown Square off the Grassmarket. The Combe brothers lived together in a large dwelling at 25 Northumberland Street in the New Town from 1829.

== Phrenological Society ==
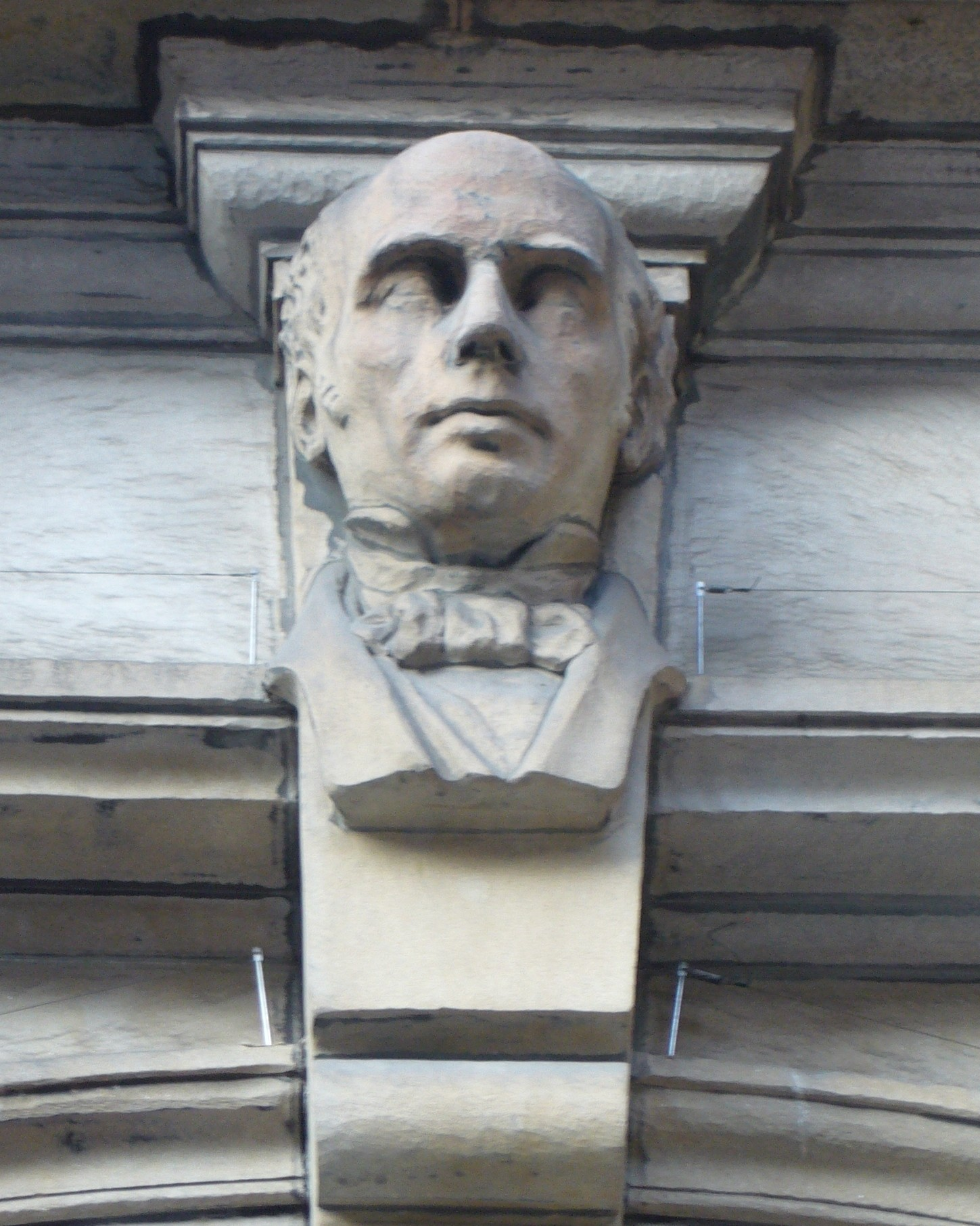
Sculpted portrait of Combe on the Museum of the Edinburgh Phrenological Society building in Edinburgh

In 1815, the Edinburgh Review contained an article on the system of "craniology" devised by Franz Joseph Gall and Johann Gaspar Spurzheim, denouncing it as "a piece of thorough quackery from beginning to end". When Spurzheim came to Edinburgh in 1816, Combe was invited to a friend's house, where he watched Spurzheim dissect a human brain. Impressed by the demonstration, he attended a second series of Spurzheim's lectures. On investigating the subject for himself, he became satisfied that the fundamental principles of phrenology were true: "that the brain is the organ of mind; that the brain is an aggregate of several parts, each subserving a distinct mental faculty; and that the size of the cerebral organ is, caeteris paribus, an index of power or energy of function."

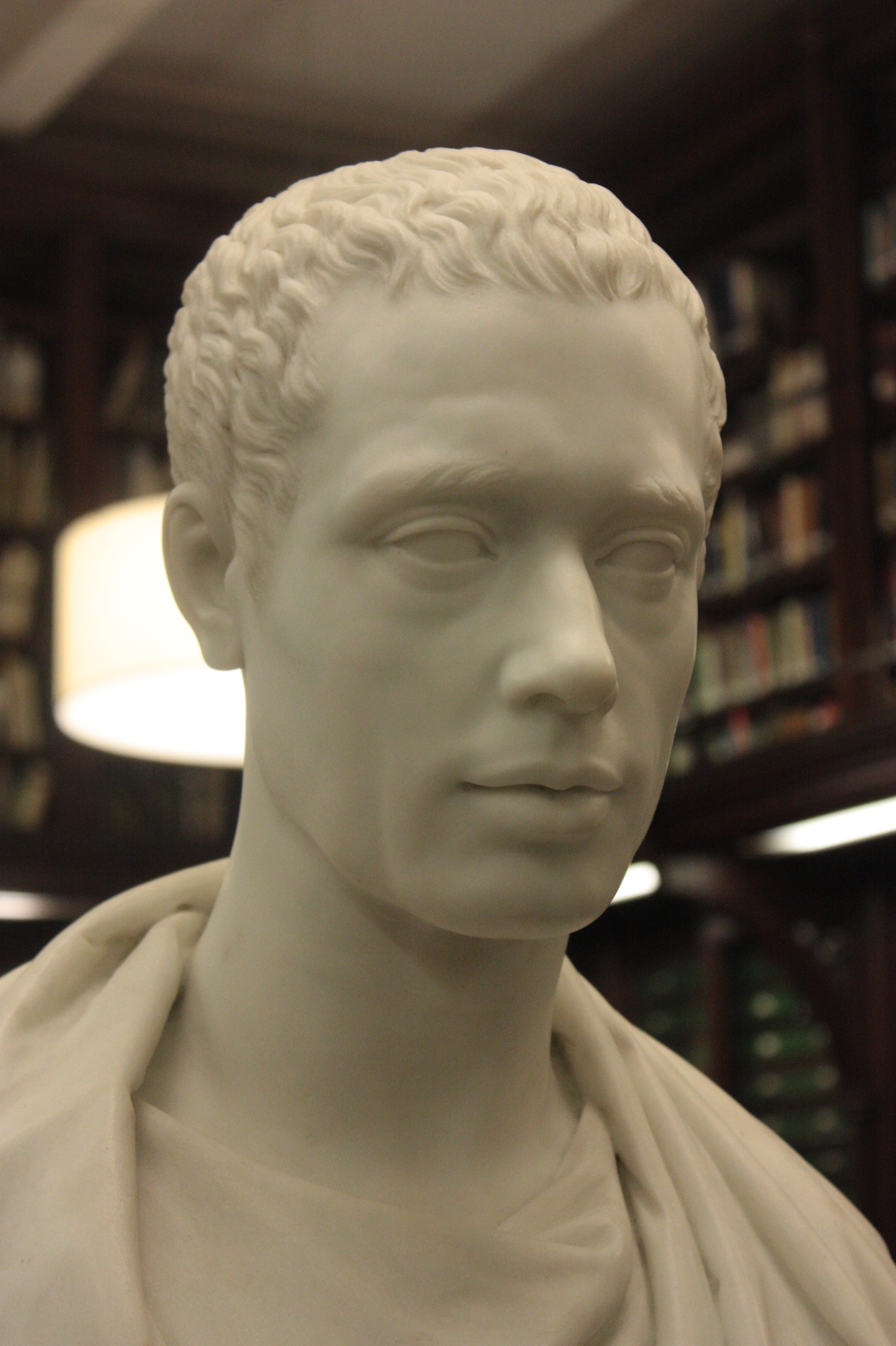
Combe as sculpted by Lawrence Macdonald around 1825

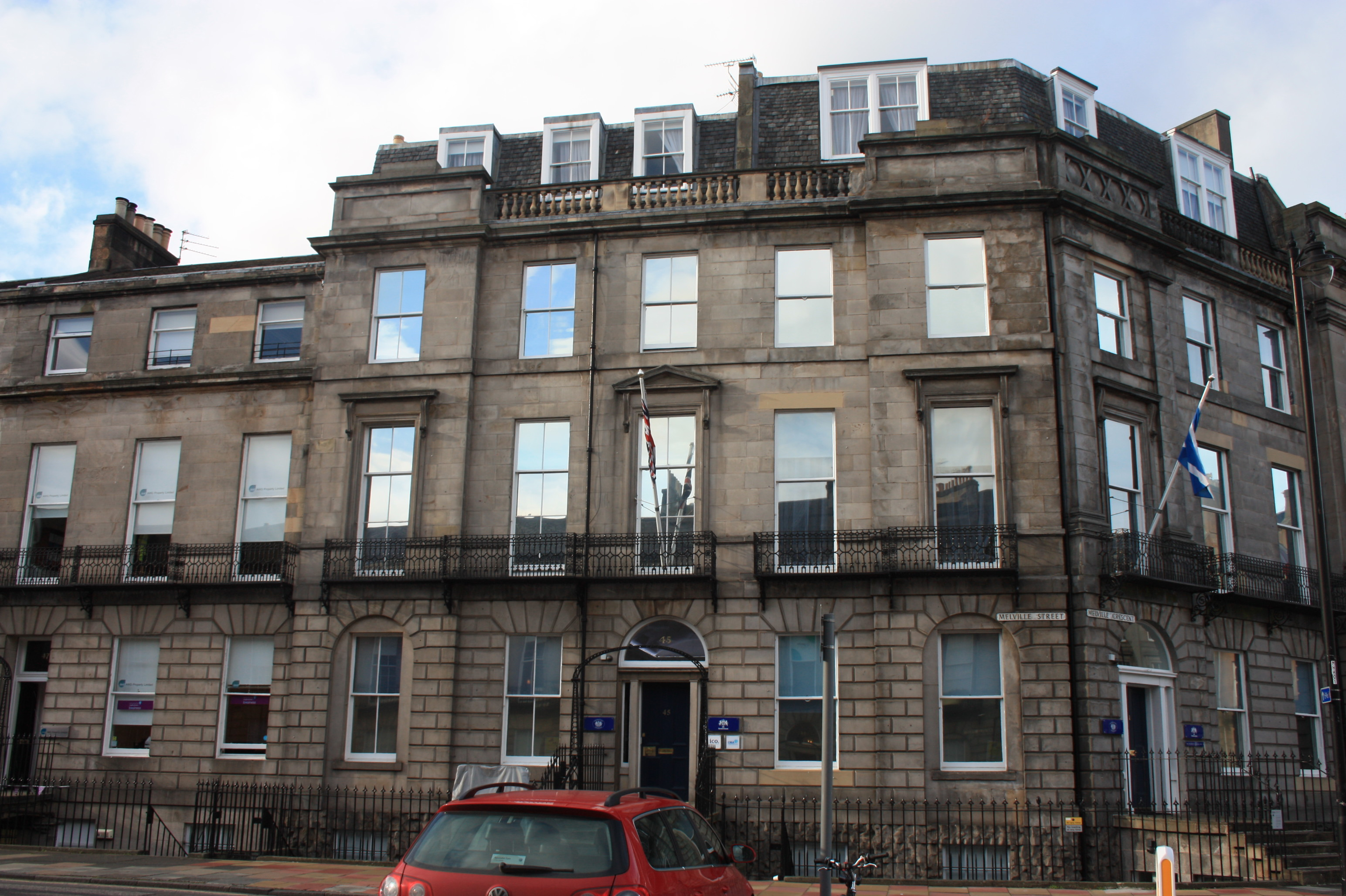
45 Melville Street, Edinburgh

His first essay on phrenology was published in Scots Magazine in 1817, and were followed by a series of papers Literary and Statistical Magazine. The writings were collected and published in 1819 in book form as Essays on Phrenology and, in later editions, as A System of Phrenology. In 1820, Combe helped to found the Phrenological Society of Edinburgh, which in 1823 established a Phrenological Journal. His lectures and writings also drew attention to phrenology in Europe and the United States.

== Debate with Hamilton ==
Combe began to lecture at Edinburgh in 1822. He published a Manual, Elements of Phrenology, in June 1824. He took private tuition in elocution; contemporaries described him as clever and opinionated. Combe's discussions had an air of confidentiality and theatrical urgency. Converts came in, societies sprang up and controversies began.

A second edition of Elements, 1825, was attacked by Francis Jeffrey in the Edinburgh Review of September 1825. Combe replied in a pamphlet and the journal. The phrenologists were attacked again in 1826 and 1827 by Sir William Hamilton in addresses to the Royal Society of Edinburgh. The sharp controversy included challenges to public disputes and mutual charges of misrepresentation, in which Spurzheim took part. The correspondence appeared in the fourth and fifth volumes of the Phrenological Journal.

== Social interests: schools, prisons and asylums ==
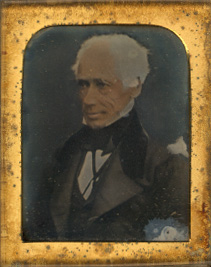
George Combe, a daguerreotype

In 1836, Combe stood for the chair of Logic at the University of Edinburgh against two other candidates: Sir William Hamilton and Isaac Taylor. Hamilton won by 18 votes against 14 for Taylor. In 1838 Combe visited the United States to study the treatment of criminals there. He initiated a programme of public education in chemistry, physiology, history and moral philosophy.

Combe sought to improve public education through a national, non-sectarian system. He helped to set up a school in Edinburgh run on the principles of William Ellis, and did some teaching there in phrenology and physiology. It was prompted by the London Birkbeck School, which had opened on 17 July 1848. Combe was strongly behind the view that the state should be involved in the education system. In this he was backed by William Jolly, an inspector of schools, and noted by Frank Pierrepont Graves.

Combe was much concerned about prison reform. He and William A. F. Browne opened a debate on introducing humane treatment of psychiatric patients in publicly funded asylums.

== Later life ==
John Ramsay L'Amy, son of James L'Amy, trained under Combe at his offices at 25 Northumberland Street in Edinburgh's New Town.

In 1842, Combe gave a course of 22 lectures on phrenology at the Ruprecht Karl University of Heidelberg and travelled about Europe enquiring into management of schools, prisons and asylums.

On retiring, Combe took a substantial terraced townhouse, 45 Melville Street, in Edinburgh's West End. He was revising the 9th edition of the Constitution of Man when he died at Moor Park, Farnham in August 1858. He lies under a simple headstone in the Dean Cemetery, Edinburgh, against the north wall of the original section. His wife Cecilia Siddons is buried with him.

In 2019, Combe's skull was discovered by curators at the Anatomical Museum in the University of Edinburgh.

== Works ==
In 1817, Combe's first essay on phrenology in The Scots Magazine was followed by a series of papers on the subject in the Literary and Statistical Magazine. These appeared in book form in 1819 as Essays on Phrenology, entitled A System of Phrenology in later editions.

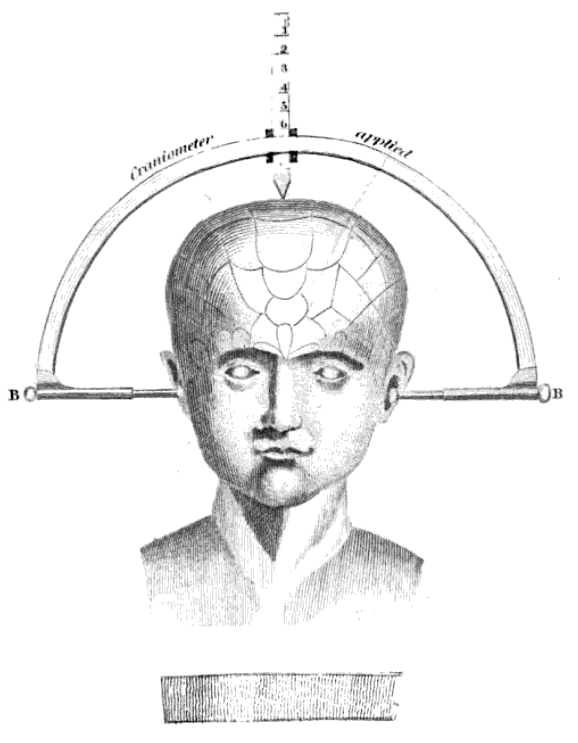
Engraving of craniometer from Elements of phrenology (1835), by George Combe

Combe's most popular work, The Constitution of Man, appeared in 1828 but was widely denounced as materialist and atheist. He argued in it: "Mental qualities are determined by the size, form and constitution of the brain; and these are transmitted by hereditary descent."

Combe was one of an active Edinburgh scene of people thinking about the nature of heredity and its possible malleability, as Lamarck proposed. Combe himself was no Lamarckian, but in the decades before Darwin's Origin of Species was published, the Constitution was probably the single most important vehicle for disseminating naturalistic progressivism in the English-speaking world.

Combe's 1838 Answers to the Objections Urged Against Phrenology was followed in 1840 by Moral Philosophy and in 1841 by Notes on the United States of North America. Phrenology Applied to Painting and Sculpture ensued in 1855. The culmination of Combe's autobiographical philosophy appeared in "On the Relation between Science and Religion", first publicly issued in 1857. Combe moved into the economic arena with a pamphlet on The Currency Question (1858). A fuller phrenological approach to political economy was set out later by William Ballantyne Hodgson.

== Family ==
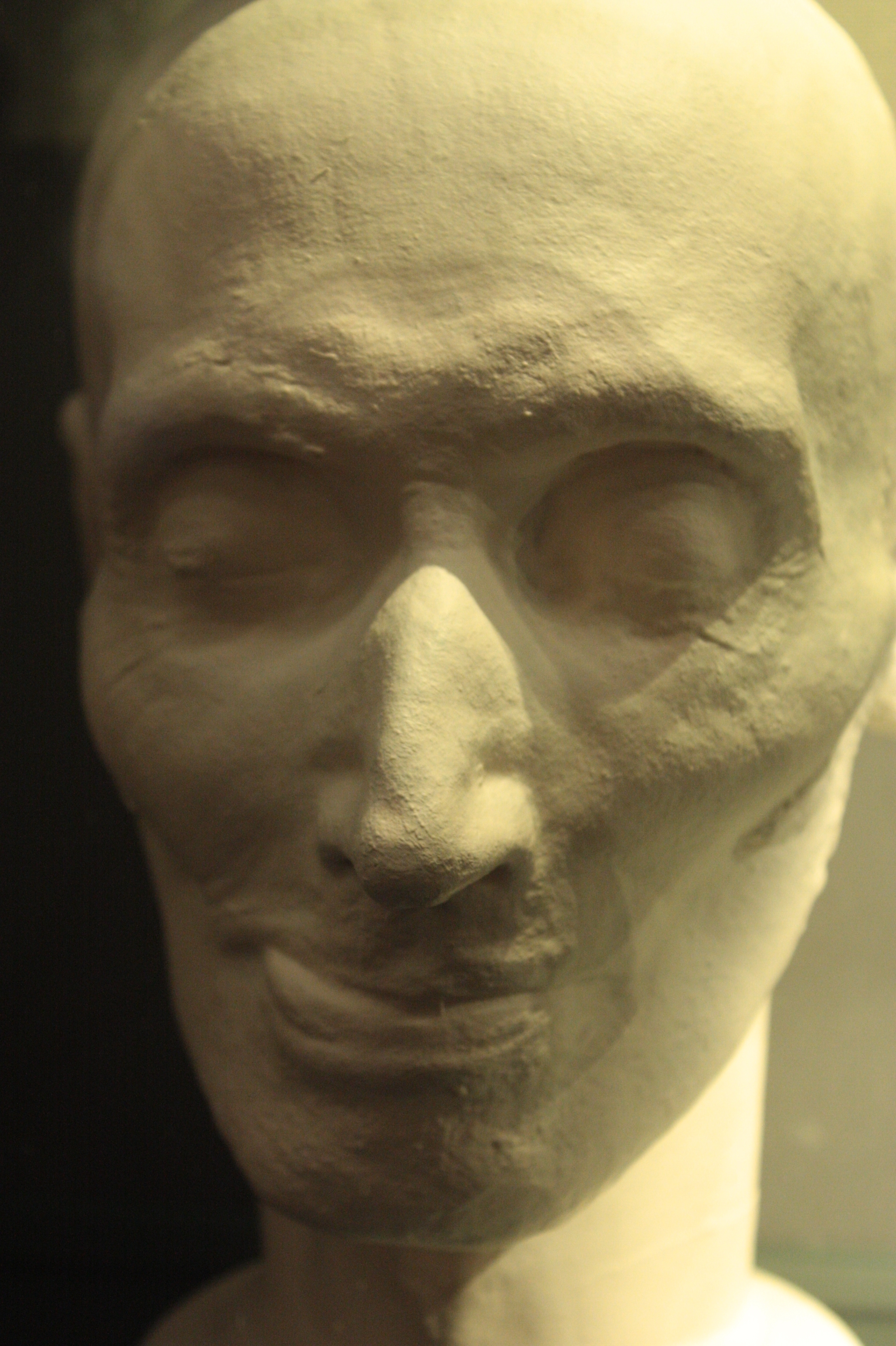
Death mask of George Combe, 1858

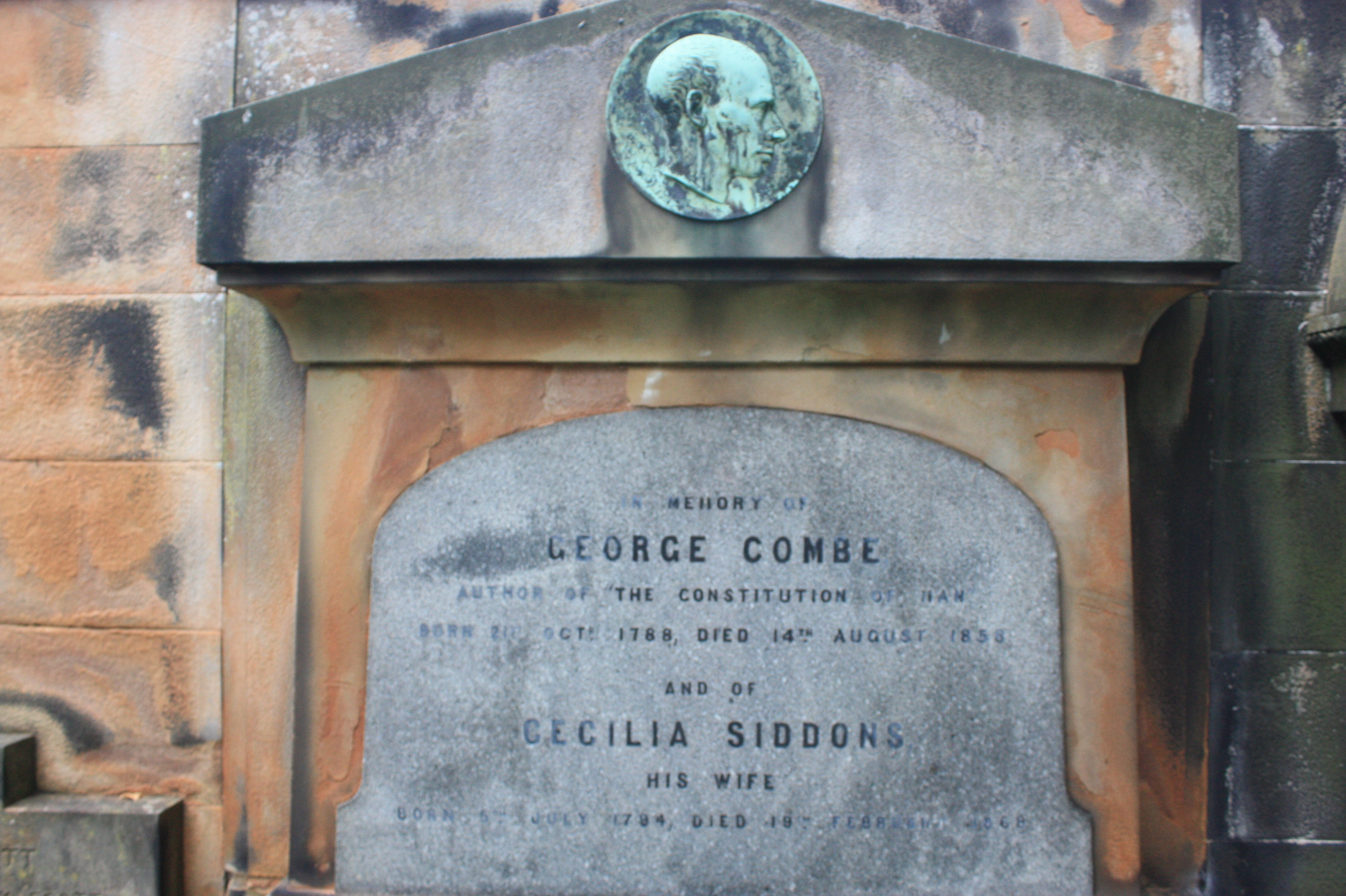
Tomb of George Combe, Dean Cemetery

In 1833, Combe married Cecilia Siddons, daughter of the actress Sarah Siddons and sister of Henry Siddons, author of Practical Illustrations of Rhetorical Gesture and Action (1807). She brought him a fortune and a happy, though childless marriage, preceded by a phrenological check for compatibility. A few years later, he retired from the law in comfortable circumstances.

== Bibliography ==
- George Combe (1828), The Constitution of Man Considered in Relation to External Objects. J. Anderson jun. (reissued by Cambridge University Press, 2009; ISBN 978-1-108-00413-8)
- George Combe (1830), A System of Phrenology Edinburgh: J Anderson. Full Text Available at archive.org
- George Combe (1857), On the Relation Between Science and Religion. Maclachlan and Stewart (reissued by Cambridge University Press, 2009; ISBN 978-1-108-00451-0)
- Wright, Peter (August 2005). "George Combe—phrenologist, philosopher, psychologist (1788–1858)". Cortex. 41 (4): 447–451. doi:10.1016/s0010-9452(08)70185-0. PMID 16042021. S2CID 4486798.
- Kaufman, M. H. (October 1995). "Circumstances surrounding the examination of the skull and brain of George Combe (1788–1858) advocate of phrenology". Proceedings of the Royal College of Physicians of Edinburgh. 25 (4): 663–674. PMID 11608956.
- Sait, J. E. (1976). "The Combe collection in the National Library of Scotland". The Bibliotheck. 8 (1–2): 53–54. PMID 11634646.
- De Giustino, D (1972). "Reforming the commonwealth of thieves: British phrenologists and Australia". Victorian Studies. 15: 439–61. PMID 11678098.
- Walsh, A. A. (July 1971). "George Combe: a portrait of a heretofore generally unknown behaviorist". Journal of the History of the Behavioral Sciences. 7 (3): 269–278. doi:10.1002/1520-6696(197107)7:3<269::AID-JHBS2300070305>3.0.CO;2-6. PMID 11609418.

== Notes ==
Attribution:

- This article incorporates text from a publication now in the public domain: Stephen, Leslie (1887). "Combe, George". In Stephen, Leslie (ed.). Dictionary of National Biography. Vol. 11. London: Smith, Elder & Co. pp. 427–429.
