= James A. Secord =

American historian of science (born 1953)

James (Jim) Andrew Secord (born 18 March 1953) is an American-born historian of science. He was a professor of history and philosophy of science within the Department of History and Philosophy of Science at the University of Cambridge, and a fellow of Christ's College. He was also the director (from 2006 until completed in 2023) of the project to publish the complete Correspondence of Charles Darwin. Secord is especially well known for Victorian Sensation, his award-winning study of the reception of the anonymous Vestiges of the Natural History of Creation, a pioneering evolutionary book first published in 1844. In 2020 he was elected as a Fellow of the British Academy.

== Education and career ==
Secord was born in Madison, Wisconsin. After attending Pomona College, he received a Fulbright–Hays grant to study in the United Kingdom. He completed his PhD in the history of science at Princeton University (1976–81). His dissertation was entitled "Cambria/Siluria: The Anatomy of a Victorian Geological Debate" and his adviser was Charles Coulston Gillispie. After postdoctoral fellowships at University College London and at Churchill College in the University of Cambridge, he taught history of science at Imperial College London from 1985 to 1992. In 1992 he began teaching in Cambridge.

In 2012 he held the Sandars Readership in Bibliography at Cambridge University.

== Publications ==
=== Books ===
Secord's first book, based upon his PhD research, was Controversy in Victorian Geology: The Cambrian-Silurian Dispute (Princeton: Princeton University Press, 1986). He followed it with Victorian Sensation: The Extraordinary Publication, Reception, and Secret Authorship of Vestiges of the Natural History of Creation (Chicago: University of Chicago Press, 2000), which was awarded the 2002 Pfizer Award by the History of Science Society for best book in history of science in English in the prior three years. His most recent book was Visions of Science: Books and Readers at the Dawn of the Victorian Age (Oxford: Oxford University Press, 2014; Chicago: University of Chicago Press, 2014). He has also edited numerous volumes and contributed to many more.

=== Articles and book chapters ===
- ‘Nature's Fancy: Charles Darwin and the Breeding of Pigeons.’ Isis 72 (1981): 162–186. doi:10.1086/352717
- ‘King of Siluria: Roderick Murchison and the Imperial Theme in Nineteenth Century British Geology.’ Victorian Studies, 25 (1982): 413–442.
- ‘John W. Salter: The Rise and Fall of a Victorian Palaeontological Career.’ In From Linnaeus to Darwin: Commentaries on the History of Biology and Geology, ed. by A. Wheeler and J. Price, 61–75. London: Society for the History of Natural History, 1985.
- ‘Newton in the Nursery: Tom Telescope and the Philosophy of Tops and Balls, 1761–1838.’ History of Science 23 (1985): 127–151.
- ‘Natural History in Depth.’ Social Studies of Science 15 (1985): 181–200. doi:10.1177/030631285015001010
- ‘Darwin and the Breeders: A Social History.’ In The Darwinian Heritage, ed. by D. Kohn, 519–542. Princeton: Princeton University Press, 1985.
- ‘The Geological Survey of Great Britain as a Research School, 1839–1855.’ History of Science 24 (1986): 223–275. doi:10.1177/007327538602400301
- ‘Pasteur and the Process of Discovery: The Case of Optical Isomerism.’ Isis 79 (1988): 6–36 (with G. L. Geison). doi:10.1086/354632
- ‘Behind the Veil: Robert Chambers and Vestiges.’ In History, Humanity and Evolution, ed. by J. R. Moore, 165–194. Cambridge: Cambridge University Press, 1989.
- ‘Extraordinary Experiment: Electricity and the Creation of Life in Victorian England.’ In The Uses of Experiment, ed. by D. Gooding, T. Pinch, and S. Schaffer, 337–383. Cambridge: Cambridge University Press, 1989.
- ‘The Curious Case of Acarus crossii.’ Nature 345 (1990): 471–472. doi:10.1038/345471a0 (See Andrew Crosse.)
- ‘Edinburgh Lamarckians: Robert Jameson and Robert E. Grant.’ Journal of the History of Biology 24 (1991), 1–18.
- ‘The Discovery of a Vocation: Darwin’s Early Geology.’ British Journal for the History of Science 24 (1991), 133–157. doi:10.1017/S0007087400027059
- ‘Scientific London.’ In London: World City 1800–1840, ed. by C. Fox, 129–142. New Haven: Yale University Press, 1992 (with I. Morus and S. J. Schaffer).
- ‘Clarke, Alexander Ross.’ In The Dictionary of National Biography: Missing Persons, ed. by C. S. Nicholls, 135–136. Oxford: Oxford University Press, 1993.
- ‘Introduction.’ In R. Chambers, Vestiges of the Natural History of Creation and other Evolutionary Writings, vii–xlv. Chicago: University of Chicago Press, 1994.
- ‘The Counter-Revolution in Science.’ Yorkshire Philosophical Society Annual Report for the Year 1995, 49–51. York: 1996.
- ‘The Crisis of Nature.’ In Cultures of Natural History, ed. by N. Jardine, J. Secord and E. Spary, 447–459, 493–494. Cambridge: Cambridge University Press, 1996.
- ‘Introduction.’ In C. Lyell, Principles of Geology, ix–xliii. London: Penguin Books, 1997.
- ‘Une science à la mode.’ Les Cahiers de Science et Vie 49 (1999): 14–23.
- ‘Geology.’ In An Oxford Companion to the Romantic Age: British Culture 1776–1832, ed. by I. McCalman, 519–521. Oxford: Oxford University Press, 1999.
- ‘Robert Chambers.’ In Cambridge Bibliography of English Literature. 3d ed., vol. 4, ed. by J. Shattock, cols. 2528–2531. Cambridge: Cambridge University Press, 2000.
- ‘Progress in Print.’ In Books and the Sciences in History, ed. by M. Frasca-Spada and N. Jardine, 369–389. Cambridge: Cambridge University Press, 2000.
- ‘Vestigial Sensations: Author’s Reply.’ In review symposium on Victorian Sensation, Metascience 11 (2002), 28–33.
- ‘Quick and Magical Shaper of Science [J. H. Pepper].’ Science 297 (2002), 1648–1649.
- 'Introduction.' In reprint of J. H. Pepper, The Boy's Playbook of Science (1860), v–x. Bristol: Edition Synapse/ Thoemmes Press, 2003.
- 'Introduction.' In reprint of [S. Clark], Peter Parley's Wonders of the Earth, Sea, and Sky (1837), v–x. Bristol: Edition Synapse/ Thoemmes Press, 2003.
- ‘Author’s Response.’ In review symposium on Victorian Sensation, Journal of Victorian Culture 8 (2003), 142–150.
- ‘From Miller to the Millennium.’ In Celebrating the Life and Times of Hugh Miller, ed. by L. Borley, 328–337. Cromarty, Scotland: Cromarty Arts Trust, 2003.
- ‘Monsters at the Crystal Palace.’ In Models: The Third Dimension of Science, ed. by S. de Chadarevian and N. Hopwood, 138–169. Stanford: Stanford University Press, 2004.
- ‘Andrew Crosse,’ ‘Henry De la Beche,’ ‘David Page,’ ‘John William Salter,’ ‘Adam Sedgwick,’ ‘Harry Govier Seeley,’ ‘Daniel Sharpe,’ ‘Charles Southwell,’ ‘William Bernhardt Tegetmeier.’ In Oxford Dictionary of National Biography, ed. by H. C. G. Matthew and B. Harrison. Oxford: Oxford University Press, 2004.
- ‘Knowledge in Transit.’ Isis 95 (2004): 654–672.
- ‘Scrapbook Science: Composite Caricatures in Late Georgian England.’ In Figuring It Out: Science, Gender, and Visual Culture, ed. by B. Lightman and A. Shteir, 164–191. Hanover, New Hampshire: University Press of New England, 2006.
- ‘Science’, contribution to symposium on textbooks, Journal of Victorian Culture 12.2 (2007) 272–276.
- ‘The Geohistorical Revolution’, contribution to review symposium on M. Rudwick, Bursting the Limits of Time, Metascience 16 (2007), 375–386.
- ‘From Scientific Conversation to Shop Talk.’ In Science in the Marketplace, ed. by A. Fyfe and B. Lightman, 23–59. Chicago: University of Chicago Press, 2007.
- ‘Science, Technology and Mathematics.’ In The Cambridge History of the Book in Britain, vol. 5, 1830–1914, ed. by D. McKitterick, 443–74. Cambridge: Cambridge University Press (2009).
- ‘Introduction’ to focus section on ‘Darwin as a cultural icon’ Isis 100 (2009), 537–541.
- ‘The Secret History of Victorian Evolution’, Journal of Cambridge Studies 4 (2009), 23–36.
- ‘A Non-Darwinian in the Darwin Year’, Journal of Cambridge Studies 4 (2009), 46–55 (with Haiyan Yang).
- ‘Seriality and Scientific Objects in the Nineteenth Century’, History of Science 48 (2010), 251–285 (with N Hopwood and S Schaffer).
- ‘Global Darwin’ in W. Brown and A C Fabian (eds) Darwin. Cambridge University Press, 2010, 31–57.
- ‘Foreword’ in Science in Print: Essays on the History of Science and the Culture of Print, ed. by R. D. Apple, G. J. Downey and S. L. Vaughn. Madison: University of Wisconsin Press, 2012, vii–xiii.
- ‘Early Science Literacy', Natural History (Dec. 2014-Jan. 2015), 28–33.
- 'Introduction: Communicating Reproduction', Bulletin of the History of Medicine 89 (2015), 379–405 (with N. Hopwood, P. M. Jones and L. Kassell).
- ‘Mary Somerville’s Vision of Science’, Physics Today (1 Jan. 2018), 46–52.
- ‘Global Geology and the Tectonics of Empire’, in Worlds of Natural History, ed. by H. Curry, N. Jardine, J. Secord and E. Spary, 401–417, 610–612. Cambridge: Cambridge University Press, 2018.
- ‘Natural History and its Histories in the Twenty-first Centuries’, in Worlds of Natural History, ed by H. Curry, N. Jardine, J. Secord and E. Spary, 535–544, 632–634. Cambridge: Cambridge University Press, 2018 (with H. Curry). doi:10.1017/9781108225229.034
- ‘Talking Origins’, in Reproduction: Antiquity to the Present Day, ed. by N. Hopwood, R. Flemming and L. Kassell, 375–389. Cambridge: Cambridge University Press, 2018.
- ‘Spontaneous Generation and the Triumph of Experiment’, in Reproduction: Antiquity to the Present Day, ed. by N. Hopwood, R. Flemming and L. Kassell, Exhibit 26. Cambridge: Cambridge University Press, 2018.
- ‘Eureka!’, in Surprise: 107 Variations on the Unexpected, ed. by M. Fend, A. te Heesen, C. von Oertzen and F. Vidal, Berlin: Max Planck Institute for the History of Science, 2019, 356–359. https://www.mpiwg-berlin.mpg.de/sites/default/files/2019-09/surprise_daston_2019.pdf
- ‘Life on the Moon, Newspapers on Earth’, in Moon: A Celebration of our Celestial Neighbour, ed. by M. Vandenbrouck et al., London: Royal Observatory Greenwich, 2019, 150–155, 240.
