= Odium theologicum =

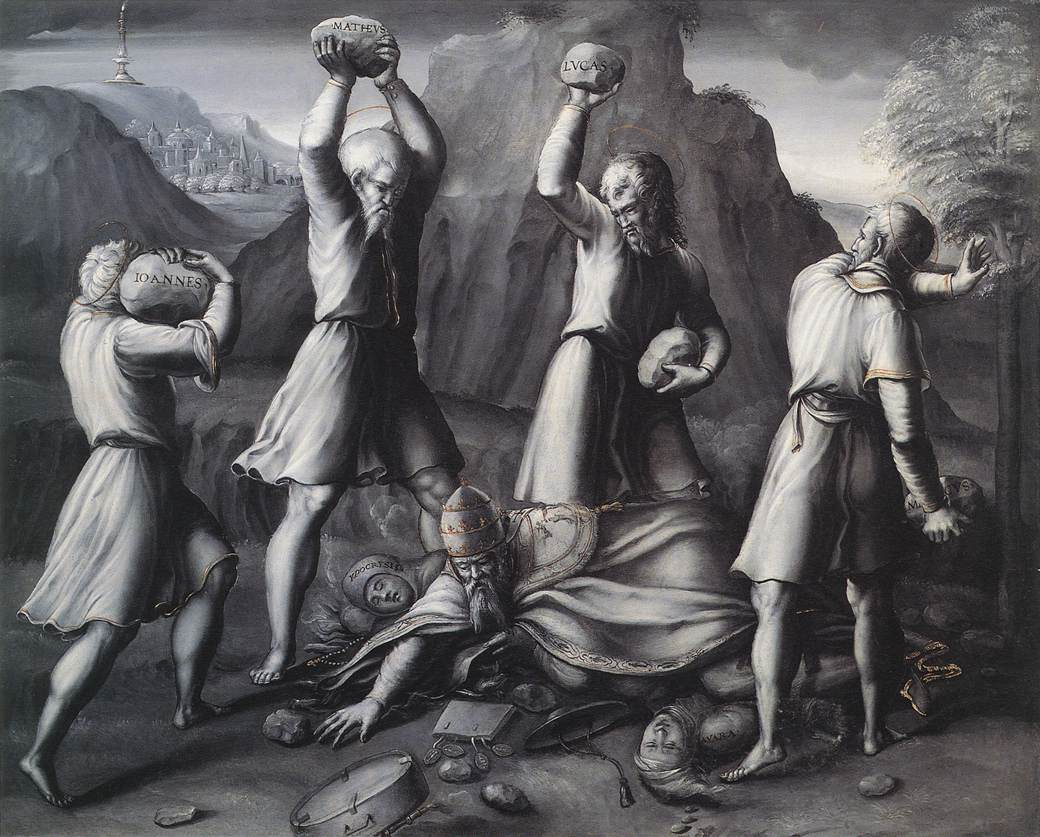
Protestant painting by Girolamo da Treviso showing the four evangelists stoning the pope, hypocrisy and avarice.

The Latin phrase odium theologicum (literally 'theological hatred') is the name originally given to the often intense anger and hatred generated by disputes over theology. It has also been adopted to describe non-theological disputes of a rancorous nature.

John Stuart Mill, discussing the fallibility of the moral consensus in his essay "On Liberty" (1859) refers scornfully to the odium theologicum, saying that, in a sincere bigot, it is one of the most unequivocal cases of moral feeling. In this essay, he takes issue with those who rely on moral feeling rather than reasoned argument to justify their beliefs.

== Academic disputes ==
The early linguist Leonard Bloomfield believed it necessary to develop linguistics as a cumulative, non-personal discipline; as a "genuine" science. In a talk in 1946, speaking of the development of the American Linguistics Society, he stated the fostering of such a discipline had saved it "from the blight of the odium theologicum and the postulation of schools . . . denouncing all persons who disagree or who choose to talk about something else," and he added "The struggle with recalcitrant facts, unyielding in their complexity, trains everyone who works actively in science to be humble, and accustoms him to impersonal acknowledgement of error."

Philosopher and historian of science Thomas Samuel Kuhn argued that scientists are strongly committed to their beliefs, theories and methods (the collection of which he termed "paradigms"), and that science progresses mainly by paradigm shifts. He claimed that scientists with conflicting paradigms will hold to them as dearly as theologians hold to their theological paradigms. Philosopher of mathemathics and science Imre Lakatos, a student of Karl Popper, described the nature of science in a similar manner.

According to Lakatos, science progresses by continual modification or else supersession of what he termed "research programs" (roughly equivalent to Kuhn's "paradigms"). Lakatos claimed that a research program is informed by metaphysical beliefs as well as observation of facts, and may infinitely resist falsification if a scientist wishes to continue holding it in spite of problems or the discovery of new evidence. If this view is correct, science does not remedy odium theologicum, it provides another field in which it may manifest.

In the controversy over the validity of fluxions the philosopher George Berkeley addressed his Newtonian opponent:

You reproach me with "Calumny, detraction, and artifice". You recommend such means as are "innocent and just, rather than the criminal method of lessening or detracting from my opponents". You accuse me of the odium Theologicum, the intemperate Zeal of Divines...

Whatever view of science and the sociology of scientific knowledge is correct, it is a fact that in the history of science there have been many instances of new theories (e.g., germ theory of disease, finitude of the speed of light, radioactivity) being ridiculed and shunned by the greater scientific community when first proposed or discovered, only later to be adopted as more probably accurate.

== See also ==
- Religious intolerance
- Anathema
- Abomination (Bible)
- Worldview
