= William Ballantyne Hodgson =

Scottish educational reformer and political economist

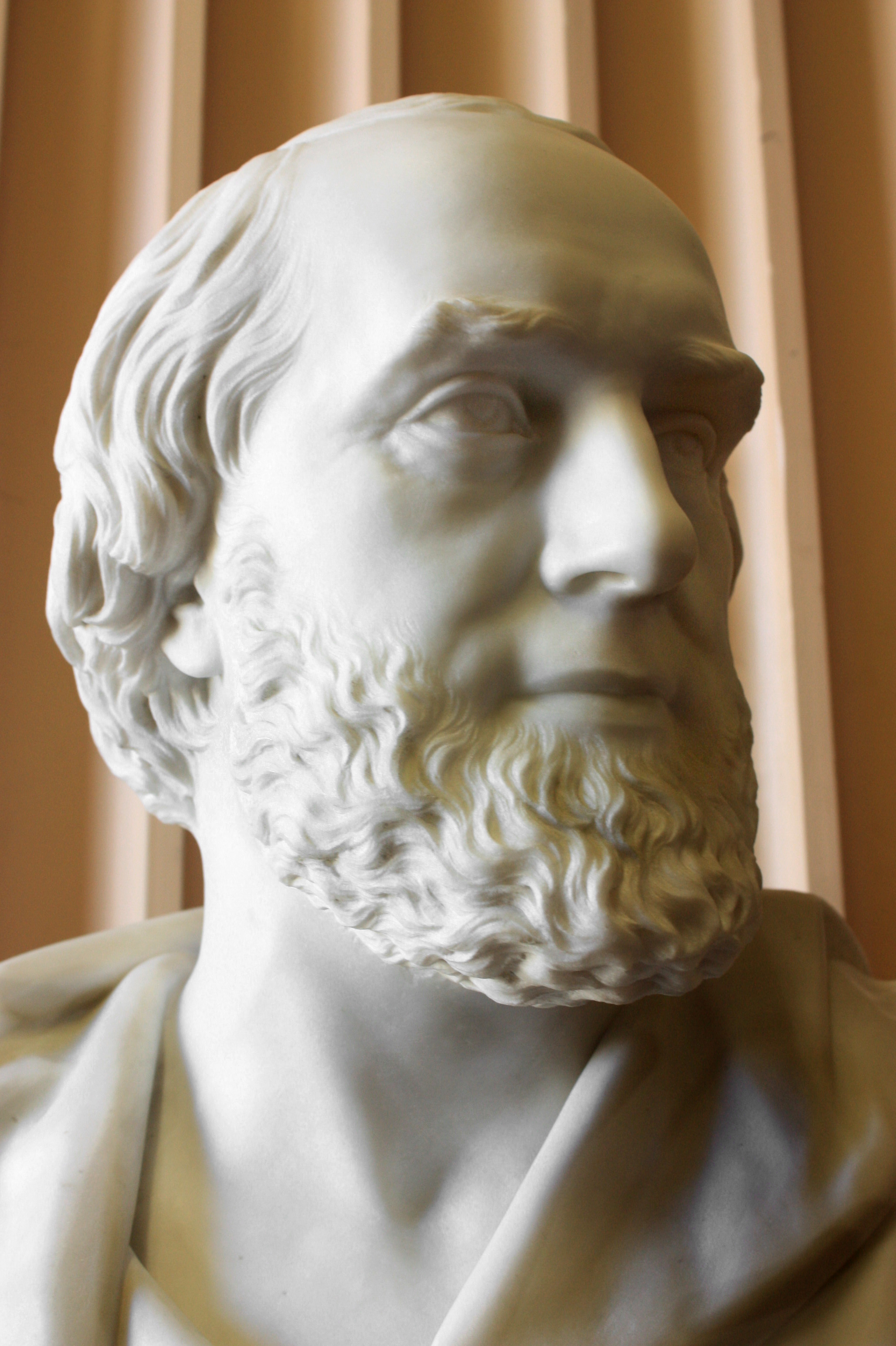
Bust of William Ballantyne Hodgson by William Brodie (c.1875), Old College, the University of Edinburgh

William Ballantyne Hodgson (6 October 1815 – 24 August 1880) was a Scottish educational reformer and political economist.

== Life ==
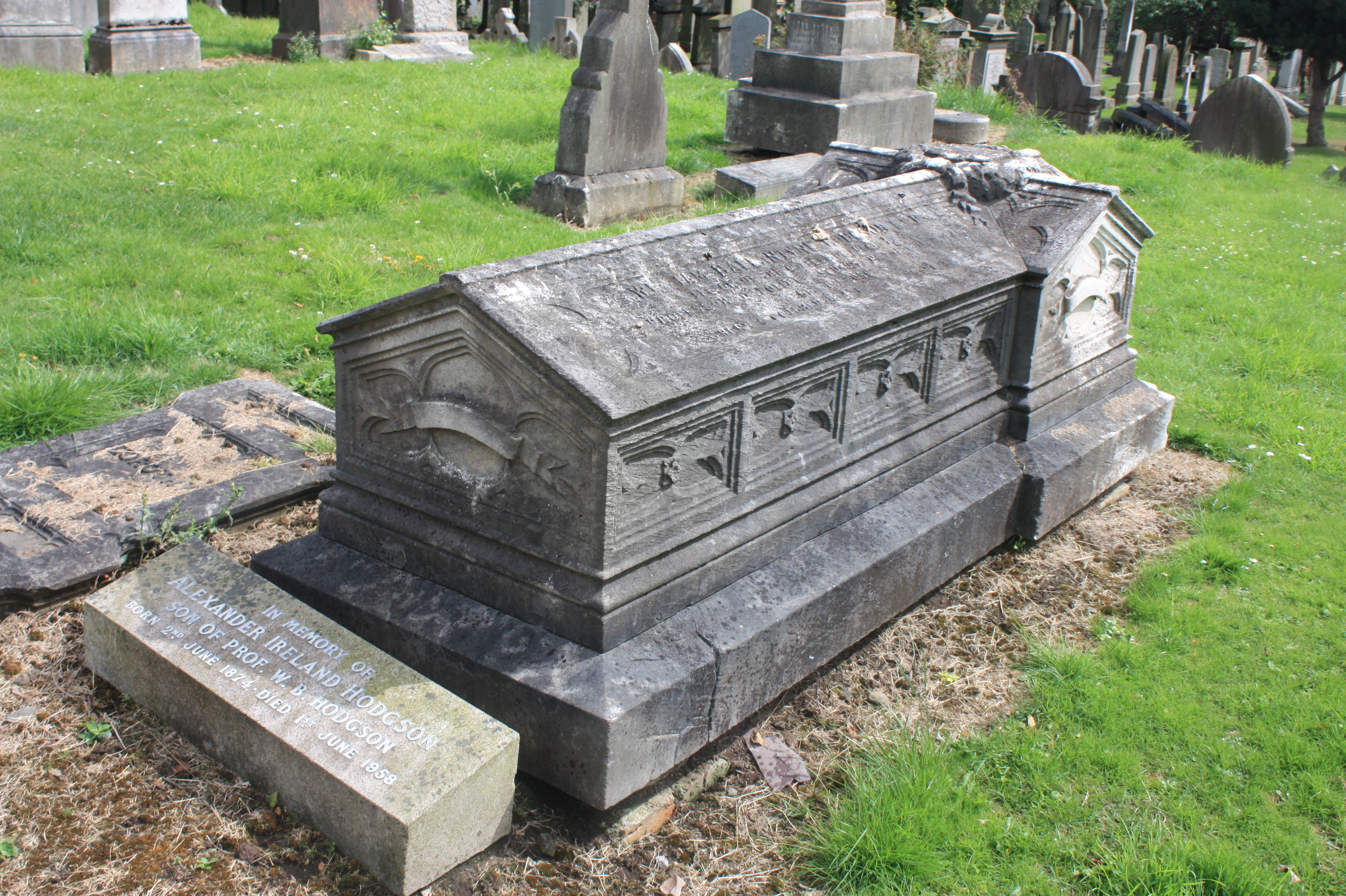
grave of William Ballantyne Hodgson, Grange Cemetery

The son of William Hodgson, a printer, he was born in Edinburgh on 6 October 1815. In 1820 the family were living at 54 Bristo Street in the city. In 1823 he entered the Edinburgh High School, and, after working for a short time in a lawyer's office, matriculated in November 1829, when just turned 14, at the University of Edinburgh. He took no degree as a student.

He was influenced by George Combe's The Constitution of Man.

Initially, Hodgson employed himself in lecturing on literature, education, and phrenology at towns in Fife. On 1 June 1839 he was appointed secretary to the Mechanics' Institute of Liverpool. He was offered the editorship of a Liverpool newspaper in 1841, and that of a Manchester newspaper somewhat later, but declined both. In 1844, on Hodgson's advice, a girls' school was added to the Liverpool Institute, and in the same year he was appointed Principal. On 11 March 1846, he received an honorary LL.D. from the University of Glasgow.

From 1847 to 1851, Hodgson was principal of the Chorlton High School, Manchester. In 1848, he argued for the education of women at the Royal Institution of Manchester. He championed Hannah Elizabeth Pipe who was one of Chorlton's star pupils. In 1851, he travelled abroad, remaining in Paris from October 1851 to July 1852. In 1853 he returned to Edinburgh, giving lectures on physiology, having qualified himself by attending the classes at the College of Surgeons. Because of his work in the field of education, he served in 1849 and again in 1864 as vice-president of the College of Preceptors (College of Teachers).

In 1854 he lectured at the Royal Institution, London, on economic science and, in 1858, he was appointed an assistant commissioner to the inquiry into primary education, moving to London. He was examiner in political economy to London University from 1863 to 1868, and was appointed to the council of University College. As a member of council, Hodgson seconded the confirmation of James Martineau to the vacant chair of mental philosophy; he resigned his seat on the council on 19 January 1867, when George Grote successfully argued for George Croom Robertson over the Unitarian Martineau.

In 1870 Hodgson retired to Bournemouth, but in the following year (17 July 1871) he was appointed to the new Chair of political economy and mercantile law at the University of Edinburgh. He frequently attended the social science congresses, acting at Norwich in 1873 as president of the educational section. In 1875, he was made president of the Educational Institute of Scotland. In his political outlook, Hodgson was strongly Liberal, but he took little active part in politics. He settled at Bonaly Tower, Colinton, a Scottish baronial house built by Lord Cockburn.

Hodgson died of heart disease in Brussels while attending the educational congress there on 24 August 1880. He was buried at the Grange cemetery, Edinburgh. The grave lies above the central vaults, towards the west, and is the closest to the path.

== Family ==
He married, first (in 1841), Jane Cox of Liverpool, who died without issue on 1 July 1860; and secondly (on 14 January 1863), Emily Walmsley (1829–1919), second daughter of Sir Joshua Walmsley of Liverpool, who survived him, with two sons and two daughters.

His son, Alexander Ireland Hodgson (1874–1958) is buried with William.

== Works ==
He published:

- 'Lecture on Education,’ &c., Edinburgh, 1837.
- 'Address … to the Mental Improvement Society of the Liverpool Mechanics' Institute,’ &c., Liverpool [1845].
- 'The Secular, the Religious, and the Theological,’ &c., 1850.
- 'On the Importance of the Study of Economic Science,’ &c., 1855; 1860; 1866.
- 'On the Report of the Commissioners ... to inquire into ... Public Schools,’ &c., 1864,(two editions same year).
- 'Classical Instruction,’ &c., 1866.
- 'The Education of Girls,’ &c., 1864–6; 2nd edit. 1869.
- 'The True Scope of Economic Science,’ &c., 1870.
- 'Turgot: his Life, Times, and Opinions,’ &c., 1870.
- 'Inaugural Address,’ &c., Edinburgh, 1871.

Posthumous was Errors in the Use of English, Edinburgh, 1881, edited by his widow. He contributed a preface and notes to Horace Mann's Report of an Educational Tour in Germany, &c., 1846; edited, with Henry James Slack, the memorial edition (1865, &c.) of the Works of William Johnson Fox; and translated Count Cavour's Thoughts on Ireland, &c., 1868.

== Sources ==
- Burke's Landed Gentry, 18th edn, vol 3, Wells of Mere House and Marlands, Lineage of Hodgson
