= Robert Chambers Jr. =

Scottish publisher and encyclopaedist (1832–1888)

- Born: 5 March 1832; Edinburgh
- Died: 23 March 1888 (aged 56); Claremont Crescent, Edinburgh
- Citizenship: United Kingdom
- Education: Circus Place School, Edinburgh
- Occupations: Partner, W & R Chambers Ltd, Publisher, Edinburgh (1853-88); Active in the production of Chambers' Encyclopaedia (1859-68); Editor, Chambers' Journal (1874)
- Spouse: Laura Anderson (1856)
- Children: Eldest son: Charles Edward Stuart Chambers (born 1859), editor of the Journal and chairman of W. & R. Chambers
- Parent: Father: Robert Chambers
- Relatives: Nephew of William Chambers

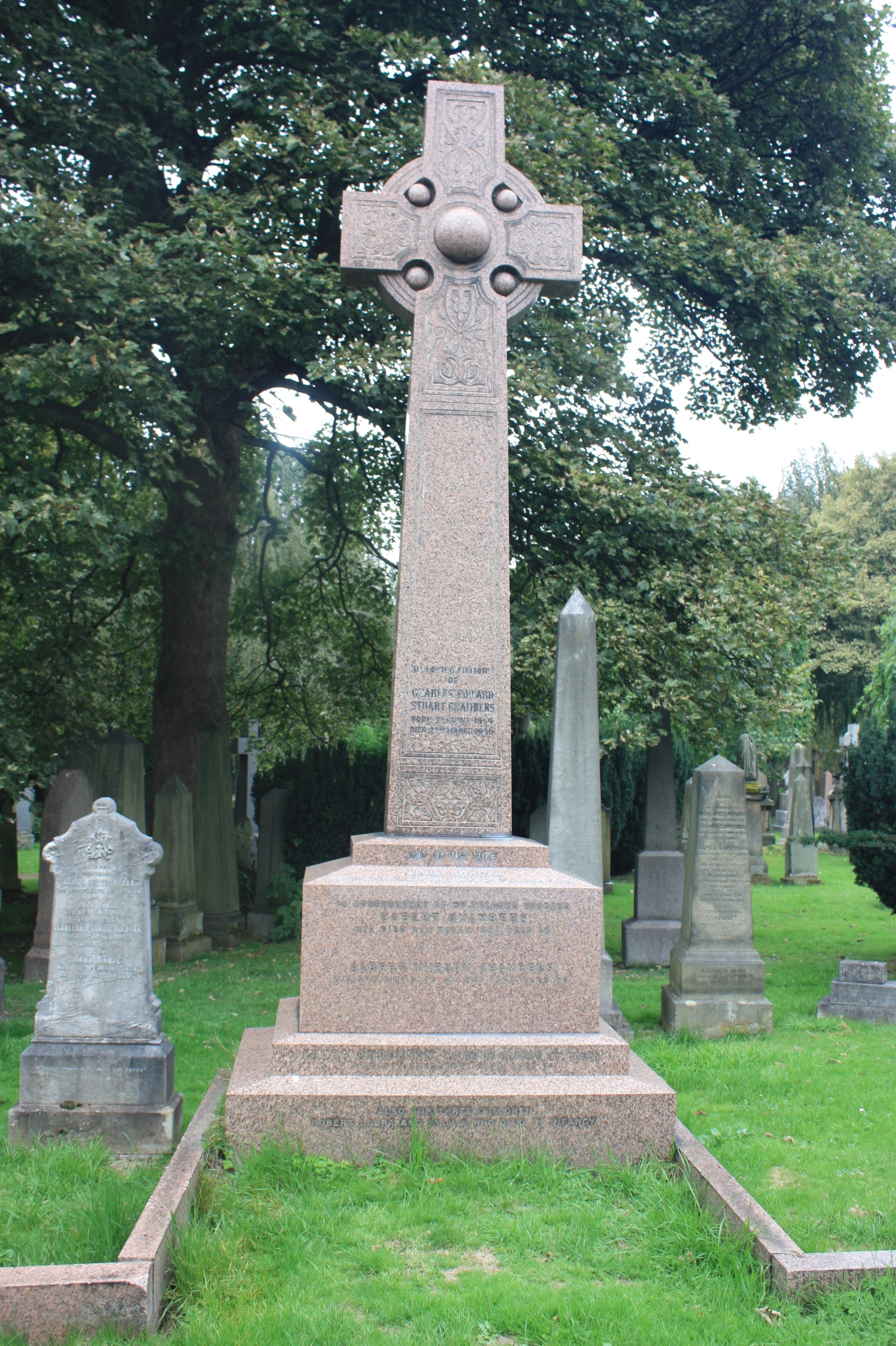
Robert Chambers' grave, Dean Cemetery

Robert Chambers FRSE (5 March 1832 – 23 March 1888) was a Scottish publisher, editor of Chambers' Journal, amateur golfer and encyclopaedist, the son of Robert Chambers, the co-founder of the W & R Chambers publishing house in Edinburgh.

== Life ==
He became a member of the publishing firm in 1853, and in 1862 wrote an excellent book on golfing, A Few Rambling Remarks on Golf. A poem on St. Andrews Links was the joint work of Chambers and his father. In 1874, on the resignation of James Payn, he became editor of Chambers's Journal; he occasionally contributed papers, and he conducted the magazine with great success. On the death of his uncle William in 1883, the whole responsibility of the publishing house devolved upon him, but he was assisted during the last two or three years of his life by his eldest son, Charles Chambers. He took an active part in the production of the first edition of Chambers's Encyclopædia (1859–68), and helped in the preliminary work in connection with the new edition. He also assisted Alexander Ireland, in the preparation of the 1884 edition of his father's Vestiges of the Natural History of Creation, in which was given the first authoritative information of the authorship.

== Golf career ==
=== 1861 Open Championship ===
Chambers placed 10th in the 1861 Open Championship, held at Prestwick Golf Club, Ayrshire, Scotland. It was the second 'national' competition at Prestwick, but the first to be 'open' to amateurs as well as professionals, and thus considered by many as the first true Open. Ten professionals and eight amateurs contested the event, with Tom Morris Sr. winning the championship by 4 shots from Willie Park Sr. Robert was the second best amateur, with a total of 187 for three rounds of the 12-hole Prestwick course.

=== Grand Tournament 1858 ===
Previously, Chambers had won the second Grand National Tournament held on the Old Course at St Andrews in 1858, when he beat Mr. Wallace of Leven in match play on the last hole. He represented Bruntsfield Links Golfing Society in this match. They played at Bruntsfield Links in Edinburgh 1761-1876 and held a dinner in his honour to celebrate the result.

Robert was also a member of other clubs. This included Tantallon Golf Club at North Berwick, where he was Captain for eight years. He tried unsuccessfully to get them to buy a clubhouse when the other North Berwick golfers did so.

Robert Chambers and George Morris (brother of Old Tom Morris) laid out the original golf course at Hoylake in 1869 for the club who would become the Royal Liverpool Golf Club. George's son, Jack Morris, stayed on as the first professional. George Morris was Robert Chambers' long-term caddie for 25 years.

Almost as famous as his golf victories, is the time when Robert umpired the match between Old Tom Morris and Willie Park Sr. in 1870 at Musselburgh. He stopped the match after the local crowd were interfering with play, which Willie Park refused to accept.

Chambers wrote extensively on golf, not surprisingly, as he owned a publishing company. He was a member of the St. Giles's Cathedral board, and, like his uncle, took much interest in the church.

== Later life and death ==
In his later years, Chambers was for a long time in delicate health and spent most of his time at North Berwick or St. Andrews. He died of an affection of the heart on 23 March 1888 at his house in Claremont Crescent in the eastern New Town, Edinburgh. He is buried on the north side of one of the central paths in Dean Cemetery in Edinburgh.

== Family ==
He was married to Laura Anderson. His eldest daughter Violet Tweedale (1862–1936) was a novelist and spiritualist, who became a friend of the famous Theosophist Helena Blavatsky. Other children included Charles Edward Stuart Chambers (1859–1936).
