= List of French dictionaries =

List of notable French dictionaries

Monolingual dictionaries

Title	Year
Catholicon - purported first French dictionary	1499
Thresor de la langue françoyse tant ancienne que moderne (Jean Nicot)	1606
Dictionnaire de l'Académie française	1694 to present
Littré	1877
Grand Dictionnaire Encyclopédique Larousse	1982-1985
Grand dictionnaire universel du XIXe siècle	1866-1890
Dictionnaire des ouvrages anonymes et pseudonymes	1806-1809
Petit Larousse	1905 to present
Petit Robert	1967 to present
L'Officiel du jeu Scrabble	1990 to present
Trésor de la langue française informatisé	1971 to present

French–English bilingual dictionaries

Title	Year
Collins-Robert French Dictionary	1978 to present
Harrap's Shorter French Dictionary	1940 to present
Oxford–Hachette French Dictionary	1994 to present

== See also ==
- List of Arabic dictionaries
- List of Chinese dictionaries
- List of English dictionaries
- List of Dutch dictionaries
- List of German dictionaries
- List of Japanese dictionaries
