= Violet Tweedale =

Scottish writer, poet, and Spiritualist

Violet Tweedale (née Chambers; 1862 – 10 December 1936) was a Scottish writer, poet, and Spiritualist.

She was a prolific author of short stories, published as anthologies, and novels, often with a romantic or supernatural theme. She wrote over 30 books on spiritual subjects, such as The Cosmic Christ (1930), and her own personal psychic experiences were documented in Ghosts I Have Seen (1920). Apart from her literary output, she was a gifted amateur artist, embroiderer, and an accomplished pianist; she was also a skilled orator who spoke up for workers' rights.

Tweedale was an avid golfer and was known as the best lady golfer in her region.

== Life and work ==
Violet Tweedale was born in Edinburgh, the eldest daughter of Robert Chambers Jr., editor of Chambers' Journal, and the granddaughter of Robert Chambers, the publisher and founder of W & R Chambers.

In her teens she assisted her father in his work, and in 1889 moved to London where she had her first novel, And They Two, published, and became involved in humanitarian "rescue work" in the East End. In 1891, she married Clarens Tweedale. In London, she moved in the best social circles, counting among her friends, poet Robert Browning, artist Frederic Leighton, Anne Proctor (mother of Adelaide Proctor) and many others. She also had influential contacts abroad including Marie, Countess of Caithness, Duchess of Medina Pomar (Papal States), who was close to Theosophist Helena Blavatsky. In 1901-1902, her recently published work, Her Grace's Secret was reworked into a play by Arnold Bennett, but it was never produced for stage.

Claiming to be psychic from a young age, she became involved in Spiritualism and was a member of the Hermetic Order of the Golden Dawn. She was also involved in Theosophy, and was a close associate of Helena Blavatsky. She worked with the mediums Charles Williams and Cecil Husk (1847–1920), and was called as an expert witness when trance medium, Meurig Morris, sued the Daily Mail for libel in April 1932—although the case went against Morris, no fraud or dishonesty on the medium's part was proven.

== Bibliography (selected) ==
Non-fiction

- Unsolved Mysteries (Digby & Co., 1895)
- Ghosts I have seen: and other psychic experiences (New York: F.A. Stokes Co., 1919).
- Phantoms of the Dawn (J. Long, 1924). Foreword by Arthur Conan Doyle. (Reprinted By Solar Press in 2024)
- Found Dead and other true ghost stories (Herbert Jenkins, 1928).
- Mellow Sheaves [Discussion of psychological problems. With a portrait. (Rider, 1927).
- The Cosmic Christ (Rider, 1930).

Fiction

- And They Two (G. Redway, 1897)
- What Shall it Profit a Man? (Digby, Long & Co, 1897)
- Her Grace's Secret (Jacobs, 1901).
- The Hazards of Life (John Long, 1904)
- The Honeycomb of Life (1904).
- Lord Eversleigh's Sins (John Long, 1905).
- Lady Sarah's Son (1906).
- The portals of Love (J. Long, 1906).
- The Sweets of Office (Long, 1907).
- An Empty Heritage (1908)
- The Quenchless Flame (John Long, London, 1909).
- Hypocrites and Sinners (J. Long, 1910).
- A Reaper of the Whirlwind (John Long, 1911).
- The House of the Other World (John Long, London, 1913)
- An Unholy Alliance (1915).
- Love and War (1916).
- Wingate's Wife (J. Long, 1916).
- The Heart of a Woman (Hurst and Blackett Ltd., 1917).
- The Veiled Woman (H. Jenkins, 1918).
- The Beautiful Mrs. Davenant (Frederick A. Stokes, New York, 1920).
- The Green Lady (Herbert Jenkins, 1921).
- The Passing Storm (1922).
- The School of Virtue (Long, 1923)
- The Mammonist (Hutchinson, 1927).
