= David Patrick (writer) =

- Born: 1849; Lochwinnoch, Renfrewshire, Scotland
- Died: 22 March 1914 (aged 65); Edinburgh, Scotland
- Occupations: Writer, editor
- Writing career
- Genres: Non-fiction, encyclopedias
- Notable works: Chambers's Encyclopaedia, Chambers's Biographical Dictionary, Chambers's Cyclopaedia of English Literature

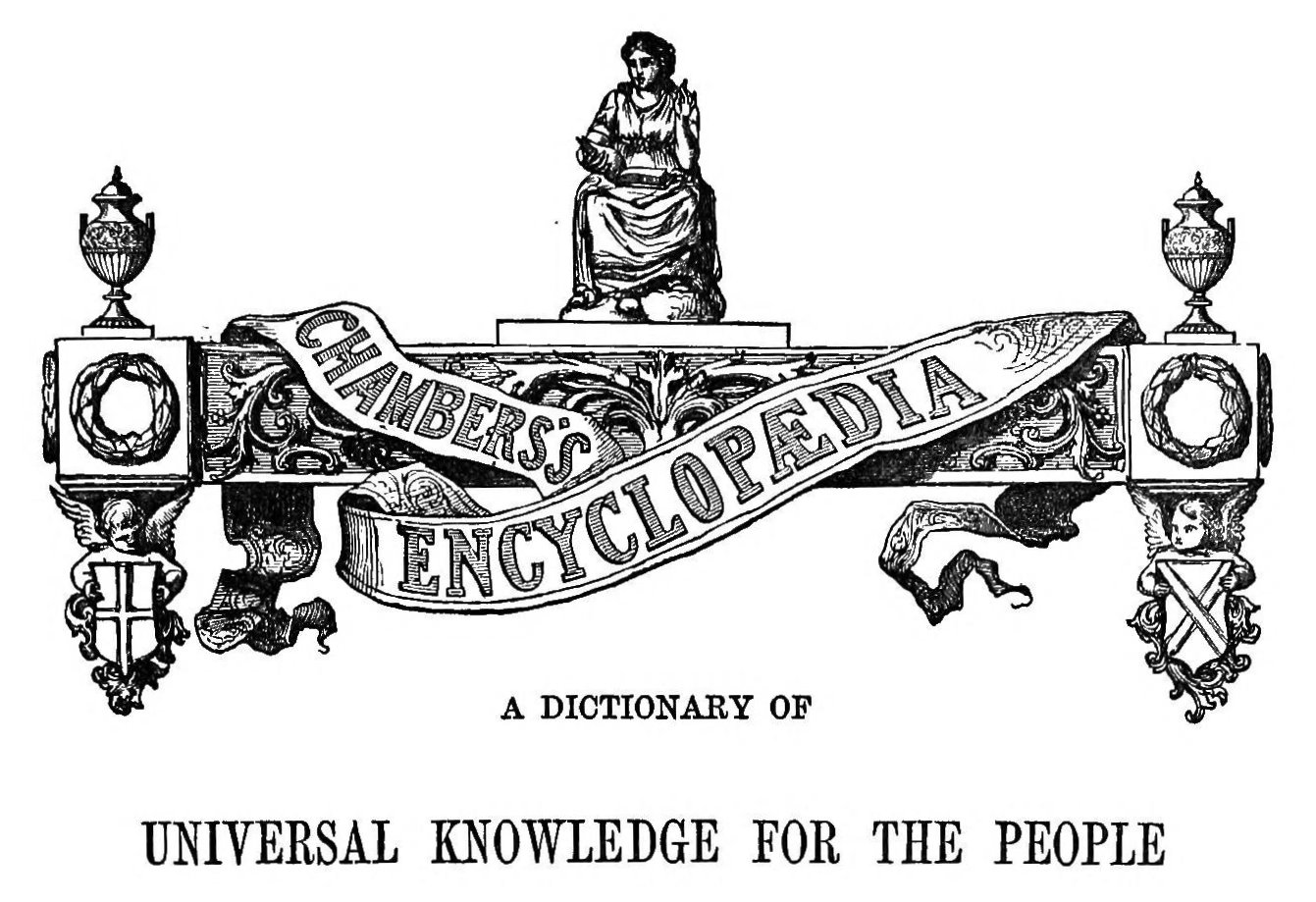
The design and wording that appeared at the start of each volume of the Chambers's Encyclopaedia.

David Patrick FRSE LLD (1849 – 22 March 1914) was a Scottish writer and editor. He edited Chambers's Encyclopaedia from 1888 to 1892, Chambers's Biographical Dictionary in 1897 and Chambers's Cyclopaedia of English Literature with F. H. Groome from 1901 to 1903.

== Life ==
David Patrick was born to the Rev. Joseph Patrick (1814–1871) in the Free Church manse at Ochiltree on 19 April 1849. His mother was Mary Barbour (b.1824),

He was educated at the Ayr Academy and then, planning to enter the Free Church of Scotland (as his father), attended the New College in Edinburgh, receiving the Cunningham Fellowship at the close of his four-year course. Patrick subsequently studied theology at Tübingen, Berlin, Leipzig and Göttingen before eventually deciding on a literary career.

It was while working under Dr. J M Ross of the Edinburgh High School, then producing the Globe Encyclopaedia series, that he was introduced to encyclopaedical work. Within a few years, he had attained a position with the publishing house of William & Robert Chambers. He first worked as an assistant to Dr. Andrew Findlater in the Literary Department, and ultimately became head of the literary staff.

In 1888 he was elected a Fellow of the Royal Society of Edinburgh. His proposers were Sir John Murray, Robert Cox. John Buchan, and Peter Guthrie Tait.

Between 1888 and 1892, he edited a revised version of Chambers's Encyclopaedia. He also edited Chambers's Biographical Dictionary in 1897 and Chambers's Cyclopaedia of English Literature with F.H. Groome from 1901 to 1903. He wrote the introduction to the later 1914 edition of Chambers's Encyclopaedia shortly before his death on 22 March 1914.

He had premises at 339 High Street on the Royal Mile and lived at 20 Mansionhouse Road in the Grange.
