= Roger Georges Morvan =

Roger Georges Morvan (1927–1993) was a French encyclopedist, lexicographer, and poet.

== Career ==
Earlier in his career, Morvan worked with Paul Robert, the creator of the Dictionnaire Robert and the Collins-Robert French Dictionary.

Morvan founded and directed L'Encyclopédie Internationale des Sciences et des Techniques, a ten-volume encyclopedia containing over 3,500 entries contributed by approximately 800 scientists, including French Nobel laureates.

In 1985, Morvan published Le Petit Retz Morvan, a dictionary of affixes and roots.

Morvan recorded his poetry with French actor Michel Bouquet, resulting in two cassettes titled Chants. He also worked with his wife, Christine Morvan-Hanf, on developing the "Method Morvan," a system designed to make the French language more accessible to adult English speakers by utilizing similarities between the two languages' vocabularies.

== Recognition ==
- 1975: Prix du Rayonnement de la langue et de la littérature françaises
