= Robert Carruthers =

Scottish journalist and miscellaneous writer

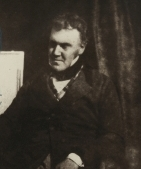
Robert Carruthers

Robert Carruthers (5 November 1799– 26 May 1878) was a Scottish journalist and miscellaneous writer.

He was born in Dumfriesshire and was for a time a teacher in Huntingdon. He wrote a History of Huntingdon in 1824. In 1828 he became editor of the Inverness Courier, in which role he continued for many years.

He edited Alexander Pope's works with a memoir (1853), and along with Robert Chambers edited the first edition of Chambers' Cyclopædia of English Literature (1842–44). He received the degree of LL.D. from Edinburgh.

One of his daughters married the sculptor Alexander Munro.
