= Chambers Dictionary =

English language dictionary first published in 1872

The Chambers Dictionary was first published by William and Robert Chambers as Chambers's English Dictionary in 1872. It was an expanded version of Chambers's Etymological Dictionary of 1867, compiled by James Donald. A second edition came out in 1898, and was followed in 1901 by a new compact edition called Chambers's Twentieth Century Dictionary.

The dictionary is widely used by British crossword solvers and setters, and by Scrabble players (though it is no longer the official Scrabble dictionary). It contains many more dialectal, archaic, unconventional and eccentric words than its rivals, and is noted for its occasional wryly humorous definitions. Examples of such definitions include those for éclair ("a cake, long in shape but short in duration") and middle-aged ("between youth and old age, variously reckoned to suit the reckoner"). These jocular definitions were removed by the publisher in the 1970s, but many of them were reinstated in 1983 because of the affection in which they were held by readers.

The twelfth edition of The Chambers Dictionary was published in August 2011 by Chambers Harrap Publishers Ltd and runs to 1936 pages with 62,500 main entries. This edition is available for mobile use as an iPhone, iPad, or Android app. That has been followed by the thirteenth edition published in 2014. Also on sale is the smaller 21st Century Dictionary of 1664 pages, where "the focus is on the English that people use today, and definitions are given in straightforward, accessible language". This dictionary can be accessed for free online.

== Scrabble ==
In an agreement with Mattel's predecessor, J. W. Spear & Sons, the Chambers Dictionary was, for several decades, the official source of words for the book Official Scrabble Words (OSW), a lexicon of all words and inflections playable in tournament Scrabble within the UK and other countries such as New Zealand and Australia. In 2005, Mattel changed the source dictionary to Collins English Dictionary.

== See also ==
- Chambers's Encyclopaedia
