= Chambers Book of Days =

Book by Robert Chambers

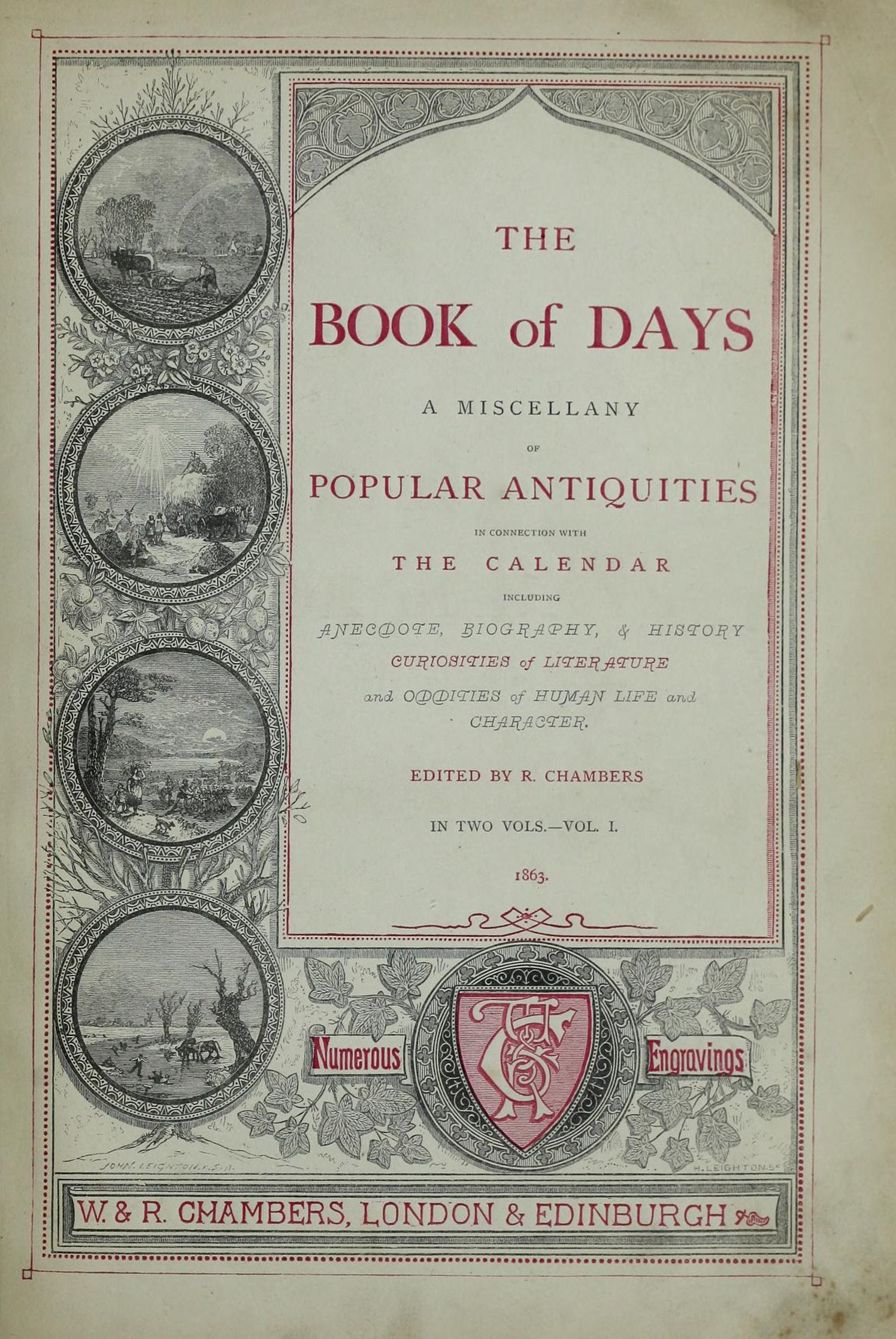
- First edition title page
- Author: Robert Chambers
- Publication date: 1864

Chambers Book of Days (The Book of Days: A Miscellany of Popular Antiquities in Connection with the Calendar, Including Anecdote, Biography, & History, Curiosities of Literature and Oddities of Human Life and Character) was written by the Scottish author Robert Chambers and first published in 1864.

A new version of Chambers Book of Days was published by Chambers Harrap in 2004.

== The Book of Days (1864) ==
The Book of Days was Robert Chambers's last publication, and perhaps his most elaborate. It is a huge collection of short, largely factual pieces that today might be bracketed as "trivia", but very interesting trivia. The formula has been much repeated. It is supposed that his excessive labour in connection with this book hastened his death.

The book was published in two large volumes, each over 840 pages long, and, for its day, was well-illustrated with engraved drawings linked to the articles. Its full title is The Book of Days: A Miscellany of Popular Antiquities in Connection with the Calendar: Including Anecdote, Biography, & History, Curiosities and Literature, and Oddities of Human Life and Character. It is well-indexed, adding much to its value as a reference tool.

Each day, listed in chronological order, gives a short list of saints connected to the day and famous persons born on that day or dying on that day. Individuals are then selected from these lists for more detailed articles. With six or seven articles each day, the total number of articles, which are in the form of erudite essays, runs to around 2,000. The book has frequently been quoted in other reference books.

Chambers carried out his research for the book in 1860 and 1861, primarily in the British Museum in London. He then spent 1862 and 1863 organising the assembled essays into chronological order and editing the work. The task is said to have mentally ruined him.

== Chambers Book of Days (2004) ==
In 2004 Chambers Harrap published a new Book of Days. Rosalind Fergusson wrote for the Chambers Harrap website that:

Like its illustrious predecessor, Chambers Book of Days (2004) is a compendium of information relating to the days, months, and seasons of the year, selected and presented with the personal touch of the author. ... At the same time, the style of Chambers Book of Days (1864) has been preserved by the inclusion of numerous passage from the original volumes, and the selection of these was one of the current author's more pleasurable tasks. It is hard to surpass Robert Chambers' lyrical descriptions of the characteristics of the changing seasons, for example, extracts of which are included at the beginning of each month.
