= Andrew Findlater =

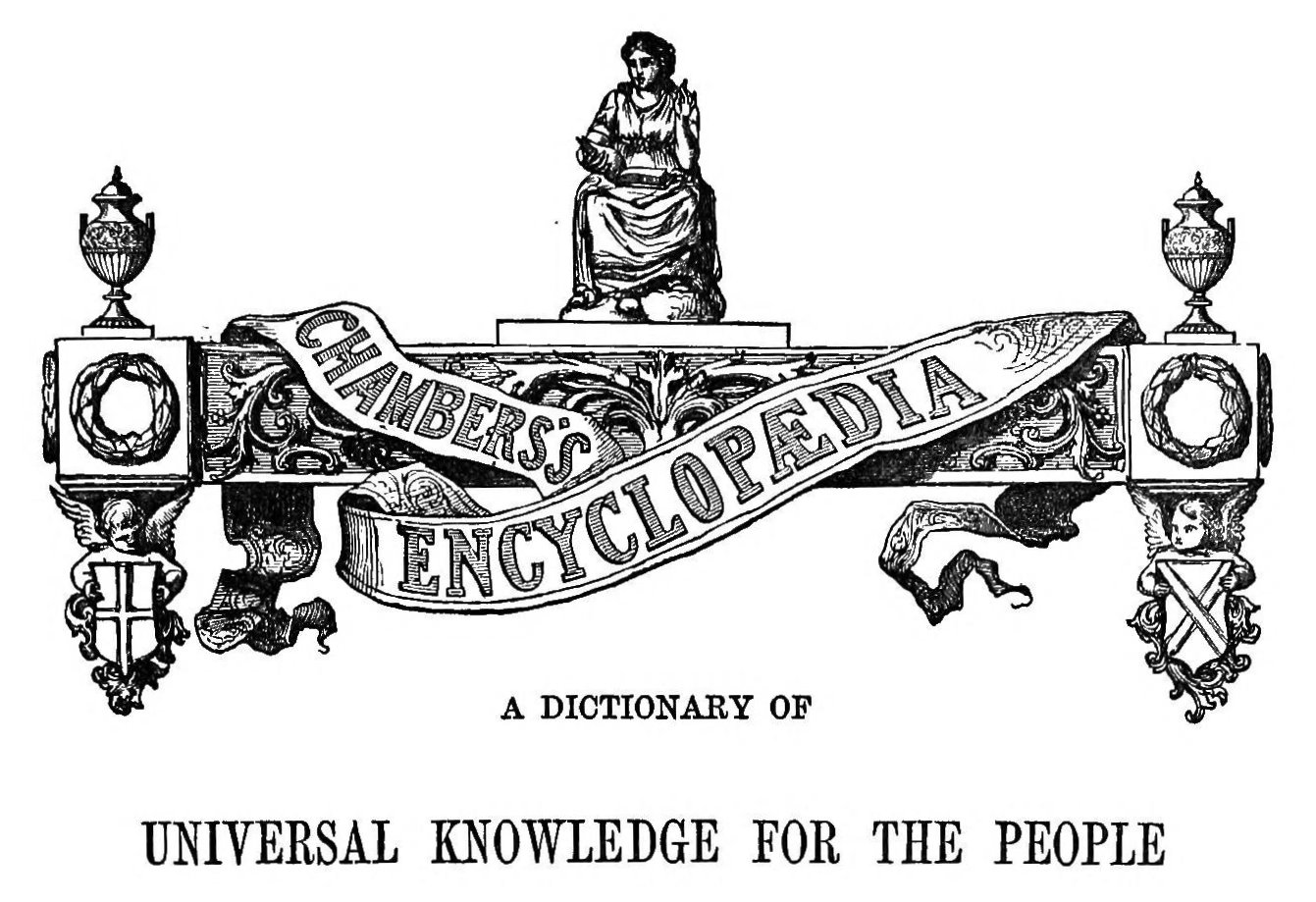
The design and wording that appeared at the start of each volume of the first edition of Chambers's Encyclopaedia.

Andrew Findlater (17 December 1810 – 1 January 1885) was a Scottish editor notable for his work on Chambers's Encyclopaedia.

== Biography ==
He was born near Aberdour, Aberdeenshire, the son of a small farmer. By hard study in the evening, after his day's work on the farm was finished, he qualified himself for entrance at the University of Aberdeen, and after graduating as MA he attended the Divinity classes with the idea of entering the ministry. He qualified as a schoolmaster and went to Canada before beginning his association with Chambers.

In 1853 he began that connection with the firm of W. & R. Chambers which gave direction to his subsequent activity. His first engagement was the editing of a revised edition of their Information for the People (1857). In this capacity he gave evidence of qualities and acquirements that marked him as a suitable editor for Chambers's Encyclopaedia, then projected, and his was the directing mind that gave it its character. Many of the more important articles were written by him. This work occupied him until 1868, and he afterwards edited a revised edition (1874). He also had charge of other publications for the same firm, and wrote regularly for the Scotsman.

Findlater was associated with John Stuart Mill and George Grote and friends with William Thackeray and the French philologist Émile Littré. In 1864 he was made LL.D. of Aberdeen University. in 1877 he gave up active work for Chambers, but his services were retained as consulting editor. He died in Edinburgh in 1885.
