= Oxford–Hachette French Dictionary =

The Oxford–Hachette French Dictionary is one of the most comprehensive bilingual French–English / English–French dictionaries. It was the first such dictionary to be written using a computerized corpus. It contains 360,000 words and expressions and 555,000 translations. The first edition was published in 1994, with its second, third and fourth editions appearing in 1997, 2001 and 2007, respectively. The dictionary is entirely bilingual, and it is marketed under two different names, one French, one English:

- Le grand dictionnaire Hachette–Oxford
- Oxford–Hachette French Dictionary

A concise or condensed version is also available. Both are jointly published by Oxford University Press and Hachette Education.

Its two main competitors are Harrap's Shorter French Dictionary published by Chambers Harrap Publishers and Collins-Robert French Dictionary published by HarperCollins.
