= Collins Spanish Dictionary =

Collins dictionary for Spanish and English

Collins Spanish Dictionary, Complete & Unabridged Edition
- Title page of the Eighth Edition
- Author: Colin Smith (previous editions), various other contributors
- Language: English, Spanish
- Subject: Lexicography
- Genre: Bilingual dictionary
- Publisher: HarperCollins, Grupo Editorial Random House Mondadori S.L.
- Publication date: 1971, 1988, 1992, 1993, 1996, 2007, 2000, 2003, 2005
- Publication place: United Kingdom, United States, Spain
- Media type: 1 hardback volume
- Pages: 2141 (eighth edition)
- ISBN: 978-0-00-718374-6 (UK); 0-00-718374-7 (UK); 84-253-3940-5 (ES)
- OCLC: 223184012
- Dewey Decimal: 463/.21 22
- LC Class: PC4640 .C595 2005

The Collins Spanish Dictionary is a bilingual dictionary of English and Spanish derived from the Collins Word Web, an analytical linguistics database. As well as its primary function as a bilingual dictionary, it also contains usage guides for English and Spanish (known as Lengua y Uso and Language in Use respectively) and English and Spanish verb tables. In 2009, the dictionary was brought to the iPhone & iPad platform. The iOS app of this dictionary, which has become one of the most popular Spanish dictionaries in the App Store since then, is developed by Cole Zhu Inc.

== See also ==
- Collins-Robert French Dictionary
