= Robert Chambers (publisher, born 1802) =

Scottish publisher and writer

Robert Chambers FRSE FGS
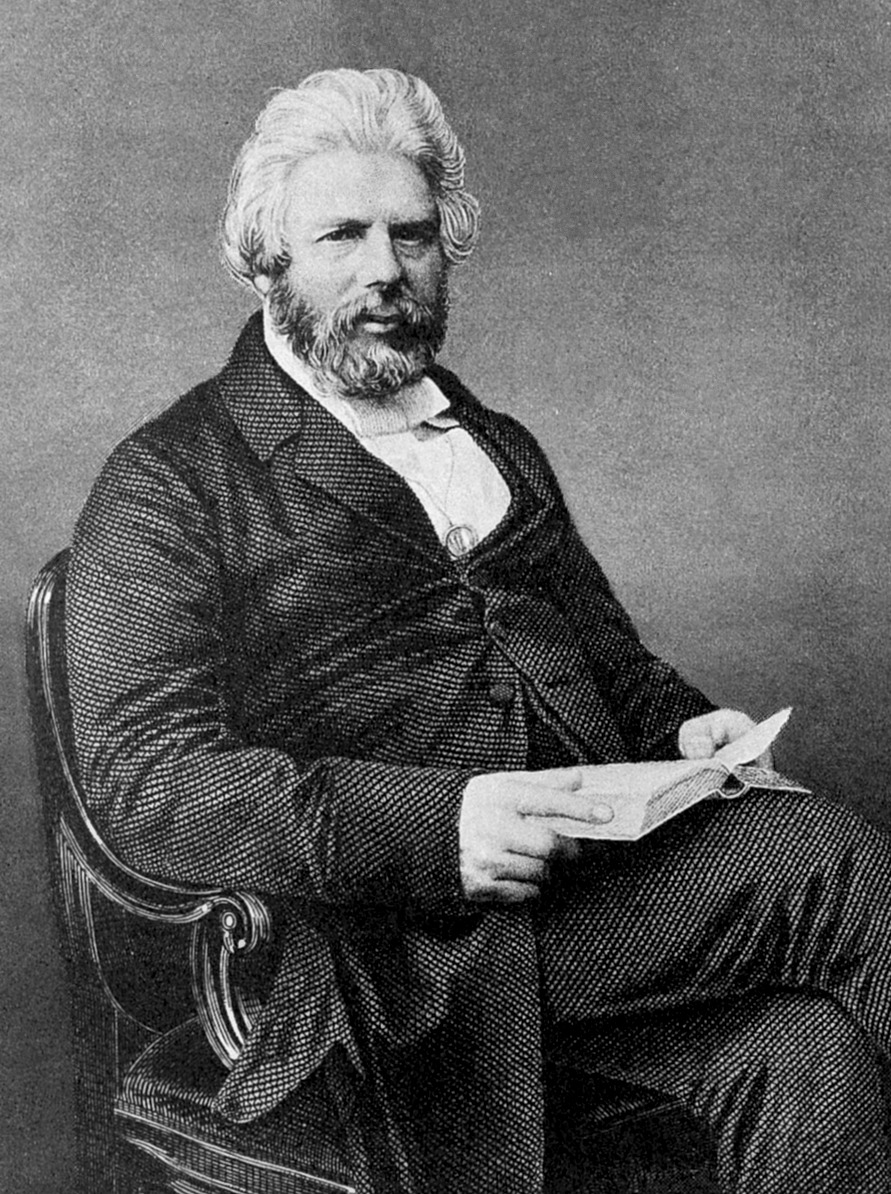
- Chambers, c. 1863
- Born: 10 July 1802; Peebles, Peeblesshire, Scotland
- Died: 17 March 1871 (aged 68); St Andrews, Fife, Scotland
- Resting place: St Regulus Chapel, St Andrews
- Education: The High School, Edinburgh
- Occupations: Co-founder and partner, W. & R. Chambers Publishers, Edinburgh
- Spouses: Anne Kirkwood (m. 1829–1863); (unknown wife) (m. 1867–1879)
- Children: Robert Chambers Jr.
- Relatives: William Chambers (brother); Violet Tweedale (granddaughter)
- Writing career
- Notable work: Vestiges of Creation (1844)

Robert Chambers (/ˈtʃeɪmbərz/; 10 July 1802 – 17 March 1871) was a Scottish publisher, geologist, evolutionary thinker, author and journal editor who, like his elder brother and business partner William Chambers, was highly influential in mid-19th-century scientific and political circles.

Chambers was an early phrenologist in the Edinburgh Phrenological Society. He was also the anonymous author of Vestiges of the Natural History of Creation, which was so controversial that his authorship was not acknowledged until after his death.

== Early life ==
Chambers was born in Peebles in the Scottish Borders 10 July 1802 to Jean Gibson (c. 1781–1843) and James Chambers, a cotton manufacturer. He was their second son of six children. The town had changed little in centuries. The town had old and new parts, each consisting of little more than a single street. Peebles was mainly inhabited by weavers and labourers living in thatched cottages. His father, James Chambers, made his living as a cotton manufacturer. Their slate-roofed house was built by James Chambers's father as a wedding gift for his son, and the ground floor served as the family workshop.

A small circulating library in the town, run by Alexander Elder, introduced Robert to books and developed his literary interests when he was young. Occasionally his father would buy books for the family library, and one day Robert found a complete set of the fourth edition of the Encyclopædia Britannica hidden away in a chest in the attic. He eagerly read this for many years. Near the end of his life, Chambers remembered feeling "a profound thankfulness that such a convenient collection of human knowledge existed, and that here it was spread out like a well-plenished table before me." Robert's older brother, William, later recalled that for Robert, "the acquisition of knowledge was with him the highest of earthly enjoyments."

Robert was sent to local schools and showed unusual literary taste and ability, though he found his schooling to be uninspiring. His education was typical for the day. The country school, directed by James Gray, taught the boys reading, writing, and, for an additional charge, arithmetic. In grammar school it was the classics—Latin and Ancient Greek, with some English composition. Boys bullied one another and the teacher administered corporal punishment in the classroom for unruly behaviour. Although uninspired by the school, Robert made up for this at the bookseller.

Both Robert and William were born with six fingers on each hand and six toes on each foot. Their parents attempted to correct this abnormality through operations, and while William's was successful Robert was left partially lame. So while other boys roughed it outside, Robert was content to stay indoors and study his books.

Robert surpassed his elder brother in his education, which he continued for several years beyond William's. Robert had been destined for the ministry, but at the age of fifteen he dropped this intended career. The arrival of the power loom suddenly threatened James Chambers's cotton business, forcing him to close it down and become a draper. During this time, James began to socialise with a number of French prisoners of war on parole who were stationed in Peebles. Unfortunately, James Chambers lent these exiles a large amount of credit, and when they were abruptly transferred away he was forced to declare bankruptcy. The family moved to Edinburgh in 1813. Robert continued his education at the High School, and William became a bookseller's apprentice. In 1818 Robert, at sixteen years old, began his own business as a bookstall-keeper on Leith Walk. At first, his entire stock consisted of some old books belonging to his father, amounting to thirteen feet of shelf space and worth no more than a few pounds. By the end of the first year the value of his stock went up to twelve pounds, and modest success came gradually.

=== Early works ===
While Robert built up a business, his brother William expanded his own by purchasing a home-made printing press and publishing pamphlets as well as creating his own type. Soon afterwards, Robert and William decided to join forces—with Robert writing and William printing. Their first joint venture was a magazine series called The Kaleidoscope, or Edinburgh Literary Amusement, sold for threepence. This was issued every two weeks between 6 October 1821 and 12 January 1822. It was followed by Illustrations of the Author of Waverley (1822), which offered sketches of individuals believed to have been the inspirations for some of the characters in Walter Scott's works of fiction. The last book to be printed on William's old press was Traditions of Edinburgh (1824), derived from Robert's enthusiastic interest in the history and antiquities of Edinburgh. He followed this with Walks in Edinburgh (1825), Popular Rhymes of Scotland (1826) and Picture of Scotland (1826). This was followed by five volumes of Scottish history to form part of Constable's Miscellany. In 1832 he compiled Gazetteer of Scotland.

These books gained him the approval and personal friendship of Walter Scott. After Scott's death, Robert paid tribute to him by writing a Life of Sir Walter Scott (1832). Robert also wrote a History of the Rebellions in Scotland from 1638 to 1745 (5 vols, 1828) and numerous other works on Scotland and Scottish traditions.

== Marriage ==
On 7 December 1829 Robert married Anne Kirkwood, the only child of Jane and John Kirkwood. Together they had 14 children, three of whom died in infancy. Excluding these three, their children were Robert (Robert Chambers Jr.), Nina (Mrs. Frederick Lehmann, and mother of Rudolf Chambers Lehmann), Mary (Mrs. Alexander Mackenzie Edwards, mother of satirist Bob Edwards), Anne (Mrs. James Muir Dowie, mother of Ménie Muriel Dowie), Janet, Eliza (Mrs. William Overend Priestley), Amelia (Mrs. Rudolf Lehmann), James, William, Phoebe (Mrs. Zeigler), and Alice.

== W. & R. Chambers ==
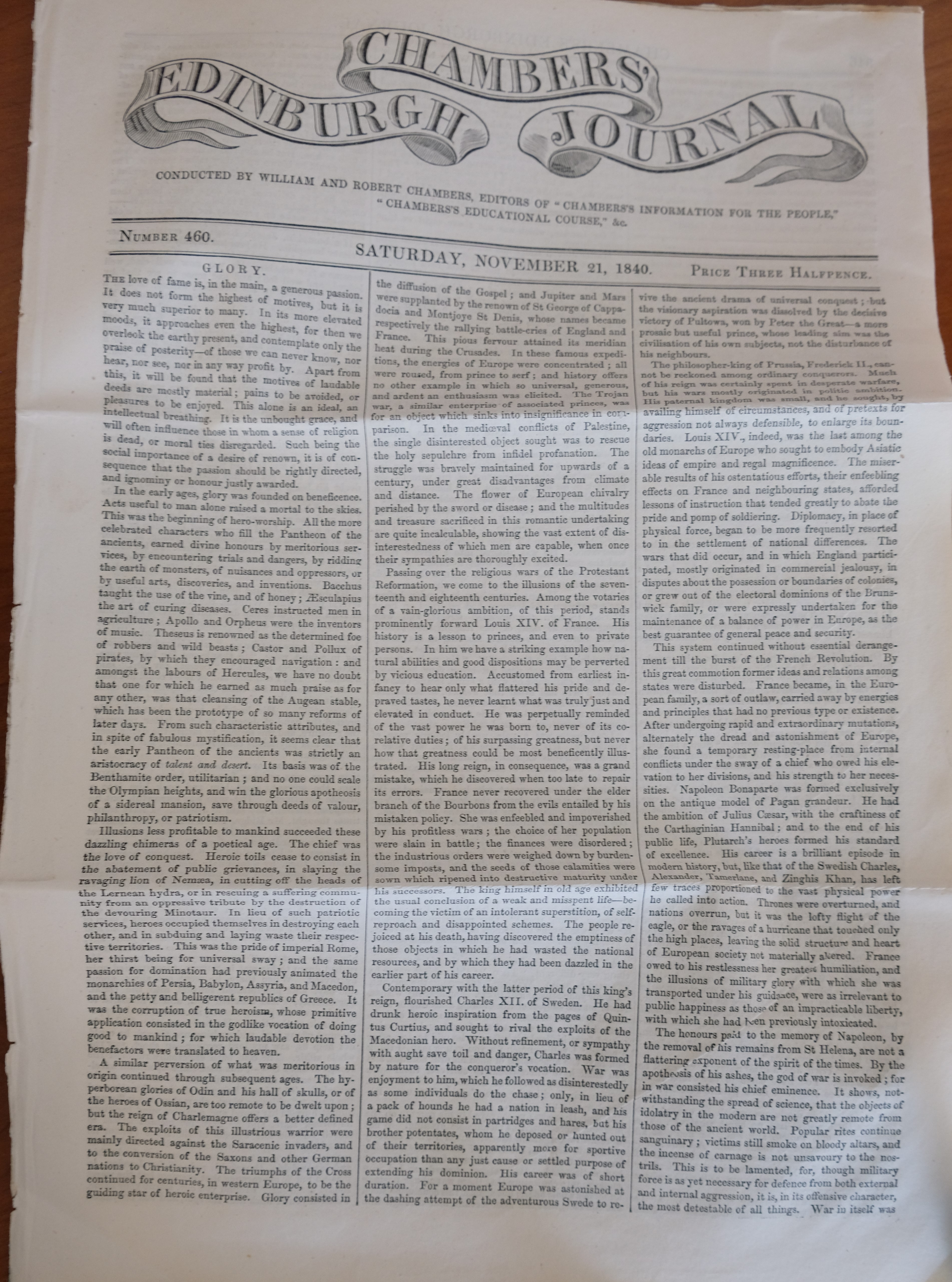
21 November 1840, copy of the Chambers's Edinburgh Journal

At the beginning of 1832 Robert's brother William Chambers started a weekly publication entitled Chambers's Edinburgh Journal, which speedily gained a large circulation. Robert was at first only a contributor, but after 14 volumes had appeared, he became joint editor with his brother, and his collaboration contributed more perhaps than anything else to the success of the Journal. The two brothers eventually united as partners in the book publishing firm of W. & R. Chambers Publishers.

At the same time Robert ran a bookshop and circulating library from 48 Hanover Street with his younger brother, James Chambers. Meanwhile, William ran his shop from 47 Broughton Street. Robert at this time was living close to the shop, at 27 Elder Street (demolished in the 1960s to improve access to Edinburgh Bus Station).

Among the other numerous works of which Robert was in whole or in part the author, the Biographical Dictionary of Eminent Scotsmen (4 vols., Glasgow, 1832–1835), the Cyclopædia of English Literature (1844), the Life and Works of Robert Burns (4 vols., 1851), Ancient Sea Margins (1848), the Domestic Annals of Scotland (1859–1861) and the Book of Days (2 vols., 1862–1864) were the most important.

Chambers's Encyclopaedia (1859–1868), with Dr Andrew Findlater as editor, was carried out under the superintendence of the brothers. The Cyclopædia of English Literature contains a series of extracts from notable authors of every period, "set in a biographical and critical history of the literature itself." For the Life of Burns he made original investigations, gathering many hitherto unrecorded facts from the poet's sister, Mrs Begg, to whose benefit the whole profits of the work were generously devoted.

== Vestiges ==
During the 1830s, Robert Chambers took a particularly keen interest in the then rapidly expanding field of geology, and he was elected a fellow of the Geological Society of London in 1844. Prior to this, he was elected a member of the Royal Society of Edinburgh in 1840, which connected him through correspondence to numerous scientific men. William later recalls that "His mind had become occupied with speculative theories which brought him into communication with Sir Charles Bell, George Combe, his brother Dr. Andrew Combe, Dr. Neil Arnott, Professor Edward Forbes, Dr. Samuel Brown, and other thinkers on physiology and mental philosophy." In 1848 Chambers published his first geological book on Ancient Sea Margins. Later, he toured Scandinavia and Canada for the purpose of geological exploration. The results of his travels were published in Tracings of the North of Europe (1851) and Tracings in Iceland and the Faroe Islands (1856).

However, his most popular book, influenced by his geological studies and interest in speculative theories, was a work to which he never openly attached his name. In 1844, Chambers completed the dictation of his Vestiges of the Natural History of Creation to his wife, Anne Kirkwood, as he recuperated from depression at his holiday home in St Andrews. The composition of Vestiges may have served a therapeutic purpose. Chambers had been an enthusiastic phrenologist in Edinburgh in the 1830s, and the anonymously authored Vestiges became an international bestseller and a powerful public influence, subsequent to Combe's Constitution of Man (1828), and anticipating the publication of Charles Darwin's Origin of Species in 1859. The first edition of Vestiges of the Natural History of Creation was released in 1844 and published anonymously. Literary anonymity was not uncommon at the time, especially in periodical journalism. However, in the science genre, anonymity was especially rare, not least because science writers typically wanted to achieve priority for their findings.

The reason for Chambers's anonymity was clear enough as soon as one began reading the text. The book was arguing for a developmental view of the cosmos combining stellar evolution with progressive transmutation of species in the same spirit as the late Frenchman Jean-Baptiste Lamarck. Lamarck had been discredited among intellectuals by this time, and evolutionary (or development) theories were exceedingly unpopular, except among political radicals, and materialists. Chambers, however, tried to explicitly distance his own theory from that of Lamarck's by denying Lamarck's evolutionary mechanism any plausibility. "Now it is possible that wants and the exercise of faculties have entered in some manner into the production of the phenomena which we have been considering; but certainly not in the way suggested by Lamarck, whose whole notion is obviously so inadequate to account for the rise of the organic kingdoms, that we only can place it with pity among the follies of the wise." Additionally, his work was far more sweeping in scope than any of his predecessors. "The book, as far as I am aware," he writes in his concluding chapter, "is the first attempt to connect the natural sciences in a history of creation."

Robert Chambers was aware of the storm that would probably be raised by his treatment of the subject, and he did not wish to get his and his brother's publishing firm involved in any kind of scandal. The arrangements for publication, therefore, were made through a friend named Alexander Ireland, of Manchester. To further prevent the possibility of any unwanted revelations, Chambers only disclosed his authorship to four people: his wife, his brother William, Ireland, and George Combe's nephew, Robert Cox. All correspondence to and from Chambers passed through Ireland's hands first, and all letters and manuscripts were dutifully transcribed in Mrs. Chambers's hand to prevent the possibility of anyone recognizing Robert's handwriting.

By implying that God might not actively sustain the natural and social hierarchies, the book threatened the social order and provided ammunition to Chartists and revolutionaries. Anglican clergymen and naturalists attacked the book. The geologist Adam Sedgwick predicted "ruin and confusion in such a creed" which, if taken up by the working classes, "will undermine the whole moral and social fabric" bringing "discord and deadly mischief in its train". In contrast, many Quakers and Unitarians liked the book. The Unitarian physiologist William Benjamin Carpenter called it "a very beautiful and a very interesting book", and helped Chambers to correct later editions. Critics thanked God that the author began "in ignorance and presumption", for the revised versions "would have been much more dangerous". Nevertheless, the book caused a sensation and quickly went through a number of new editions. Vestiges brought widespread discussion of evolution out of the streets and gutter presses and into the drawing rooms of respectable men and women.

== Other activities ==
Chambers gave a talk on ancient beaches at the British Association for the Advancement of Science meeting at Oxford in May 1847. An observer named Andrew Crombie Ramsay at the meeting reported that Chambers "pushed his conclusions to a most unwarrantable length and got roughly handled on account of it by Buckland, De la Beche, Sedgwick, Murchison, and Lyell. The last told me afterwards that he did so purposely that [Chambers] might see that reasonings in the style of the author of the Vestiges would not be tolerated among scientific men." On the Sunday Samuel Wilberforce, Bishop of Oxford, used his sermon at St. Mary's Church on "the wrong way of doing science" to deliver a stinging attack obviously aimed at Chambers. The church, "crowded to suffocation" with geologists, astronomers and zoologists, heard jibes about the "half-learned" seduced by the "foul temptation" of speculation looking for a self-sustaining universe in a "mocking spirit of unbelief", showing a failure to understand the "modes of the Creator's acting" or to meet the responsibilities of a gentleman. Chambers denounced this as an attempt to stifle progressive opinion, but others thought he must have gone home "with the feeling of a martyr".

Near the close of autumn 1848, Chambers allowed himself to be brought forward as a candidate for the administrative position of Lord Provost of Edinburgh. The timing was especially poor, with others seeking any means possible to try and discredit his character. His adversaries found the perfect opportunity to do so in the swirling allegations that he was the author of the much reviled Vestiges. William Chambers, in his Memoir of Robert Chambers, still sworn to secrecy despite his brother's recent passing, makes his only mention of Vestiges in connection with this affair: "(Robert) might have been well assured that a rumor to the effect that he was the author of 'Vestiges of the Natural History of Creation' would be used to his disadvantage, and that anything he might say on the subject would be unavailing." Robert withdrew his candidacy in disgust.

In 1851 Chambers was one of a group of writers who joined the publisher John Chapman in reinvigorating the Westminster Review as a flagship of free thought and reform, spreading the ideas of evolutionism.

Robert Chambers was a golfer and was elected an honorary member of the Musselburgh Golf Club (now Royal Musselburgh Golf Club) on 14 September 1833. His son, who followed him into the publishing business, was a renowned player and became Champion Golfer in 1858 as a member of Bruntsfield Links Golfing Society.

== Book of Days ==
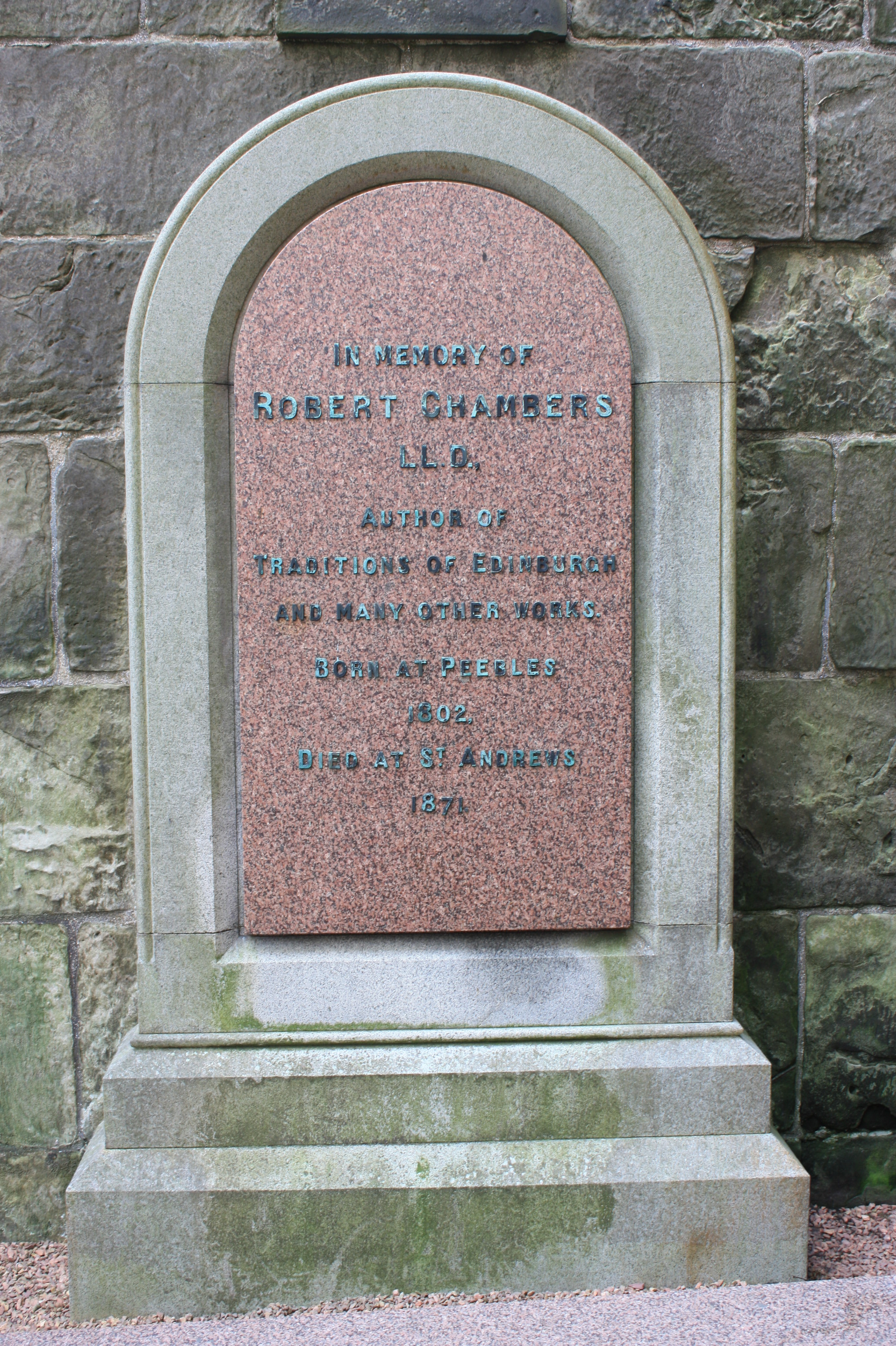
The grave of Robert Chambers, St Andrews Cathedral churchyard

The Book of Days was Chambers's last major publication, and perhaps his most elaborate. It was a miscellany of popular antiquities in connection with the calendar, and it is supposed that his excessive labour in connexion with this book hastened his death. Two years before, the University of St Andrews had conferred on him the degree of Doctor of Laws, and he was elected a member of the Athenaeum Club in London.

== Death ==
Robert Chambers died on 17 March 1871 in St Andrews. He was buried in the Cathedral burial ground in the interior of the old Church of St. Regulus, according to his wishes. The grave lies against the southern wall of the structure attaching the roofless section, east of the tower. A memorial window was also erected to Robert by his brother William in St Giles Cathedral next to a larger window to William himself, placed at the time of his restoration of the cathedral. The pair of windows lie in the northern transept.

A year after Robert's death, his brother William published a biography under the title Memoir of Robert Chambers; With Autobiographical Reminiscences of William Chambers. However, the book did not reveal Robert's authorship of the Vestiges. Milton Millhauser, in his 1959 book Just Before Darwin, wrote the following about William's memoir: "The fraternal Memoir of Robert Chambers might have been an excellent biography had not the author been concerned to keep the Vestiges secret and one or two others. Despite the author's intelligence and sympathy, such omissions inevitably produced a distorted picture" (p. 191, note 7). The book contains some reminiscences by Robert of his early life, with the rest of the narration filled in by William.

Alexander Ireland, in 1884, issued a 12th edition of Vestiges with Robert Chambers finally listed as the author and a preface giving an account of its authorship. Ireland felt that there was no longer any reason for concealing the author's name.

== Works ==
=== Principal writings ===
A collection of Robert Chambers's books is available free at Project Gutenberg.

- The Kaleidoscope, or Edinburgh Literary Amusement. October 1821 – January 1822.
- Illustrations of the Author of Waverley. 1822.
- Traditions of Edinburgh. W. & C. Tait. 1825.
- Notices of the Most Remarkable Fires with have Occurred in Edinburgh. 1825.
- Walks in Edinburgh. 1825.
- Popular Rhymes of Scotland. 1826.
- Picture of Scotland. 1827.
- History of the Rebellion of 1745. 1828.
- Scottish Ballads. 1829.
- Scottish Songs. 1829.
- The Picture of Stirling. 1830.
- Life of King James I. 1830.
- Gazetteer of Scotland (with William Chambers). 1832.
- Scottish Jests and Anecdotes. 1832.
- Life of Sir Walter Scott. 1832.
- History of Scotland. 1832.
- Reekiana, or Minor Antiquities of Edinburgh. 1833.
- Biographical Dictionary of Eminent Scotsmen. 1833–1835.
- Life and Works of Burns (based on Currie's edition). 1834.
- Jacobite Memoirs of the Rebellion. 1834.
- History of the English Language and Literature. 1835.
- Poems. 1835.
- The Land of Burns (with Professor John Wilson). 1840.
- Cyclopaedia of English Literature (with Robert Carruthers). 1840.
- History of the Rebellion of 1745. 1840.
- Vestiges of the Natural History of Creation (published anonymously). 1844.
- Twelve Romantic Scottish Ballads. 1844.
- Explanations: A Sequal (published anonymously). 1845.
- Select Writings of Robert Chambers, in seven volumes. 1847.
- Ancient Sea Margins. 1848.
- Tracings of the North of Europe. 1851.
- Life and Works of Robert Burns. 1851.
- Tracings of Iceland and the Faroe Islands. 1856.
- Domestic Annals of Scotland. 1859–1861.
- Sketch of the History of Edinburgh Theatre Royal. 1859.
- Memoirs of a Banking House, by Sir William Forbes (ed. R. Chambers). 1859.
- Edinburgh Papers. 1861.
- Songs of Scotland Prior to Burns. 1862.
- Preface to Daniel Dunglas Home: Incidents in My Life, first series. 1863.
- The Book of Days. 1864.
- Life of Smollett. 1867.
- Traditions of Edinburgh. 1868.
- The Threiplands of Fingask. 1880.

=== Unpublished manuscripts ===
- Life and Preachings of Jesus Christ, from the Evangelists.
- A Catechism for the Young.
- Private Prayers and Meditations.
- Antiquarian Papers.
- Several papers on spiritualism.

=== Editor and contributor ===
- Chambers's Edinburgh Journal. 1832 ff.
- Chambers's Information for the People. 1833–1835.
- Chambers's Educational Course. 1835 ff.

== Bibliography ==
- This article incorporates text from a publication now in the public domain: Chisholm, Hugh, ed. (1911). "Chambers, Robert". Encyclopædia Britannica. Vol. 5 (11th ed.). Cambridge University Press. pp. 820–821.
- Collison, Robert L.; Preece, Warren E. (2015). Robert Chambers. Encyclopædia Britannica.
- Millhauser, Milton (1959). Just Before Darwin: Robert Chambers and Vestiges. Wesleyan University.
- Waterston, Charles D; Macmillan Shearer, A (2006). Former Fellows of the Royal Society of Edinburgh 1783–2002: Biographical Index (Volume I) (PDF). Edinburgh: Royal Society of Edinburgh. p. 174. ISBN 978-0-902198-84-5. Archived from the original (PDF) on 19 September 2015.
- Layman, C.H., ed. (1990). Man of Letters: The Early Life and love letters of Robert Chambers. Edinburgh University Press. ISBN 978-0-7486-0193-6.
- Macfarlane, Iris; Macfarlane, Alan. The Life of Robert Chambers (rough draft ed.).
- Secord, James A., ed. (1994). Vestiges of the Natural History of Creation and other Evolutionary Writings. Chicago: University of Chicago Press. ISBN 978-0-226-10073-9. (Contains facsimiles of the 1st editions of Vestiges and Explanations)
- Secord, James A. (2001). Victorian Sensation: The Extraordinary Publication, Reception, and Secret Authorship of Vestiges of the Natural History of Creation. Chicago: University of Chicago Press. ISBN 978-0-226-74410-0. Archived from the original on 16 May 2008.

=== Works by Chambers ===
- Chambers, Robert (1844). Vestiges of the Natural History of Creation. London: John Churchill.
- Chambers, Robert (1845). Explanations: A Sequel to "Vestiges of the Natural History of Creation". London: John Churchill.
- Chambers, Robert (1853). Vestiges of the Natural History of Creation, 10th ed. London: John Churchill.
- Chambers, Robert (1860). Vestiges of the Natural History of Creation, 11th ed. London: John Churchill.
- Chambers, William (1872). Memoir of Robert Chambers; With Autobiographical Reminisces of William Chambers. New York City: Scribner, Armstrong & Co.
- Chambers, Robert (1884). Vestiges of the Natural History of Creation, 12th ed. with a preface by Alexander Ireland. Edinburgh: W. & R. Chambers.
