= Collins-Robert French Dictionary =

Collins Robert French Dictionary
- Title page of the 8th Edition
- Author: Beryl T. Atkins, Alain Duval, Rosemary C. Milne, Various other contributors, editorial staff
- Language: English, French
- Subject: Lexicography
- Genre: Bilingual dictionary
- Publisher: HarperCollins, Dictionnaires Le Robert-SEJER
- Publication date: 1978, 1987, 1993, 1995, 1998, 2002, 2005, 2006, 2010, 2016
- Publication place: United Kingdom, France
- Media type: 1 hardback volume
- Pages: 2424 (10th Edition)
- ISBN: 978-0-00-722108-0
- OCLC: 254694348
- Dewey Decimal: 443/.21 22
- LC Class: PC2640 .C69 2006b

The Collins Robert French Dictionary (marketed in France as Le Robert et Collins Dictionnaire) is a bilingual dictionary of English and French derived from the Collins Word Web, an analytical linguistics database. As well as its primary function as a bilingual dictionary, it also contains usage guides for English and French (known as Grammaire Active and Language in Use respectively), English and French verb tables, and maps of English and French speaking areas.

Its two main competitors are Harrap's Shorter French Dictionary, published by Chambers Harrap Publishers, and the Oxford–Hachette French Dictionary, published by Oxford University Press in conjunction with Hachette.

== Publications ==
=== William Collins & Sons releases ===
- Collins-Robert French Dictionary (unabridged)

- 1st edition
- 2nd edition

=== HarperCollins releases ===
- Collins-Robert French Dictionary (unabridged)

- 3rd edition
- 4th edition
- 5th edition
- 6th edition
- 7th edition
- 8th edition
- 9th edition (Collins Robert Complete & Unabridged French Dictionary)

- ISBN 0-00-733155-X/ISBN 978-0-00-733155-0 (HarperCollins Publishers version, hardcover)

- ?th impression (2010-04-29)

- ISBN 978-2-84902-588-8 (Dictionnaires Le Roberts-SEJER version, hardcover)

- 10th edition (Collins Le Robert French Dictionary)

- ISBN 0-00-755652-7/ISBN 978-0-00-755652-6 (hardcover)

- ?th impression (2016-08-25)

- Collins Robert Concise French Dictionary: Paperback version of Collins-Robert French Dictionary with reduced contents, focused on contemporary readers.

- 8th Revised edition

- ISBN 0-00-739362-8/ISBN 978-0-00-739362-6 (hardcover)
- ? impression (2011-07-01)

- Collins French Dictionary and Grammar: Dictionary contents is based on Collins Robert Concise French Dictionary, but with extensive grammar sections.
- Collins French Dictionary and Grammar Essential edition/Collins Essential French Dictionary & Grammar: Collins French Dictionary and Grammar with reduced contents, focused on portability. It includes full coverage of GCSE words.
- Collins French Phrasebook and Dictionary
- Collins French Concise Dictionary: Dictionary contents are printed in 2 colours (black/blue).

- 5th edition

ISBN 0-06-199863-X/ISBN 978-0-06-199863-8
- ? impression (2010-06-15)

- Collins Robert French Dictionary Concise Edition/Collins Le Robert French Dictionary Concise Edition

- ?th edition: Includes 240,000 translations.

ISBN 0-00-811732-2/ISBN 978-0-00-811732-0 (paperback)
- ? impression (2016-06-02)

- Collins Robert French Dictionary (abridged)/Collins Le Robert French-English/English-French Dictionary: This version include smaller contents than the Collins Robert French Dictionary Concise Edition.

- ?th edition

ISBN 0-00-818456-9/ISBN 978-0-00-818456-8
- ? impression (2011-07-01)

==== Collins Gem series ====
- Collins Gem French Dictionary/Collins French Dictionary Gem Edition
- Collins Gem French Verbs
- Collins Gem French Phrasebook and Dictionary/Collins Gem Collins French Phrasebook

==== Collins Easy Learning series ====
- Collins Easy Learning French Verbs and Practice
- Collins Easy Learning French Grammar and Practice
- Collins Easy Learning French Grammar
- Collins Easy Learning French Conversation
- Collins Easy Learning French Dictionary
- Collins Easy Learning French Idioms

=== Dictionnaires Le Robert releases ===
- Le Robert & Collins La référence en anglais Grand Dictionnaire

- ISBN 978-2-321-00902-3 (dictionary only), ISBN 978-2-321-00732-6 (with electronic dictionary, 1-year subscription to new edition of GRAND ROBERT & COLLINS dictionary)

- Dictionnaire Le Grand Robert & Collins/Le Grand Robert & Collins The complete translation tool
- Le Robert & Collins Business
- Le Robert & Collins Business compact
- Le Robert & Collins Collège Anglais
- Le Robert & Collins Compact+ Anglais: Includes electronic dictionary for PC.
- Le Robert & Collins Vocabulaire Anglais et Americain
- Le Robert & Collins la grammaire facile Anglais
- Le Robert & Collins Maxi Anglais:
- Le Robert & Collins Maxi+ Anglais: Includes electronic dictionary for computers.
- Le Robert & Collins Poche Anglais: Includes audio lessons.

- ISBN 978-2-321-00838-5 (paperback)

- Le Robert & Collins Poche+ Anglais: Le Robert & Collins Poche Anglais in hardcover.

- ISBN 978-2-321-00842-2

- Le Robert & Collins Mini Anglais: Includes audio lessons.

- ISBN 978-2-321-00830-9 (paperback)

- Le Robert & Collins Mini+ Anglais: Le Robert & Collins Mini Anglais in hardcover.

- ISBN 978-2-321-00834-7

==== Electronic versions ====
- Le Robert & Collins Le Grand Robert & Collins: Computer-based electronic dictionary.

- ISBN 978-2-321-00938-2 (PC version, 3 activation), ISBN 978-2-321-00936-8 (Mac version, 3 activation), ISBN 978-2-321-00937-5 (PC version, free 10-day trial), ISBN 978-2-84902-604-5 (browser version 3.0, 12-month subscription)

- Le Robert & Collins anglais avancé: Levels B1-B2

- ISBN 978-2-321-00915-3 (PC version, 3 activation)

- Le Robert & Collins anglais essentiel: Levels A2-B1

- ISBN 978-2-321-00744-9 (PC version, 3 activation)

== See also ==
- Collins Spanish Dictionary
