= Chambers's Encyclopaedia =

Encyclopaedia

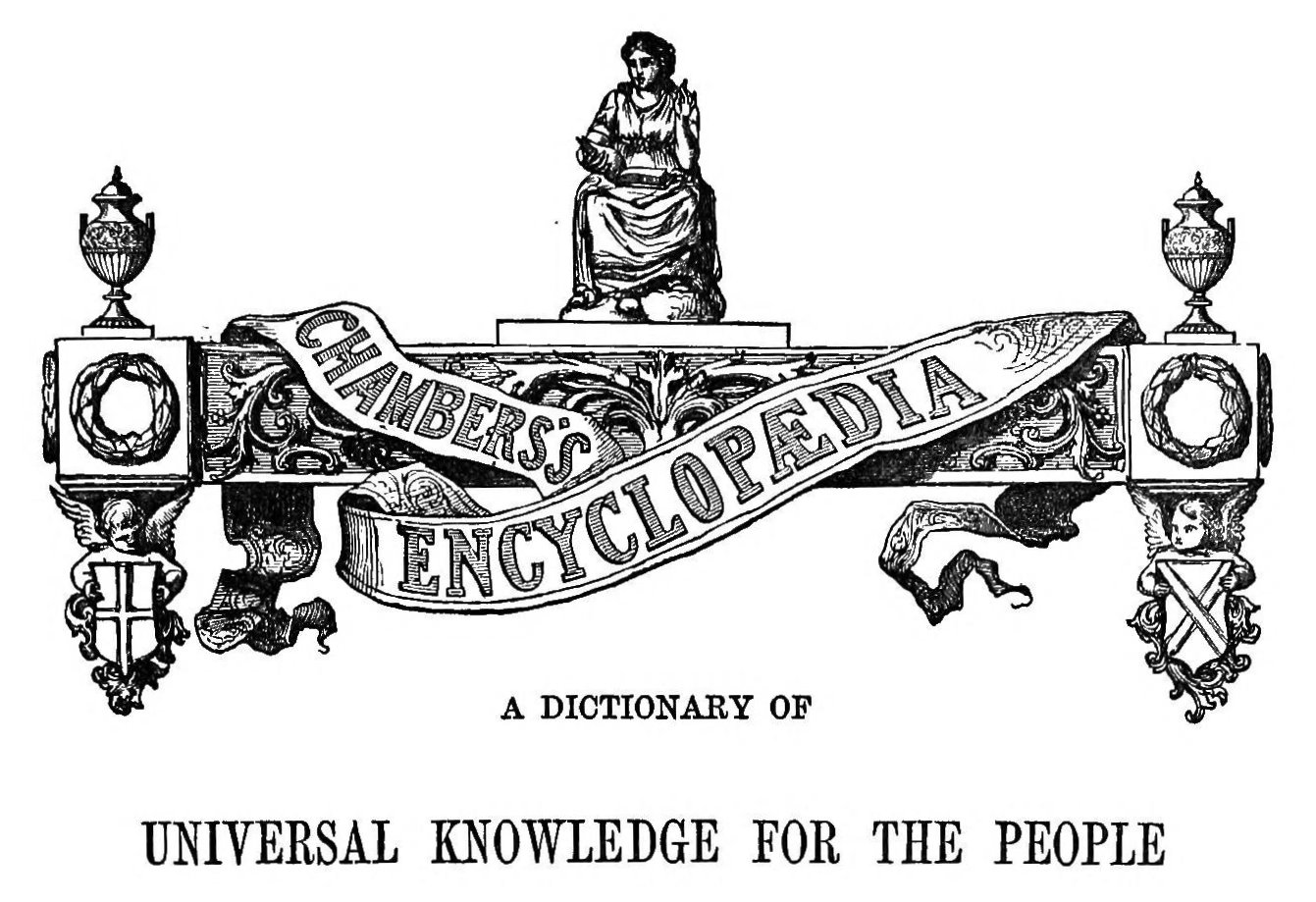
- The design and wording that appeared at the start of each volume of the first edition
- Author: As of 1979, 3,000 named contributors
- Language: British English
- Subject: General
- Published: 1859–1979: 1st through 7th editions (1859–1935): Chambers; 8th through 11th editions (1950–1966): George Newnes Ltd; 12th through 13th editions (1973–1979): Pergamon Press
- Publication date: 1859–1979
- Publication place: United Kingdom
- Pages: 12,600 pages (final edition, 1979)

Chambers's Encyclopaedia was founded in 1859 by William and Robert Chambers of Edinburgh and became one of the most important English language encyclopaedias of the 19th and 20th centuries, developing a reputation for accuracy and scholarliness that was reflected in other works produced by the Chambers publishing company. The encyclopaedia is no longer produced.

== Chambers's Information for the People ==
Before publishing an encyclopaedia, Chambers produced a smaller publication, Chambers's Information for the People. This began as a serial publication in 1835. Like the Penny Cyclopaedia, and others of the time it was meant to be a cheap reference work that was targeted at the middle and working classes. Hence, it focused only on subjects that would be of interest to the common man and pertinent to his self education. It also eschewed the bulky format that and "found it necessary to disregard all common idea as to what constitutes dignity in the externals of books". The undertaking was a success, selling seventy thousand issues in its first year. The original edition consisted of 48 numbered "treatises", plus an unnumbered introductory treatise "An Account of the Earth, Physical and Political". Improved two volume editions were published in 1842 and 1848. A third improved edition appeared in 1857, shortly before the Chambers Brothers publication of the first edition of their major encyclopaedia in 1860. Further new, two volume editions were published in 1875 and 1884, both of which are denominated the Fifth edition.

Congruently with this a second series of editions were published in Philadelphia by a succession of publishers including J. B. Lippincott. The 1848 edition is stated to be the first American edition, while the 1856 ed. is claimed to be the 15th. Further American editions were published up to 1867.

== First edition ==
The first edition, entitled Chambers's Encyclopaedia A Dictionary of Universal Knowledge for the People, was partly based on a translation into English of the 10th edition of the German-language Konversations-Lexikon, which would become the Brockhaus Enzyklopädie.

The publishers found it necessary, however, to supplement the core text with a significant amount of additional material, including more than 4000 illustrations not present in Brockhaus. Andrew Findlater was the acting editor and spent ten years on the project.

The work appeared between 1859 and 1868 in 520 weekly parts at three-halfpence each and totalled ten octavo volumes, with 8,320 pages, and over 27,000 articles from over 100 authors. Over 250 authors were traced by Professor Cooney in 1999. Volume 10 included a supplement of 409 pages at the back for new and revised content. A revised edition appeared in 1874. The index of matters not having special articles contained about 1,500 headings. The articles were generally considered excellent, especially on Jewish literature, folklore, and practical science. As in Brockhaus, however, the scope of the work did not allow extended treatment.

== Later editions ==
An entirely new edition was published 1888–1892 in ten volumes edited by David Patrick. In this edition, the majority of the articles were rewritten and the articles on American matters were written mainly by Americans and an edition published there by Messrs. Lippincott of Philadelphia so that Lippincott and Chambers could claim relevant copyright in their respective countries. This second edition had about 800 fewer illustrations than the first edition, although other visual features, such as tables and fold-out maps increased.

Further new editions followed in the 1890s, 1901, 1908, the 1920s and 1935. This last edition was also issued as a special British Universities Encyclopedia. Each of these kept the 10 volume format. Patrick wrote the preface for the 1901 and 1908 editions and was listed as the editor in the 1920s and 1935 editions, despite having died in 1914. These were actually edited by William Geddie (1877–1967).

In the United States a version of Chambers was published in 1880 as the Library of Universal Knowledge. This began the process of creating The New International Encyclopedia family of encyclopaedias.

== Newnes era ==
In 1944 the licence to Chambers's Encyclopaedia was acquired by George Newnes Ltd, which had been publishing one-volume reference works for about a decade. In 1950, Chambers's Encyclopaedia. New Edition was published in fifteen volumes with great fanfare. While being international in scope, it has been described by Encyclopædia Britannica as British in orientation and conservative in approach with largely British contributors. Managing editor Margret D. Law called it a completely new work with an historic name and noted in the preface that the encyclopaedia "is primarily a British production and therefore no doubt reflects to some extent the intellectual atmosphere of post-war Britain. This implies belief in international co-operation rather than nationalistic isolationism, and in freedom of speech, and worship, information and association rather than in any totalitarian conception". The publication was celebrated at a luncheon at Grocers' Hall attended by over one hundred contributors and chaired by Sir Frank Newnes. The encyclopaedia, which had taken six years to prepare, had cost £500,000 and included the work of over 2,300 authors. Lord Jowitt, the Lord Chancellor, gave the toast and described the endeavour as "outstanding proof" of British scholarship, while Mrs Law commented that she believed the work to be the first major encyclopaedia to be published in Britain since before the First World War.

Subsequent reports from the publishers, Newnes, confirmed that the work was a great success, with sales requiring regular reprinting; this allowed for considerable revision of the work. By the 1961 revised edition, several million words had been revised or replaced and over half the total pages had been reset or changed in some way. The encyclopaedia was regarded as such a scholarly achievement that Mrs Law was made an OBE for her efforts. She retired in 1963.

Unlike other encyclopaedias of the time, Chambers's Encyclopaedia forwent annual revision and attempted to publish new editions at roughly five-year intervals. A new edition was published in 1955 and another at the turn of the next decade.

== Pergamon era ==
The Encyclopaedia was acquired by Pergamon Press in 1966, the same year as the next edition was published. Despite its publication date, information within the set was not up to date beyond 1963. A revised printing was made in 1973 and the encyclopaedia went out of print in 1979. The final edition included 12,600 pages, 28,000 articles, and 14.5 million words. The articles averaged slightly more than 500 words, or half a page, each. There were 4,500 illustrations, mostly in black and white and 416 maps. 3,000 contributors were listed in the final volume and all but the briefest articles were signed. There were 10,000 cross references and an index of 225,000 entries.

== See also ==
- Chambers Dictionary
- Chambers Harrap
- Robert Chambers
- William Chambers
