= William Chambers (publisher) =

Scottish publisher and politician

The Right Honourable William Chambers of Glenormiston FRSE
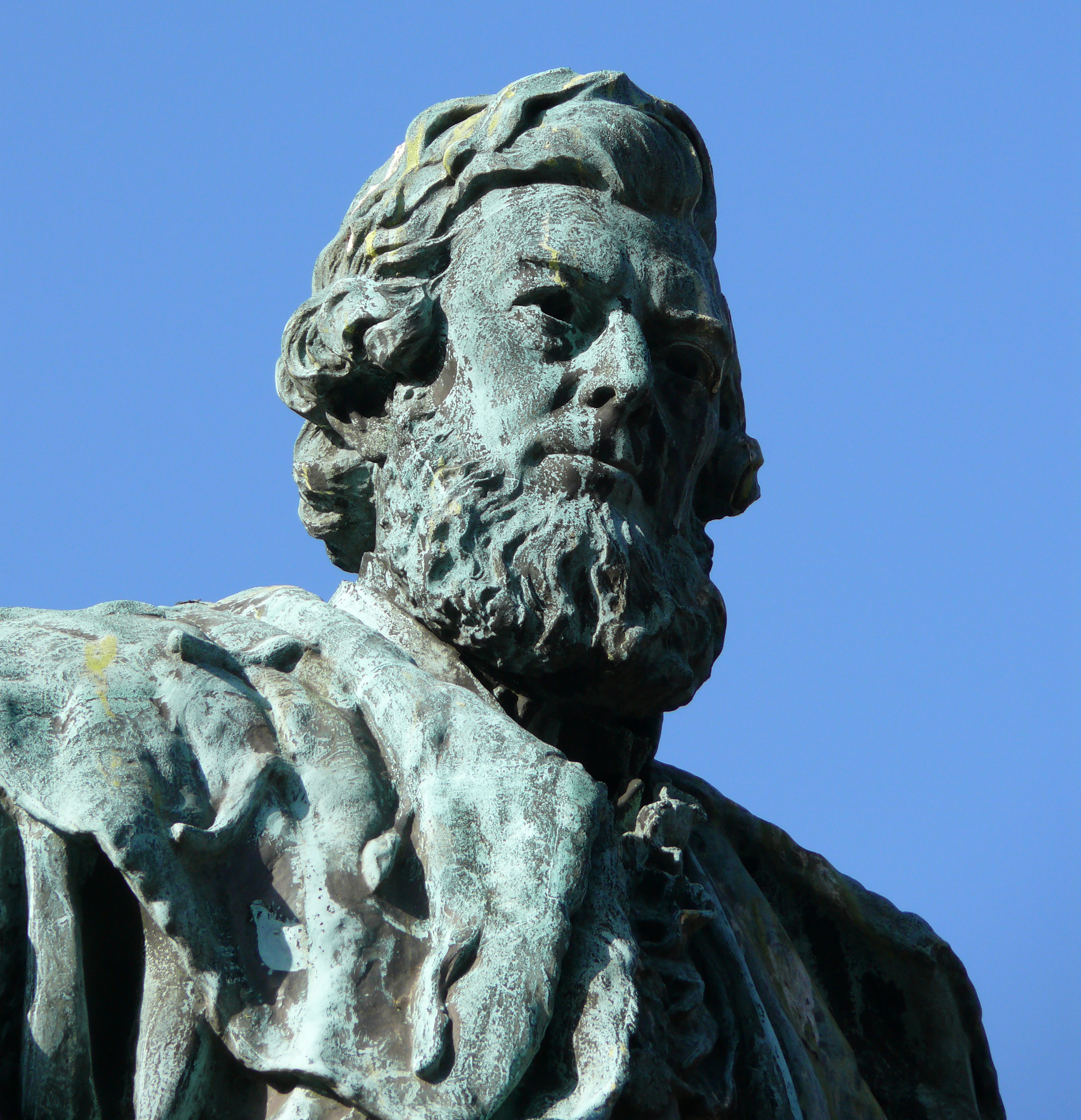
- Statue erected in memory of William Chambers of Glenormiston. It faces the National Museum of Scotland in Chambers Street, Edinburgh.

Lord Provost of Edinburgh
- In office 1865–1869
- Monarch: Queen Victoria
- Preceded by: Charles Lawson of Borthwick Hall
- Succeeded by: William Law

Personal details
- Born: 16 April 1800 Peebles, Scotland
- Died: 20 May 1883 (aged 83) Edinburgh, Scotland
- Relatives: Robert Chambers (brother)

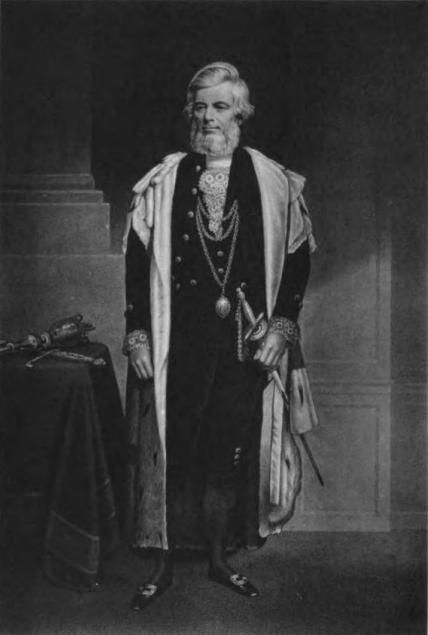
William Chambers, Lord Provost of Edinburgh

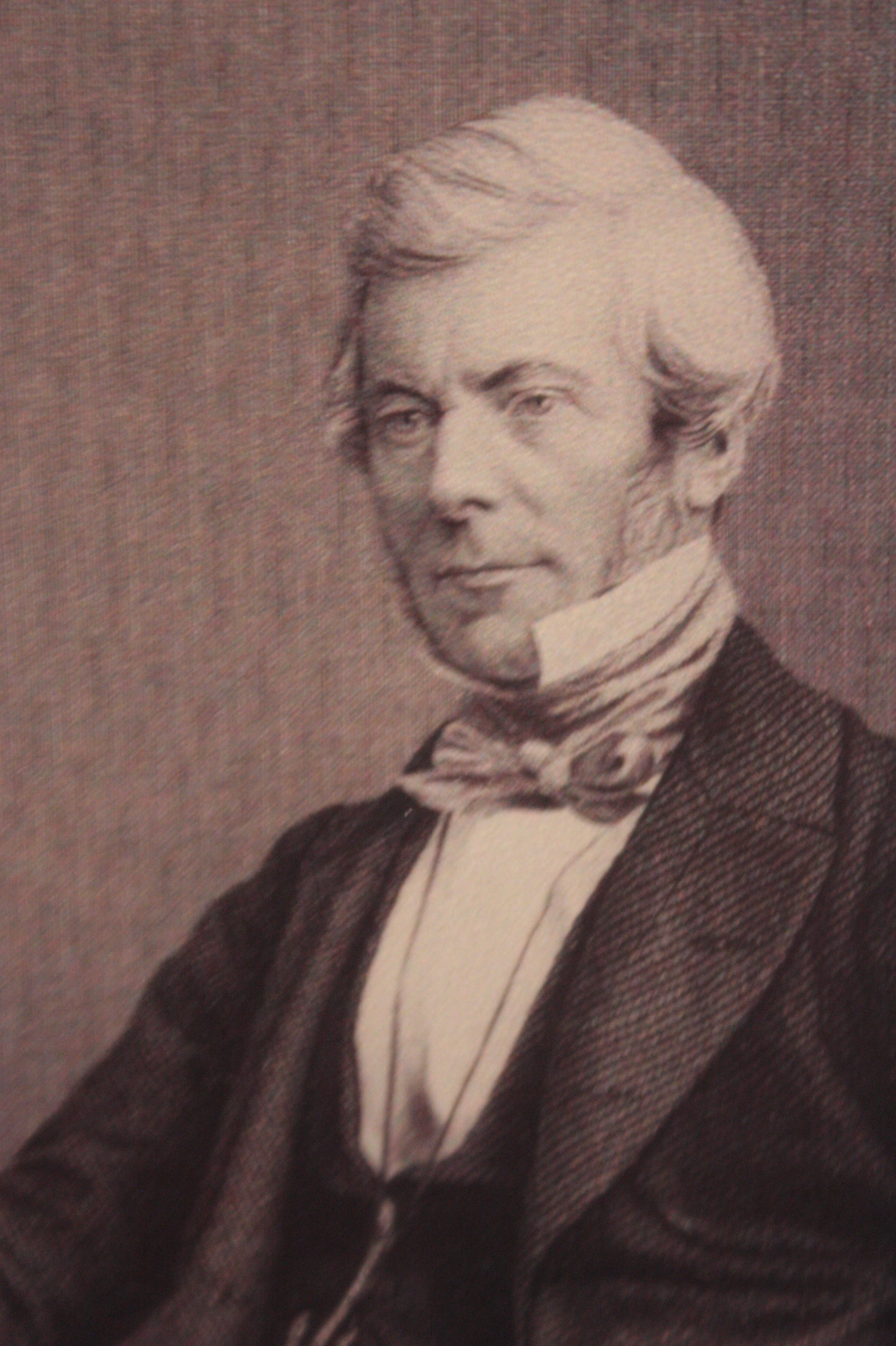
Engraving of William Chambers, c. 1845

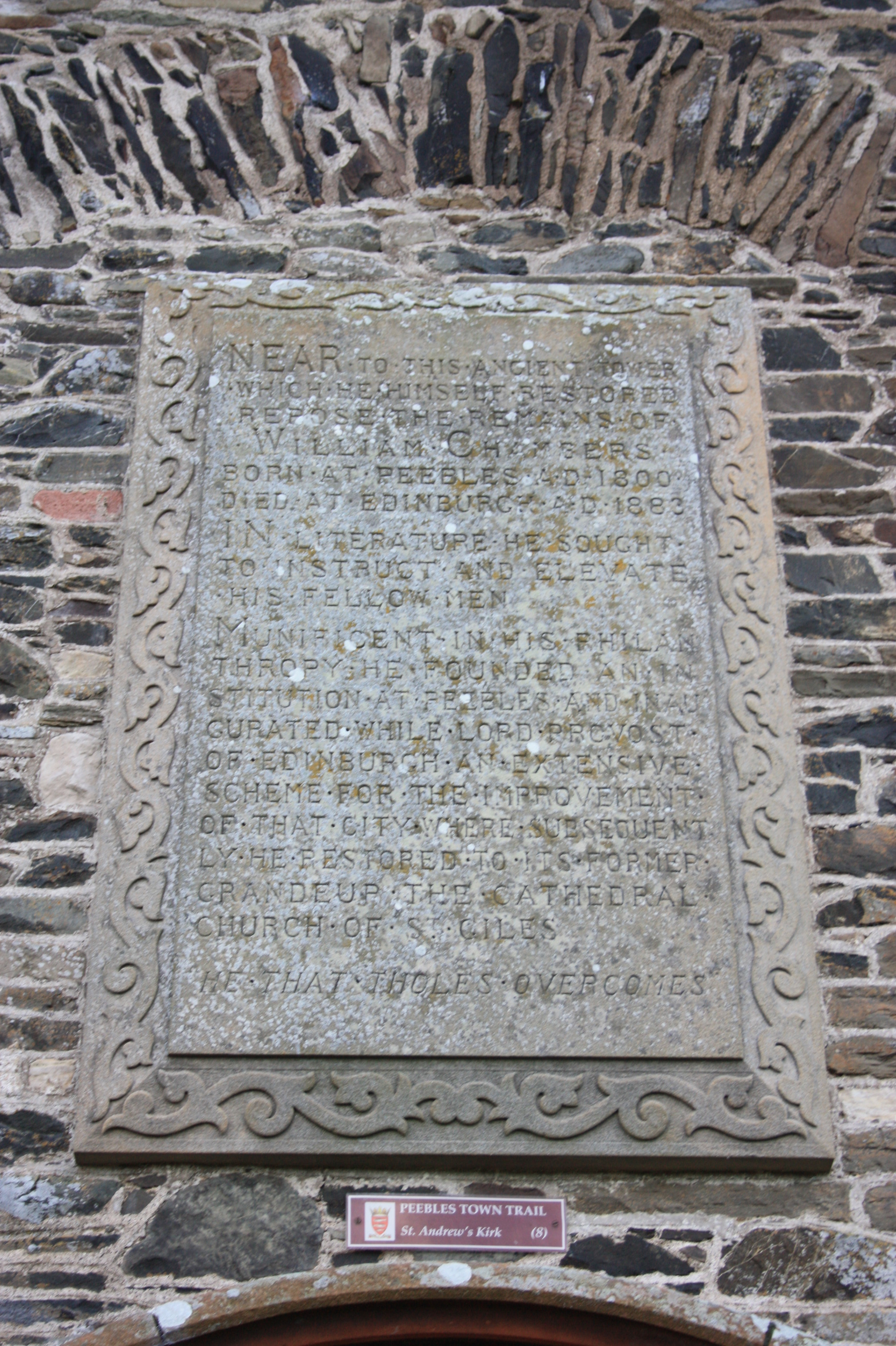
Memorial to William Chambers, Peebles Cemetery

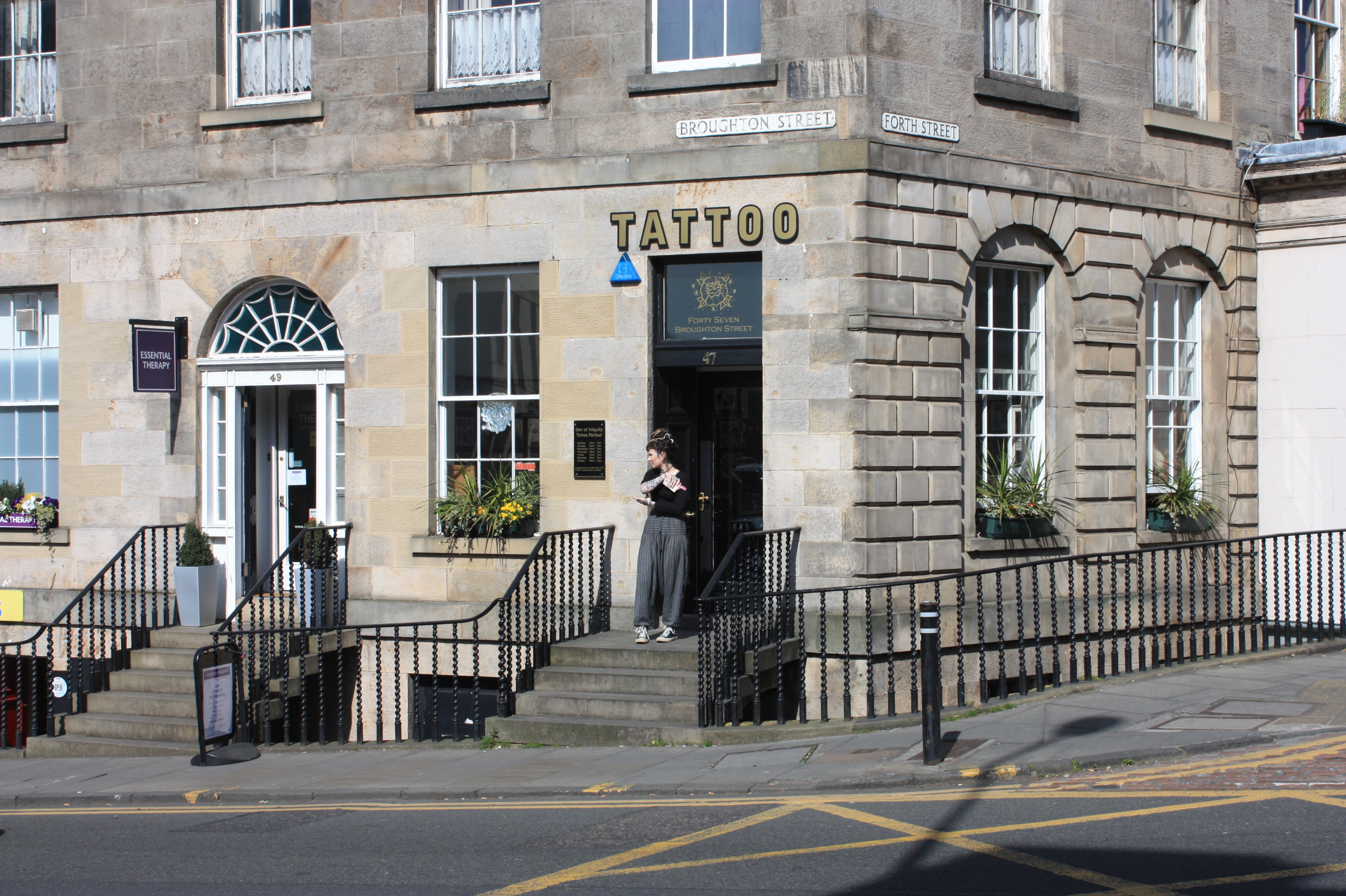
47 Broughton Street, Edinburgh – formerly William Chambers' bookshop

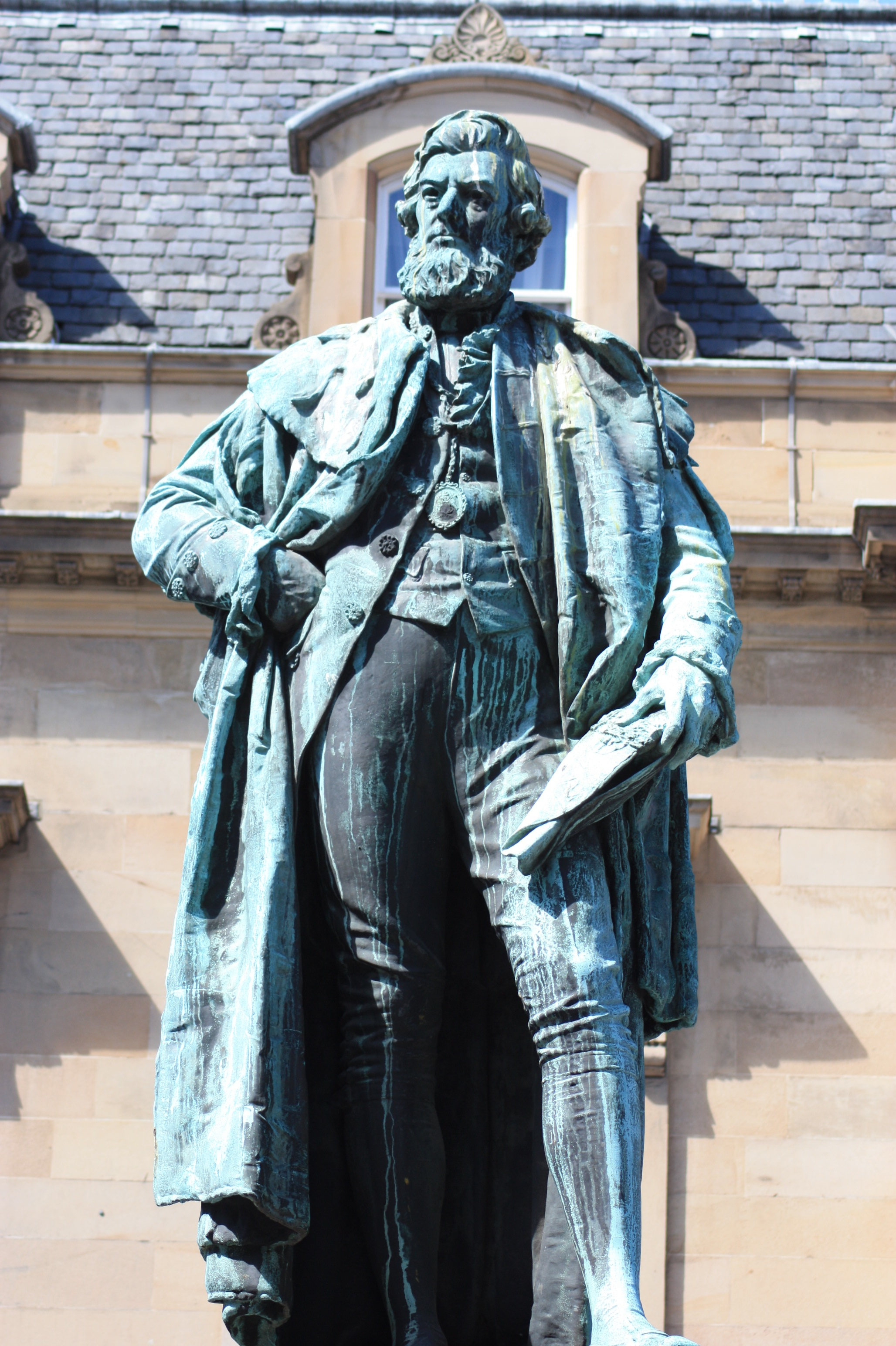
John Rhind's statue of William Chambers on Chambers St, Edinburgh

William Chambers of Glenormiston (/ˈtʃeɪmbərz/; 16 April 1800 – 20 May 1883) was a Scottish publisher and politician, the brother (and business partner) of Robert Chambers. The brothers were influential in the mid-19th century, in both scientific and political circles.

== Biography ==
Chambers was born in Peebles the son of James Chambers, a cotton mill owner, and his wife, Jean Gibson. William was educated locally, but well, being trained in the Classics.

The family moved to Edinburgh in 1814 to work in the book-selling trade. William was apprenticed to a John Sutherland, a bookseller with a circulating library based at 9 Calton Street at the base of Calton Hill. William was paid 4/- per week, from which he paid 1/6 per week for lodgings at Boak's Land off the West Port at the west end of the Grassmarket.

William opened his own bookshop in 1819 on Broughton Street, an ancient sloping and winding street absorbed by Edinburgh's New Town. In 1820 he began printing his own works. In 1832 he founded the publishing firm of W. & R. Chambers Publishers with his younger brother Robert. They were keen advocates of popular education and his firm pioneered the use of industrial technologies within publishing to make books and newspapers available cheaply. They produced books and periodicals of Scottish interest, such as Gazetteer of Scotland. They also made money in promulgating the many new science discoveries as the modern world emerged from prior modes of thinking in such periodicals as the Edinburgh Journal.

Their publishing business prospered, and in 1846 William purchased the Glenormiston estate (near Peebles) from William Steuart. This house had been built by William Hunter in 1805. Chambers remodelled it in 1849, also adding many murals to the interior. In 1859 Chambers founded a museum and art gallery in Peebles. The brothers collaborated on the publication of Chambers Encyclopaedia between 1860 and 1868. The Chambers Dictionary in 1872 was one of the first generally affordable dictionaries, allowing its use as a standard school text book.

William was elected a Fellow of the Royal Society of Edinburgh in 1860, his proposer was John Shank More. His address was then given as 13 Chester Street, a large townhouse in Edinburgh's west end.

As Lord Provost of Edinburgh from 1865 to 1869, Chambers was responsible for instructing the restoration of St Giles Cathedral and other major town planning exercises, including the creation of Jeffrey Street, St Marys Street and Blackfriars Street. These streets were all created under the Edinburgh Improvement Act 1867 (30 & 31 Vict. c. xliv), including one named in his memory: Chambers Street.

In 1868 he built a new printworks immediately west of the City Chambers (demolished in the 1930s).

In 1872 Edinburgh University awarded Chambers an honorary doctorate (LLD).

Chambers died at home at 13 Chester Street in Edinburgh's West End on 20 May 1883 and was buried in the family plot in Peebles Cemetery. His memorial is placed on the eastern flank of the central tower.

His house at Glenormiston was demolished in the 1950s.

== Greyfriars Bobby ==
In 1867, in his capacity as Lord Provost of Edinburgh, William Chambers (who was also a director of the Scottish Society for the Prevention of Cruelty to Animals), granted a dog licence to Greyfriars Bobby, paying for the licence and for a customised dog collar, now in the Museum of Edinburgh, himself.

== Memorials ==
In 1891 a statue of Chambers, by local sculptor John Rhind was placed in the centre of Chambers Street. This has low-relief copper panels on the base by William Shirreffs. The statue was relocated in 2020 as part of a relandscaping exercise on Chambers Street, increasing paved area outside the National Museum of Scotland.

== W. & R. Chambers ==
In the beginning of 1832 William Chambers started a weekly publication under the title of Chambers's Edinburgh Journal, (known since 1854 as Chambers's Journal of Literature, Science and Arts), which speedily attained a large circulation (84,000), and to which his younger brother Robert Chambers was at first only a contributor. After fourteen issues had appeared, Robert became associated with his brother as joint editor, and his collaboration may have contributed more than anything else to the success of the Journal. From September 1832 the two brothers formed the book publishing firm of W. & R. Chambers Publishers. This was originally located at 19 Waterloo Place at the east end of Princes Street.

In the mid-19th century they moved to a large premises at 339 High Street on the Royal Mile. It lay between Warriston Close and Roxburgh Close. Their premises was acquired in the 1930s by the City Chambers to build an extension to the chambers.

The firm would eventually become part of Chambers Harrap Publishers in the late 20th century.

Among the other numerous works of which Robert was in whole or in part the author, the Biographical Dictionary of Eminent Scotsmen (4 vols., Glasgow, 1832–1835), the Cyclopædia of English Literature (1844), the Life and Works of Robert Burns (4 vols., 1851), Ancient Sea Margins (1848), the Domestic Annals of Scotland (1859–1861) and the Book of Days (2 vols., 1862–1864) were the most important.

== In culture ==
He was played by Christopher Lee in the 2005 feature film The Adventures of Greyfriars Bobby.

== Publications ==
- Chamber’s Miscellany of Useful and Entertaining Tracts (20 vols., 10 tomes, 1844-1847)
- Chambers's Papers for the People Vol. 1 (1850).
- A history of Peeblesshire. (1864). archive.org
- Chambers's etymological dictionary of the English language. (1871) archive.org
- Chambers Dictionary (1872)
- Memoir of William and Robert Chambers. (1883). archive.org

== Family ==
In 1833 he was married to Harriet Seddon Clark.

== See also ==
- Chambers Harrap Publishers
- Chambers Institution, Peebles, Scottish Borders, an arts centre, museum and library which bears W. Chambers' name.
