= Harrap's Shorter French Dictionary =

Harrap's Shorter French Dictionary, published by Chambers Harrap Publishers, is one of the best known English/French bilingual dictionaries in the United Kingdom and France. The eighth edition was published in April 2007. In the United States it is sold under the title Harrap's French and English College Dictionary.

The Shorter is a single-volume dictionary which began life as an abridged version of Harrap's French Standard Dictionary (now Harrap's Unabridged French Dictionary, now online at Harrap's Online, sold in two volumes and last revised in March 2007). The French version was last sold as Harrap's Unabridged, before it was resold by Edition Larousse.

The first edition of the Shorter was published in two volumes, the French-English book in 1940 and the English-French four years later. Revised editions were published in 1967, 1982, 1991, 1996, 2000, 2004, and 2007. In 2009 a new edition was published under the title Chambers French Dictionary.

Rival works include the Collins-Robert French Dictionary and the Oxford–Hachette French Dictionary.

== Publications ==
=== Harrap's Shorter le dictionnaire d'Anglais ===
- ?th edition: Includes 1,000,000 words, expressions, translations; 42-page study notes, 500 idiomatic expressions illustrated in colour and classified by theme.

- Editions Larousse edition (ISBN 2-81870495-2/ISBN 978-2-81870495-0)

- 1st impression (2016-06-15)

== See also ==
- Chambers Harrap
