= Chambers's Edinburgh Journal =

Defunct weekly magazine

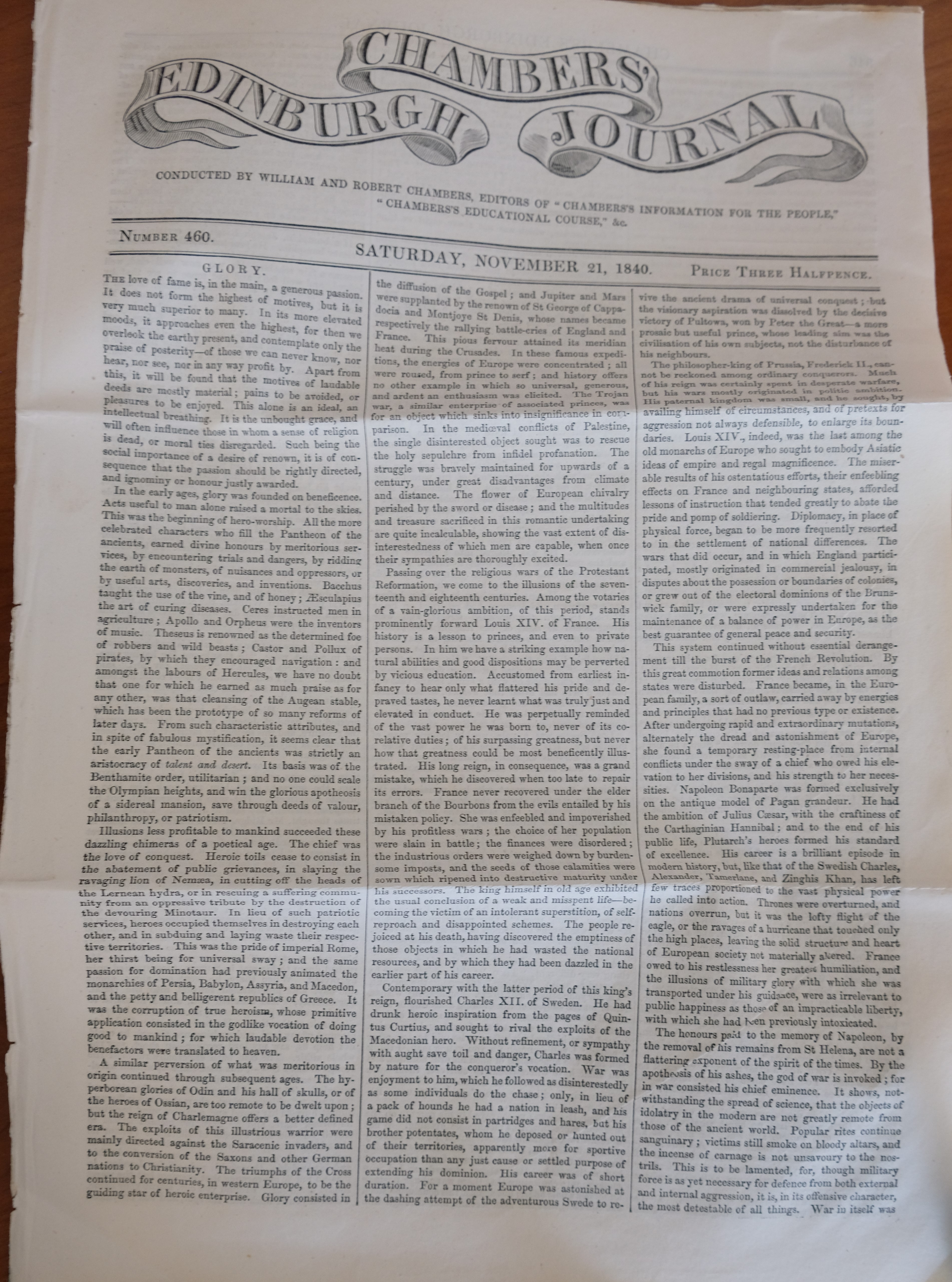
- 21 November, 1840, copy of the Chambers' Edinburgh Journal
- Frequency: Weekly
- Founder: William Chambers
- First issue: 1832; 194 years ago
- Final issue: 1956
- Company: W. & R. Chambers Publishers
- Based in: London, UK

Chambers's Edinburgh Journal was a weekly 16-page magazine started by William Chambers in 1832. The first edition was dated 4 February 1832, and priced at one penny. Topics included history, religion, language, and science. William was soon joined as joint editor by his brother Robert, who wrote many of the articles for the early issues, and within a few years the journal had a circulation of 84,000. From 1847 to 1849, it was edited by William Henry Wills. In 1854 the title was changed to Chambers's Journal of Popular Literature, Science, and Art, and changed again to Chambers's Journal at the end of 1897.

The journal was produced in Edinburgh until the late 1850s, by which time the author James Payn had taken over as editor, and production was moved to London. Serialised fiction from major authors, including Payn himself, became one of the journal's major attractions following his arrival. Among its long-standing contributors was Camilla Dufour Crosland up to her death in 1895.

The journal continued to be published until 1956, when it ceased publication.
