= Chambers (publisher) =

Scottish reference publisher

- Company type: Subsidiary
- Industry: Publishing
- Genre: Reference
- Predecessor: W. R. Chambers Publishers
- Founded: First publication in 1819
- Headquarters: London, United Kingdom
- Parent: John Murray
- Website: chambers.co.uk

Chambers is a reference publisher based in London (formerly Edinburgh, Scotland). It held the property rights of W. & R. Chambers Publishers.

== History of Chambers ==
Chambers was founded as W. & R. Chambers Publishers by the two brothers William Chambers of Glenormiston and Robert Chambers. They were born into a rich, mill-owning family in Peebles in Scotland in 1800 and 1802 respectively, during the time of the war with France. The war impoverished the family and, in 1813, the family left Peebles for Edinburgh. While Robert remained at home to finish his education, William was forced to find work to support his parents. He was a keen reader and would get up early in the morning to read by the dawn light because he was too poor to buy candles. He was apprenticed to a bookseller, at the sum of 4 shillings a week. Robert, also an avid reader, could not go to university when he finished school because his parents could not afford to pay. He too moved to Edinburgh, rented a one-roomed shop in Leith Walk, and set himself up as a bookseller when he was just 16 years old. William's apprenticeship came to an end when he turned 18 and he joined Robert working in the shop.

Although they had had a modest beginning, the brothers began to do well. They had no training in printing and binding but together they printed, bound and published 750 copies of The Songs of Robert Burns in around 1819. This was the nearest thing to a guaranteed best-seller in 19th-century Edinburgh, and brought further profits and some fame.

In 1824, Robert wrote, and the brothers published, Traditions of Edinburgh. Education was always the main priority for William and Robert. In 1832, they published Chambers's Edinburgh Journal, a weekly newspaper containing articles on subjects such as history, religion, language and science, many of which were written by Robert himself. It was an immediate success and within a few years the weekly circulation had risen to 84,000 copies. This put an end to their struggle to survive although they still had to work hard.

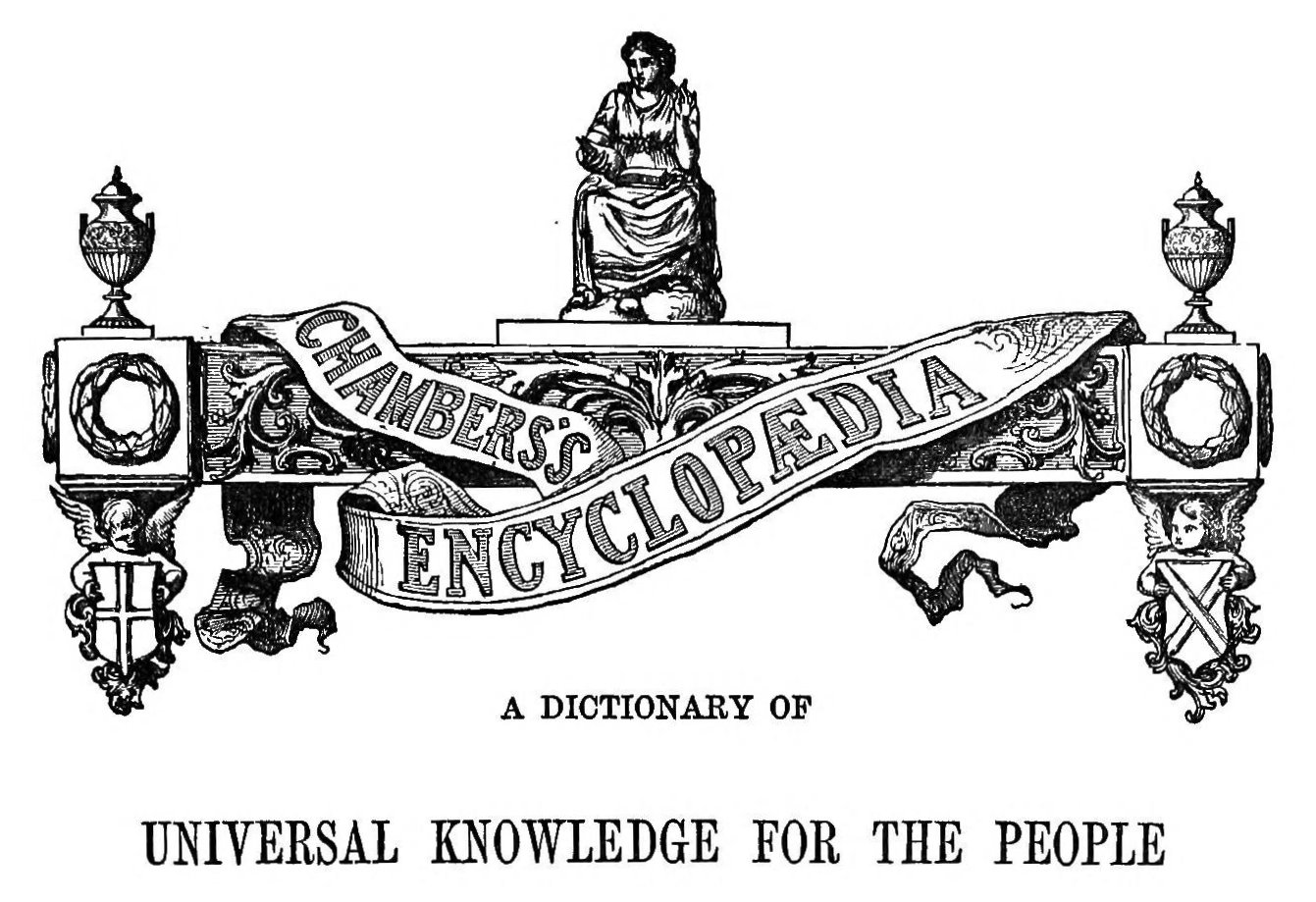
The design and wording that appeared at the start of each volume of the Chambers's Encyclopaedia.

Between 1859 and 1868 they published their most important work to date, the renowned Chambers's Encyclopaedia (no longer published), in 520 weekly parts at three-halfpence each. The first edition was based on a translation into English of the 10th edition of the German-language Konversations-Lexikon, which became the Brockhaus Enzyklopädie. This went through several further editions, reaching a high point of quality with the 1950 edition published in 15 volumes by George Newnes, which took six years to prepare, cost £500,000 and included the work of over 2,300 authors. The work was lauded by the then Lord Chancellor, Lord Jowitt, as "outstanding proof" of British scholarship, while the managing editor, M. D. Law, commented that she believed the work to be the first major encyclopaedia to be published in Britain since before the First World War. The encyclopaedia was regarded as such a scholarly achievement that Law received the O.B.E. for her efforts.

Chambers also published an extensive list of language and reference titles, covering English-language dictionaries, thesauruses, bilingual dictionaries, and specialist titles on subjects such as biography, quotations, literary characters, science and technology and world history.

In 1989, Chambers was acquired by Groupe de La Cite, part of CEP. Chambers purchased the formerly independent George G. Harrap and Co. in 1992. Harrap mainly publishes bilingual dictionaries, for instance Harrap's Shorter French Dictionary. The Harrap list also includes study aids, slang dictionaries, phrasebooks and business dictionaries. In the UK, Harrap publishes bilingual titles in French, Spanish, Portuguese, Italian, German and Polish.

Havas acquired CEP in 1997; Havas was then acquired by Vivendi in 1998. Vivendi sold its European book publishing to Lagardère Group in 2002.

At the end of 2009, the parent company shut the Edinburgh premises of Chambers Harrap Publishers. The Chambers imprint was managed from London by Hodder Education, while Harrap titles were moved to Larousse in Paris. Chambers was moved to the John Murray division of Hodder in 2013.

A subsidiary, Allied Chambers, publishes the titles for the market in and around India.

== Current publications ==
Chambers Harrap Publishers is best known for its flagship title, The Chambers Dictionary, which contains more words and definitions than any other single-volume dictionary and is known for its occasionally humorous definitions. The Chambers list is currently split into the following areas:

- Dictionaries
- Thesauruses
- Language Reference
- Subject Reference
- School Range
- Crosswords
- Puzzles
- Games
- Phrasebooks
- Adult Learners' Range

== Slang ==
At the end of 2007 Chambers Harrap Publishers acquired the rights to publish the renowned British slang lexicographer Jonathon Green's Slang Dictionary as Chambers Slang Dictionary, originally published by Cassell of the Orion Publishing Group. This new edition was published in October 2008.

== Brewer's ==
On 1 January 2008, Chambers Harrap Publishers acquired the Brewer's list from Orion Publishing Group, including the famous Brewer's Dictionary of Phrase and Fable.

== See also ==
- For other history and founders:
  - William Chambers and Robert Chambers
  - George G. Harrap and Co.
- The Chambers Dictionary
- Chambers's Edinburgh Journal
- Chambers's Encyclopaedia
- Harrap's Shorter French Dictionary
- E. Cobham Brewer
