= 1782 in science =

The year 1782 in science and technology included many events, some of which are listed here.

== Aviation ==
- December 14 – The Montgolfier brothers first test fly a hot air balloon; it floats nearly 2 km (1.2 mi).

== Biology ==
- Jesuit abbot Juan Ignacio Molina publishes Saggio sulla Storia Naturale del Chili in Spain, the first account of the natural history of his native Chile, describing many species to science for the first time (e.g., Araucaria araucana).

== Chemistry ==
- Telluride minerals are first discovered in a gold mine in Kleinschlatten, Transylvania (modern-day Zlatna, Romania) by Austrian mineralogist Franz-Joseph Müller von Reichenstein.
- Winter 1782–83 – Antoine Lavoisier and Pierre-Simon Laplace begin to use the world's first ice calorimeter to determine the heat evolved in various chemical changes (calculations based on Joseph Black's prior discovery of latent heat), marking the foundation of thermochemistry.

== Medicine ==
- May – First patient admitted to Montrose Lunatic Asylum, the first such institution to be founded in Scotland, largely due to Susan Carnegie of Charleton.
- September – Nottingham General Hospital opens to patients in England.

== Physics ==
- Jean-Paul Marat publishes Recherches physiques sur l'électricité (Research into the Physics of Electricity)
- Giordano Riccati publishes experiments determining what will later be known as Young's modulus.

== Technology ==
- John Arnold patents his improvements in the construction of marine chronometers in Britain.

== Institutions ==
- Princess Yekaterina Vorontsova-Dashkova is appointed Director of the Imperial Academy of Arts and Sciences in Saint Petersburg.

== Awards ==
- Copley Medal: Richard Kirwan

== Births ==
- April 7 – Marie-Anne Libert, Belgian botanist (died 1865)
- June 3 – Charles Waterton, English naturalist and explorer (died 1865)
- June 16 – Olry Terquem, French Jewish geometer (died 1862)

== Deaths ==
- January 18 – Sir John Pringle, Scottish-born physician (born 1707)
- March 17 – Daniel Bernoulli, Dutch-Swiss mathematician (born 1700)
- April 15 – Elisabeth Christina von Linné, Swedish botanist (born 1743)
- May 6 – Christine Kirch, German astronomer (born 1696)
- May 16 – Daniel Solander, Swedish-born botanist (born 1733)
- May 20 – William Emerson, English mathematician (born 1701)
