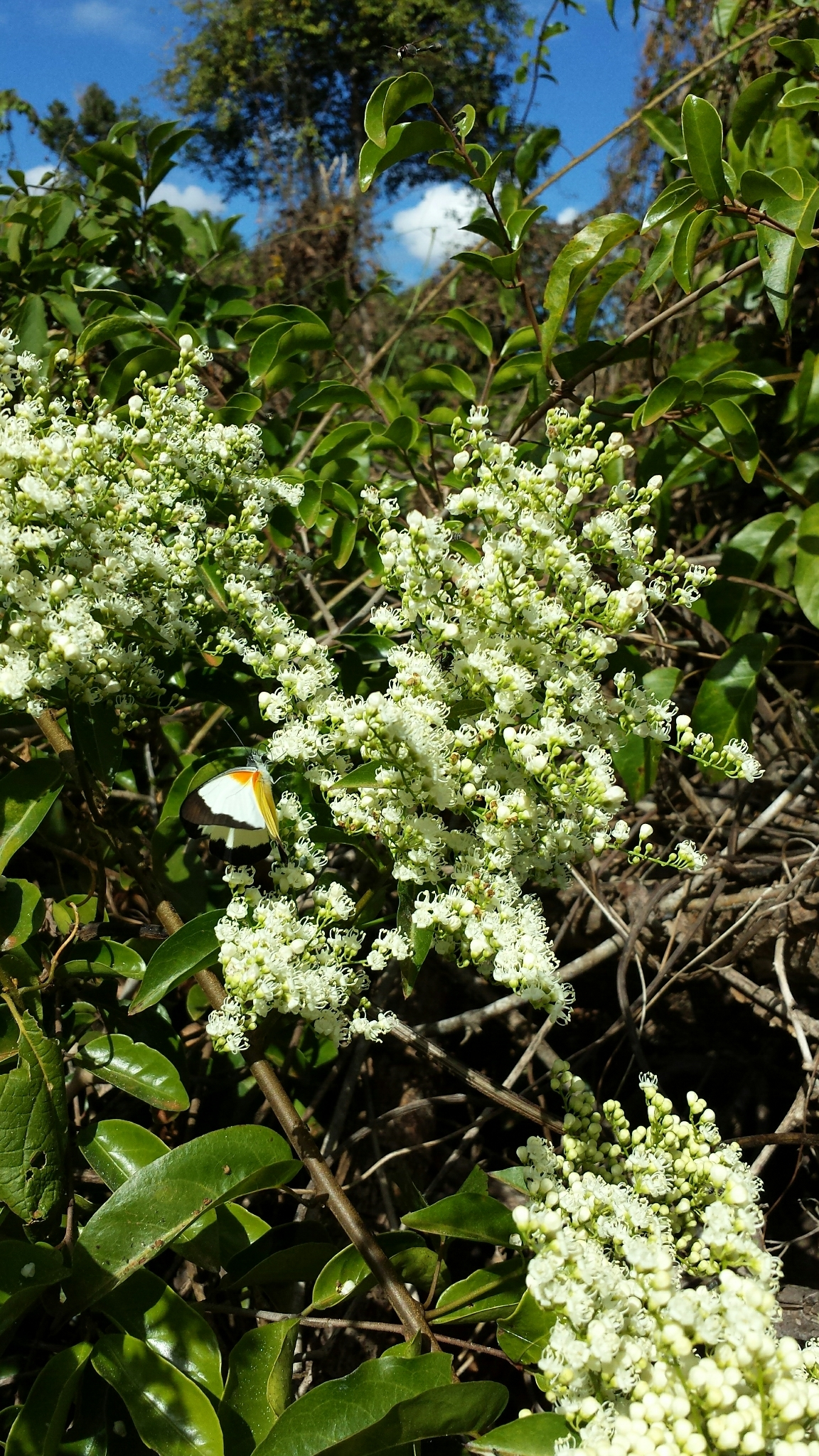
- Metaporana sericosepala

Scientific classification
- Kingdom: Plantae
- Clade: Embryophytes
- Clade: Tracheophytes
- Clade: Spermatophytes
- Clade: Angiosperms
- Clade: Eudicots
- Clade: Asterids
- Order: Solanales
- Family: Convolvulaceae
- Tribe: Poraneae
- Genus: Metaporana; N.E.Br.

= Metaporana =

Genus of flowering plants

Metaporana is a genus of plants in the bindweed family Convolvulaceae.

The following species are recognised in the genus Metaporana:

- Metaporana conica Verdc.
- Metaporana densiflora (Hallier f.) N.E.Br.
- Metaporana obtusa (Balf. f.) Staples
- Metaporana parvifolia (K. Afzel.) Verdc.
- Metaporana sericosepala Verdc.
- Metaporana verdcourtii Deroin
