= The Crichton =

Crichton Royal Hospital
- NHS Dumfries and Galloway
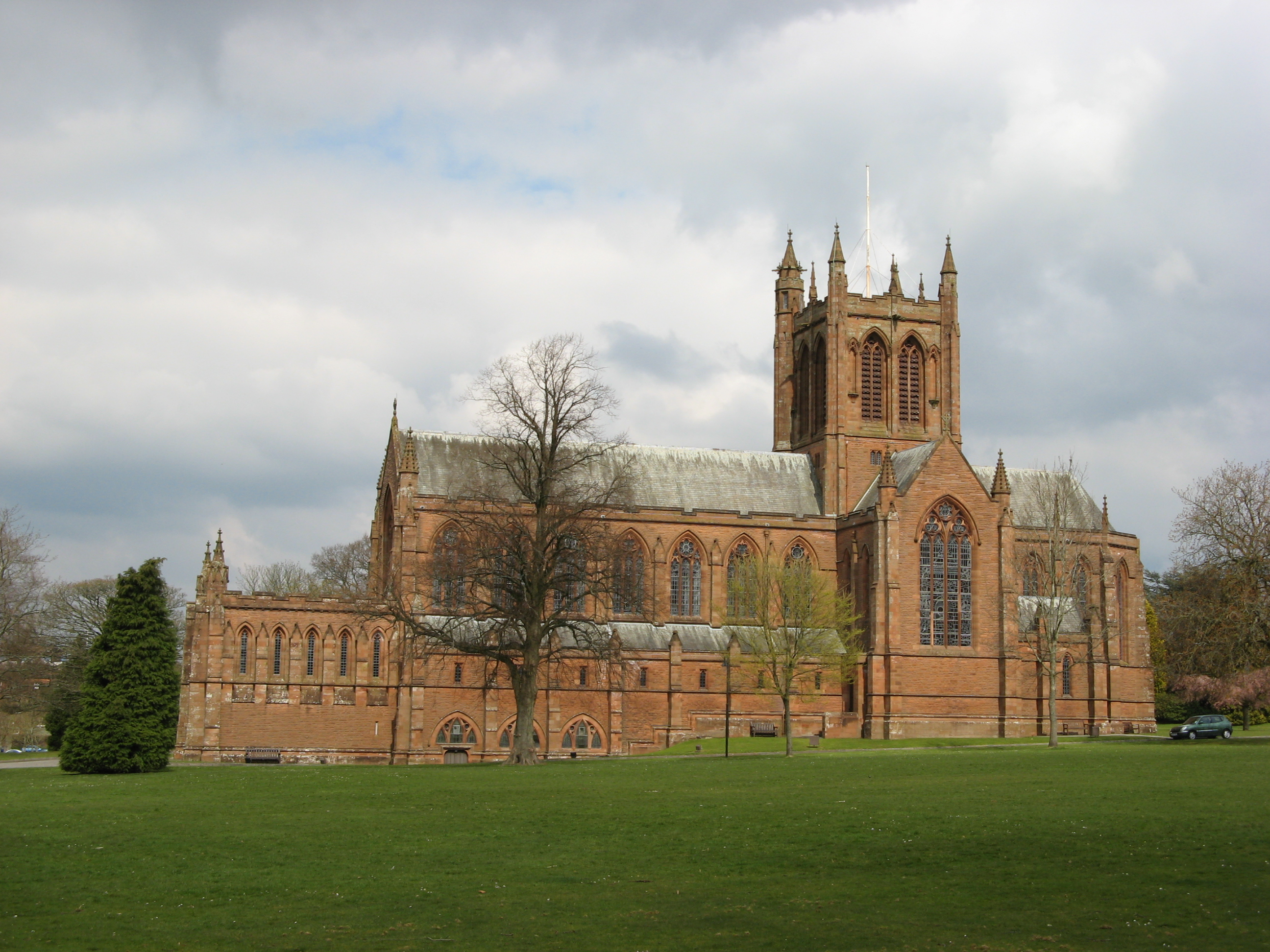
- Crichton Memorial Church

- Shown in Dumfries and Galloway

Geography
- Location: Dumfries, Dumfries and Galloway, Scotland, United Kingdom
- Coordinates: 55.0504°N 3.5927°W

Organisation
- Care system: Public NHS
- Type: Specialist

Services
- Speciality: Psychiatric hospital

History
- Founded: 1838
- Closed: 2013

Links
- Website: www.crichton.co.uk
- Lists: Hospitals in Scotland

The Crichton is an institutional campus in Dumfries in southwest Scotland. It serves as a remote campus for the University of Glasgow, the University of the West of Scotland, Dumfries and Galloway College, and the Open University. The site also includes a hotel and conference centre, and Crichton Memorial Church, set in a 100-acre (40-hectare) park. The campus was established in the 19th century as the Crichton Royal Hospital, a psychiatric hospital.

== History ==
Crichton Royal Institution for Lunatics at Dumfries Act 1840
- Act of Parliament
- Parliament of the United Kingdom
- Long title: An Act to incorporate the Trustees and others, Directors of the Crichton Royal Institution for Lunatics at Dumfries, and for the better enabling them to carry on their Charitable Designs.
- Citation: 3 & 4 Vict. c. xcix

Dates
- Royal assent: 3 July 1840

Text of statute as originally enacted

The last, and grandest, of Scotland's royal asylums was founded in Dumfries in 1838 by Elizabeth Crichton of Friars Carse (1779–1862), a wealthy local widow. Elizabeth Crichton's initial intention had been to found a university in Dumfries but she was blocked from doing so by the existing Scottish universities. The original hospital building, now Crichton Hall, was designed by William Burn and opened as the Crichton Institution for Lunatics in 1839. It became the Crichton Royal Institution in 1840. The Southern Counties Asylum, which was intended to provide facilities for paupers, was erected on the site in 1849 and subsequently amalgamated with the main facility.

Elizabeth Crichton persuaded the phrenologist William A. F. Browne (1805–1885) to become medical superintendent and to implement his innovative ideas of occupational therapy and art therapy. Browne remained at the Crichton for almost twenty years (1838-1857) and made a decisive contribution to asylum psychiatry, setting benchmark standards in therapeutic administration. He also hoarded a vast collection of patient art. The Crichton became widely known in the twentieth century for psychiatric research under the leadership of German Jewish émigrés, including Dr Willi Mayer-Gross.

Psychotherapist Ursula Fleming was educated at the hospital and Kate Fraser, an early Scottish psychiatrist, was a junior resident at the hospital. Among the people to have been treated there are artist Charles Altamont Doyle (father of Sir Arthur Conan Doyle), William James Blacklock, Lydia Miller (widow of Hugh Miller), and feminist writer Dora Marsden. An unidentified female patient of Dr James Gilchrist was featured as an illustration (Figure 19) in Charles Darwin's The Expression of the Emotions in Man and Animals (1872).

The hospital was expanded in the late 19th century, when Sydney Mitchell & Wilson added various buildings, including the Crichton Memorial Church. It is now a category A listed building. Further villas were constructed between 1910 and 1914 by Mitchell's assistant Ernest Auldo Jamieson, and yet further between 1923 and 1936. The hospital became the Crichton Royal Hospital in 1945 and it joined the National Health Service in 1948.

In 1995 the Crichton Development Company was established to regenerate the redundant hospital. Several buildings were converted for business park use, while the central area was maintained as a public park. A golf course was developed to the west of the site, and a hotel and conference centre were opened. Prince Charles visited the site and unveiled a statue of Elizabeth Crichton in May 2000.

The Crichton Development Company acquired a 125-year lease on the site in 2004. Dumfries and Galloway College moved to a new purpose-built £40 million building within the grounds in 2008.

The last of the mental health wards finally closed in 2013, concluding the site's use as a hospital.

== Courses ==
The courses on offer at the Crichton University Campus include business, computing, teacher training and nursing courses. The Crichton Carbon Centre, housed in the Rutherford/McCowan building, is one of only two places where the Carbon Management postgraduate degree is available in Scotland. The University of Glasgow offers an MA in Health and Social Policy, an MA Primary Education Programme with Teaching Qualification and a BSc in Environmental Science and Sustainability on the campus.

== See also ==
- Crichton F.C. took their name from playing on the sports fields at the campus
