= Plinian Society =

Student club

The Plinian Society was a club at the University of Edinburgh for students interested in natural history. It was founded in 1823. Several of its members went on to have prominent careers, most notably Charles Darwin who announced his first scientific discoveries at the society.

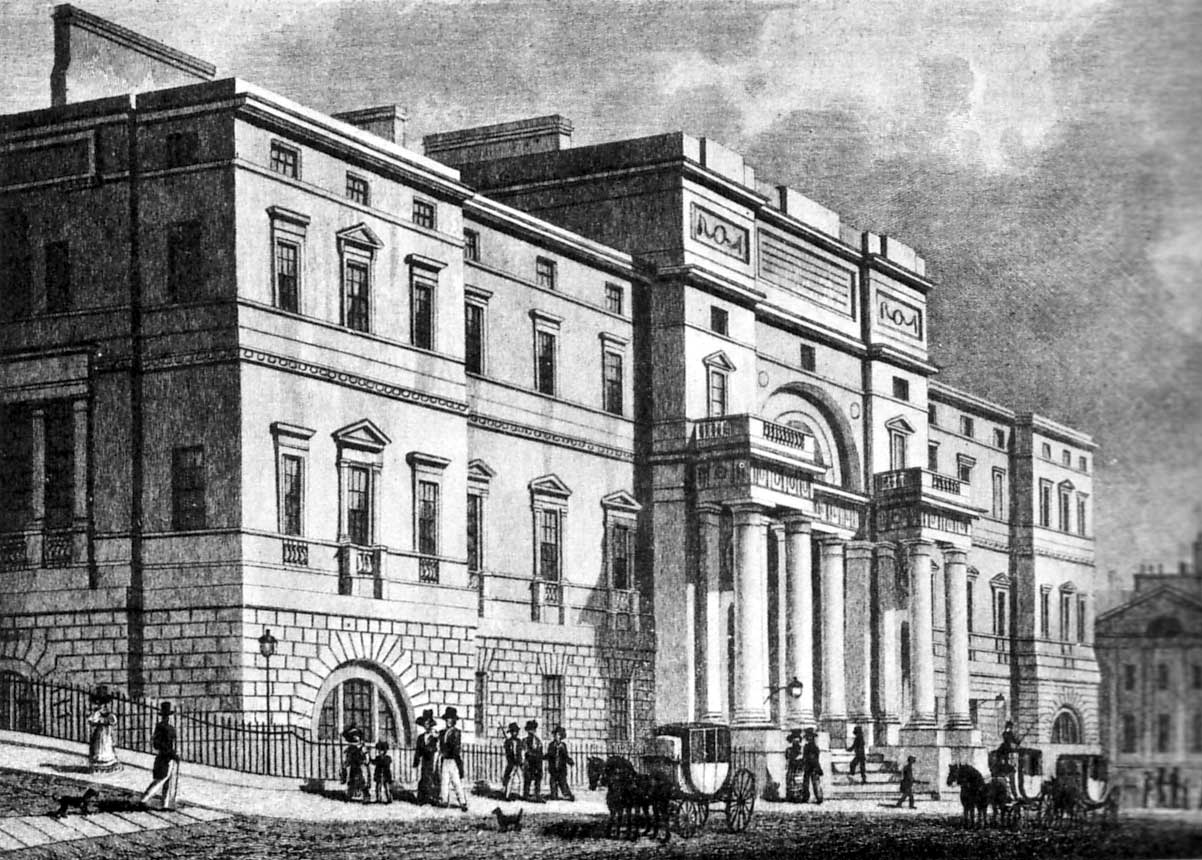
Edinburgh University around 1827.

== Foundation, activities and membership ==
The society was initiated and promoted by three brothers from Berwickshire. John Baird, the oldest brother, was the first president of the society and at the inaugural meeting on 14 January 1823 he made a statement of the proposed plan and objectives of the society. He drew up an elaborate code of laws for the society, in eighteen chapters. The original members included James Hardie and J. Grant Malcomson, who later became geologists in India, and John Coldstream. The Regius Professor of Natural History, Robert Jameson, had previously established the Wernerian Natural History Society for graduates and professors. He was given the title of Senior Honorary Member by the students, but never attended the Plinian and was not its founder.

From Darwin's description, the Plinian "consisted of students and met in an underground room in the university for the sake of reading papers on natural science and discussing them." Activities also included excursions to the countryside around Edinburgh. Meetings appear to have been weekly, until at the society's request, Jameson put their case to the university for a room in his museum for their meetings and their own small "museum", but the outcome was that the rent on their old room was raised and they eventually agreed to rent the Speculative Society's room for meetings on alternate Tuesdays. Papers presented by the students were often of high quality, inspired by their lecturers. Commonly, papers took the form of a critique of the work of established experts, together with the student's own thoughts. They covered a wide range of subjects including the circulation of ocean currents, identification of plants found in the nearby countryside, the anatomy of sea animals they had collected and principles of classification.

Meetings included a great deal of procedure, with votes on motions and resolutions, and an annual reassessment of the elaborate rules. At that time each meeting was attended by around 25 members, including the five joint presidents, secretary, treasurer, "museum curator" and five members of the council. Around 150 past and present members were on the books. Most were medical undergraduates, with three or four who had graduated being referred to as "Dr" in the minutes. Several were legal students or humanities students, and a fair number of students from England reflected the numbers of nonconformists who were barred from attending the universities in England which required Anglicanism, and instead went to university in Scotland. Professors did not attend, and a December 1826 visit by Andrew Duncan secundus who intended to donate his latest publication as a reference book was greeted with indignation and a sarcastic student newspaper report that "This is the first time, says our correspondent, we remember to have seen one of our Professors in the Plinian Society."

== Grant, Browne and Darwin ==
" I forget whether you attended Edinburgh [University] as a student, but in my time, there was a knot of men who were far from being the indifferent and dull listeners which you expect..." Charles Darwin to J.D. Hooker, 10th February 1845.

"One day, when we were walking together, [Grant] burst forth in high admiration of Lamarck and his views on evolution. I listened in silent astonishment, and as far as I can judge, without any effect on my mind. I had previously read the Zoonomia of my grandfather, in which similar views are maintained...." Charles Darwin (1876) Recollections of the Development of my Mind and Character.

Dr Robert Edmond Grant had graduated in 1814, and then studied anatomy with Georges Cuvier and embryology with Étienne Geoffroy Saint-Hilaire in Paris. On returning in 1824 he was appointed lecturer in invertebrate animals at the private anatomy school set up by John Barclay and run by Robert Knox from 1826. His lectures there promoted Geoffroy's "philosophical anatomy" based on unity of plan compatible with the transmutation of species, implying ideas of progressive improvement and hence radical support for democracy. He was secretary of the Plinian, then in 1826 gave up that post to join the Council of the Wernerian Natural History Society. Plinian members helped with his pioneering work on marine invertebrates from the Firth of Forth, with Coldstream assisting him in 1825–1826.

William A. F. Browne - an atheistic phrenologist - was proposed for membership by John Coldstream despite Coldstream's religious inclinations. (Coldstream later made a considerable contribution to the psychiatry of learning disability). Browne was a proponent of Lamarckian "developmental" theories of the mind and at the Edinburgh Phrenological Society, George Combe toasted him for his success in proselytising other medical students. Browne also presented papers on various subjects, including plants he had collected, the habits of the cuckoo, the aurora borealis, and ghosts (which he believed in). Browne went on to a distinguished career as an asylum reformer at Sunnyside Royal Hospital in Montrose (1834–1838) and, famously, at the Crichton Royal, Dumfries (1838–1857); his son, James Crichton-Browne, collaborated with Darwin in the preparation of The Expression of the Emotions in Man and Animals (1872).

In the second year of Charles Darwin's education at Edinburgh he took an increased interest in natural history. Browne, Coldstream and George Fife as three of the five joint presidents proposed Darwin for membership, and he petitioned to join the Plinian on 21 November 1826, at a meeting when Browne announced his intention to refute Charles Bell's Anatomy and Philosophy of Expression. Darwin was elected a member of the Plinian on 28 November 1826, along with another student of his own age, William Rathbone Greg, who immediately announced plans for a talk showing that "the lower animals possess every faculty & propensity of the human mind." Greg would later become a noted writer on Victorian social problems, including prostitution, and on female sexual desire. On 5 December Darwin was elected to the Society's council. At the same meeting Browne presented his attack on Sir Charles Bell's claims that the Creator had endowed humans with unique muscles lacking in animals. Bell argued that this allowed the expression of emotions showing mankind's superior moral nature, while Browne denied that there was any such essential difference. Darwin went on to attend eighteen of nineteen meetings that he could have attended during that academic year, and became a zealous assistant to Grant, learning to collect and dissect seashore creatures.

Darwin made a discovery new to science when he observed cilia moving the microscopic larvae of a species of the bryozoan Flustra, and discovered that black spores often found in oyster shells were the eggs of a skate leech. He was disappointed when Grant announced these finds to the Wernerian on 24 March 1827, and Darwin presented both discoveries at the Plinian Society on 27 March, his first public presentation. Grant then gave an authoritative talk on sea-mats, followed by Browne who, as a phrenologist, argued that mind and consciousness were simply aspects of brain activity, rather than evidence of "souls" or spiritual entities separate from the body. A furious debate ensued, and subsequently someone took the extraordinary step of deleting the minutes of this heretical part of the discussion.

== Later events ==
John Hutton Balfour joined the Plinian in 1827 and Hugh Falconer in 1828. Balfour took up the Chair of Botany at Edinburgh in 1845 and was, for many years, Dean of the Faculty of Medicine; his sister, Magdalene Balfour, married William A.F. Browne and bore him eight children, including James Crichton-Browne. The Baird brothers made occasional appearances after graduation, then in the 1829–1830 session they returned to Berwickshire, with two of them becoming ministers of local parishes. The society collapsed in 1841.
