= John Coldstream =

Scottish physician (1806–1863)

John Coldstream (1806–1863) was a Scottish physician.

== Life ==
Coldstream, only son of Robert Coldstream, merchant in Timber Bush, by his wife Elizabeth, daughter of John Phillips of Stobcross, Glasgow, was born at Leith on 19 March 1806, and after attending the Royal High School, Edinburgh, continued his studies at the university. He took an interest in Bible and missionary societies, and in 1822 wrote the report of the Leith Juvenile Bible Society.

When he decided to study medicine, Coldstream became apprenticed to Dr. Charles Anderson, a general practitioner in Leith and one of the founders of the Wernerian Society. Coldstream's love of natural history led to his election as a member of the student Plinian Society on 18 March 1823; he acted as secretary and treasurer in the same year, and was appointed as one of the presidents in 1824 and 1825. Along with the radical materialist William A. F. Browne, he nominated Charles Darwin for membership of the Plinian. He became well acquainted with Darwin and they went together to collect marine invertebrates on the shores of the Firth of Forth at Leith. In dramatic debates at the Plinian Society, Browne suggested that the mind could have a material basis in the brain, and Coldstream (like Darwin) was present when Browne presented his view that phrenology could best be understood in Lamarckian terms.

In 1827 Coldstream graduated M.D. at the University of Edinburgh, and took his diploma at the Royal College of Surgeons of Edinburgh, then went to Paris for his year of hospital study to continue his medical education. He looked at places of interest, and on 15 January 1828 met Alexis Bouvard who gave him use of the Paris Observatory and assistance in meteorological studies. He noted in his diary religious thoughts, and occasional anguish such as "the foul mass of corruption within my own bosom", "corroding desires" and "lustful imaginations". Mr William Mackenzie of the Mission House, Passy, befriended him, and later said that though Coldstream had led "a blameless life", he was "more or less in the dark on the vital question of religion, and was troubled with doubts arising from certain Materialist views, which are, alas! too common among medical students." Coldstream remained in France until June, then set out for Prussia hoping to travel up the Rhine and through Switzerland and the north of Italy, but these plans were cancelled when he became ill in Westphalia and had a mental breakdown, so had to hurry home through the Netherlands. He returned to Leith around the end of July in a poor state of health, recovering very slowly. For a time he gave up natural history to prepare for medical practice, which he began in early December.

In 1828 Coldstream declined an offer of the post of assistant in the Natural History Institution at Portsmouth, and in 1829, he settled down as a consultant physician in Leith Hospital. On 9 Jan. 1830 he was enrolled a member of the Wernerian Natural History Society. He occasionally corresponded with Darwin. In a letter dated 28 February 1829 he expressed disappointment that Darwin's planned visit to Edinburgh had been cancelled due to illness, and gave news of his own recent activities. In 1831 he assisted with preparations for the Beagle expedition by suggesting reference books and giving requested information about the use and construction of an oyster-trawl for collecting marine organisms, which Darwin used in his first collecting during the voyage.

About 1840 the subject of medical missions became topical. Coldstream was one of the first to recognise their value and importance. With his friend, Benjamin Bell, he became associate secretary of the Medical Missionary Society. In 1841 he was elected a member of the Harveian Society of Edinburgh. In 1845 he was elected a Fellow of the Royal College of Physicians of Edinburgh, but scarcely took any part in their proceedings. In 1845 he was also elected a member of the Aesculapian Club. In October 1846 he played an important part in setting up a hospital for the poor in Leith. He moved to York Place, Edinburgh, in 1847, no longer feeling equal to the stresses of a working class practice at Leith. His interest in the care and education of disabled people led to the establishment in 1855 of the Home and School for Invalid and Imbecile Children in Gayfield Square, Edinburgh, and for five years he was almost a daily visitor. In September 1857 he went to Berlin to a meeting of the Evangelical Alliance, where he advocated the cause of medical missions. During the winter of 1858–9, Coldstream developed a number of gastro-intestinal symptoms, probably as a presentation of gastric carcinoma; however, he was well enough to deliver a course of lectures on ethnography in the winter of 1859–60. After this the state of his health deteriorated, and he died at Irthing House, near Carlisle, 17 Sept. 1863.

Coldstream had been elected President of the Harveian Society of Edinburgh for 1864 and as a mark of respect following his death, the annual Festival was cancelled. His biography was written by John Hutton Balfour.

== Family ==
He married, 7 May 1835, Margaret, youngest daughter of the Rev. William Menzies of Lanark, by whom he had a family of ten children.

== Publications ==
1. De Indole Morborum Periodica utpote Sideribus orta 1827
2. An Account of the Topography, Climate, and State of the Town of Torquay 1833
3. The Abendberg, an Alpine Retreat, by G.L. of Geneva, with an introduction by J. Coldstream 1848
4. On the Responsibilities attaching to the Profession of Medicine Lecture 6 in Lectures on Medical Missions 1849
5. Notice of Attempts made to improve the Condition of the Fatuous 1850
6. On a Case of Catalepsy 1854
7. History of the Medical Missions in Addresses to Medical Students 1856

He was also a contributor to the transactions of the Plinian, Wernerian, Royal Medical, Edinburgh Medical and Surgical, and other societies.
