= Kate Fraser (physician) =

Scottish psychiatrist

Kate Fraser CBE
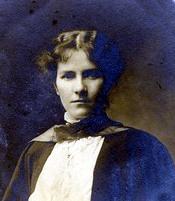
- Dr Kate Fraser at graduation
- Born: 10 August 1887; Paisley, Scotland
- Died: 20 March 1957 (aged 69); Paisley, Scotland
- Education: University of Glasgow
- Occupation: psychiatrist
- Medical career
- Field: psychiatry

Kate Fraser CBE (10 August 1887 – 20 March 1957) was a pioneering Scottish psychiatrist who sought to improve the well being and treatment of mentally ill patients. She was the first female Deputy Commissioner for the General Board of Control for Scotland in 1914 and Commissioner in 1935.

== Early life and education ==
Kate Fraser was born on 10 August 1887 in Paisley. Her parents were Margaret Coats, a member of the town's mill-owning family, and Donald Fraser, a doctor. She had 4 sisters.

She was educated at Miss Boag's School for Young Ladies and Paisley Grammar School, going on to Swanley Horticultural College. In 1894, aged 16, she enrolled at the art faculty of the University of Glasgow, later transferring to the science faculty. In 1900, she graduated with a BSc with a distinction in physiology, followed by her MBChB in 1903. In 1908, Fraser took a Diploma in Public Health. Her thesis for her 1913 MD was titled "Feeble-minded Children. An inquiry into a mental deficiency in school children with special reference to syphilis as a causative factor as determined by the Wassermann reaction".

== Career ==
After graduating, Fraser took a position as assistant physician at the Bridge of Weir Sanitorium, later becoming a junior resident at The Crichton Royal in Dumfries, a psychiatric hospital that encouraged patients to participate in activities. In 1907, she founded the Paisley Mental Welfare Association. As the first woman School Medical Officer in Govan from 1908, Fraser introduced intelligence tests in schools.

Fraser was the first female Deputy Commissioner for the General Board of Control for Scotland in 1914 and Commissioner in 1935. In this role, she petitioned for those with mental health conditions to be included in the Disabled Person's Employment Act (1958). Fraser retired from this position in 1945.

During the Second World War, Fraser put in place a rehabilitation scheme for servicemen who had been discharged on medical grounds. Fraser also had a long association with Waverley Park Home in Dunbartonshire. Fraser and Aidan Thomson co-authored Inquiry into Matters Arising out of the Methods of Discipline used at Waverley Park Certified Institution in 1938, in response to allegations of abuse.

In 1947, Fraser retired from her role as Commissioner of the General Board of Control for Scotland and became Chair of the Scottish Association for Mental Health (SAMH) and Chairman of the Scottish Division of the Royal Medico-Psychological Association.

== Personal life ==
Fraser never married and lived with her housekeeper until her death in Paisley on 20 March 1957.

== Legacy ==
Fraser gained an international reputation for her work in mental healthcare. The Scottish Association for Mental Health was based on the model for the Paisley Mental Welfare Association.

== Awards and honours ==
Fraser was appointed a CBE for her contribution to mental welfare at the age of 68.
