= 1707 in science =

The year 1707 in science and technology involved some significant events.

== Geophysics ==
- May 23 – Volcanic eruption in the Santorini caldera begins.
- October 28 – The Hōei earthquake ruptures all segments of the Nankai megathrust simultaneously – the only earthquake known to have done this. It is the most powerful in Japan until 2011, with an estimated local magnitude of 8.6.
- December 16 – Hōei eruption, the last eruption of Mount Fuji in Japan, begins.

== Mathematics ==
- Publication of Arithmetica universalis, the collected works of Isaac Newton on algebra.
- Abraham de Moivre derives de Moivre's formula.

== Medicine ==
- John Floyer, in The Physician's Pulse Watch, introduces counting of pulse rate during one minute.
- Giovanni Maria Lancisi publishes De Subitaneis Mortibus (On Sudden Death), an early work in cardiology.
- Georg Ernst Stahl publishes Theoria medica vera: physiologiam & pathologiam.

== Births ==
- January 11 – Vincenzo Riccati, Italian mathematician (died 1775)
- April 10 – John Pringle, Scottish physician (died 1782)
- April 15 – Leonhard Euler, Swiss mathematician (died 1783)
- April 26 – Johannes Burman, Dutch botanist (died 1780)
- May 23 – Carl Linnaeus, Swedish naturalist (died 1778)
- June 22 (bapt.) – Elizabeth Blackwell, Scottish-born botanical illustrator (died 1758)
- September 7 – Georges-Louis Leclerc, Comte de Buffon, French naturalist (died 1788)
- December 22 – Johann Amman, Swiss-Russian botanist (died 1741)
- date unknown – Benjamin Robins, English scientist and engineer (died 1751)

== Deaths ==
- March 30 – Marquis de Vauban, French military engineer (born 1633)
- Maria Clara Eimmart, German astronomer, engraver and designer (born 1676)
