= Hillside, Angus =

Coordinates: 56.742°N 2.480°W

Hillside
- Location within Angus
- Population: 1,140 (2020)
- OS grid reference: NO708611
- Council area: Angus
- Lieutenancy area: Angus
- Country: Scotland
- Sovereign state: United Kingdom
- Post town: MONTROSE
- Postcode district: DD10
- Dialling code: 01674
- Police: Scotland
- Fire: Scottish
- Ambulance: Scottish
- UK Parliament: Angus
- Scottish Parliament: Angus North and Mearns

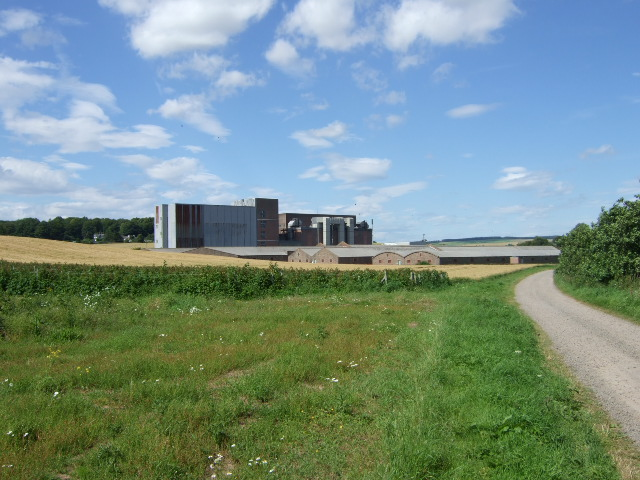
Maltings and Distillery near Hillside

Hillside is a small private village in Angus, Scotland, situated 5 miles to the north of Montrose. The village is the location for the now disused psychiatric hospital, Sunnyside Royal Hospital. The hospital which was founded by Susan Carnegie in 1781 as the Montrose Lunatic Asylum, Infirmary and Dispensary had originally been situated on Montrose links. It moved out of the town to new premises at Hillside on lands that were part of Sunnyside farm in 1858. The hospital was expanded several times thereafter, before finally closing in 2011. The hospital grounds and hospital itself is now covered with hundreds of luxury new build homes.
