= Susan Carnegie =

Scottish writer and benefactor

- Born: Susan Scott; August 7, 1743; Edinburgh
- Died: April 14, 1821 (aged 77); Montrose
- Burial place: Howff, Charleton, Montrose
- Monuments: Susan Carnegie Centre, NHS Tayside
- Occupations: Writer and Benefactor
- Known for: Founding the Montrose Lunatic Asylum
- Spouse: George Carnegie
- Children: 9

Susan Carnegie (née Scott; 7 August 1743 - 14 April 1821) was a writer and benefactor who helped found the Montrose Asylum, the first public asylum in Scotland.

== Early life and education ==
Carnegie was born on 7 August 1743 in Edinburgh to Mary Brown (1712-1794) and David Scott (1700-1768), who was the Treasurer of the Bank of Scotland. She was baptised in 1744. Tutored at home, she studied various subjects including philosophy, and became fluent in French and Italian. She also became skilled in drawing, composed poetry, and was interested in both economics and society.

Influenced by Jean-Jacques Rousseau's treatise Emile, or On Education, she drew attention to the differences in educational opportunities afforded to women and their treatment in society, refusing the notion that women were less capable intellectually than men.

== Charitable work ==
In March 1799, Carnegie was successful in persuading the kirk session of the town council in Montrose to approve her plan for an asylum. She was assisted in her work by Provost Alexander Christie. She was motivated by the then-unusual belief that the treatment of mental illness should be what one modern source describes as "humane and science-based", rather than being a matter for prisons. Funds for the project were raised from the profits of her own estates, which she had secured through her marriage contract, and also through her own networks. The asylum was built and opened in 1781, as the Montrose Lunatic Asylum, Infirmary and Dispensary; it was the first public asylum to be opened in Scotland, and one of the first in the English-speaking world. The institution gained a Royal Charter in 1810, closing eventually in 2011, and the building sold for housing development in 2016.

Carnegie's influence on the ethos of the institution persisted even after her death; in 1834, in accordance with her wishes concerning the kind of care which should be provided, the asylum hired William A. F. Browne.

Carnegie was an active campaigner and philanthropist, gathering support for action following a number of local drownings; in 1808 she founded the Montrose Female Friendly Society, was involved in the poor relief activities of the local kirk (as well as raising funds for the kirk itself), and in 1815 founded a local savings bank.

== Writing ==
Carnegie was a poet, and published several works under the pseudonym Juliette North. She also corresponded with the poet and moral philosopher James Beattie under the pseudonym Arethusa. A copy of her work Dunottar Castle: a poem, published in the 1820s, is held by the University of Aberdeen.

== Personal life ==
On 17 March 1769 she married George Carnegie (born 1726), who was 18 years older than her, and with whom she had nine children; six sons and three daughters. Eight of her children survived into adulthood, although three of her sons died as soldiers during her lifetime. Before their marriage, George had fought in the Jacobite rising of 1745 and, after the Battle of Culloden, was exiled in Gothenburg until his eventual return in 1769. He died thirty years later, in 1799.

== Death ==
Carnegie died on 14 April 1821 in Charleton, Montrose, at the age of 77. Her obituary, published in the Caledonian Mercury and the Montrose Chronicle, stated "To befriend the widow and fatherless, to feed the hungry and to clothe the naked, to assist the honest and industrious in time of need, and to shield, by the utmost extent of her influence, the weak and unprotected, ever yielded her the highest gratification."

NHS Tayside named the Susan Carnegie Centre, opened on 5 December 2011, after her. A portrait of her, by an unknown artist, is owned by NHS Tayside.
