= Listed buildings in Cumwhitton =

Cumwhitton is a civil parish in the Cumberland district of Cumbria, England. It contains four listed buildings that are recorded in the National Heritage List for England. All the listed buildings are designated at Grade II, the lowest of the three grades, which is applied to "buildings of national importance and special interest". The parish contains the village of Cumwhitton and the surrounding countryside. The listed buildings consist of a house, a church, a former vicarage, and a wellhead.

== Buildings ==
| Name and location | Photograph | Date | Notes |
|---|---|---|---|
| St Mary's Church; 54.86261°N 2.77078°W | | 12th century | The church was mostly rebuilt in the 19th century, and earlier material has been retained. It is in sandstone on a chamfered plinth, with quoins and a slate roof. The church consists of a nave with a north aisle, a chancel with a north vestry, and a west tower incorporating a porch. The tower has three stages, a doorway with a semicircular fanlight containing intersecting tracery, external stone steps leading to the ringing chamber, a clock face on the west side, and a pyramidal roof with a weathervane. In the wall of the church is a piece of Norman zigzag decoration, and a sundial. Inside the church the arcade has 12th-century circular piers and round arches. |
| Beech House; 54.86075°N 2.77241°W | — | Early 19th century | A sandstone house on a chamfered plinth, with quoins and a slate roof. There are two storeys and three bays. The doorway has an alternate block surround and a keyed entablature, and the windows are sashes with raised stone surrounds. |
| Vicarage; 54.86215°N 2.77287°W | — | 1830s (probable) | The former vicarage is in sandstone on a chamfered plinth, with quoins and a hipped slate roof. There are two storeys and three bays. The doorway has a plain surround, a moulded cornice, and a patterned fanlight. The windows are sashes with plain stone surrounds. |
| Wellhead; 54.86281°N 2.77151°W | — | 1897 | The wellhead is in the centre of the village green. It is in sandstone, and has a moulded surround with flanking reeded pilasters, a block entablature, and a triangular pediment containing the date. In front of it is a semicircular retaining wall. |
