= William James Blacklock =

English landscape painter (1816–1858)

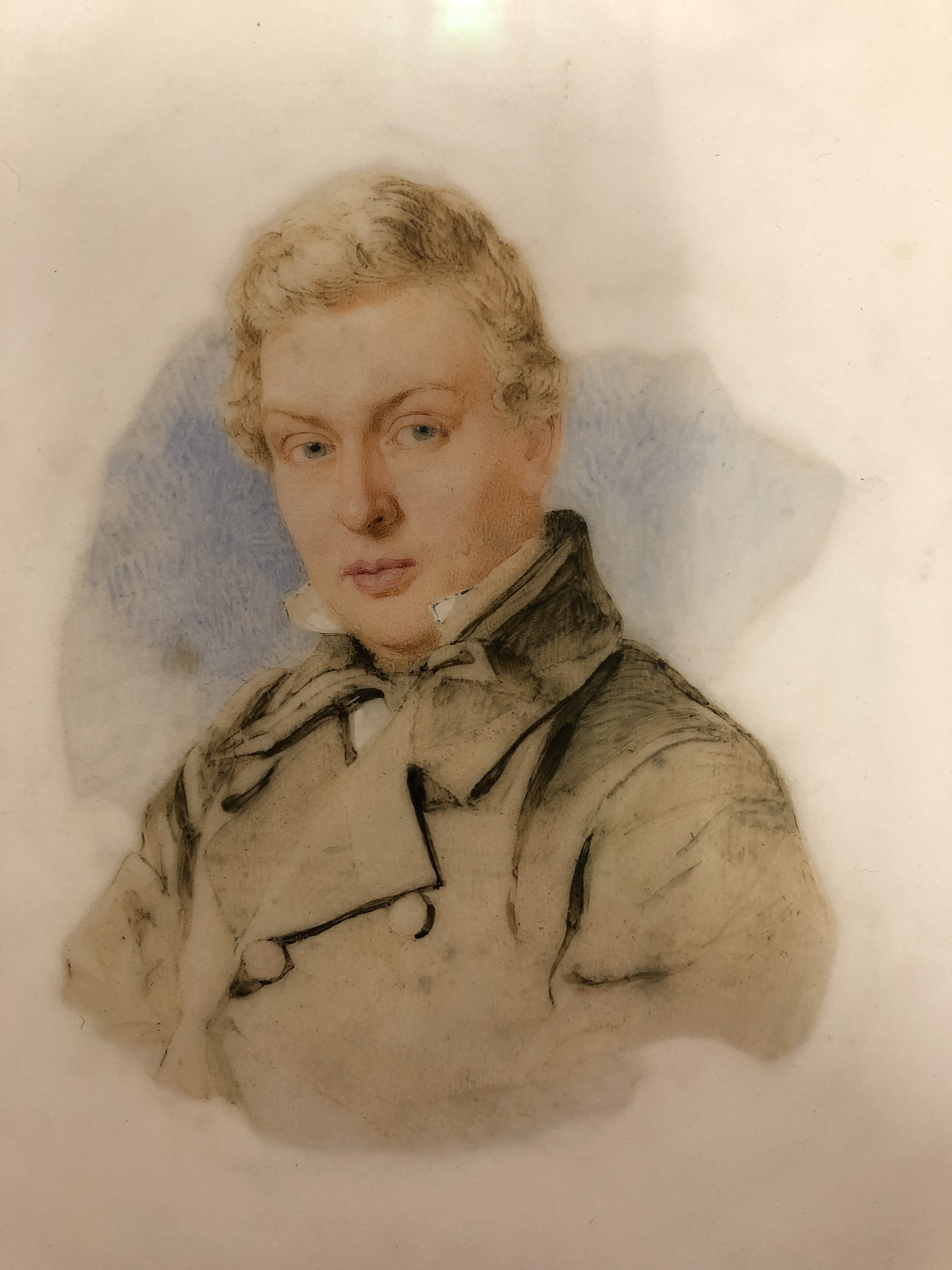
William James Blacklock Blacklock illustrated by Thomas Heathfield Carrick

- "The Chapel at Haddon Hall" 1853
- Born: 3 March 1816; Shoreditch, London, England
- Died: 12 March 1858 (aged 42); Dumfries, Scotland
- Occupation: Landscape artist

William James Blacklock (3 March 1816 – 12 March 1858) was an English landscape painter, painting scenery in Cumbria, the Lake District and the Scottish Borders.

== Biography ==
Blacklock was born in Shoreditch, London, the second of five children. His father was James Blacklock (1782–1823), a bookseller and publisher, and his mother was Mary Ann Blacklock (née Pearson) (1784–1853).

The Blacklock family had roots in Cumberland dating back to the 1730s, and in 1818 they moved from London to the small village of Cumwhitton, about eight miles east of Carlisle, where the family owned property and farmed. They are believed to have lived in Cumwhitton House, a detached, double fronted sandstone property dating back to 1818.

As a boy, Blacklock was apprenticed to Charles Thurnam, a publisher and bookseller in Carlisle and a friend of his father. He was, however, keen on drawing and decided to pursue a career as an artist. Carlisle had become an important artistic centre since the Academy of Art had opened in 1823, and Blacklock was taught there by the Carlisle artist Matthew Ellis Nutter. Blacklock exhibited at the Academy in 1833, and was described as a "rising artist" with a "feeling for nature and a correctness of taste."

Blacklock moved to London in 1836 and lived there until 1850, enjoying increasing success and renown. His picturesque style was likened to that of William Mulready and he was praised by such artists as J. M. W. Turner, David Roberts and Thomas Creswick. He exhibited four pictures at the Royal Academy of Arts in 1836, and went on to show a total of eleven pictures at the Society of British Artists, four at the British Institution and thirty six at the Royal Academy of Arts during the period 1835–1855. It is believed that Blacklock may have seen the cleaning of old masters in the National Gallery in 1844–45, which would have been an invaluable experience in terms of the evolution of his own technique.

In 1847 William Ewart Gladstone bought Blacklock's painting Lanercost Abbey. James Leathart and Lord Armstrong, both Tyneside industrialists and art collectors, bought several of Blacklock's paintings in the early 1850s, through Blacklock's admirer and friend of the Pre-Raphaelites, William Bell Scott.

However, by 1850 Blacklock's health and eyesight were deteriorating, and he moved back to Cumwhitton and worked in a studio in Stanwix just outside Carlisle until 1854, when illness and the loss of sight in one eye made work increasingly difficult. In November 1855 his youngest brother Thomas had him admitted to the Crichton Royal in Dumfries, suffering from an illness described as "monomania of ambition and general paralysis." The Institution pioneered the use of artistic activity in treating patients, and his case notes indicate that he continued to draw until mid-1857; a drawing of a cathedral and a watercolour of Craigmillar Castle produced during this time have been attributed to him. After this he suffered further mental deterioration and died in the Crichton on 12 March 1858 of general paresis of the insane, or syphilis, aged 42.

He was buried in Cumwhitton on 16 March 1858. An extract from his obituary described him as a "truthful and unpretending artist, who wooed nature rather than popular favour."

== Assessment ==
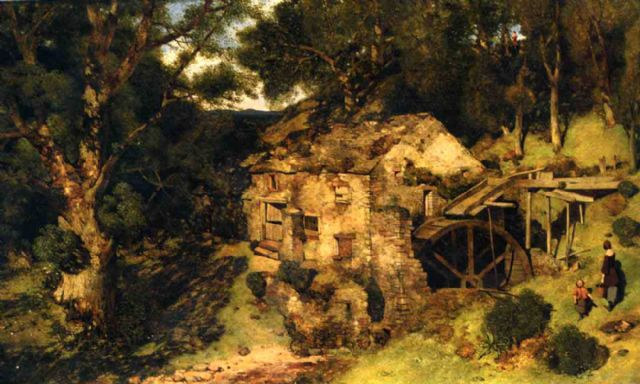
An old mill near Haweswater, 1854

William Bell Scott recognised the early Pre-Raphaelite precision in Blacklock's technique and his great power of truth; indeed it was Scott and his artistic friends (almost certainly including Rossetti), who used Blacklock's painting Barnard Castle of 1852–53 to try to study his luminous glazes over a white ground which had been developed over a number of years.

Blacklock thereafter developed into an artist of great power. The Steps at Haddon Hall, exhibited in 1848 at the Norwich Exhibition, has been described as the first thorough going mature white ground technique Pre-Raphaelite-influenced English landscape painting, and both its technique and inclusion of Huguenot figures, representing a thematic trend in British art of the period, as seen in John Everett Millais's later A Huguenot (1851–52).

Although Blacklock's art can be described as semi-photographic, Blacklock rejected Ruskin's exact copying of truth to nature and the Victorian faith in facts for his own inner thoughts and imagination.

Geoffrey Grigson had written in the mid-twentieth century that "Blacklock, I reflect, belongs to the generation of Courbet, that creative wonder between Romanticism and Impressionism: he comes after Constable and after Corot," adding that Blacklock participated differently in a naturalism of vision and imagination which changed the arts by the middle of the 19th century, and was related to a broader artistic response at the time to newly valued works of the Italian Renaissance by Giorgione and Giovanni Bellini. Writing in a Sotheby's sale catalogue in 2010, Christopher Newall noted that, "Although hard to place in the evolving pattern of progressive landscape painting in the mid-nineteenth century, Blacklock is an important and intriguing figure who may be regarded as a pivot between the early nineteenth-century landscape school and the achievements of Romanticism, and the earnest and obsessive innovation of the Pre-Raphaelite school." Blacklock's finished oils are rare, with the largest collection of his work housed in the Tullie House Museum and Art Gallery, Carlisle, which also owns around a dozen watercolors and drawings by the artist

== Works ==
His works include:

- 1843 – Gilnockie Tower (oil)
- 1843 – On the Banks of Derwentwater; Silver Birch, Tullie House Museum and Art Gallery, Carlisle
- 1844 – Askerton Castle
- 1844 – Buit's Castle, Bewcastle, Tullie House Museum and Art Gallery, Carlisle
- 1845 – The Terrace, Haddon Hall, Tullie House Museum and Art Gallery, Carlisle
- 1847 – Lanercost Abbey
- 1847 – Calder Abbey
- 1848 – The Steps at Haddon Hall
- 1849 – Naworth Castle, Cumbria, National Gallery of Ireland, Dublin
- c. 1850 – Solway (watercolour)
- 1852–3 – Barnard Castle
- 1853 – Devock Water, Abbot Hall Art Gallery
- 1853 – Lakeland mountains, Crummock water, Grassmoor and Whiteless Pike (sold 2008 for £51,650)
- 1854 – An old mill near Haweswater
- 1854 – The Ruins of Kirkoswald Castle, Cumberland, Laing Art Gallery, Newcastle
- 1854 – Catbells and Causey Pike, Derwentwater, Tullie House Museum and Art Gallery, Carlisle
- 1854 – The Rookery, Tullie House Museum and Art Gallery, Carlisle
- 1855 – By the lakeside
- 1855 – Hermitage Castle
- 1855 – The Border Keep
- 1855 – Elter Water, and the Langdale Pikes
- 1855 – Belted Will's Tower, Naworth Castle
- 1850–58 – Landscape with Bridge and Figures, Tullie House Museum and Art Gallery, Carlisle

== Galleries ==
Blacklock's works are in the following collections:

- Tullie House Museum and Art Gallery, Carlisle, with 33 works.
- National Gallery of Ireland, Dublin
- Abbot Hall Art Gallery, Kendal

== Sources ==
- Graves, Robert Edmund (1886). "Blacklock, William James" . In Stephen, Leslie (ed.). Dictionary of National Biography. Vol. 5. London: Smith, Elder & Co.

Media related to William James Blacklock at Wikimedia Commons
