= 1744 in science =

The year 1744 in science and technology involved some significant events.

== Astronomy ==
- Great Comet of 1744, first sighted in 1743, remains visible until April (perihelion about March 1).

== Cartography ==
- César-François Cassini de Thury publishes a new triangulated map of France.

== Earth sciences ==
- Susanna Drury's illustrations of the Giant's Causeway in northern Ireland are engraved by François Vivares in London (1743–4), bringing the rock formation to wide European notice.

== Mathematics ==
- Leonhard Euler discovers the catenoid and proves it to be a minimal surface.

== Medicine ==
- By July – Northampton General Hospital established as Northampton Infirmary in England.

== Awards ==
- Copley Medal: Henry Baker

== Births ==
- March 7 - Jean-Baptiste Dumangin, French physician (died 1826)
- June 22 – Johann Christian Polycarp Erxleben, German naturalist (died 1777)
- August 1 – Jean-Baptiste Lamarck, French naturalist (died 1829)
- August 16 – Pierre Méchain, French astronomer (died 1804)
- October 17 – Andrew Duncan, Scottish physician (died 1828)

== Deaths ==
- February 14 – John Hadley, English mathematician (born 1682)
- April 25 – Anders Celsius, Swedish astronomer and thermometrician (born 1701)
- July 1 – Catherine Jérémie, French-Canadian botanist (born 1644)
- October 4/5 – John Serson, English inventor (in wreck of HMS Victory (1737))
