= 1701 in science =

The year 1701 in science and technology involved some significant events.

== Earth sciences ==
- Edmond Halley's General Chart of the Variation of the Compass is first published, the first to show magnetic declination (in the Atlantic Ocean) and the first on which isogonic, or Halleyan, lines appear.

== Medicine ==
- Italian physician Giacomo Pylarini inoculates children with smallpox in Constantinople, in hopes of preventing more serious smallpox sickness when the children are older, thus becoming the first immunologist.

== Physics ==
- Joseph Sauveur coins the French word acoustique, from which the English word acoustics is derived.

== Technology ==
- The seed drill, invented by Jethro Tull in England, allows farmers to sow seeds in well-spaced rows at specific depths.
- Sir Isaac Newton, reporting (anonymously) to the Royal Society of London, describes creation of a liquid-in-glass thermometer that is 3 ft (1 m) long and has a two-inch (5-cm) diameter bulb using linseed oil.

== Births ==
- January 28 – Charles Marie de La Condamine, French geographer (died 1774)
- May 14 – William Emerson, English mathematician (died 1782)
- November 27 – Anders Celsius, Swedish astronomer, physicist, and mathematician (died 1744)
- Approximate date
  - Thomas Bayes, English mathematician (died 1761)
  - Henry Hindley, English clock and scientific instrument maker (died 1771)
