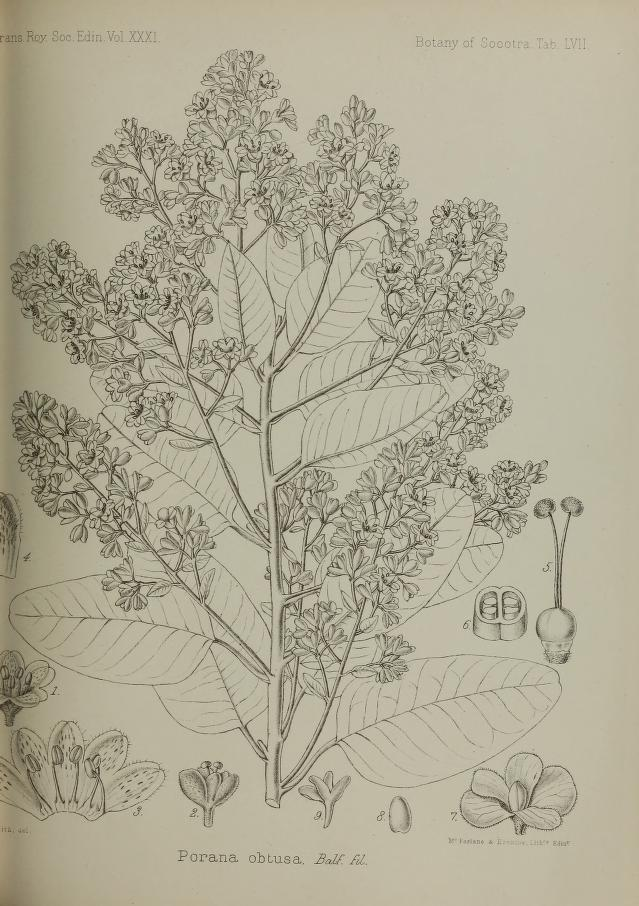
- Drawing of Metaporana obtusa, 1888

Conservation status
- Vulnerable (IUCN 3.1)

Scientific classification
- Kingdom: Plantae
- Clade: Tracheophytes
- Clade: Angiosperms
- Clade: Eudicots
- Clade: Asterids
- Order: Solanales
- Family: Convolvulaceae
- Genus: Metaporana
- Species: M. obtusa

Binomial name
- Metaporana obtusa (Balf.f.) Staples

Synonyms
- Porana obtusa Balf.f.

= Metaporana obtusa =

Species of plant

Metaporana obtusa is a species of plant in the family Convolvulaceae endemic to Socotra in Yemen. Its natural habitat is subtropical or tropical dry forests.
