= Cumwhitton =

Village and civil parish in Cumbria, England

Coordinates: 54.850°N 2.766°W

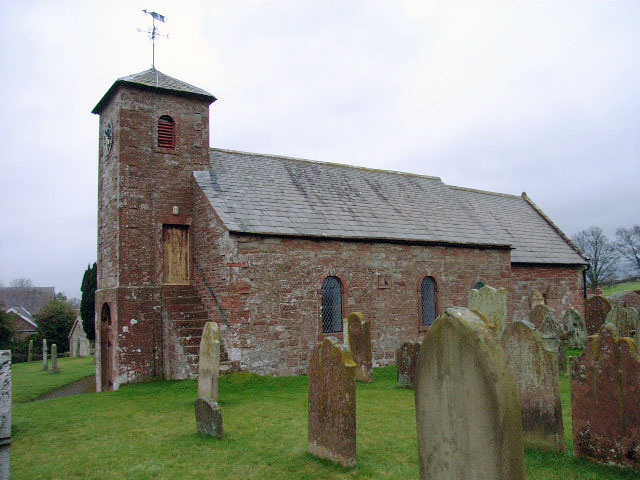
- St.Mary's Church, Cumwhitton

- Location within Cumbria
- Population: 282 (2021)
- OS grid reference: NY507508
- Civil parish: Cumwhitton
- Unitary authority: Cumberland
- Ceremonial county: Cumbria
- Region: North West
- Country: England
- Sovereign state: United Kingdom
- Post town: BRAMPTON
- Postcode district: CA8
- Dialling code: 01228
- Police: Cumbria
- Fire: Cumbria
- Ambulance: North West
- UK Parliament: Carlisle

Cumwhitton is a small village and civil parish close to Carlisle in Cumbria, England. It lies just east of the M6 and the nearest train station is located in Wetheral, 3 miles away. Cumwhitton is often confused with the nearby village of Cumwhinton in Wetheral parish. The population of the civil parish as taken at the 2021 Census was 282.

== The village ==
The current population of Cumwhitton, according to the 2001 census, is 293. There is a roughly even split of males to females, with 152 males and 141 females. There are 111 households within the small village.

=== Location ===
Cumwhitton is located in the north of Cumbria, in the North West of England. Cumwhitton is approximately 8.8 miles South East of Carlisle. The A69 is the main road that links Cumwhitton to Carlisle. The village is located on the East side of the River Eden which runs through Cumwhitton to Solway Firth.

=== St. Mary's Church ===
St. Mary's Church is a Grade II listed building. It dates back to, at least, the 12th century and was extensively rebuilt in the 19th century. St. Mary's Church is an ancient edifice. There are a variety of stained glass windows, most by unknown artists. The east window is probably Anglo-Saxon; the South wall is Norman; and the north arcade of three bays was built around 1200.

=== Leisure ===
Cumwhitton also has a caravan park (Cairndale Caravan Park) which is open from 1 March through to 31 October. The park has caravans to hire, and also has tent and caravan pitches

== History ==
=== Viking burial ground ===
In March 2004, a Cumbrian metal detectorist, Peter Adams, working found a brooch in the ploughsoil on farmland belonging to Townfoot Farm, on the western edge of Cumwhitton. This was identified as a rare Viking oval brooch of ninth- or tenth-century date. These are almost always found in pairs and in a burial context. They therefore returned to the site and subsequently found a second brooch. Given the rarity of these brooches in England, funding was secured for an evaluation of the findspot to ascertain whether they came from a grave. A grave was located and found to be furnished; the grave goods included the remains of a wooden box, laid at the feet of the deceased. Several more artefacts, including part of a sword, were found in the surrounding ploughsoil during the evaluation, suggesting that the grave had formed part of a cemetery. A major excavation to record this important site was then funded by English Heritage, as it was under immediate threat from plough damage.

In total, six burials were found, dating to the early tenth century, though almost no skeletal material survived as a result of the acidic nature of the soil. While osteological sexing was not possible, the grave goods suggested these were the burials of two women and four men, the first grave being separated from the rest by about 10 m. The group of five was carefully organised into two closely spaced rows, the central grave of the eastern row being surrounded by a shallow ditch, which suggests that it was once marked by a mound. All the graves were orientated broadly east–west, although how significant this was remains unclear. All the burials were richly furnished, and contained a wide range of artefacts, including swords, spearheads, spurs, knives, and numerous beads and other grave goods, implying that they were not Christian.

Some of the metalwork from the burials is clearly linked to Scandinavia, and in particular cases, like that of the oval brooches, is highly likely to have been made there. However, other artefacts, such as some of the textiles, seax, folding blades, and spurs, are of probable Insular manufacture. Many of the objects suggest a complexity in their manufacture, with elements derived from a multiplicity of sources. However other items, such as the buckle sets, suggest regional manufacture and provide the first evidence for either an individual craftsman or workshop in the local area.

The excavations were published in 2014 by Oxford Archaeology North in their Lancaster Imprints series: Shadows in the Sand: Excavation of a Viking-age cemetery at Cumwhitton, Cumbria, by Caroline Paterson, Adam J Parsons, Rachel M Newman, Nick Johnson, and Christine Howard Davis, Lancaster. It is intended that an exhibition of various artifacts will take place at the Tullie House Museum in Carlisle.

=== William James Blacklock ===
The landscape artist and lithographer William James Blacklock lived in Cumwhitton from 1818 to 1836 and from 1850 to 1854. He painted scenery in Cumbria, the Lake District, and the Scottish Borders. In 1818 Blacklock moved from London to Cumwhitton. He is believed to have lived in Cumwhitton House with his family. Blacklock moved back to London in 1836; but in 1850 his health deteriorated and he moved back to Cumwhitton. William James Blacklock died on 12 March 1858, and was buried on 16 March 1858 in Cumwhitton. Thirty-three pieces of Blacklock's work are on display at the Tullie House Museum and Art Gallery, Carlisle.

== See also ==
- Listed buildings in Cumwhitton
