= Elizabeth Crichton =

British philanthropist, founder of Chrichton Royal Hospital in Dumfries, Scotland

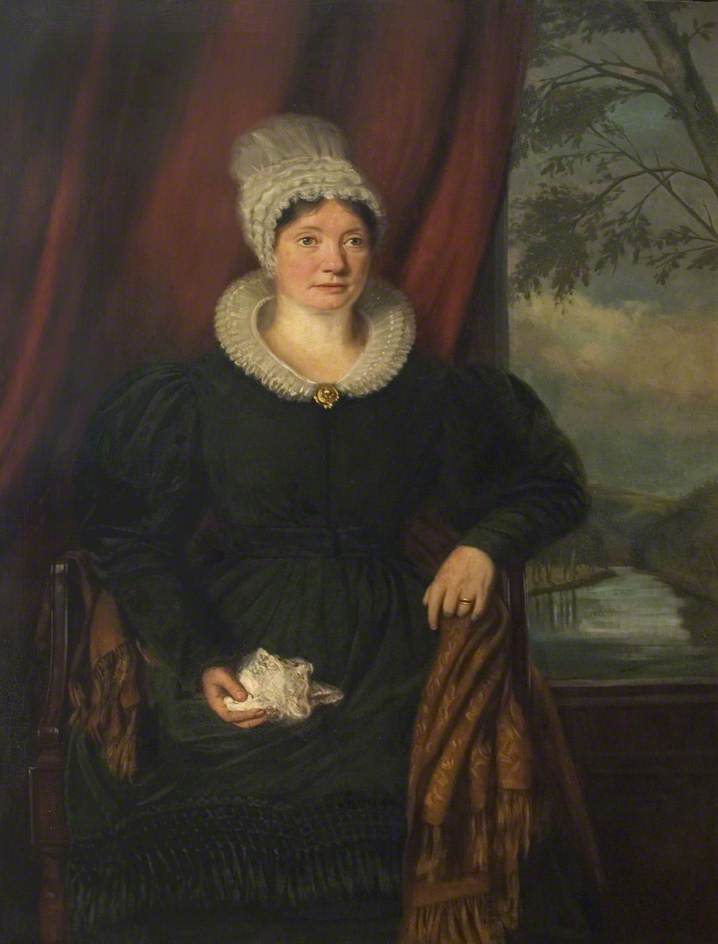
- Elizabeth Crichton by unknown artist
- Born: Elizabeth Grierson; 1779; Rockhall
- Died: 11 October 1862 (aged 82–83); Friars Carse
- Known for: Creating the Crichton Royal Hospital in Dumfries

Elizabeth Crichton (1779 – 1862) was a British philanthropist who founded the Crichton Royal Hospital in Dumfries. She had wanted to create a university but it was opened instead as the Crichton Institution for Lunatics in 1839. It now holds part of several universities and in her memory: a cathedral like church and her statue.

== Life ==
Crichton was born in Rockhall in 1779 to Margaret Dalzell and Sir Robert Grierson fifth baronet. In 1810 she married James Crichton who had qualified as a doctor at Edinburgh University but whose fortune was made after he had joined the East India Company. He practised medicine but it was his trading in India and China that left Elizabeth a rich widow. He had left £100,000 and his widow was allowed to spend it on any project agreed by the trustees.

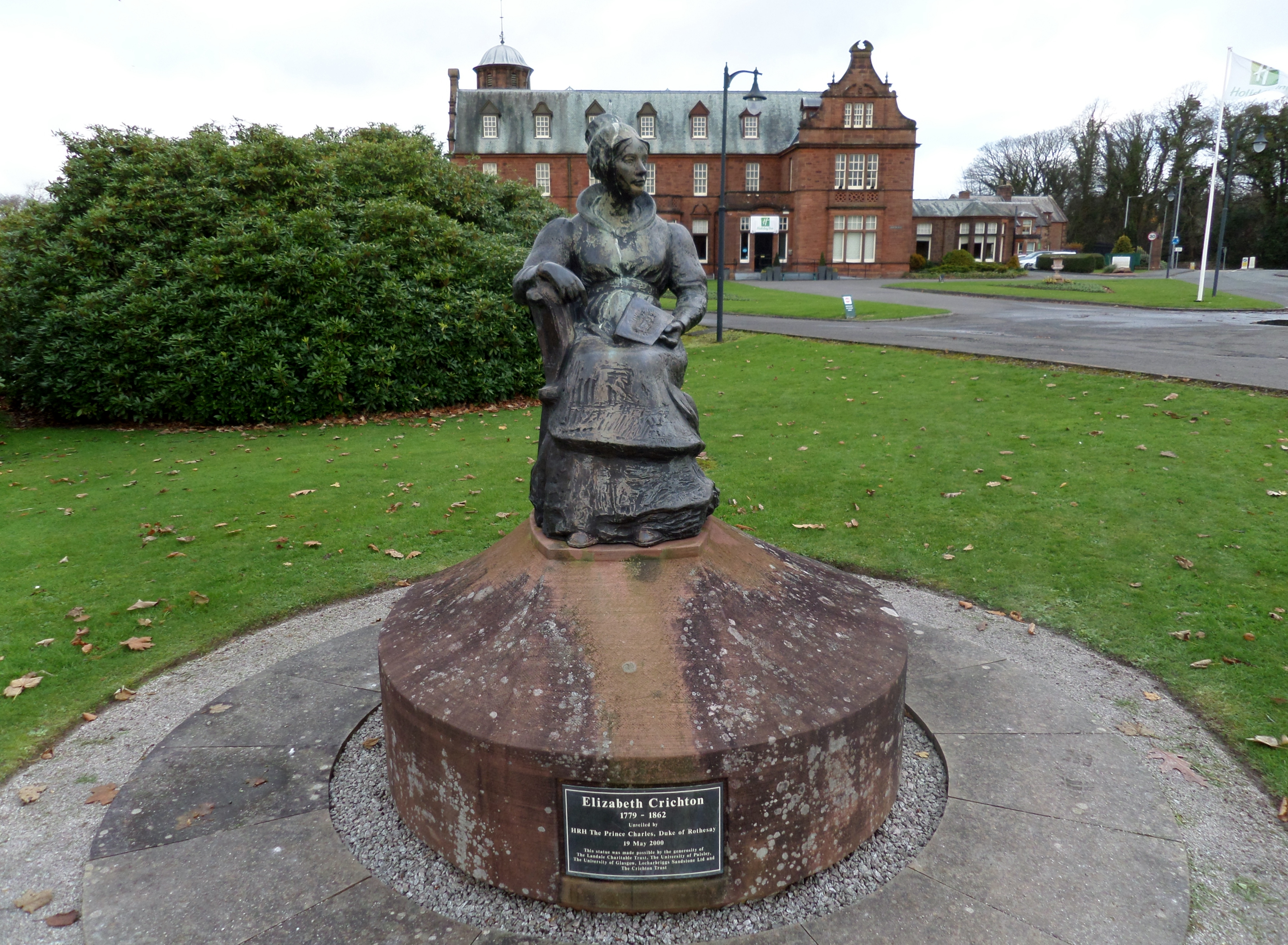
Elizabeth Crichton Statue at Crichton Royal Hospital

It was said that she wanted to create a university in Dumfries but she was prevented by the existing Scottish universities. The original hospital building, now The Crichton, was designed by William Burn and opened as the Crichton Institution for Lunatics in 1839. It became the Crichton Royal Institution in 1840. The Southern Counties Asylum, which was intended to provide facilities for paupers, was erected on the site in 1849 and subsequently amalgamated with the main facility.

Crichton persuaded the phrenologist William A. F. Browne to become Crichton's medical superintendent and to implement his ideas of both occupational therapy and art therapy. She travelled to Montrose Asylum, interviewed Browne and offered him the equivalent post at the Crichton Royal in Dumfries. Browne remained at the Crichton for almost twenty years (1838-1857) setting new standards in therapeutic administration. In 1843 the hospital staged a theatre production where all the actors and musicians were patients and the following year the patients started a paper, New Moon, that was published for the next 92 years. The patients would be taken on picnics and Crichton would visit regularly to hear of Crichton Hall's progress.

Crichton Memorial Church is a huge building that was built as a memorial to her and her husband fifty years after the creation of the foundation that they had created. It was designed by Sydney Mitchell and construction lasted from 1890 to 1897. A statue of her was unveiled in May 2000 near to the Crichton Memorial Church in Dumfries. The statue is by Bill Scott and is one of the small number of memorials to women in Scotland.
