= 1780 in science =

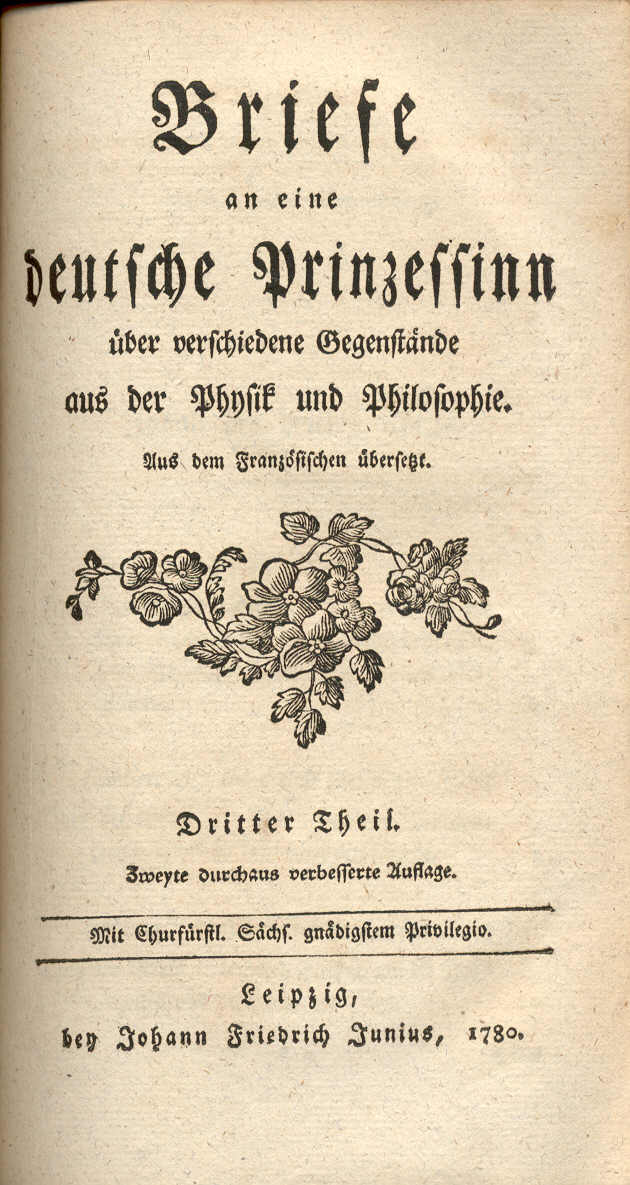

The year 1780 in science and technology involved some significant events.

== Biology ==
- Clément Joseph Tissot publishes Gymnastique médicinale et chirurgicale, ou, essai sur l'utilité du mouvement, ou des différens exercices du corps, et du repos dans la cure des malades in Paris, the first text on the therapeutic benefits of physical exercise.
- Lazzaro Spallanzani publishes Dissertationi di fisica animale e vegetale, first interpreting the process of animal digestion as a chemical process in the stomach, by action of gastric juice. He also carries out important researches on animal fertilization.

== Chemistry ==
- Lactose is identified as a sugar by Carl Wilhelm Scheele.

== Physics ==
- Jean-Paul Marat publishes Recherches physiques sur le feu (Research into the Physics of Fire) and Découvertes de M. Marat sur la lumière (Mr Marat's Discoveries on Light).

== History of science ==
- Dr John Aikin publishes his Biographical Memoirs of Medicine in Great Britain, the first English language historical dictionary of physicians.

== Technology ==
- Aimé Argand invents the Argand lamp.
- Thomas Earnshaw devises the spring detent escapement for marine chronometers.

== Awards ==
- Copley Medal: Samuel Vince

== Births ==
- January 13 – Pierre Jean Robiquet, French chemist (died 1840).
- March 10 – William Charles Ellis, English psychiatric physician (died 1839).
- April 13 – Alexander Mitchell, Irish engineer and inventor of the screw-pile lighthouse (died 1868).
- September 5 - Clarke Abel, British surgeon and naturalist (died 1826).
- December 26 – Mary Somerville, British scientific writer (died 1872).
- Elizabeth Philpot, English paleontologist (died 1857).

== Deaths ==
- January 22 – André Levret, French obstetrician (born 1703).
- February 20 – Johannes Burman, Dutch botanist (born 1707).
- October 17 – William Cookworthy, English chemist (born 1705).
