= Dumfries and Galloway College =

Coordinates: 55.039°N 3.571°W

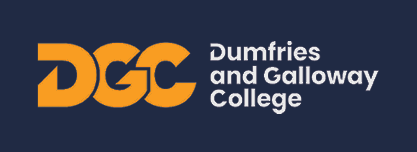
- Motto: One step ahead
- Type: College of further and higher education
- Established: 1961
- Principal: Douglas Dickson
- Students: 4,500 students per year average
- Location: Dumfries and Stranraer, Dumfries & Galloway, Scotland
- Campus: Crichton Campus Dumfries and Stranraer,
- Colours: Navy blue and orange
- Website: https://www.dumgal.ac.uk/

Dumfries and Galloway College is a further education college in Dumfries and Galloway, with campuses in Dumfries and Stranraer.

Founded in 1961, the college has flourished to become a leading voice in green energy skills development to help tackle climate change and one of the main providers of learning and training across the South of Scotland. The college offers programmes ranging from senior-phase school partnerships to higher education, with a range of courses, including business, computing, care, childcare, construction, creative industries, education, engineering, hairdressing, beauty and complementary therapies, health and social studies, hospitality and sports and recreation.

In 2008 their campus moved from Heathhall to its new main campus on the Crichton Estate, sitting nearby the University of Glasgow's and the University of the West of Scotland's satellite faculties in Dumfries.

The college was recognised at the 2021 Green Gown Awards, winning the accolade of the UK and Ireland's Sustainability Institution of the Year award for 2020 and it regularly boasts of high student satisfaction rates - 97% among further education students and 94% among higher education students in the most recent 2018-19 Student Satisfaction and Engagement survey conducted by the Scottish Funding Council. This places Dumfries and Galloway College in the top 5 institutions in Scotland for student satisfaction.
