= William A. F. Browne =

British asylum doctor (1805–1885)

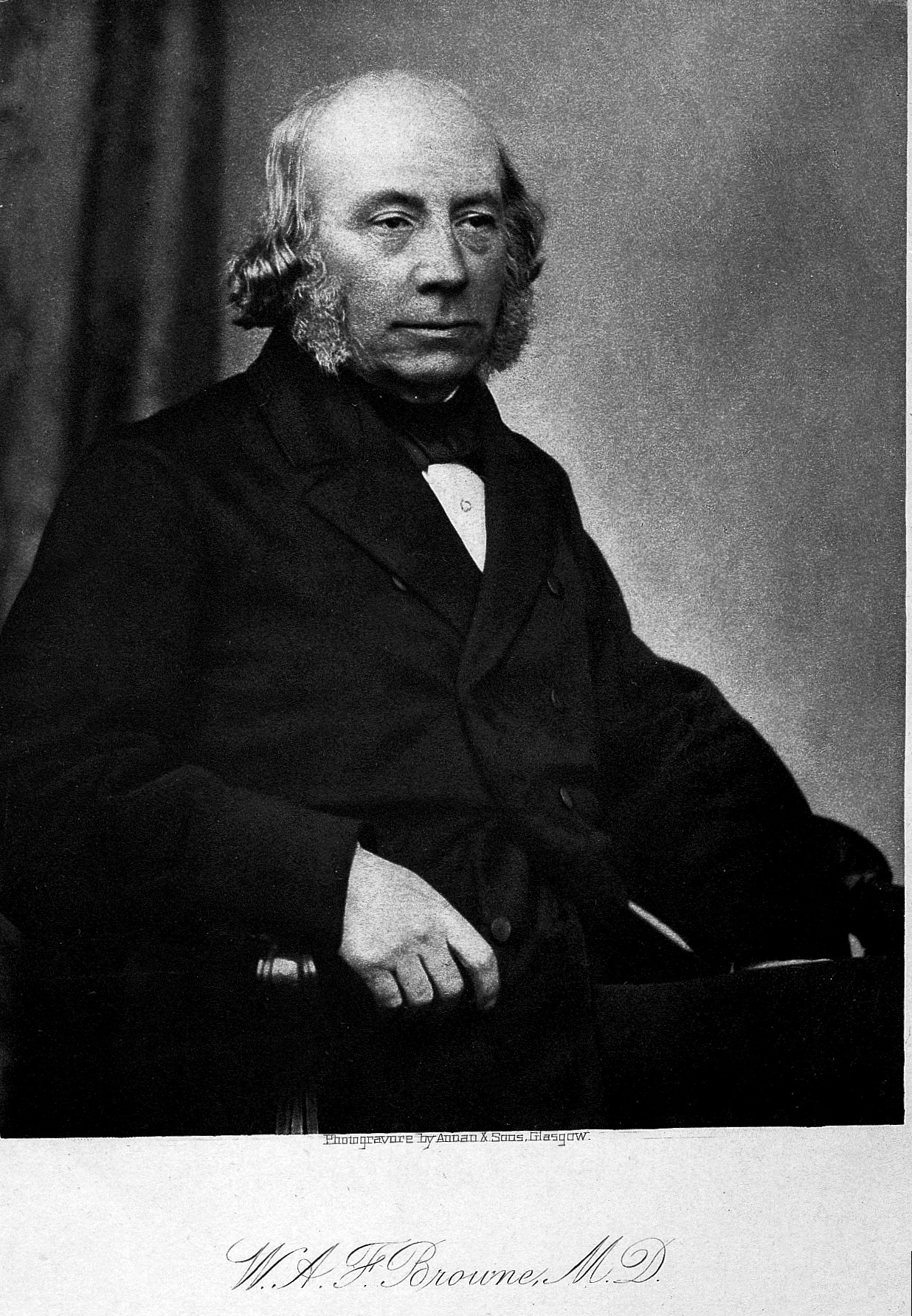

Dr William Alexander Francis Browne (1805–1885) was one of the most significant British asylum doctors of the nineteenth century. At Montrose Asylum (1834–1838) in Angus and at the Crichton Royal in Dumfries (1838–1857), Browne introduced activities for patients including writing, group activity and drama, pioneered early forms of occupational therapy and art therapy, and initiated one of the earliest collections of artistic work by patients in a psychiatric hospital. In an age which rewarded self-control, Browne encouraged self-expression and may therefore be counted alongside William Tuke, Vincenzo Chiarugi and John Conolly as one of the pioneers of the moral treatment of mental illness. Sociologist Andrew Scull has identified Browne's career with the institutional triumph of nineteenth century psychiatry.

"In language all-too-revelatory of the political issues at stake, [Browne] denounced 'he who refuses the aid of medicine....as he who doubts the efficacy of moral agents'....ln the final analysis, one might abandon the millenarian expectations on which Victorian asylumdom had been mistakenly constructed - but not betray one's commitment to the medical monopolization of the treatment of the mad...." Andrew Scull (1991) The Asylum As Utopia: W A F Browne and the Mid-Nineteenth Century Consolidation of Psychiatry

"Browne was one of the reformers of the asylum care of the insane whose improvements and innovations were chronicled in his annual reports from The Crichton Royal Institution, but who in addition published almost on the threshold of his career a sort of manifesto of what he wished to see accomplished...." Richard Hunter and Ida Macalpine (1963) Three Hundred Years of Psychiatry 1535–1860, page 865.

In 1857, Browne was appointed Commissioner in Lunacy for Scotland and, in 1866, he was elected President of the Medico-Psychological Association, now the Royal College of Psychiatrists. He was the father of the eminent psychiatrist James Crichton-Browne.

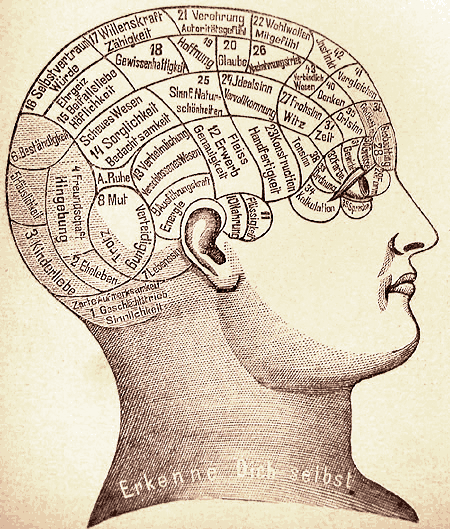
Browne's enthusiasm for phrenology convinced him that mind and consciousness were aspects of brain activity.

== Early life ==
Browne was the son of an army officer – Lieutenant William Browne of the Cameronian Regiment – who drowned in a troopship disaster (the Aurora on the Goodwin Sands) in December 1805. After this upheaval, Browne was brought up on his maternal grandparents' farm at Polmaise, near Stirling, attending Stirling High School and Edinburgh University. As a medical student, Browne was fascinated by phrenology and Lamarckian evolution, joining the Edinburgh Phrenological Society on 1 April 1824, and taking an active part in the Plinian Society with Robert Edmond Grant and Charles Darwin in 1826 and the Spring of 1827. Here, Browne presented materialist concepts of the mind as a process of the brain. Browne's amalgamation of phrenology with Lamarckian concepts of evolution anticipated – by some years – the approach of Robert Chambers in his Vestiges of the Natural History of Creation (1844). The furious arguments which Browne provoked at the Plinian Society in 1826/1827 gave ample warning to Charles Darwin, then aged 17/18, of the growing tensions between science and religious beliefs.

== Student atheism and radicalism ==
"Mr Browne then read his paper on organization as connected with Life and Mind in which he endeavoured to establish the following propositions: 1. That all matter is organised. 2. That it is the gradually increased perfection in the arrangement of the parts constituting organization, which is the ?cause /?source of the distinctions perceptible in the various objects of nature, and not specific differences. 3. That life is the abstract of the qualities inherent in these modes of arranging matter. 4. That mind is to be distinguished from life, being neither one of the functions or combination of qualities, by the concatenation of which life is constituted – nor a term indicating a similar idea. And 5. That mind as far as one individual sense, and consciousness are concerned, is material." The Deleted Minutes, The Plinian Society, Edinburgh, 27 March 1827. Suppressed, probably by Robert Jameson, Regius Professor of Natural History. First quoted by Paul H. Barrett (1974, 1980) (in) Metaphysics, Materialism and the Evolution of Mind – early writings of Charles Darwin London and Chicago: University of Chicago Press, page 219.

"Browne, the fiery radical, gave such an inflammatory harangue on matter and mind that it sparked a raging debate. He provoked the students by arguing that mind and consciousness are not spiritual entities, separate from the body; they are simple spin-offs from brain activity. Such a notion raised dreadful questions...." Adrian Desmond and James Moore (1991) Darwin.

As a medical student, Browne was a Radical and an atheist, welcoming the changes in revolutionary France, and supporting democratic reform to overturn the Church, monarchy, and aristocracy. In addition, Browne was an outspoken advocate of phrenology which George and Andrew Combe had developed into a form of philosophical materialism, asserting that the mind was an outcome of material properties of the brain. Through phrenological meetings, Browne became acquainted with a remarkable group of secular and interdisciplinary thinkers, including Hewett Cottrell Watson (an evolutionary thinker and friend of Charles Darwin), William Ballantyne Hodgson and Robert Chambers, author of Vestiges of the Natural History of Creation. His interest in natural history led to his membership of the Plinian Society, where he took part in vigorous debates concerning phrenology and early evolutionary theories and became one of the five joint presidents of this student club. The leader of the phrenologists, George Combe, toasted Browne for his success in popularising phrenology with other medical students.

Browne presented Plinian papers on various subjects, including plants he had collected, the habits of the cuckoo, the aurora borealis, and ghosts. On 21 November 1826, he proposed Charles Darwin for membership of the Plinian Society. On the same evening, Browne announced a paper which he presented in December 1826, contesting Charles Bell's Anatomy and Philosophy of Expression. Bell, the son of a clergyman and an enormously influential neurologist, claimed, in line with the principles of natural theology, that the Creator had endowed human beings with a unique facial musculature which enabled them to express their higher moral nature in a way which was impossible in animals. Bell's aphorism on the subject was:

expression is to the passions as language is to thought.

—

Browne argued that these anatomical differences were lacking and that such essential differences between human beings and animals did not exist. Forty-five years later, Darwin pursued an identical argument in his The Expression of the Emotions in Man and Animals (1872), confiding in Alfred Russel Wallace that one of his main purposes was to discredit the slippery rhetoric of Sir Charles Bell.

Later, at a Plinian meeting on 27 March 1827, Browne followed Darwin's paper on marine invertebrates and Dr Robert Edmund Grant's exposition on sea-mats with a presentation that mind and consciousness were simply aspects of brain activity. This programme of three papers presented an ascending view of life's complexities from the marine invertebrates beloved of Grant to the ultimate mysteries of human consciousness, all on a scientific platform of evolutionary development. In addition, Browne appeared to present a view of the world which was politically and morally at odds with the opinions of the educational establishment. A furious debate ensued, and subsequently someone (probably the crypto-Lamarckian Robert Jameson, Regius Professor of Natural History) took the extraordinary step of deleting the minutes of this heretical part of the discussion. The deletion, however, was incomplete and has allowed a final restoration of the proceedings. The extreme impact of these events is indicated by the fact that a friend of Browne's – John Coldstream – developed an emotional disturbance which his doctor attributed to his being

"troubled with doubts arising from certain Materialist views which are, alas, all too common among medical students."

After graduating at Edinburgh, Browne travelled to Paris and studied psychiatry with Jean-Étienne Dominique Esquirol at the Salpêtrière.

"One is tempted to believe phrenologists are right about habitual exercise of the mind altering form of [the] head, & thus these qualities become hereditary...." Charles Darwin (1838) The M Notebook .

"I have been making immense use almost every day of your manuscript – the book ought to be called by Darwin and Browne ?" Charles Darwin to James Crichton Browne, concerning the composition of The Expression of the Emotions in Man and Animals (1872).

== Early psychiatric career ==
Browne became a physician at Stirling in 1830, and gave lectures on physiology and zoology at the Edinburgh Association which was formed in 1832 by the town's tradesmen. He also travelled in continental Europe. In 1832–1834, Browne published a lengthy paper in the Phrenological Journal concerning the relationship of language to mental disorder and in 1834 he was appointed superintendent of Montrose Lunatic Asylum. On 24 June 1834, Browne married Magdalene Balfour, from one of Scotland's foremost scientific families and sister of John Hutton Balfour (1808–1884), and they were to have eight children, the second of whom was James Crichton-Browne (1840–1938), an eminent psychiatrist of the later Victorian period. Browne gave frequent lectures on the reform of mental institutions, often expressing himself in surprisingly political/reformist terms – like a sociological visionary. In 1837, five lectures he had delivered before the Managers of Montrose Lunatic Asylum were published under the title What Asylums Were, Are, and Ought To Be, setting out his ideas of the ideal asylum of the future and, in many ways, Browne sought to arrest – or even to reverse – the social consequences of the widespread industrialisation which had disrupted the Scottish culture of his childhood.

"Conceive of a spacious building resembling the palace of a peer, airy, and elevated, and elegant, surrounded by extensive and swelling grounds and gardens. The interior is fitted up with galleries, and workshops, and music-rooms. The sun and air are allowed to enter at every window, the view of the shrubberies and fields, and groups of labourers, is unobstructed by shutters or bars; all is clean, quiet and attractive. The inmates all seem to be motivated by the common impulse of enjoyment, all are busy, and delighted by being so. The house and all around appears a hive of industry"....

— W.A.F.Browne (1837) What Asylums Were, Are and Ought To Be.

In this influential book, Browne challenged the contemporary perception that insanity was a simple consequence of the social upheavals consequent upon the Industrial Revolution – and claimed that insanity was increasing because

"the mind is roused to exertion without being disciplined, it is stimulated without being strengthened; because our selfish propensities are cultivated while our moral nature is left barren, our pleasures becoming poisonous; and because in the midst of a blaze of scientific light, and in the presence of a thousand temptations to multiply our immediate by a sacrifice of our ultimate gratifications, we remain in the darkest ignorance of our own mind."

In some ways, Browne anticipated the French psychiatrist Bénédict Morel whose clinical theories of degeneration were published in his 1857 masterpiece Treatise on Degeneration. Browne – rather surprisingly – supported the idea that insanity was most prevalent amongst the highest rank of society and he concluded that "the agricultural population..... is to a great degree exempt from insanity". He speculated that insanity was common in America because

the refuse of other nations has been poured forth. ... the tide of population, which has been flowing for so many years uninterruptedly towards America, has been impure and poisoned.

He also suggested that the higher incidence of mental illness amongst women was the result of inequalities and poorer education. On the basis of his studies of inmates of his hospital, he asserted that those canonised in the past as saints for their hyperactive organ of veneration would now be categorised as insane.

== Crichton Royal: Moral Treatment and Therapeutic Approaches ==
"....Browne persisted, even insisting on the first lighting of the Montrose asylum with gas in 1836, an event which prompted the assembly of a crowd at the gate to witness and perhaps to enjoy the conflagration which was expected inevitably to follow.... The asylum did not burn down. On the contrary, it flourished in Browne's hands as never before...."

— Andrew Scull (1991) The Asylum as Utopia: W.A.F. Browne and the Mid-Nineteenth Century Consolidation of Psychiatry London and New York: Tavistock/Routledge, page xiv.

"Dr Browne's Annual Reports form the only Reports of the Institution during his period of office. They are printed by the Dumfries Herald, except for the 13th Report (for 1852) printed by the Crichton Press.... The first patient is admitted on 4 June 1839 – a female pauper from the North Block of the old Dumfries and Galloway Royal Infirmary....it is of interest to note that this patient recovers five years later, in May 1844...."

— Charles Cromhall Easterbrook (1940) The Chronicle of Crichton Royal (1833–1936), page 21.

"Where there is a work of art, there is no madness."

— Michel Foucault Madness and Civilization, quoted by Dr Maureen Park (2010) (in) Art in Madness: Dr W.A.F. Browne's Collection of Patient Art at Crichton Royal Institution, Dumfries, page xv.

"Moved by early predilection – my father, a phrenologist of the old school, was assistant to George Combe at his lectures for a time, and was also for some years one of the Henderson trustees – I have dipped into that old controversy and....this I will say, that from our point of view today, the phrenologists, notwithstanding their egregious errors, had the best of it both in argument and temper."

— James Crichton-Browne The Story of the Brain Lecture delivered in Edinburgh, Friday 29 February 1924.

Browne was a passionate advocate of the moral treatment of the insane and he hated any suggestion of prejudice against the mentally ill.

"There is in this community no compulsion, no chains, no corporal chastisement, simply because these are proved to be less effectual means of carrying any point than persuasion, emulation, and the desire of earning gratification... such is a faithful picture of what may be seen in many institutions, and of what might be seen in all, were asylums conducted as they ought to be."

— William A.F. Browne (1837) What Asylums Were, Are, and Ought To Be.

In 1838 the wealthy philanthropist Elizabeth Crichton persuaded Browne to accept the position of physician superintendent of her newly constructed Crichton Royal Hospital in Dumfries. Here he encouraged his patients with writing, art and drama and a host of other activities, long anticipating the clinical approaches of occupational therapy and art therapy. He made regular records of his patients' dreams, and of their social activities and groupings. Elizabeth Crichton would have monthly meetings with him. In 1855, the Crichton was visited by the celebrated American reformer Dorothea Dix and she seems to have struck up a positive relationship with Magdalene Browne, taking an interest in her traditional Scottish cuisine, before moving on to her Edinburgh friends, Mr and Mrs Robert Chambers. Browne remained at the Crichton until 1857 when his outstanding reputation resulted in his appointment as the first Medical Commissioner to the Scottish asylums. In 1861 he was elected a member of the Harveian Society of Edinburgh. In 1866, he was elected President of the Medico-Psychological Association, and he used his Presidential Address as an opportunity to spell out (at considerable length) his concepts of medical psychology.

In 1870, while visiting asylums in East Lothian, Browne was involved in a road accident which resulted in his resignation as Commissioner in Lunacy, and, later, in increasing problems with his eyesight. He may have been suffering some ophthalmic problems, probably glaucoma, from years earlier. Browne retired to his home in Dumfries and worked on a series of medico-literary projects, including the Religio Psycho-Medici (1877) in which he re-explored the territories of psychopathology and the spiritual outlook.

Towards the end of his career, Browne returned to the relationships of language, psychosis and brain injury in his 1872 paper Impairment of Language, the Result of Cerebral Disease published in the West Riding Lunatic Asylum Medical Reports, edited by his son James Crichton-Browne. At this time, Crichton-Browne was concluding a lengthy correspondence with Charles Darwin during the preparation and publication of The Expression of the Emotions in Man and Animals.

In 1839, Browne had initiated one of the first collections of art by mental patients in institutions, gathering a large amount of work which he had bound into three volumes, in many ways a forerunner to Hans Prinzhorn's Artistry of the Mentally Ill and the academic study of outsider art (art brut). A paper by Browne on Mad Artists was published in 1880 in the Journal of Psychological Medicine and Mental Pathology, setting out his views on mental illness and the effect it had on established artists. Browne's last years were clouded by the death of his wife in January 1882 and by his increasing blindness; but he lived to hear of his son's achievements in medical psychology rewarded by his election – in 1883 – as a Fellow of the Royal Society.

== W.A.F. Browne's legacy ==
Universally regarded as a superb asylum superintendent and as a distinguished President of the Medico-Psychological Association (1866), Browne's reputation rested substantially on his achievements as an asylum reformer – with acute responsiveness to the psychological lives of his patients. Browne's early writings on asylum management – including his celebrated What Asylums Were, Are and Ought To Be – brought him international recognition, with honorary doctorates from Heidelberg and Wisconsin. He was also elected a Fellow of the Royal Society of Edinburgh.

Browne is now considered as an important influence – along with Robert Grant – on the youthful Charles Darwin as a medical student in Edinburgh in 1826/1827. In December 1826, Browne delivered an inflammatory harangue to the Plinian Society concerning emotional expression – contesting the doctrines of Charles Bell. On 27 March 1827, Browne spelled out the full implications of a materialistic theory of the mind at the Plinian Society – and the 18-year-old Charles Darwin was there to hear on both occasions. In this way, Browne was a pivotal figure in the mutual engagement of psychiatry and evolutionary theory. Browne's son, James Crichton Browne, greatly extended his work in psychiatry and medical psychology. In his correspondence with Crichton-Browne, Charles Darwin suggested – during the preparation of The Expression of the Emotions in Man and Animals (1872) – that it should be regarded as "by Darwin and Browne?".
