= John Hutton Balfour =

Scottish botanist (1808–1884)

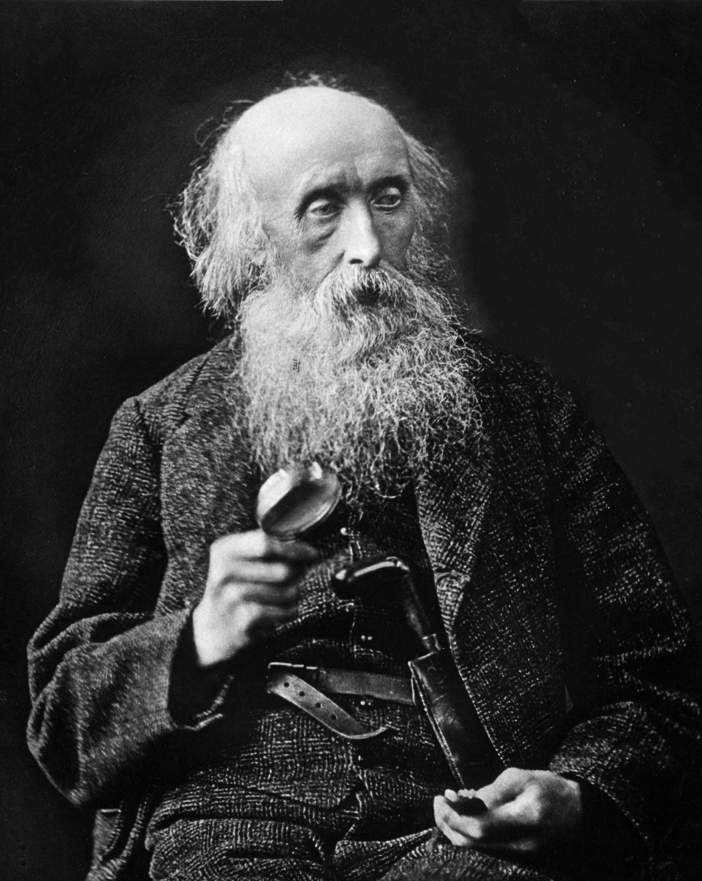
- Balfour in 1878
- Born: 15 September 1808; Edinburgh, Scotland, UK
- Died: 11 February 1884 (aged 75); Inverleith House, Edinburgh, Scotland, UK
- Education: Royal High School, University of St Andrews and University of Edinburgh
- Spouse: Marion Spottiswood Bayley
- Children: 8; including Isaac Bayley Balfour
- Scientific career
- Fields: botany
- Workplaces: Royal Botanic Garden Edinburgh, Botanical Society of Edinburgh, Oxford University
- Author abbrev. (botany): Balf.

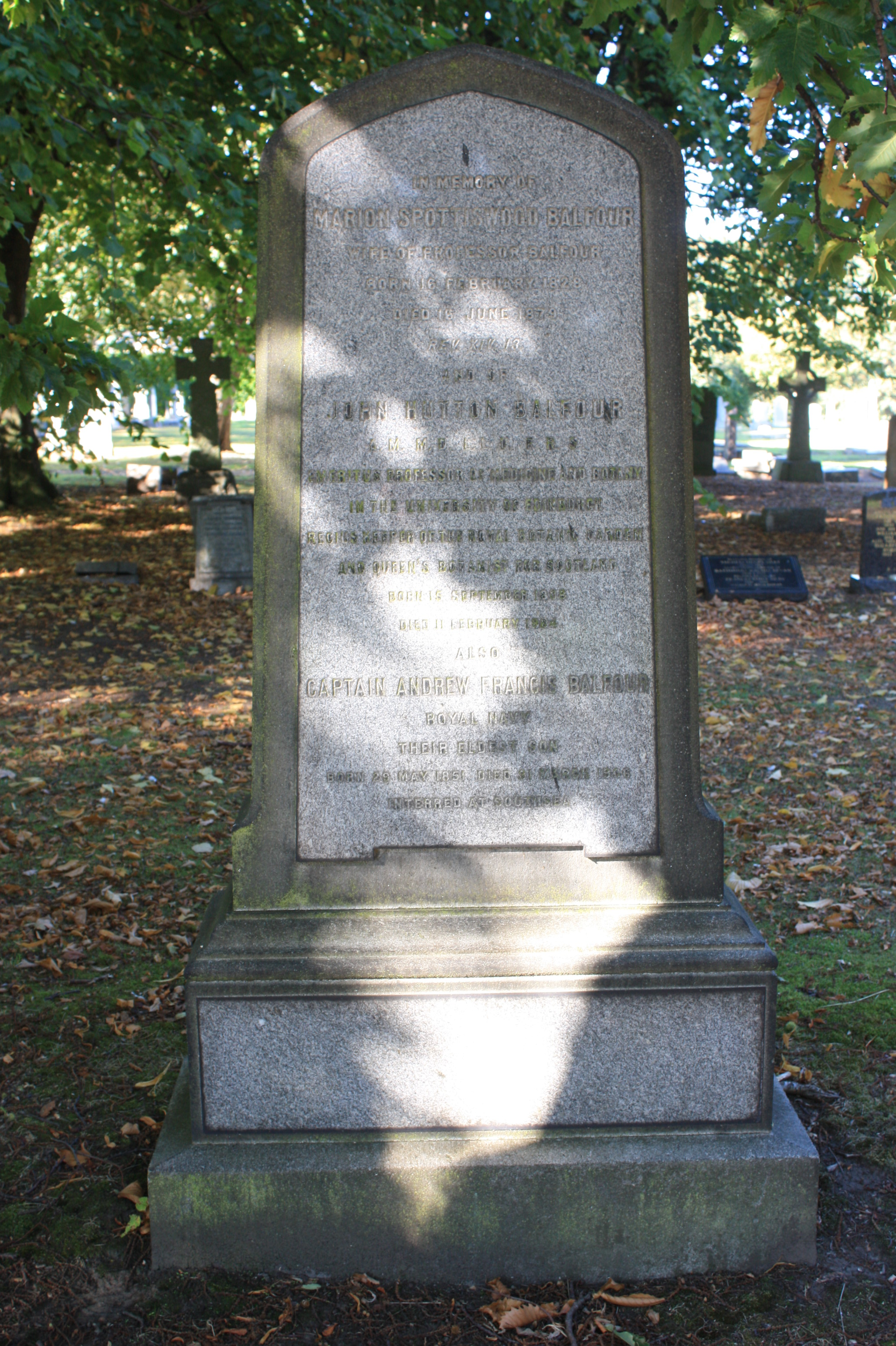
The grave of John Hutton Balfour, Warriston Cemetery, Edinburgh

John Hutton Balfour FRSE FRS FRCSE FLS MWS (15 September 1808 – 11 February 1884) was a Scottish botanist. Balfour became a Professor of Botany, first at the University of Glasgow in 1841, moving to the University of Edinburgh and also becoming the 7th Regius Keeper of the Royal Botanic Garden Edinburgh and Her Majesty's Botanist in 1845. He held these posts until his retirement in 1879. He was nicknamed Woody Fibre.

== Early life ==
He was the son of Andrew Balfour, an Army Surgeon who had returned to Edinburgh to set up a printing and publishing business.

Balfour was educated at the Royal High School in Edinburgh and then studied at St Andrews University and the University of Edinburgh, graduating with degrees of M.A. and then M.D., the latter in 1832. In Edinburgh, he became a notable member of the Plinian Society, where he encountered the phrenologist William A.F. Browne and entered the vigorous debates concerning natural history and theology. His original intention had been to seek ordination in the Church of Scotland but instead he started medical practice in Edinburgh in 1834 after studying abroad.

In 1834 Balfour was elected a member of the Harveian Society of Edinburgh and served as President in 1852. He was elected a Fellow of the Royal Society of Edinburgh in January 1835, aged only 26. He was one of their longest serving members. He was General Secretary 1860–1879 and Vice President 1881-3.

== Botany ==
With an interest in botany, Balfour was prominent in the foundation of both the Botanical Society of Edinburgh in 1836 (serving as President in 1845–46) and the Edinburgh Botanical Club in 1838.

In 1841 he began giving lectures in Edinburgh's extramural school on botany with some success. In 1842 he was appointed Professor of Botany at the University of Glasgow. In 1845, Balfour transferred to take the chair of Botany at the University of Edinburgh, a position he held until 1879. He was also nominated keeper of the Royal Botanic Garden in Edinburgh and Her Majesty's Botanist. These appointments followed a protracted political struggle in which Balfour triumphed over his distinguished opponent, Joseph Dalton Hooker, a close associate of Charles Darwin. In 1846 he was elected a member of the Aesculapian Club.

Balfour served for many years as dean of the faculty of medicine in the University of Edinburgh and he was a teacher of botany, lacing his scientific lectures with theological asides, as he remained profoundly wedded to natural theology. In January 1862, he corresponded with Charles Darwin on botanical matters, recollecting their evenings together at the Plinian Society with his brother-in-law William A.F. Browne. He also corresponded with botanist Hewett Cottrell Watson, an early phrenologist, evolutionist and advocate of the differential development of the human cerebral hemispheres.

Under Balfour's care the Royal Botanic Garden was enlarged and improved and a palm-house, arboretum, and teaching accommodation were built. His publications include botanical text-books such as Manual of Botany (1848), Class Book of Botany (1852), Outlines of Botany (1854), Elements of Botany for Schools (1869), Botanist's Companion (1860), Introduction to Palaeontological Botany (1872), and The Plants of Scripture. He also contributed to the article on botany in the 8th edition of Encyclopædia Britannica. Balfour retired from his academic post in 1879. His son, Sir Isaac Bayley Balfour (1853–1922), became a distinguished botanist in his own right, serving as Sherardian Professor of Botany at Oxford University from 1884 to 1888, before returning to his father's old Chair at Edinburgh.

California's foxtail pine is named Pinus balfouriana Balf. after him.

== Later life ==
From 1877 he lived in Inverleith House within the then newly extended Royal Botanic Gardens, Edinburgh in his role there as Regius Keeper.

He died in Inverleith House and was buried in Warriston Cemetery with his wife Marion Spottiswood Balfour. The grave lies on the north side of the main upper east-west path, towards its western end.

== Family ==
He married Marion Spottiswood Bayley (1828–1879) on 8 August 1848. Their children were Ada Marion Spottiswood Balfour (1850–1918), Cpt. Andrew Francis Balfour RN (1851–1906), Isaac Bayley Balfour (1853–1922), Madeline Drummond Balfour (1854–1912), John Hutton Balfour Jr (1856–1919), George Goldie Balfour (1858–1914), Margaret Eliza Balfour (1860–1932) and Harriet Penuel Balfour (1863–1942).

Balfour's sister, Magdelene Balfour, married William A. F. Browne (1805–1885), the phrenologist and asylum reformer.

Balfour was uncle to Sir Andrew Balfour specialist in tropical medicine who was the first Director of the London School of Hygiene & Tropical Medicine in 1923 and was a close friend of Sir Patrick Manson, founder of the School. According to Sir Andrew Balfour in a speech he made to the London Royal Free Hospital, School of Medicine for Women in 1928, John Hutton Balfour was often referred as 'Woody Fibre'.

His great-great-granddaughter is actress Tilda Swinton.
