= Inverleith House =

Architectural structure in City of Edinburgh, Scotland

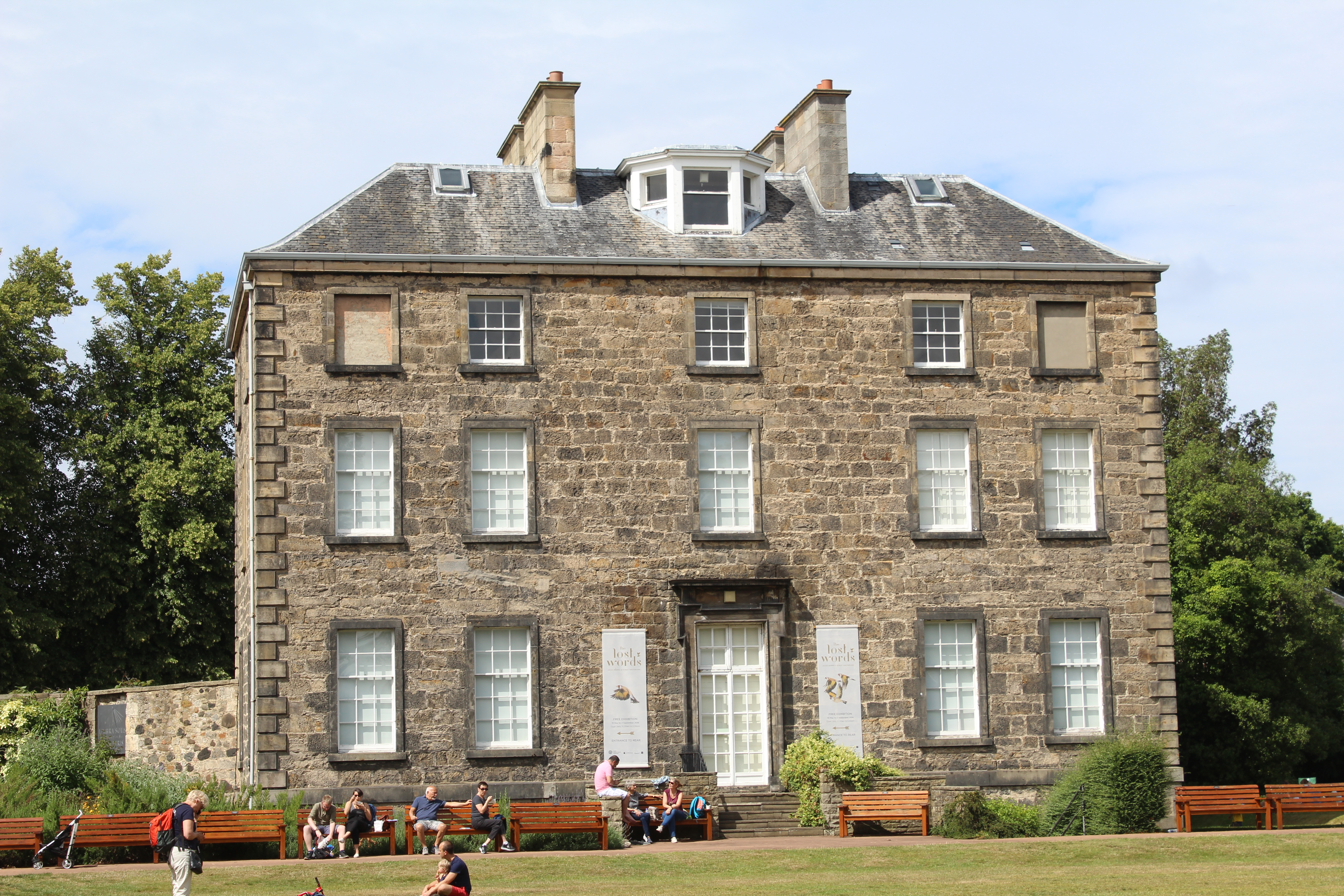

- Location within the City of Edinburgh council area

General information
- Location: Inverleith, Edinburgh, Arboretum Road and Inverleith Row, Edinburgh EH3 5NZ, Scotland
- Coordinates: 55.9650°N 3.2102°W
- Construction started: 1774
- Client: James Rocheid

Design and construction
- Architect: David Henderson

Website
- rbge.org.uk/inverleith-house

Inverleith House is a historic house, now within the Royal Botanic Garden, in the suburb of Inverleith, in Edinburgh, Scotland.

== History ==
Inverleith House was designed in 1773 by David Henderson and built for James Rocheid in 1774. In about 1820 a part of the Inverleith estate was sold to become the Royal Botanic Garden. The house was bought by the city in 1877 together with another part of the estate and, after restoration work following a fire, became the official residence of the Regius Keeper (director) of the Royal Botanic Garden. From 1960 it housed the new Scottish National Gallery of Modern Art, which in 1984 moved to the building of the former John Watson's Institution on Belford Road. On 4 December 1970 the house was listed as a historic building in category B, with Historic Scotland id 28081. An extension was built in 1974. Since 1986 the house has been used as exhibition space by the Royal Botanic Garden. Exhibitions of botanical and contemporary art are held there.

It was refurbished in 1990 and again in 2004, with support from National Lottery Funds administered by The Scottish Arts Council, which also supports the exhibitions programme.
