= Sunnyside Royal Hospital =

- NHS Tayside
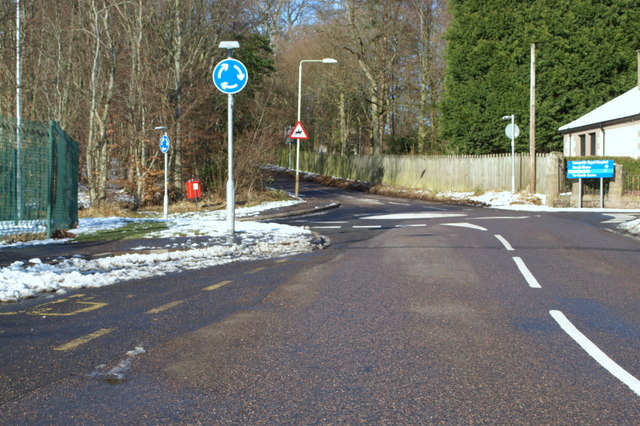
- The south entrance to Sunnyside Royal Hospital (on the right)

- Shown in Angus

Geography
- Location: Hillside, Montrose, Angus, Scotland
- Coordinates: 56°44′47″N 2°28′46″W

Organisation
- Care system: NHS Scotland
- Type: Specialist

Services
- Emergency department: No
- Speciality: Mental health

History
- Founded: 1781
- Closed: 2011

Links
- Lists: Hospitals in Scotland

Sunnyside Royal Hospital was a psychiatric hospital located in Hillside, north of Montrose, Scotland. It closed in 2011 and is now used for housing.

== History ==
The hospital was founded in 1781 by Susan Carnegie as the Montrose Lunatic Asylum, Infirmary & Dispensary and obtained a Royal Charter in 1810. The original building was situated on the Montrose Links on a site bounded by Barrack Road, Ferry Road and Garrison Road.

In 1834, the Governors of the asylum, carrying out the wishes of Mrs Carnegie (who had strongly advocated the appointment of a medical specialist in insanity) appointed the phrenologist William A. F. Browne as medical superintendent. Browne was to prove an inspired choice and an energetic and resourceful leader. He regarded public education as part of his duties, and gave a series of lectures which became enormously popular and influential. In 1837, five lectures were published together under the title What Asylums Were, Are and Ought To Be; this book came to the attention of the Dumfries philanthropist Elizabeth Crichton. She travelled to Montrose, interviewed Browne and offered him the equivalent post at the Crichton Royal in Dumfries. Browne was succeeded at Montrose by Richard Poole, an early psychiatric historian.

== Layout and design ==
In 1858, a new improved asylum designed by William Lambie Moffatt was completed to the north of Montrose in the village of Hillside on lands of the farm of Sunnyside and the old site was vacated. This site was further developed with the construction of a new facility for private patients called Carnegie House in 1899. Despite this addition, overcrowding was a problem, as the asylum's patient numbers had grown to 670 by 1900. This situation required additional building work to be undertaken.

Consequently, two new buildings - Howden Villa (1901) and Northesk Villa (1904) - were added to the facility. Additional staff were required to care for the additional patients and the Westmount Cottages were built in 1905 to house them. In 1911 the lease of Sunnyside Farm finally expired and over 52 acres were purchased for the sum of £4,500. A further development was the addition of Angus House, which was built to accommodate elderly patients suffering from dementia in 1939.

In 1948, the National Health Service 1946 (Scotland) Act brought the hospital under control of the Eastern Regional Hospital Board. Its name was changed from the Royal Asylum of Montrose to the Royal Mental Hospital of Montrose.

== Sunnyside Royal Hospital ==
In 1962 it became Sunnyside Royal Hospital and came under the jurisdiction of new management. During the 1950s and 1960s, the introduction of new drugs lessened the need for prolonged admission of patients. In addition, the Mental Health (Scotland) Act of 1960 also significantly altered legislation in respect of mental illness and reduced the grounds on which someone could be detained in a mental hospital.

After the introduction of Care in the Community in the early 1980s, the hospital went into a period of decline and, once patients had been transferred to the Susan Carnegie Centre at Stracathro Hospital, Sunnyside Royal Hospital closed in December 2011.

The archives of the hospital are held by Archive Services, University of Dundee as part of the NHS Tayside archive.
