= Charles Maclaren =

Scottish journalist and geologist (1782–1866)

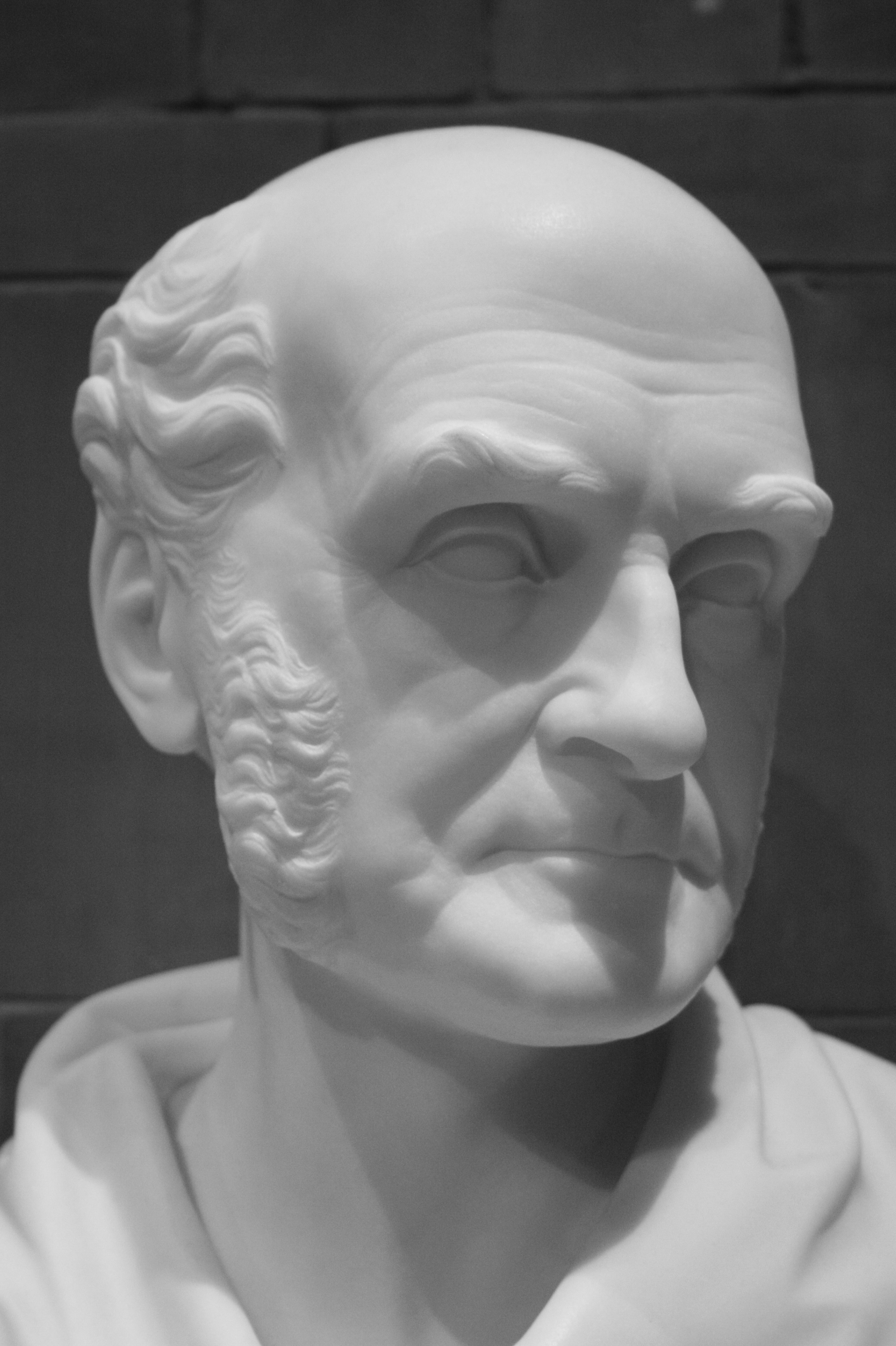
Charles MacLaren by John Hutchison 1861

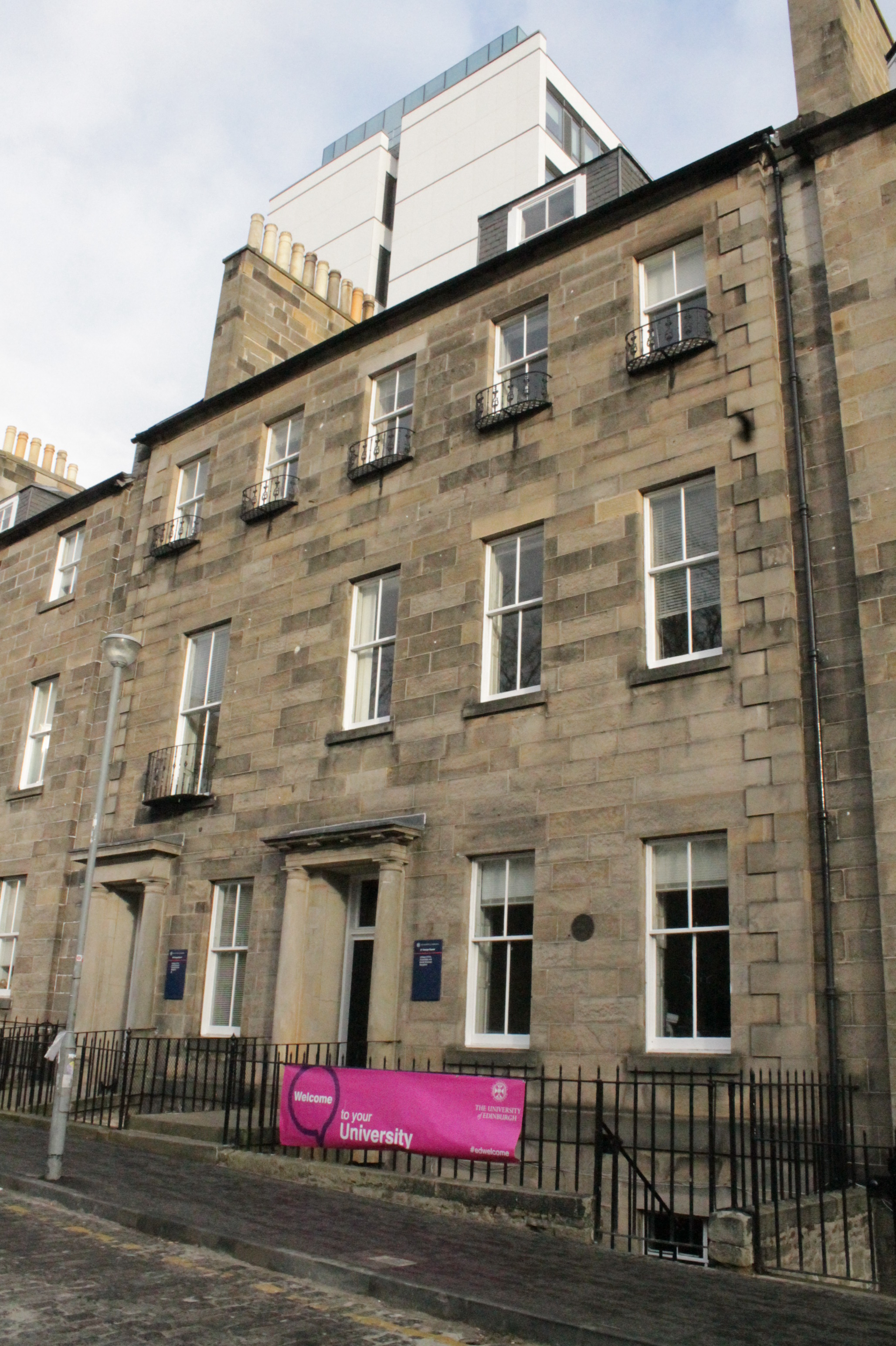
57.58 George Square in Edinburgh

Charles Maclaren, FRSE FGS (7 October 1782 – 10 September 1866), was a Scottish journalist and geologist. He co-founded The Scotsman newspaper, was its editor for 27 years, edited the 6th Edition of the Encyclopædia Britannica, and was the first to suggest that Hisarlik was the site of Troy.

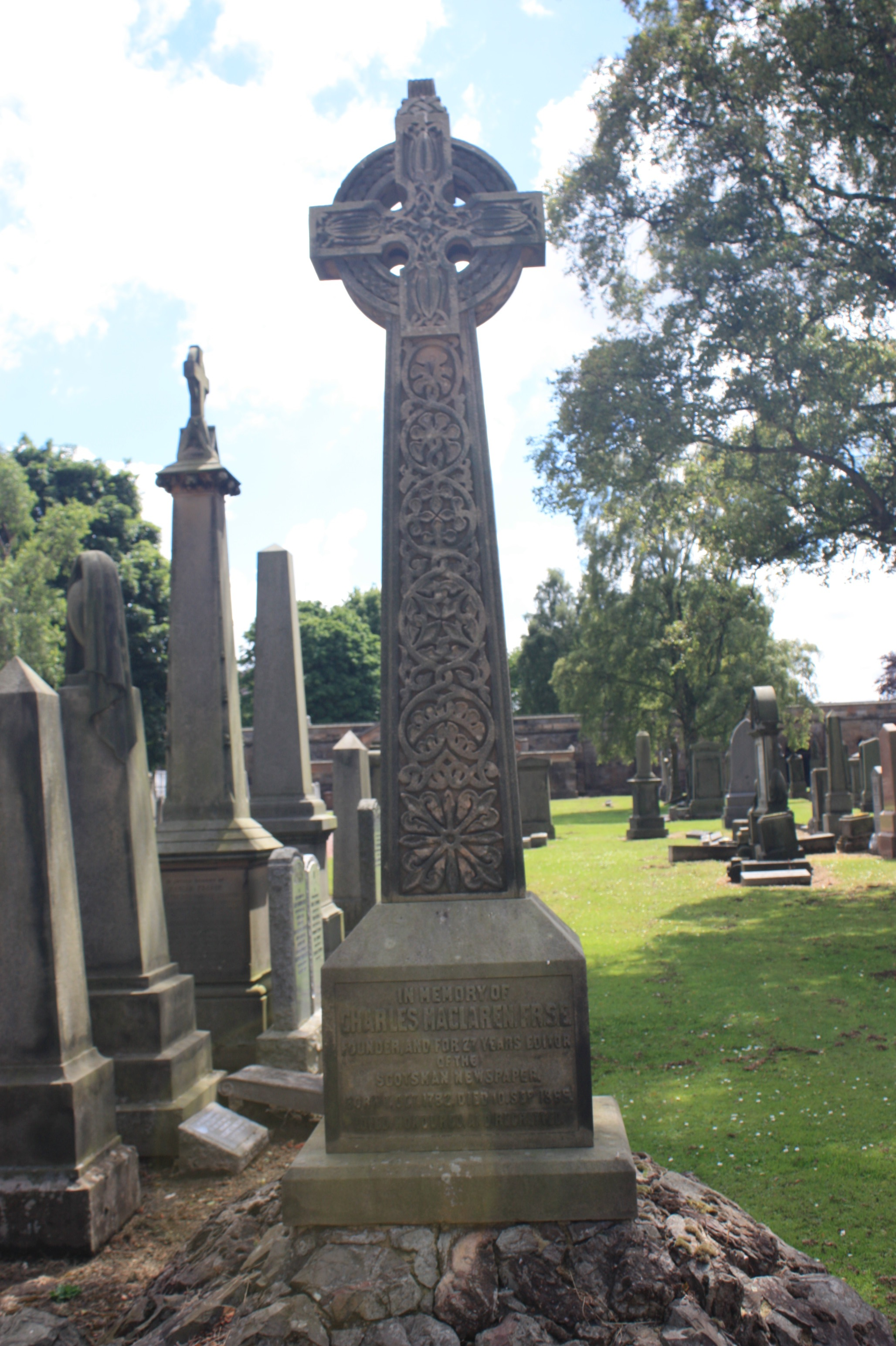
grave of Charles MacLaren, Grange Cemetery

== Life ==
He was born in Ormiston, East Lothian (east of Edinburgh), on 7 October 1782, the son of John McLaren, a farmer, and his wife, Christian Muckle. Charles received his education at Fala and Colinton, but he was also partly self-taught.

Around 1797, he moved to Edinburgh, where he served as a clerk and bookkeeper for several firms, he joined the Philomathic Debating Society, where he made the acquaintance of brothers John and William Ritchie.

Financed by John Ritchie, he established the Scotsman, 26 January 1817, with William Ritchie and John M'Diarmid, and was joint editor of the first few numbers. When he obtained a position as a clerk in the custom house, he yielded the editorial chair to John Ramsay M'Culloch. In 1820, Maclaren resumed the editorship and held it till 1846, when he resigned it to Alexander Russel. The paper rapidly became the leading political journal of Scotland; its tone was throughout decidedly Whiggish, and in church matters it advocated much freedom of opinion.

In 1822 Maclaren was the first person to successfully identify the correct position of the lost city of Troy, in his Dissertation on the Topography of the Plain of Troy.

In the 1830s Charles Maclaren of the Scotsman newspaper is listed as living at 58 George Square on the south side of the city. The property is a double level flat over 57 George Square.

He was elected a Fellow of the Royal Society of Edinburgh in 1837. His proposer was Sir Thomas Dick Lauder. In 1846 he was elected a Fellow of the Geological Society of London (FGS), and he was President of the Edinburgh Geological Society from 1864 to his death.

He retired in 1860 and died at home at Moreland Cottage on Grange Loan, Edinburgh, 10 September 1866.

He was interred very close to his home at the Grange Cemetery. His monument is a large Celtic cross facing the north path.

== Publications ==
- Dissertation on the Topography of the Plain of Troy
- The Geology of Fife and the Lothians

In 1820, Archibald Constable employed Maclaren to edit the sixth edition of the Encyclopædia Britannica, (1823) and to revise the historical and geographical articles. McLaren contributed the articles 'America,' 'Europe,' 'Greece,' 'Physical Geography,' and 'Troy'.

His Selected Works (1869) were edited by Robert Cox and James Nicol.

== Family ==
In 1842, late in life, he married Jane Veitch Somner (d.1871), a farmer's daughter, who was the widow of the jurist David Hume. They had no children.
