= William Ritchie (editor) =

Scottish lawyer, journalist and newspaper owner (1781–1831)

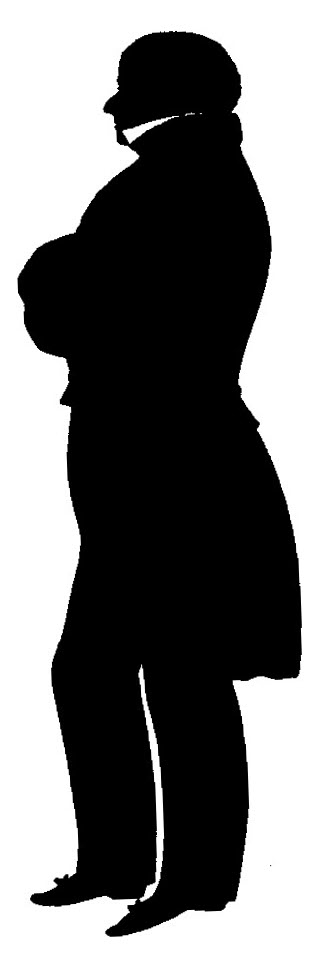
- Silhouette of Ritchie
- Born: 1781; Lundin Mill, Fife
- Died: 4 February 1831 (aged 49–50); Edinburgh, Midlothian, Scotland
- Occupations: Solicitor, journalist, newspaper editor, newspaper proprietor, social reformer

William Ritchie (1781 – 4 February 1831) was a Scottish lawyer, journalist and newspaper owner.

Ritchie was born at Lundin Mill, Fife, where his father had a flax dressing business.

At the age of 19 he moved to Edinburgh, and after some years employment in the offices of two firms of Writers to the Signet (solicitors), he became a member of the Society of Solicitors in the Supreme Courts of Scotland in 1808. His practice subsequently prospered, with Ritchie developing a reputation for tenacious pursuit of his clients' interests. He also was active in several debating societies.

After contributing to various publications, including the Scots Magazine, for a number of years, in 1816 he joined with Charles Maclaren, his elder brother John Ritchie and John Ramsay McCulloch in founding The Scotsman newspaper, the first number of which appeared the following year, Ritchie having suggested the title.

Ritchie was joint editor of the paper with Charles Maclaren, concentrating on the literary content, with Maclaren attending to the political. During the fourteen years of his editorship, Ritchie himself contributed over one thousand articles to the newspaper, ranging across the law, biography, the theatre, literature and the natural world. Although not initially profitable, the newspaper rapidly established itself as a reforming journal. In his The Newspaper Press James Grant wrote

the Scotsman rendered greater service to the cause of reform than all its Scottish liberal contemporaries taken together.

In 1824 Ritchie published Essays on Constitutional Law and Forms of Process and in 1827 was appointed a commissioner under the Improvements Act. He campaigned for reform of policing and prison conditions, especially for poor debtors.

On 4 February 1831, Ritchie died at his home in George Square, Edinburgh. After his death Charles Maclaren wrote

He possessed in the highest moral and physical courage, and while immersed in the common cares and business of life, he retained an elevation of sentiment worthy of a hero of romance, united with the purity, delicacy, and gentleness, which is rarely found except in the other sex.

Ritchie was buried in Greyfriars Kirkyard, Edinburgh, and commemorated on the Ritchie Findlay family memorial in Dean Cemetery, Edinburgh.

Ritchie was survived by his wife Alison Sandeman.
