= John Russel (cricketer) =

Scottish cricketer

Personal information
- Full name: John Somerville Russel
- Born: 19 March 1849; Edinburgh, Midlothian, Scotland
- Died: 12 September 1902 (aged 53); Banchory, Aberdeenshire, Scotland
- Batting: Right-handed
- Bowling: Unknown
- Relatives: Patrick Russel (brother)

Domestic team information
- Years: Team
- 1875–1891: Marylebone Cricket Club

Career statistics
Competition	First-class
Matches	79
Runs scored	1,641
Batting average	12.92
100s/50s	–/7
Top score	83
Balls bowled	8
Wickets	0
Bowling average	–
5 wickets in innings	–
10 wickets in match	–
Best bowling	–
Catches/stumpings	32/–
- Source: Cricinfo, 20 August 2019

John Somerville Russel (19 March 1849 – 12 September 1902) was a Scottish first-class cricketer.

The son of Alexander Russel of The Scotsman, he was born in March 1849 at Edinburgh in, where he was educated at the Royal High School. Russel had a long association with Lord's in London, first playing there in 1870 while assisting the north of Ireland, though it is unclear what qualified him to play for an Irish based team. He made his debut in first-class cricket for the Marylebone Cricket Club (MCC) against Yorkshire at Scarborough in 1875. Russel's playing association with the MCC lasted until 1891, with him appearing in 74 first-class matches for the club. Described by Wisden as an "excellent batsman when at his best" though his "style was not attractive", Russel scored 1,547 runs for the MCC at an average of 13.11 and a high score of 83, one of six half centuries he made. In seasons where he played five for more matches, Russel had his best season in 1882 when he scored 335 runs at an average of 25.76 from nine matches. This season included a match winning performance against Somerset, where he made scores of 56 and 83 opening the batting to help the MCC to a one wicket victory.

In addition to playing first-class cricket for the MCC, he also appeared in one first-class match for the Gentlemen of England in 1879, and two first-class matches each for the Over 30s in the Over 30s v Under 30s fixtures of 1880 and 1882 and for the South in the North v South fixtures of 1878 and 1887. Outside of cricket, he worked as a merchant based in Newcastle upon Tyne, where he played minor matches for Northumberland. When Henry Perkins retired from the position of MCC secretary, Russel initially stood in the election to be his replacement, though he eventually withdrew leaving Francis Lacey unopposed. He died suddenly at Banchory near Aberdeen in September 1902. His brother, Patrick, also played first-class cricket.
