= William Peck (astronomer) =

Scottish astronomer and scientific instrument maker

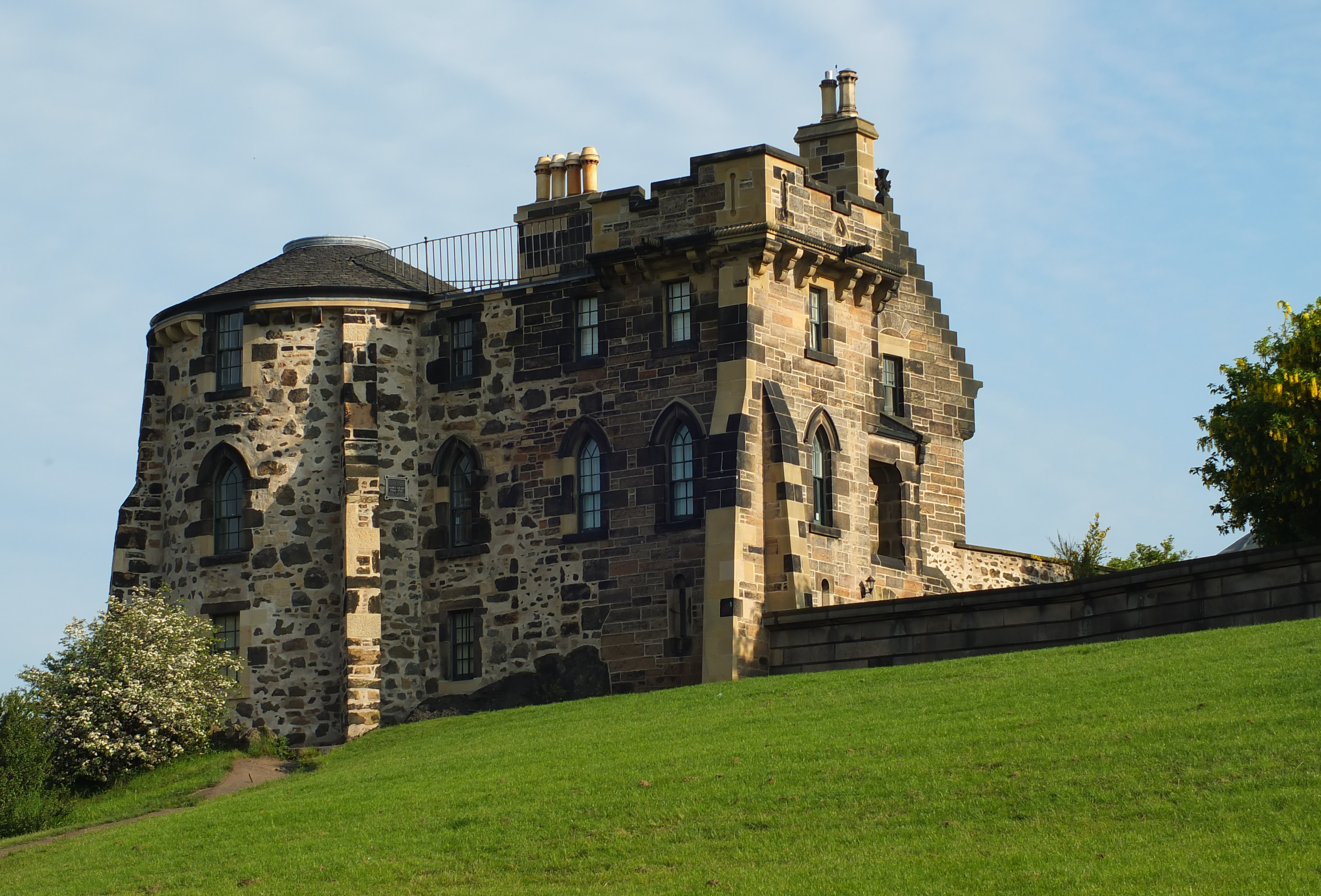
Observatory House, Edinburgh

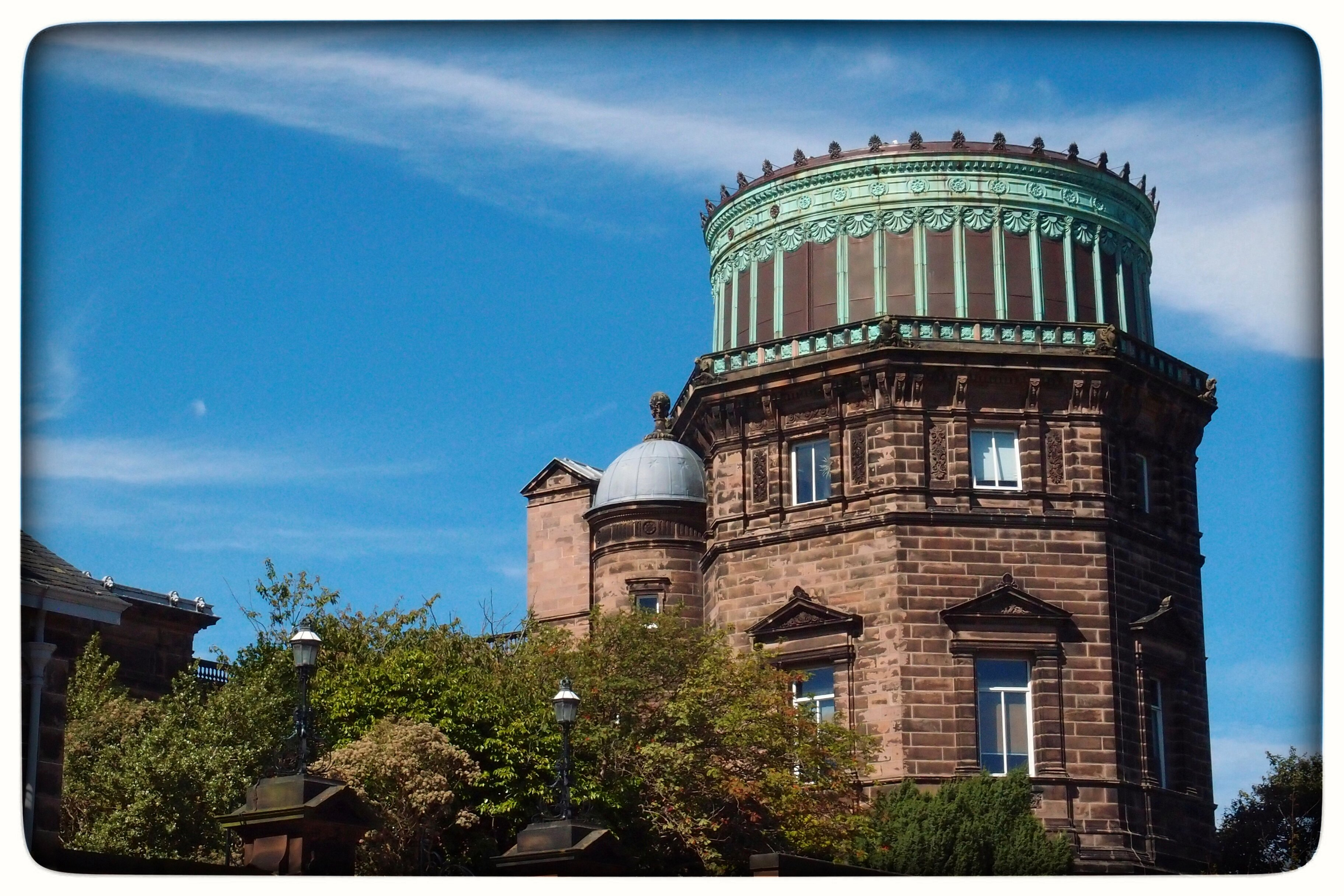
Royal Observatory, Blackford Hill

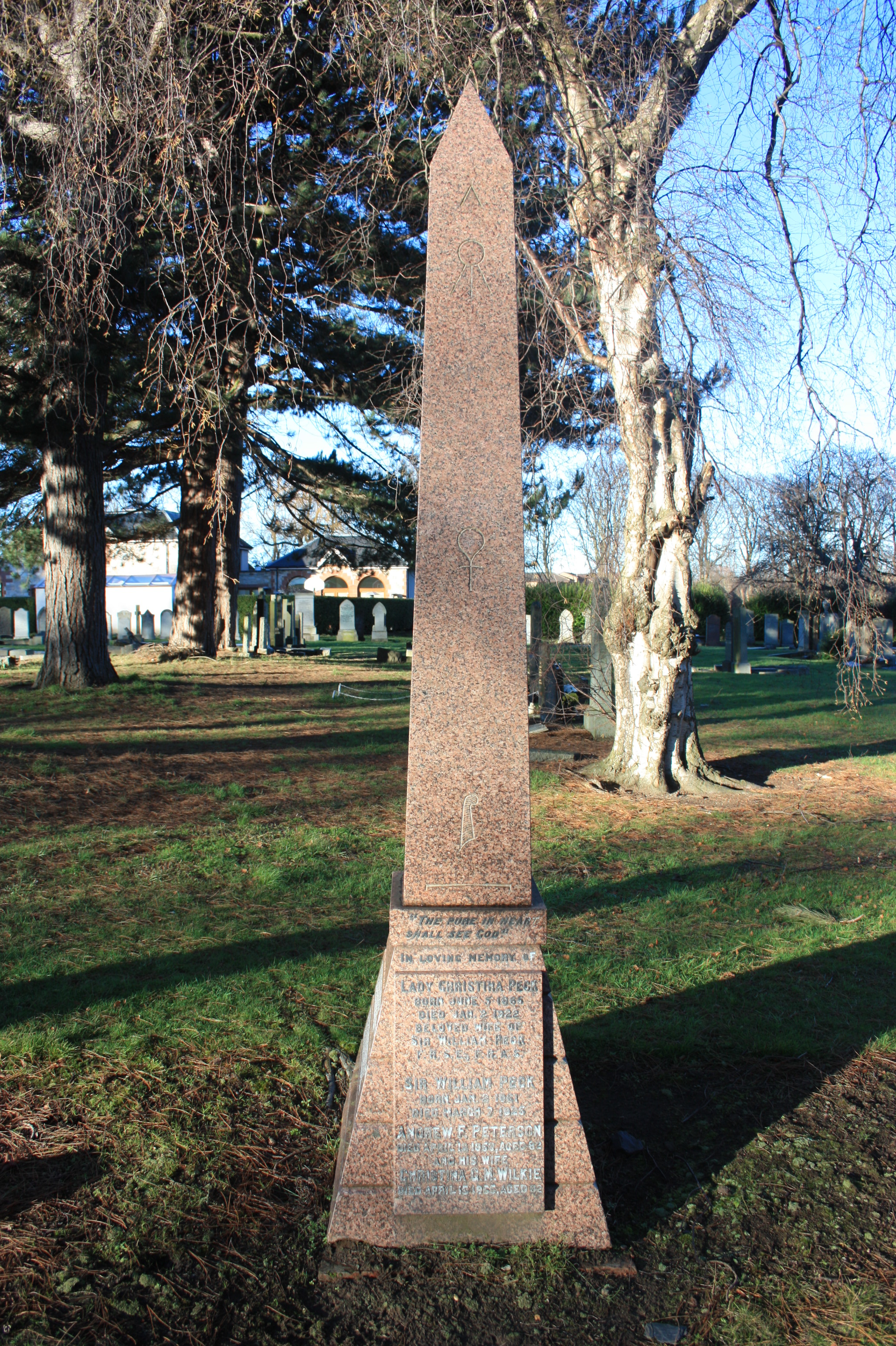
The grave of Sir William Peck, Warriston Cemetery, Edinburgh

Sir William Peck FRSE FRAS (3 January 1862, Castle Douglas, Kirkcudbrightshire – 7 March 1925, Edinburgh) was a Scottish astronomer and scientific instrument maker.

== Life ==
He was born in Castle Douglas in Kirkcudbrightshire on 3 January 1862, the son of William Peck. His family moved to Edinburgh in his youth and here he worked in a glue factory in the Gorgie district for Robert Cox. Cox asked him to run a private observatory. From 1883, despite a lack of formal university training, he began lecturing in Astronomy.

He was the director of the Edinburgh City Observatory from 1889 until his death. In the same year he was elected a Fellow of the Royal Society of Edinburgh. His proposers were Robert Cox, Sir Arthur Mitchell, Alexander Buchan and the 8th Duke of Argyll. From 1893 to 1896 he was involved in the relocation of the Edinburgh Observatory from Calton Hill to Blackford Hill.

In 1898 he founded the Madelvic Motor Carriage Company, one of the world's first factories making electric cars, at the Madelvic Works at Granton, Edinburgh.

He continued to live at Observatory House on Calton Hill in Edinburgh even after the observatory moved to Blackford Hill.

He also belonged to the Hermetic Order of the Golden Dawn, a secret occult society founded in the late 1800s. Among the members of the Golden Dawn, there was Irish poet W B Yeats, actress Florence Farr, Oscar Wilde's wife Cobstance Mary, Bram Stocker and obviously Aleister Crowley.

He was knighted by King George V in 1917.

He died at his home in Inverleith Row in Edinburgh on 7 March 1925. He is buried in Warriston Cemetery in the upper section, on the north side of the main east-west path.

== Family ==
In 1889 he married Christina Thomson (1865-1922).

== Works ==
- The handy star map (1880)
- The constellations and how to find them (1887)
- Popular Handbook and Atlas of Astronomy (1890)
- The observer's atlas of the heavens (1898)
- The Southern Hemisphere constellations and how to find them (1911)
- An Introduction to the Celestial Sphere. Volume I The Topography and Mythology of the Star Groups (1919)
