= Patrick Russel (cricketer) =

Scottish cricketer and tea merchant

Personal information
- Full name: Patrick Russel
- Born: 16 October 1857; Edinburgh, Midlothian, Scotland
- Died: 12 October 1917 (aged 59); City of London, England
- Batting: Unknown
- Relatives: John Russel (brother)

Domestic team information
- Years: Team
- 1894: Marylebone Cricket Club

Career statistics
Competition	First-class
Matches	1
Runs scored	25
Batting average	25.00
100s/50s	–/–
Top score	25*
Catches/stumpings	–/–
- Source: Cricinfo, 5 November 2021

Patrick Russel (16 October 1857 – 12 October 1917) was a Scottish first-class cricketer and tea merchant.

The son of Alexander Russel of The Scotsman, he was born at Edinburgh in October 1857. He was educated at both the Edinburgh Academy and Fettes College. After completing his education, Russel worked largely in British India as a tea planter and merchant. He was a keen cricketer who played club cricket for the West of Scotland Cricket Club and Grange Cricket Club, in addition to playing minor matches for Scotland in 1878. Russel appeared once in first-class cricket for the Marylebone Cricket Club (MCC), captaining the club against Derbyshire at Lord's in 1894. Batting twice in the match, he was dismissed in the MCC first innings without scoring by George Davidson, while in their second innings following-on, he was unbeaten on 25, with Derbyshire going onto win the match by 7 wickets. He died on 12 October 1917 from heart failure, immediately following a meeting of the Imperial Tea Company of which he was a director. His brother, John, also played first-class cricket.
