= Madelvic Motor Carriage Company =

Early electric car manufacturer

- Interactive map of Madelvic Motor Carriage Company

General information
- Location: 37 Granton Park Avenue, Granton, Edinburgh, Scotland
- Coordinates: 55.980446°N 3.232809°W
- Grid reference: NT2317277071
- Opened: 1899
- Owner: Scottish Government

Listed Building – Category B
- Official name: 37 Granton Park Avenue, Former Madelvic Works, Office, Production Block, and Generating Block only
- Designated: 16 September 1998
- Reference no.: LB45654

The Madelvic Motor Carriage Company of Granton, Scotland was an early car manufacturing company.

== History ==
The company was founded by William Peck, Edinburgh's City Astronomer, to develop the emerging technology of electricity. Madelvic produced an 'electric brougham' at their factory in Granton, north Edinburgh, between 1898 and 1900. The vehicle was driven by a three-wheeled front axle unit, comprising motor, batteries and a small central wheel, set behind the axle, which propelled the car. This unit was mounted to the front of a chassis, creating a five-wheeled vehicle, but could also be attached to a horse-drawn carriage. Peck offered public transport using the car, between Granton and Leith as publicity. A more conventional front wheel drive electric vehicle was also briefly produced. However, electric cars were not to be the future, and Madelvic went bankrupt, being taken over by the Kingsburgh Motor Company in 1900.

The original factory building still stands in Granton, and is currently being renovated for residential and office use. It is the oldest surviving car factory in Britain. After Madelvic ceased production, cars were built here by Kingsburgh, and then by the Stirlings Motor Carriages Ltd, who also built buses on the site, exporting some to Australia. In 1925 the buildings were bought by United Wire, and used by them until 2001.

In 2001, the buildings were purchased by the development company Waterfront Edinburgh Limited, a joint venture between City of Edinburgh Council and Scottish Enterprise. Buredi, a joint venture between The Burrell Company and the City of Edinburgh Council, had hoped to redevelop the factory to create a range of residential apartments, townhouses and commercial office space. The renovation was designed by Malcolm Fraser Architects. The building is on the Buildings at Risk Register for Scotland. In July 2024, the Lar Housing Trust submitted plans for the conversion of the production block into 28 townhouses.

== Gallery ==
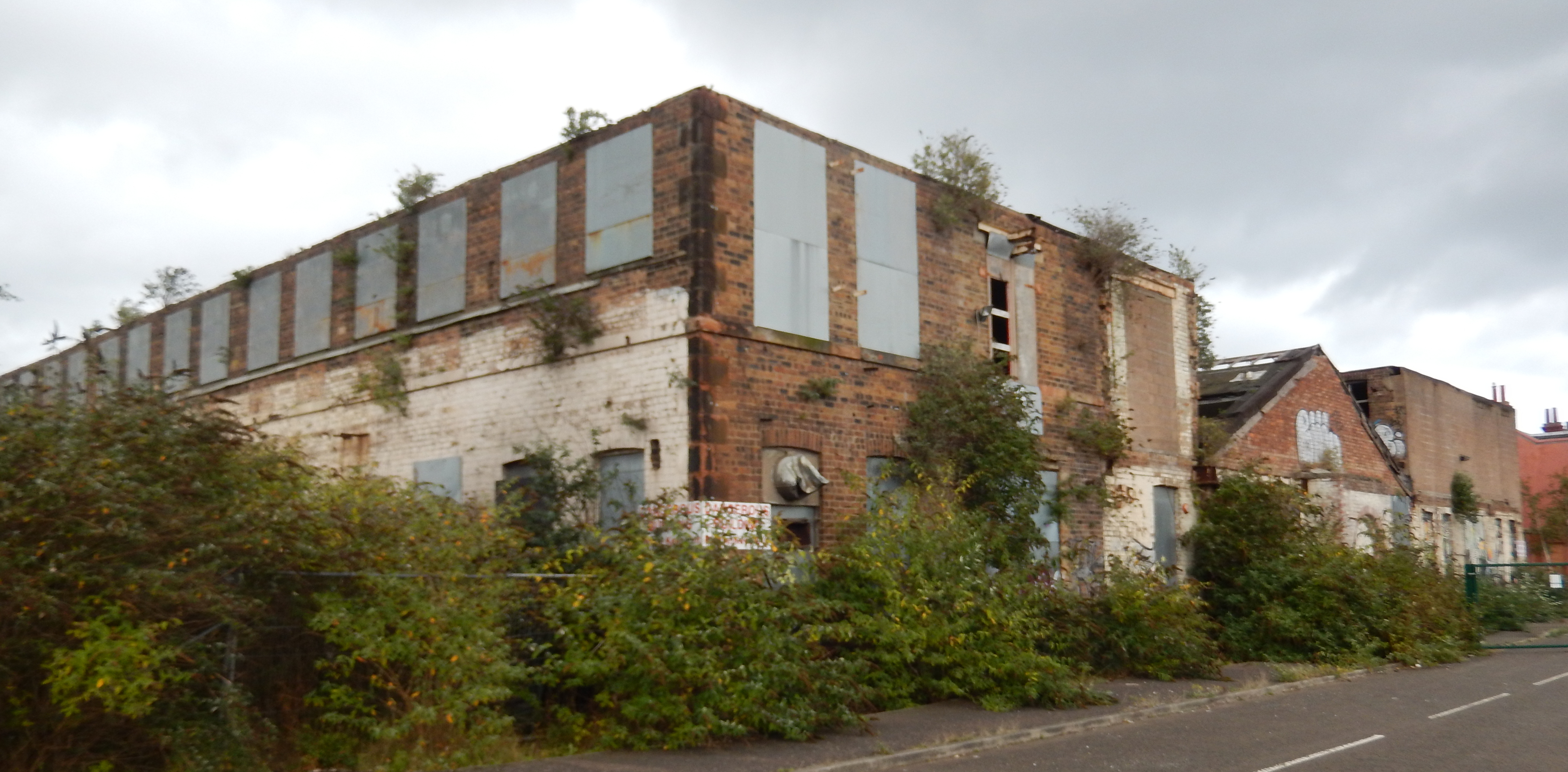
The former production block of the motor works.

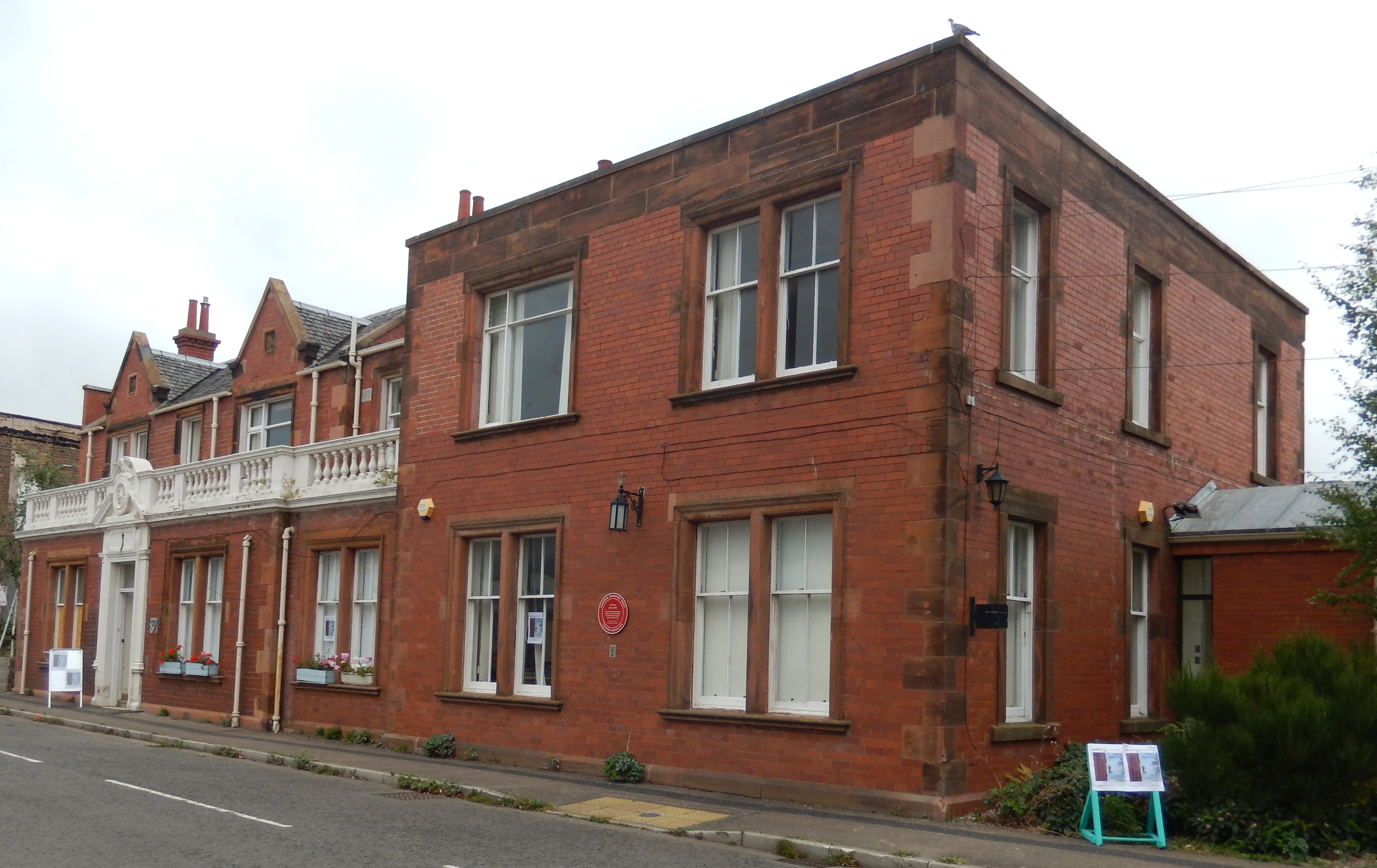
Madelvic House, the former administration block of the motor works. Currently used as a community hub.

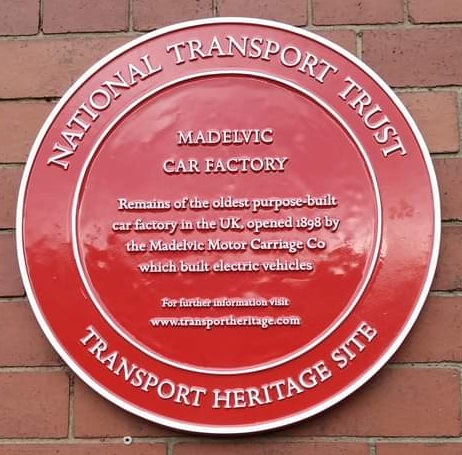
A commemorative plaque marking the motor works.

== See also ==
- List of car manufacturers of the United Kingdom
