= Alexander Russel =

British newspaper editor

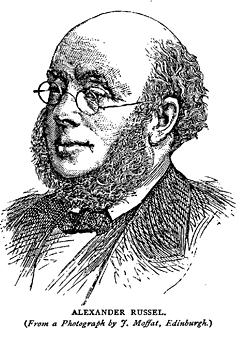
Alexander Russel

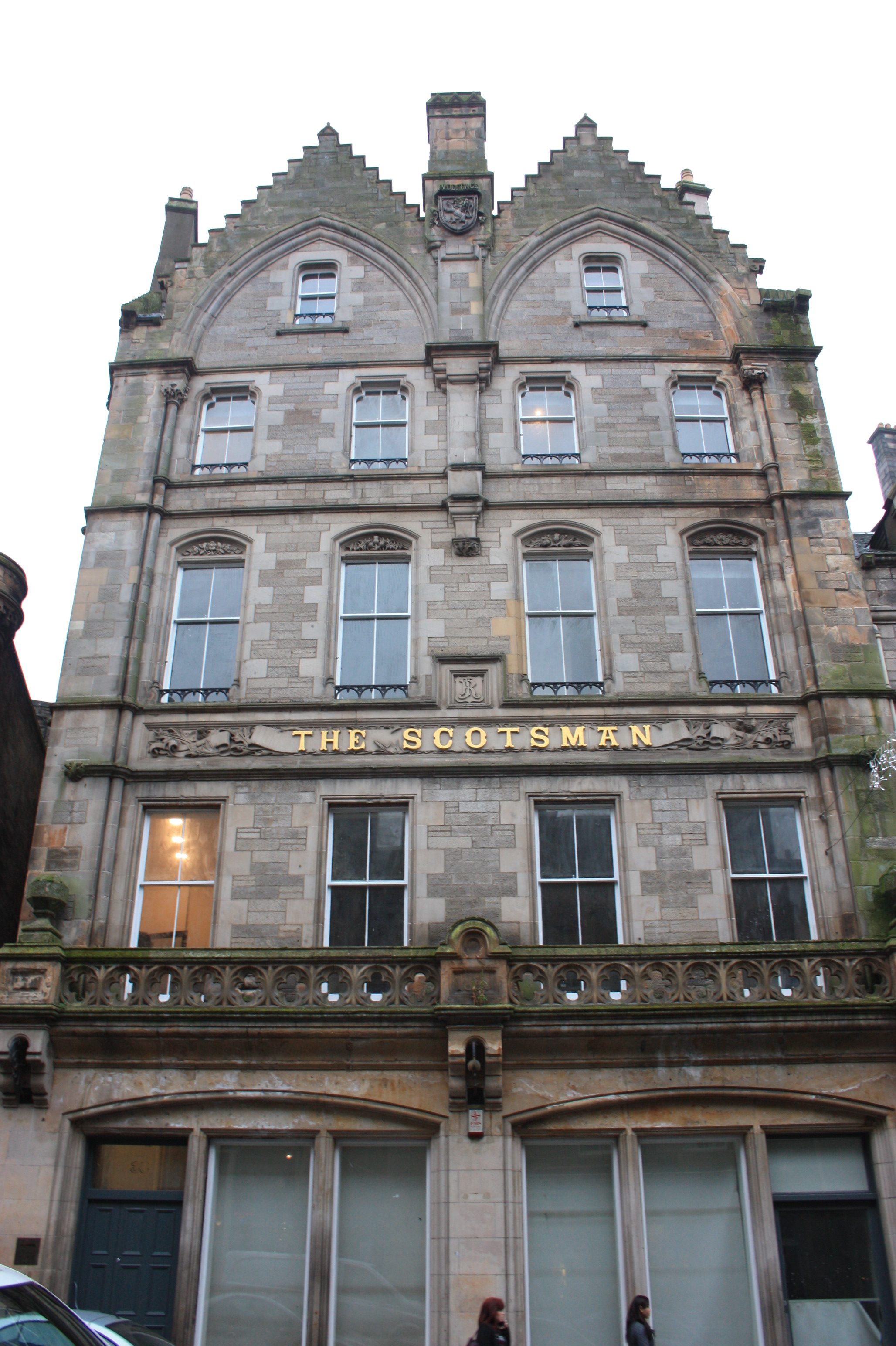
Scotsman Office built 1860 at the time of Russel

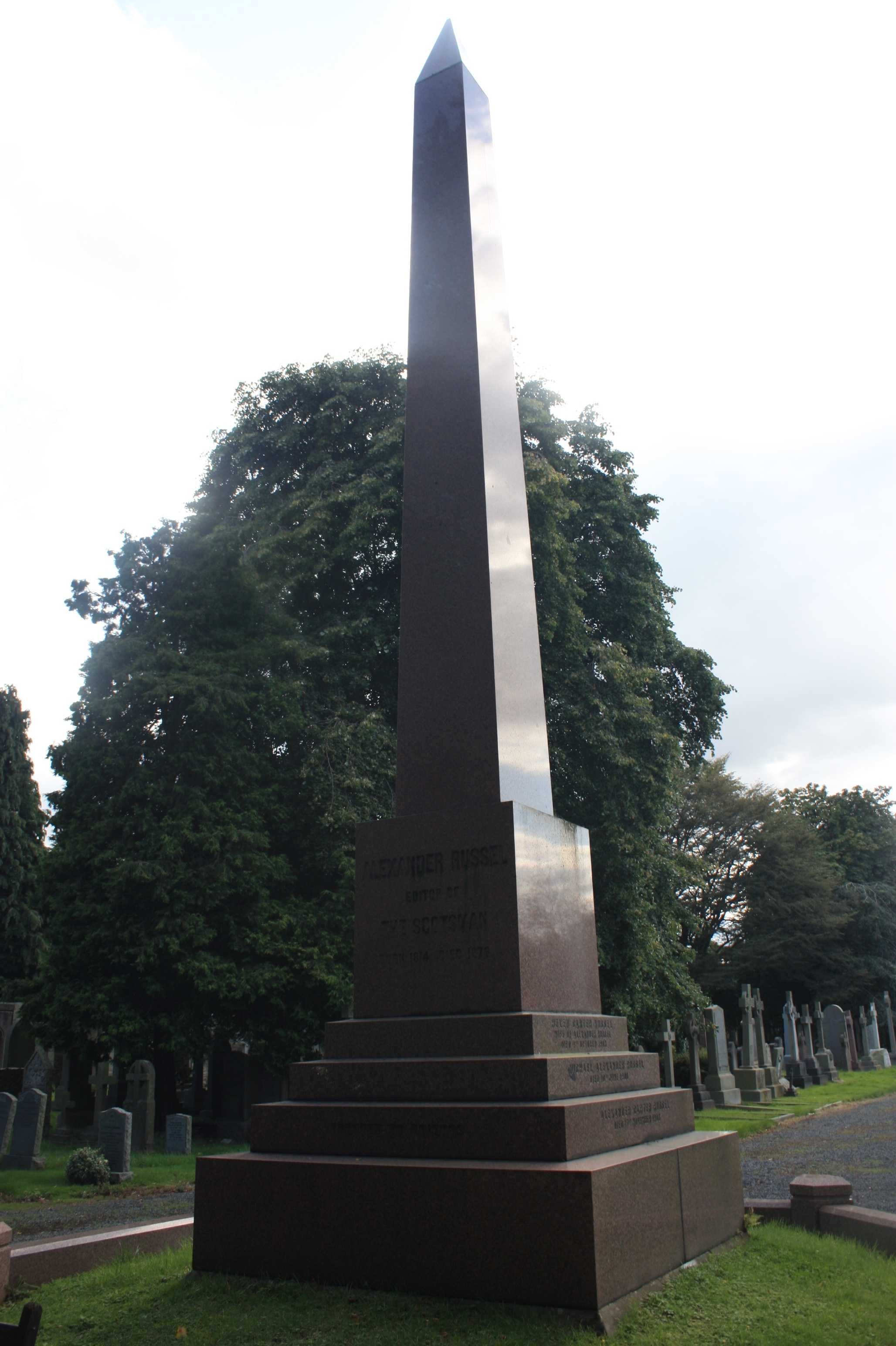
The huge monument to Alexander Russel in Dean Cemetery

Alexander Russel (or sometimes Russell) FRSE (1814–1876) was a Scottish newspaper editor, who spent nearly 30 years as the editor of The Scotsman.

== Early life ==
Russel was born on 10 December 1814 in Edinburgh; his father, a solicitor and a liberal in politics, died when he was still very young, whilst his mother, a daughter of John Somerville, clerk in the jury court, survived until Alexander was 50. After attending the classical school kept by the Rev. Ross Kennedy in St. James Square, Edinburgh, he was apprenticed in 1828 to a printer. John Johnstone, later editor of the Inverness Courier, was one of his fellow-apprentices, and his wife Christian Isobel Johnstone, who had a major role in editing Tait's Magazine, gave Russel the opportunity of contributing to that magazine.

In 1839 Russel was appointed editor of the Berwick Advertiser. While at Berwick-on-Tweed he made the acquaintance of David Robertson of Ladykirk, and with him took part in Northumbrian political contests. In 1842 he left Berwick for Cupar in Fife, where he edited the Fife Herald. There he met some influential liberals, including Admiral Wemyss, Edward Ellice the elder and his son.

== The Scotsman ==
After two years in Cupar, Russell became editor of a new journal in Kilmarnock. John Ritchie, one of the founders of the biweekly Edinburgh paper The Scotsman, was impressed with his articles, and invited him to become assistant to Charles Maclaren, the editor of The Scotsman which Russel joined in March 1845. In 1848 he became its editor.

Russel's journalism became identified with The Scotsman. His editorial line supported the Anti-Corn-law League, and drew attention to the destitution of the Highlands. The Scotsman's support contributed to Thomas Babington Macaulay's re-election for Edinburgh in 1852; but in the same year Duncan McLaren successfully sued the paper for libel. From June 1855 The Scotsman became a daily paper. The Reform Club elected Russel an honorary member in 1875, "for distinguished public services".

In 1860 he oversaw the relocation of the Scotsman offices from the Royal Mile to Cockbirn Street in a building designed by Peddie & Kinnear.

== Later life ==
In 1865 he was living at 2 Ramsay Gardens at the top of the Royal Mile.

Russel attended and described the opening of the Suez Canal in 1869. Serious illness in 1872 compelled him to winter in the south of France.

In 1870 he was elected a Fellow of the Royal Society of Edinburgh, his proposer being Archibald Campbell Swinton.

He lived his final years at 9 Chester Street in Edinburgh's fashionable West End.

He died suddenly, of angina pectoris, on 18 July 1876. Russel was noted as a conversationalist as well as a writer, but not as a public speaker, and he declined in 1872 an invitation to become a candidate for the lord-rectorship of Aberdeen.

His monument (a huge red granite obelisk by Stewart McGlashan) forms the centrepiece of the north section of Dean Cemetery in Edinburgh. His wife, Jessie MacWilliam (1821-1870) lies with him, as does his son, Charles MacLaren Russel, who was drowned in the Ettrick Water on 23 September 1869, aged only nine.

== Works ==
Angling was Russel's favourite recreation, and his articles on it in The Scotsman, the Quarterly Review, and Blackwood's Magazine were collected in The Salmon (1864). An article by him on "Agricultural Complaints", which appeared in the Edinburgh Review for April 1850, was praised by Francis Jeffrey. His son was the cricketer John Russel.

== Family ==
Russel was twice married with children by both marriages. His first wife was Jessie McWilliam. His second wife was a widow, Mrs Helen Evans (née Carter), one of the Edinburgh Seven, with whom he had three children including feminist and writer Helen Archdale. Another daughter married Francis Dalzell Finlay the younger, proprietor of the Belfast newspaper the Northern Whig. A son, Patrick, was a first-class cricketer.

== Publications (as author) ==
Jumps in Jura (1856)

== Notes ==
Attribution

This article incorporates text from a publication now in the public domain: Lee, Sidney, ed. (1897). "Russel, Alexander". Dictionary of National Biography. Vol. 49. London: Smith, Elder & Co.
