= John Ritchie (newspaper owner) =

Scottish newspaper owner (1778–1870)

- John Ritchie c1860
- Born: 3 February 1778; Kirkcaldy, Fife, Scotland
- Died: 21 December 1870 (aged 92); Edinburgh, Midlothian, Scotland
- Occupations: Farm Worker, weaver, draper, newspaper proprietor

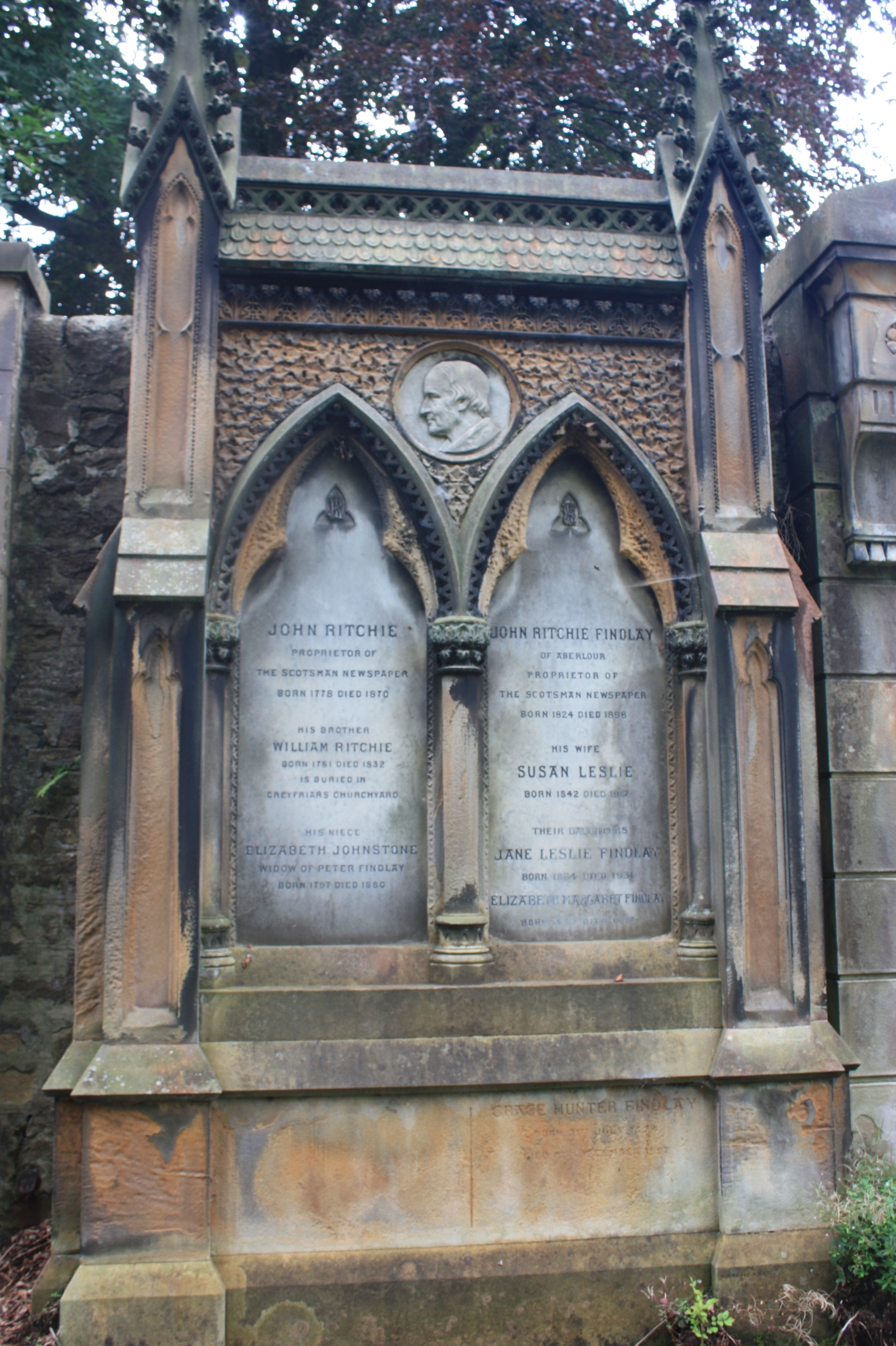
John Ritchie monument, Dean Cemetery

John Ritchie (3 February 1778 – 21 December 1870) was a Scottish newspaper owner. He was born at Kirkcaldy, Fife, and at an early age went in service to a small farmer near Largo. Later he returned to Kirkcaldy, working as a hand-loom weaver. In around 1800 he moved to Edinburgh (where his younger brother William was training in the law), and established himself as a draper.

In 1816 he helped to finance his brother's new venture, The Scotsman newspaper.

Following his brother's death in 1831, he became much more involved with the newspaper, giving up the drapery business. Within a few years he was the sole proprietor, having bought out the other shareholders. He turned the paper into a daily in 1855, selling at the price of 1d.

In 1842, Ritchie's great-nephew John Ritchie Findlay came to live with Ritchie, and entered the business.

In addition to his newspaper activities, Ritchie was a town councillor in Edinburgh, a magistrate, chairman of the Chamber of Commerce and one of the founders of the United Industrial School.

On Ritchie's death in 1881, John Ritchie Findlay succeeded him in the ownership of The Scotsman. They are buried in the same family plot at the south end of "Lords Row" on the western wall of Dean Cemetery in Edinburgh.

== Poetry ==
John Ritchie encouraged the appearance of poems by the young Isa Craig (1831-1903) in The Scotsman and when these were collected in her first volume, "Poems" (1856), he was the dedicatee.

From 1860 onwards, he began to publish poems of both a religious and patriotic tendency. Among the former were The Life of Jonah the Prophet (1860); The Church, Mammon, and the People (1861); a Sabbatarian plea, The Sabbath Bell, A Poem for the People (1861); and the biblical verse drama, The Captive Maid, Dramatised (1868).

Most of the patriotic poetry centred about Prince Albert. The first anniversary of his death was commemorated by the 16 pages of Royal soliloquies: the royal Highland home and other poems (1863), which also contained tributes to heroes of the Napoleonic Wars. The royal poems from this were later reprised in another 16-page booklet, Royal Episodes (1868), together with other poems on royal occasions. In between had come Dialogue between a popular Prince and an old Chancellor (1864). One of his longer works, its contains a versified posthumous conversation between Lord Palmerston and the late Prince Consort, surveying the state of England.
