= The Scotsman =

Scottish national daily newspaper

- The Scotsman cover (11 May 2011)
- Type: Daily newspaper
- Format: Compact
- Owner: National World
- Editor: Alan Young
- Founded: 1817
- Political alignment: None
- Headquarters: Edinburgh, Scotland
- Circulation: 6,698 (as of 2024)
- Sister newspapers: Edinburgh Evening News; Scotland on Sunday
- ISSN: 0307-5850
- OCLC number: 614655655
- Website: scotsman.com

The Scotsman is a Scottish compact newspaper and daily news website headquartered in Edinburgh. First established as a radical political paper in 1817, it began daily publication in 1855 and remained a broadsheet until August 2004. Its parent company, National World, also publishes the Edinburgh Evening News. It had an audited print circulation of 8,762 for July to December 2022. Its website, Scotsman.com, had an average of 138,000 unique visitors a day as of 2017. The title celebrated its bicentenary on 25 January 2017.

== History ==
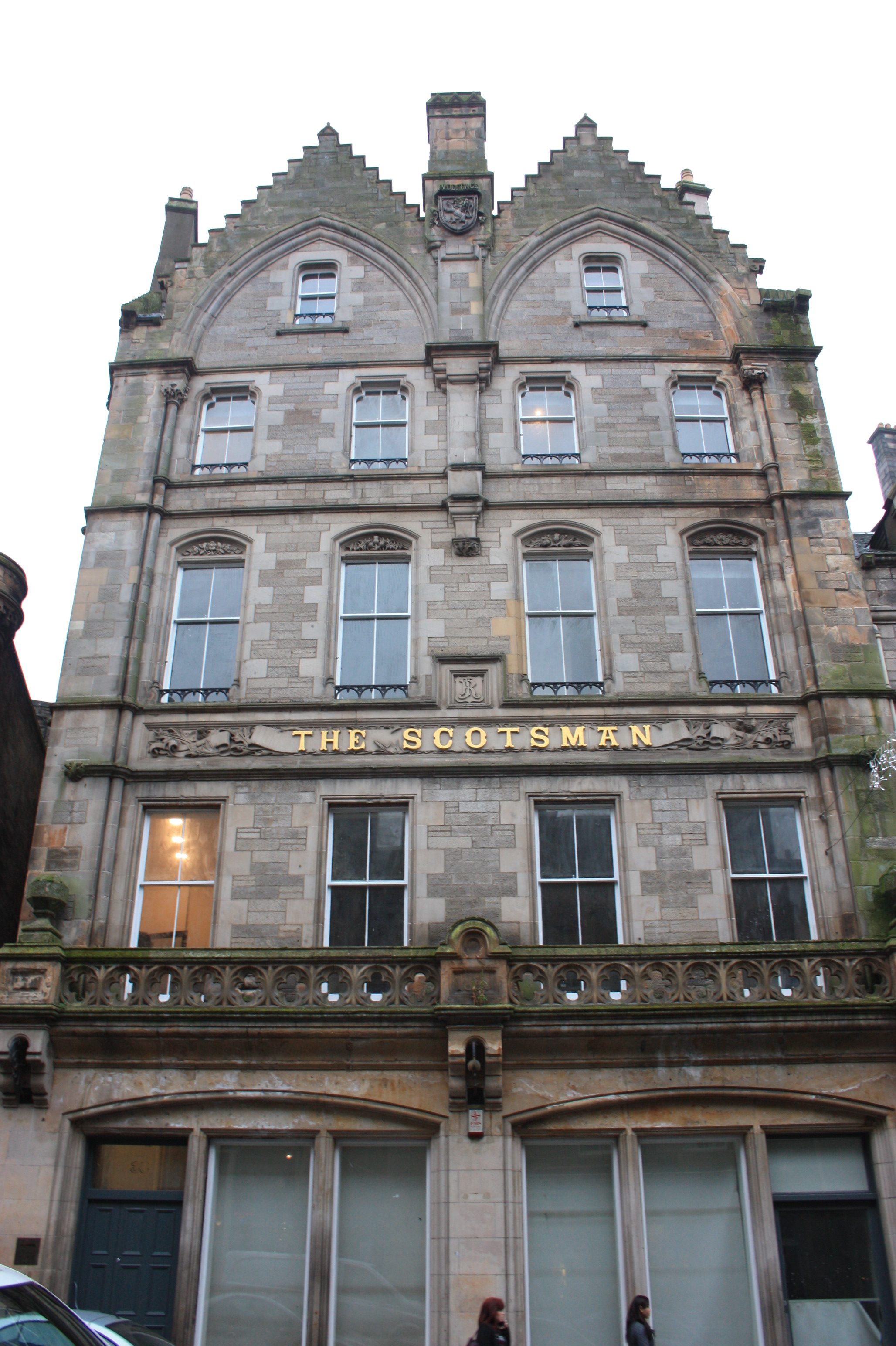
Scotsman office 1860 by Peddie and Kinnear

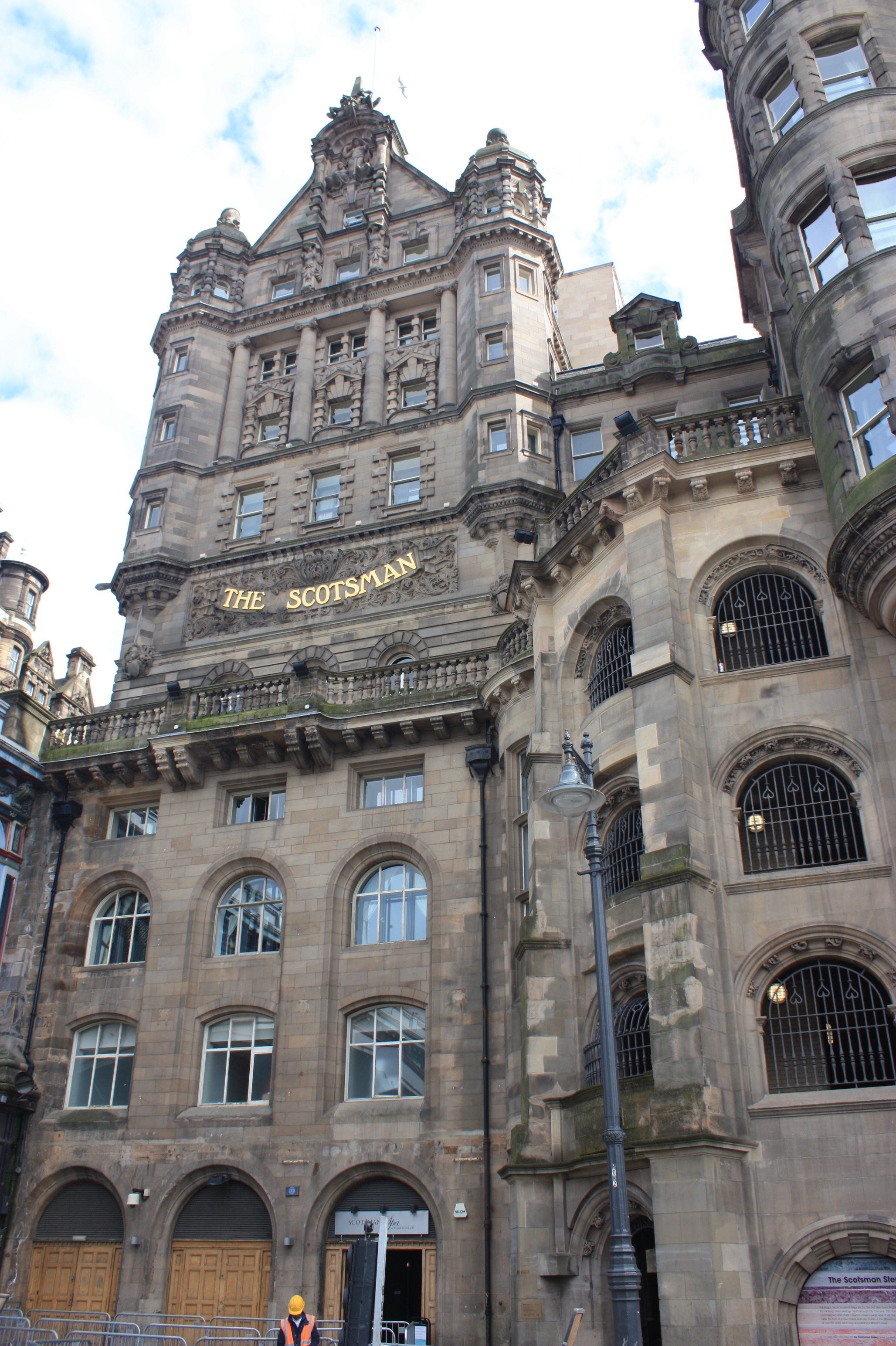
Scotsman buildings as seen from Market Street

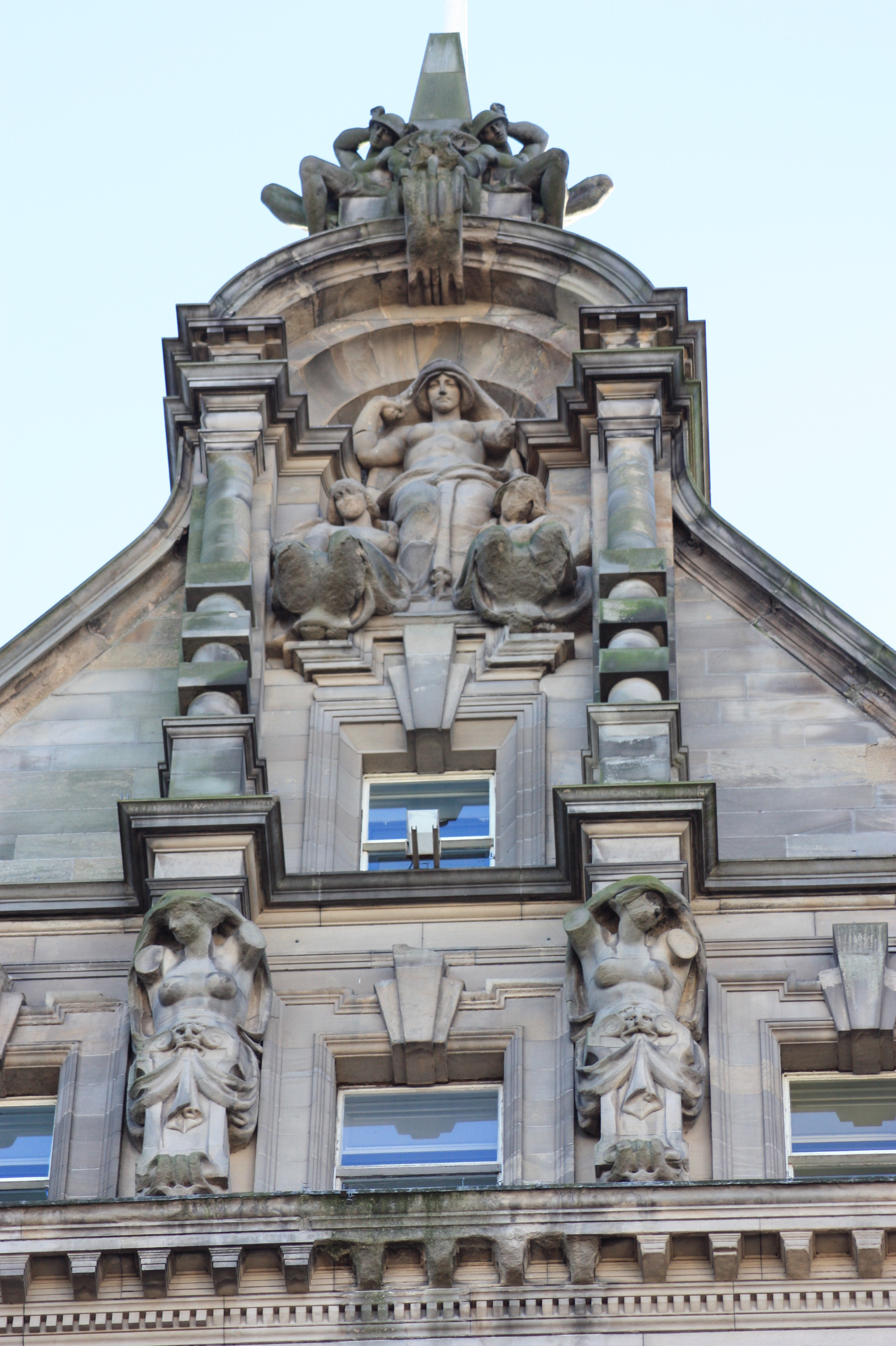
Apex of the Scotsman offices of 1899

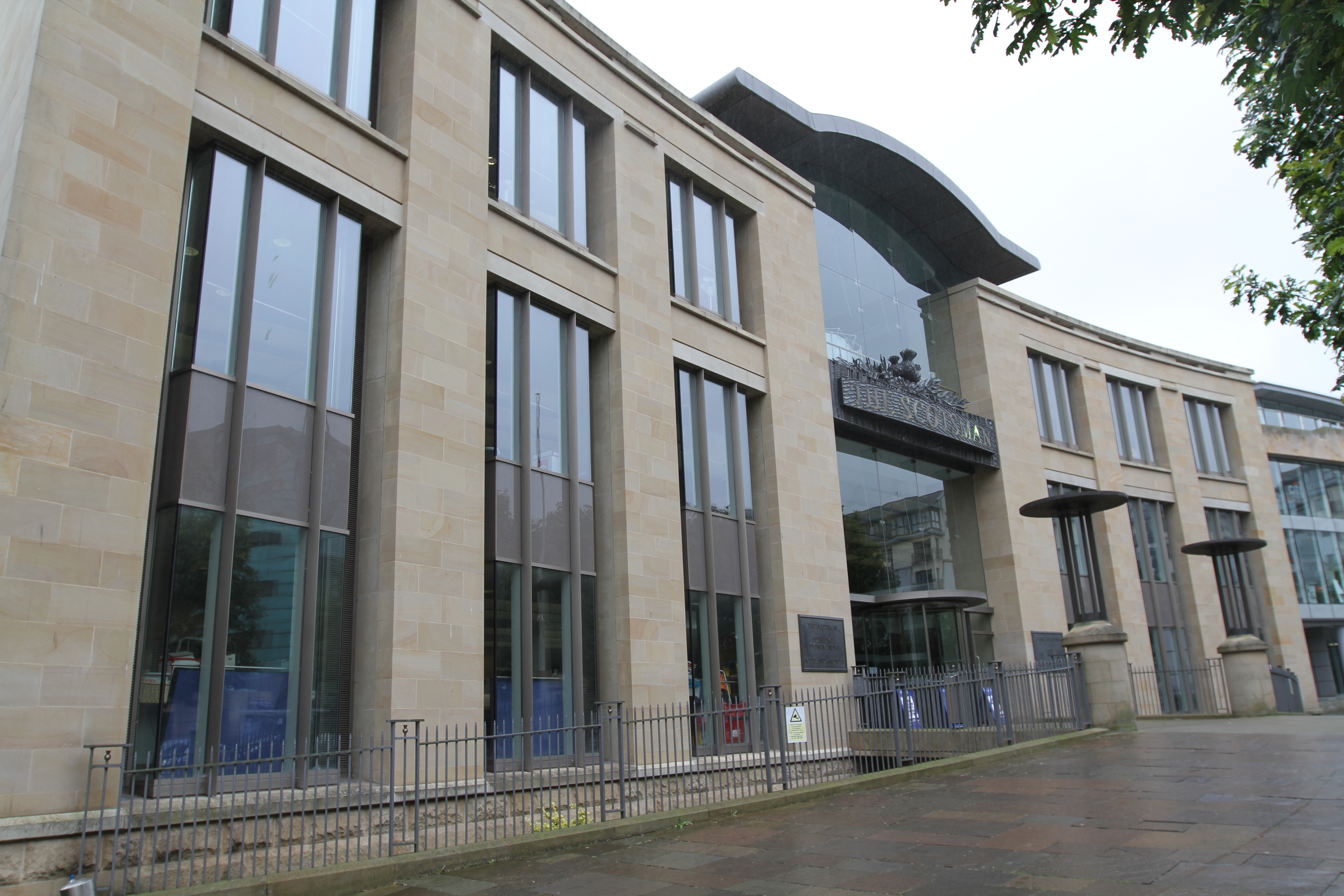
Barclay House, former home of The Scotsman's offices in Edinburgh

The Scotsman was conceived in 1816 and first launched on 25 January 1817 as a liberal weekly newspaper by lawyer William Ritchie and customs official Charles Maclaren in response to the "unblushing subservience" of competing newspapers to the Edinburgh establishment. These two plus John Ramsay McCulloch were co-founders of the venture. Circulation was 2,500 in 1837 and slowly rose to 3,500 in 1854.

The paper was pledged to "impartiality, firmness and independence". The price was originally 6d plus 4d tax. After the abolition of newspaper stamp tax in Scotland in 1855, The Scotsman was relaunched as a daily newspaper priced at 1d and a circulation of 6,000 copies.

The fledgling paper was originally based at 257 High Street on the Royal Mile in Edinburgh. Until 1860 the Scotsman shared a building with the Caledonian Mercury newspaper.

In 1860, The Scotsman obtained its own purpose built office on Cockburn Street in Edinburgh designed in the Scots baronial style by the architects Peddie & Kinnear. This backed onto their original offices on the Royal Mile. The building bears the initials "JR" for John Ritchie, the founder of the company.

=== 20th century ===
On 19 December 1904, they moved to much larger new offices at the top of Cockburn Street, facing onto North Bridge, designed by Dunn & Findlay (Findlay being the son of the then owner). This huge building had taken three years to build and also had connected printworks on Market Street (in 2024 the City Art Centre). The printworks connected below road level direct to Waverley station in an efficient production line.

In 1953 the newspaper was bought by Canadian millionaire Roy Thomson who was in the process of building a large media group. The paper was bought in 1995 by David and Frederick Barclay for £85 million. They moved the newspaper from its Edinburgh office on North Bridge, which is now an upmarket hotel, to modern offices in Holyrood Road designed by Edinburgh architects CDA, near the subsequent location of the Scottish Parliament Building.

The daily was awarded by the Society for News Design (SND) the World's Best Designed Newspaper for 1994.

In December 2005, The Scotsman along with its sister titles owned by The Scotsman Publications Ltd was acquired, in a £160 million deal, by Johnston Press, a company founded in Scotland and at the time one of the top three largest local newspaper publishers in the UK.

In 2012, The Scotsman was named Newspaper of the Year at the Scottish Press Awards.

In 2006 the Barclay Brothers sold Barclay House to Irish property magnate Lochlann Quinn, and in 2013 Scottish video games maker Rockstar North, of Grand Theft Auto fame, signed the lease, causing Johnston Press group to move out in June 2014. Johnston Press have downsized to refurbished premises at Orchard Brae House in Queensferry Road, Edinburgh, a move which was quoted as saving the group £1million per annum in rent.

The newspaper backed a 'No' vote in the referendum on Scottish independence.

In November 2018, Johnston Press filed for administration. Shortly after filing for administration, the company was bought out by JPIMedia, a company which was bought by former Daily Mirror executive David Montgomery's new National World group in 2020.

In July 2023 an extra 52 years were added to the archive alongside the previous archives (1951–2002).

== Editors ==
1817: William Ritchie
1817: Charles Maclaren
1818: John Ramsay McCulloch
1843: John Hill Burton (acting)
1846: Alexander Russel
1876: Robert Wallace
1880: Charles Alfred Cooper
1905: John Pettigrew Croal
1924: George A. Waters
1944: James Murray Watson
1955: John Buchanan (acting)
1956: Alastair Dunnett
1972: Eric MacKay
1985: Chris Baur
1988: Magnus Linklater
1994: Andrew Jaspan
1995: James Seaton
1997: Martin Clarke
1998: Alan Ruddock
2000: Tim Luckhurst
2000: Rebecca Hardy
2001: Iain Martin
2004: John McGurk
2006: Mike Gilson
2009: John McLellan
2012: Ian Stewart
2017: Frank O'Donnell
2020: Euan McGrory
2021: Neil McIntosh
2024: Alan Young

== See also ==
- List of newspapers in Scotland
- List of newspapers by date
