= Faith (disambiguation) =

Faith is confidence or trust in a particular religious belief system. It often refers to:

- Religion, any specific system of belief ("one's faith")
  - Religious belief, the belief in the reality of the mythological, supernatural, or spiritual aspects of a religion
  - Faiths in specific religions:
    - Faith in Buddhism
    - Faith in Christianity
    - Jewish principles of faith
- Trust (social science) in a person or entity
  - Good faith, bona fides, the mental and moral state of honesty
    - Uberrima fides (Utmost good faith), the legal doctrine of certain contractual obligations
  - Bad faith, a legal concept in which a malicious motive on the part of a party in a lawsuit undermines their case

Faith may also refer to:

== Places in the United States ==
- Faith, Minnesota
- Faith, Missouri
- Faith, North Carolina
- Faith, South Dakota

== Media, arts and entertainment ==
=== Fictional characters ===
- Faith (comics), a superheroine in DC Comics
- Faith (Ninjago), in Ninjago
- Faith Connors, the protagonist in the action-adventure video game Mirror's Edge
- Faith Herbert, a superhero in the Valiant comics universe
- Faith Lehane, a fictional character for the television series Buffy the Vampire Slayer and Angel, portrayed by Eliza Dushku
- Faith Newman, from the American soap opera The Young and the Restless
- Faith Seed, in the video game Far Cry 5

=== Film and television ===
- Faith (1916 film) or The Virtuous Outcast, a 1916 American silent film
- Faith (1919 film), a 1919 American film directed by Charles Swickard and Rex Wilson
- Faith (1920 film), an American silent romantic drama film
- Faith (British TV series), a 1994 two part TV miniseries
- Faith (South Korean TV series), a 2012 fusion fantasy-historical-medical series
- "Faith" (Battlestar Galactica), a 2008 television episode
- "Faith" (Law & Order: Criminal Intent), a 2002 television episode
- "Faith" (Stargate Universe), a 2010 television episode
- "Faith" (Supernatural), a 2006 television episode
- "Faith" (The Walking Dead), a 2022 television episode

=== Music ===
==== Albums ====
- Faith (The Cure album), 1981
- Faith (Dynamic Praise album), 2001
- Faith (Eyes of Eden album), 2007
- Faith (Faith Evans album), 1995
- Faith (Faith Hill album), 1998
- Faith (George Michael album), 1987
- Faith (H_{2}O album), 1984
- Faith (Hyde album), 2006
- Faith (Pop Smoke album), 2021
- Faith (Rise and Fall album), 2012
- Faith: A Holiday Album, 1999 album by Kenny G
- Faith: A Hymns Collection, a 2006 album by Avalon

==== Songs ====
- "Faith" (Celine Dion song), 2003
- "Faith" (Galantis and Dolly Parton song), 2019
- "Faith" (George Michael song), 1987
- "Faith" (Ghost song), 2018
- "Faith" (Lords of the Underground song), 1995
- "Faith" (Rina Aiuchi song), 2001
- "Faith" (Stevie Wonder song), 2016
- "Faith" (The Weeknd song), 2020
- "Faith", a song by Jordin Sparks from Battlefield
- "Faith", a song by Luscious Jackson from Fever In Fever Out
- "Faith", a song by Calvin Harris from Motion
- "Faith", a song by Nana Mizuki from Hybrid Universe
- "Faith (In the Power of Love)" by Rozalla, 1991

==== Performers ====
- Faith (band), a doom metal group

=== Other uses in media, arts and entertainment ===
- Faith (novel), first in the Faith, Hope, Charity espionage trilogy of novels by Len Deighton
- Faith: The Unholy Trinity, a trilogy of retro style horror video games

== People ==
- Faith (given name), an English feminine given name

=== Surname ===
- Adam Faith (1940–2003), English pop singer
- Bob Faith (born 1963/1964), American businessman, founder, chairman and CEO of Greystar Real Estate Partners
- Horace Faith (?–2015), Jamaican reggae singer
- Paloma Faith (born 1981), English singer and actress
- Percy Faith (1908–1976), Canadian bandleader and composer
- Saint Faith, or Saint Foi, third-century AD French saint

=== Middle name ===
- Cora Faith Walker, American lawyer and politician

=== Nickname ===
- Corey Taylor (born 1973), American musician nicknamed "Faith"

== Ships ==
- SS Faith, the first concrete ship built in the US
- MV Empire Faith, a British CAM (catapult aircraft merchant) ship, converted to cargo ship in 1943

== Other uses ==
- Bad faith (existentialism), mauvaise foi, a philosophical concept wherein one denies one's total freedom, instead choosing to behave as an inert object
- Fáith, the Irish for "prophet, seer"
- Faith (dog) (2002–2014), bipedal dog, born with only three legs
- Faith (shoe retailer), British shoe company
- Faith 7, name given to the space capsule, by its pilot, in the 1963 US space mission Mercury-Atlas 9
- Hurricane Faith, a tropical cyclone which reached the Faeroe Islands, part of the 1966 Atlantic hurricane season
- Faith, a magazine published by the Roman Catholic Diocese of Lansing
- Faith (meteorite), a chondrite meteorite

== See also ==
- Faith-based schools
- Faith healing
- Faithfulness
- Leap of faith (disambiguation)
- The Faith (disambiguation)
- Faithful (disambiguation)
- Faithless (disambiguation)
- Unfaithful (disambiguation)
