= Faithfull =

Faithfull may refer to:

People

- Charles Faithfull (1903–1979), English international rugby union player
- Dean Faithfull (born 1987), English professional gridiron football placekicker
- Emily Faithfull (1835–1895), English women's rights activist, founder of The Victoria Press
- James Faithfull (1817–1873), English first-class cricketer and clergyman
- Leila Faithfull (1896–1994), British artist
- Lilian Faithfull CBE (1865–1952), an English teacher, headmistress, women's rights advocate, magistrate, social worker and humanitarian
- Lucy Faithfull, Baroness Faithfull, a British social worker
- Marianne Faithfull (1946–2025), English singer and actress
- Valentine Faithfull (1820–1894), British clergyman and cricketer

Other

- Faithfull Majesty (Rex Fidelissimus), a sobriquet attached to the Portuguese monarchy
- "Faithfull", a song by Pearl Jam from their 1998 album Yield

== See also ==
- Faithful (disambiguation)
