= Faithful =

Faithful may refer to:

== Film and television ==
- Faithful (1910 film), an American comedy short directed by D. W. Griffith
- Faithful (1936 film), a British musical drama directed by Paul L. Stein
- Faithful (1996 film), an American crime comedy directed by Paul Mazursky
- The Faithful, a Chinese film of 2018
- "Faithful" (The Handmaid's Tale), a television episode
- "The Faithful" (Law & Order: Criminal Intent), a television episode
- "The Faithful" (Supergirl), a television episode

== Music ==
=== Albums ===
- Faithful (Dusty Springfield album), recorded 1971, released 2015
- Faithful (Hi-Five album) or the title song, 1993
- Faithful (Jenn Bostic album) or the title song, 2015
- Faithful (Marcin Wasilewski album), 2011
- Faithful (Todd Rundgren album), 1976
- Faithful, a Hillsong album, 2003

=== Songs ===
- "Faithful" (Common song), 2005
- "Faithful" (Go West song), 1992
- "Faithful" (Macklemore song), 2022
- "Faithful", by Drake from Views, 2016
- "Faithful", by Julian Lennon from Photograph Smile, 1998
- "Faithful", by Marvin, Welch & Farrar from Marvin, Welch & Farrar, 1971
- "Faithful", by the Original 7ven from Condensate, 2011
- "Faithful", by Ornette Coleman from The Empty Foxhole, 1966
- "Faithful", by Pearl Jam from Yield, 1998
- "Faithful", by Tyga from Kyoto, 2018

== Mathematics ==
- Faithful representation
- Faithful group action
- Faithful module
- Faithful functor

== Other uses ==
- Faithful (baptized Catholic), the collected members baptized into the church
- Faithful (book), a 2004 baseball book by Stephen King and Stewart O'Nan
- Faithfulness, the concept of unfailing loyalty
- Faithfuls, group in The Traitors

== See also ==
- Faith (disambiguation)
- Faithfull (disambiguation)
- Faithfully (disambiguation)
- Faithless (disambiguation)
- Old Faithful
- Unfaithful (disambiguation)
