= Faithless (disambiguation) =

Faithless is a British electronica band.

Faithless may also refer to:

== Film and television ==
- Faithless (1932 film), starring Tallulah Bankhead and Robert Montgomery
- Faithless (2000 film), a Swedish film directed by Liv Ullmann
- Faithless (Kenyan TV series) , a 2023 Kenyan television crime drama series
- Faithless (Swedish TV series) (Trolösa), a 2025 television drama series directed by Tomas Alfredson
- "Faithless" (Coupling), a 2002 television episode

== Literature ==
- The Faithless (Clark novel), a 2023 fantasy novel by C.L. Clark
- Faithless (Slaughter novel), a 2005 crime novel by Karin Slaughter
- Faithless, a 2019 comic book, created by Brian Azzarello and Maria Llovet, and published by Boom! Studios

== Music ==
- Faithless (Marianne Faithfull album), a 1977 album by Marianne Faithfull
- Faithless (Richard Thompson album), a 2004 live album by Richard Thompson
- The Faithless (Nights Like These album), the debut 2006 album by Nights Like These
- "Faithless", a song by All That Remains from For We Are Many
- "Faithless", a song by Black Veil Brides from Black Veil Brides
- "Faithless", a song by Daniel Johns from Talk
- "Faithless (Zero Signal)", a song by Fear Factory from Remanufacture – Cloning Technology
- "Faithless", a song by Rush from Snakes & Arrows

== Other ==
- Faithless servant, a legal doctrine
- Reporting name of the Soviet aircraft Mikoyan-Gurevich 23-01

== See also ==
- Unfaithful (disambiguation)
- Faithful (disambiguation)
- Faith (disambiguation)
