= John Ramsay L'Amy =

Scottish lawyer, phrenologist and early photographer

John Ramsay L’Amy of Dunkenny WS FRSE DL (1813-1892) was a Scottish lawyer, phrenologist and early photographer. To distinguish himself from his grandfather, of the same name, he was often styled “Younger Dunkenny”.

== Life ==
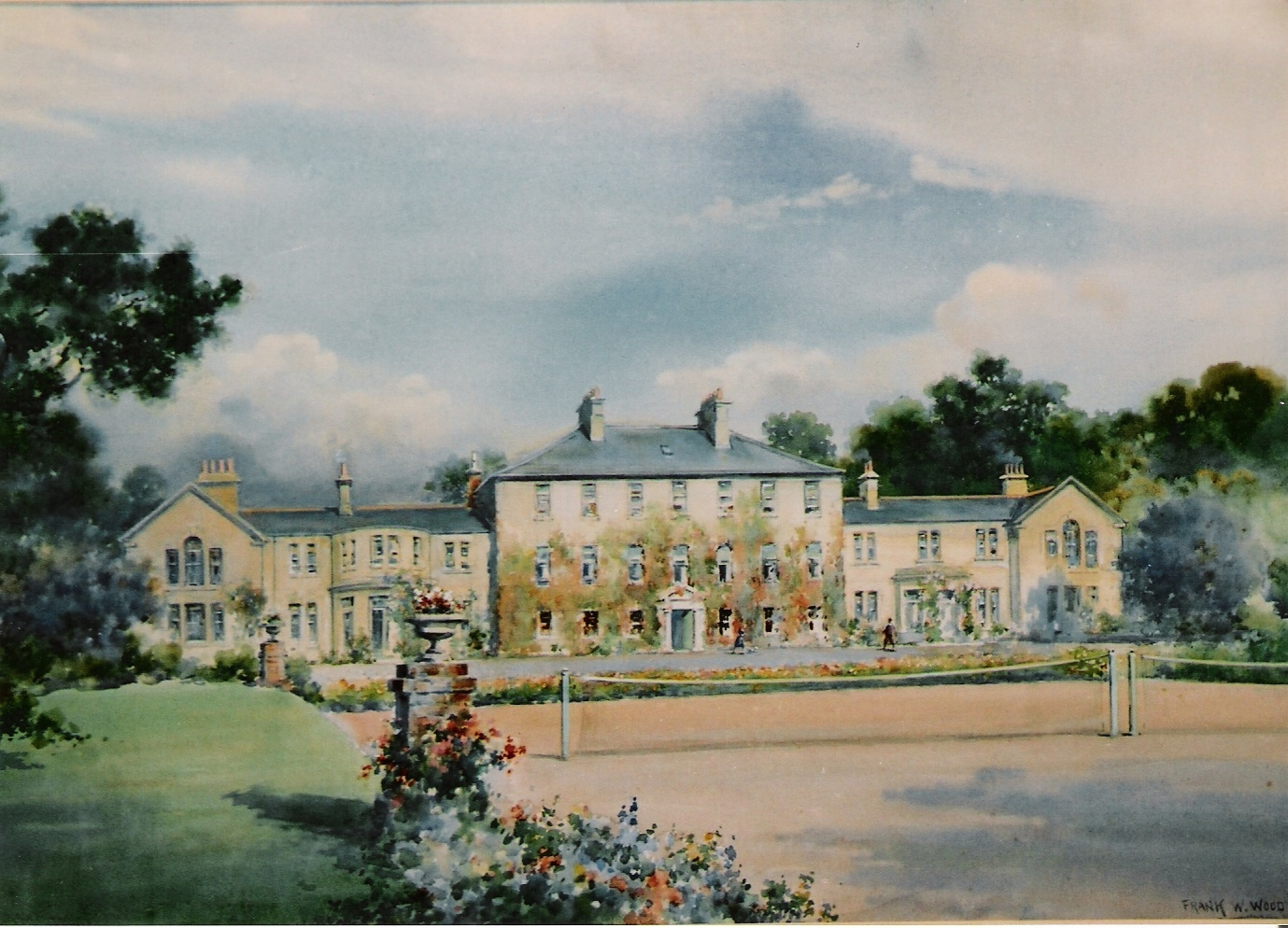
Mordington House

He was born at 27 Northumberland Street in Edinburgh on 9 April 1813 the son of James L'Amy FRSE and his wife Mary Carson. He was apprenticed to his lawyer neighbour George Combe (it being inappropriate to be apprenticed to your father in the legal world) at 25 Northumberland Street. Through Combe he acquired an interest in phrenology.

In 1845 he married Mary Riche Macleod Innes (1819-1875) at South Leith Parish Church and they appear to have emigrated to Coogee, New South Wales in Australia where their first child, Christine Ramsay L’Amy was born in 1846. They returned to Scotland around 1850, then living on the estate at Mordington in Berwickshire.

He was an early member of the Edinburgh Photographic Society (established 1861) and exhibited from 1864. Subjects included Eyemouth Harbour, Foulden, Ayton Castle, Norham Castle, Chirnside Bridge and at least 29 portraits.

In 1875, due to both his photographic and phrenological interests, he was elected a Fellow of the Royal Society of Edinburgh. His proposers were David Milne Home, Archibald Campbell Swinton, Sir Robert Christison, and Sir Andrew Douglas Maclagan.

He died on 26 March 1892 and is buried in Dean Cemetery in western Edinburgh.

== Family ==
Other children with his wife Mary included William Ramsay L’Amy (1850-1903), Norman Ramsay L’Amy (1854-1855) and Simpson MacLeod L’Amy (b.1860).

In 1885, following his wife's death in 1875, he married Adeline Attye, the widow of James Malcolm.

His aunt was the poet Agnes Lyon.
