= James L'Amy =

Scottish advocate and amateur phrenologist

James L'Amy of Dunkenny FRSE FRSSA (8 July 1772 – 15 January 1854) was a Scottish advocate and amateur phrenologist. He served as Sheriff of Forfar from 1819 until death.

== Life ==
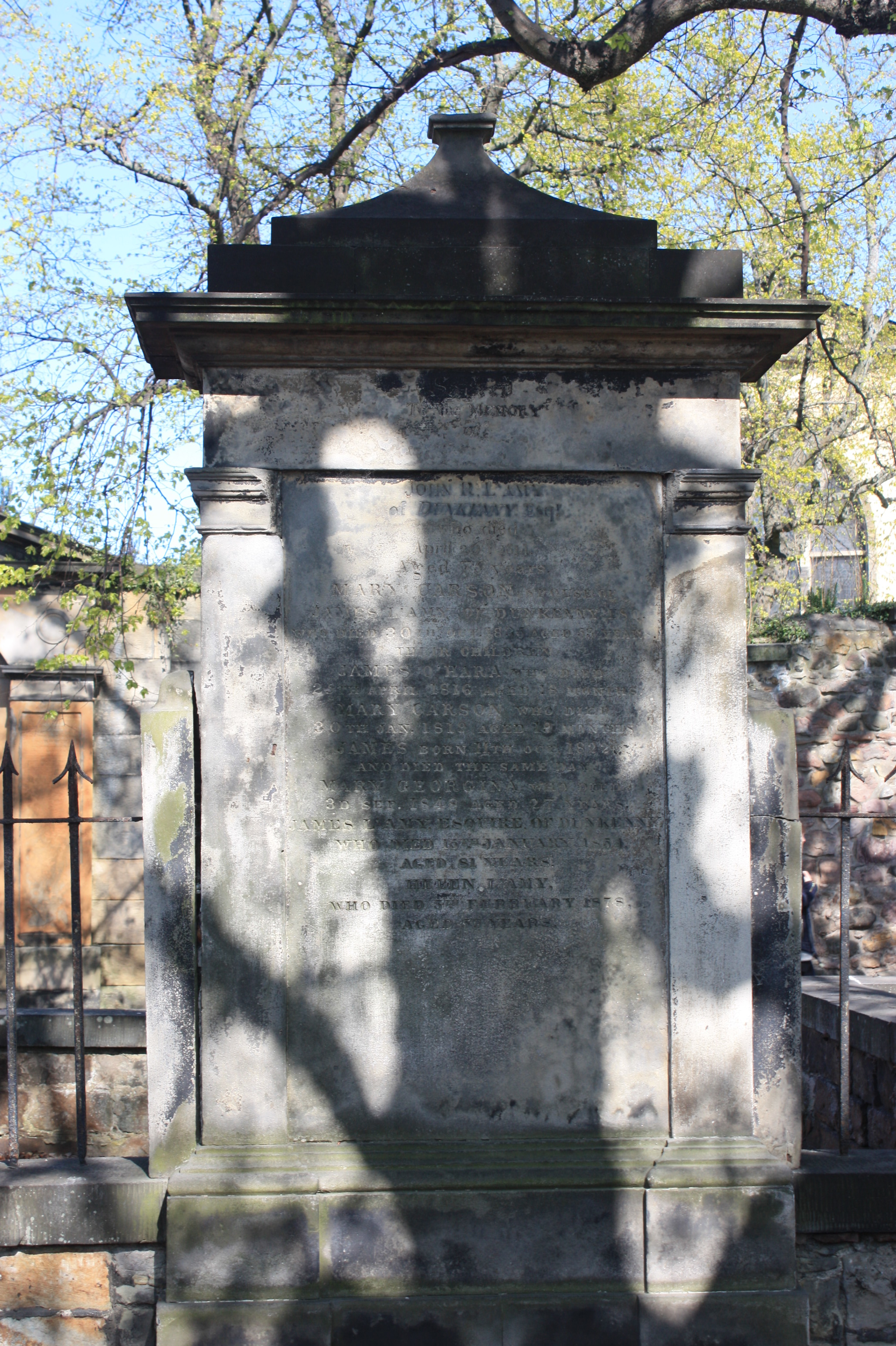
The grave of James L'Amy, Greyfriars Kirkyard, Edinburgh

L'Amy was born on 8 July 1772 the son of Agnes (née) Hamilton and John Ramsay L'Amy of Dunkenny, Forfarshire. His older sister was the Scottish poet Agnes Lyon. He studied law and qualified as an advocate in 1794.

In the 1820s he was living at 27 Northumberland Street next to the "father of phrenology" and fellow-lawyer, George Combe, at 25 Northumberland Street. Combe may have introduced L'Amy to phrenological thinking.

In 1830 he was elected a Fellow of the Royal Society of Edinburgh. His proposer was George Augustus Borthwick. He was Vice President of the Royal Scottish Society of Arts.

In 1852 he is listed as a director of the Scottish Naval and Military Academy on Lothian Road, Edinburgh.

He died on 15 January 1854 in Edinburgh and is buried with his wife and family in Greyfriars Kirkyard. The grave stands at the top end of the western extension facing the eastern gate into George Heriot's School.

== Family ==
In 1811 he married Mary Carson (d.1835). Their children included John Ramsay L'Amy (1813-1892).
