= Unfaithful =

Unfaithful may refer to:

- Someone who does not believe in the tenets of a religion
- Someone who violates a norm of sexual or emotional exclusivity with a romantic partner

== Film and television ==
- Unfaithful (1918 film), a silent short film directed by Thomas H. Ince and Charles Miller
- Unfaithful (1931 film), directed by John Cromwell
- The Unfaithful (1947 film), a film noir
- The Unfaithful (1953 film), a Mexican drama film
- Unfaithful (2002 film), a film starring Diane Lane and Richard Gere
- Unfaithful (2006 film), an Iranian comedy-romance film
- "Unfaithful" (House), a 2009 episode of House

== Music ==
- "Unfaithful" (song), a 2006 song by Rihanna
- "Unfaithful", a 2009 song by Stornoway
- "Los Infieles" (English: "The Unfaithful"), a song by Aventura

== See also ==
- Faithless (disambiguation)
- Faithful (disambiguation)
- Faith (disambiguation)
