= Fidelity =

Quality of faithfulness or loyalty to another person or group

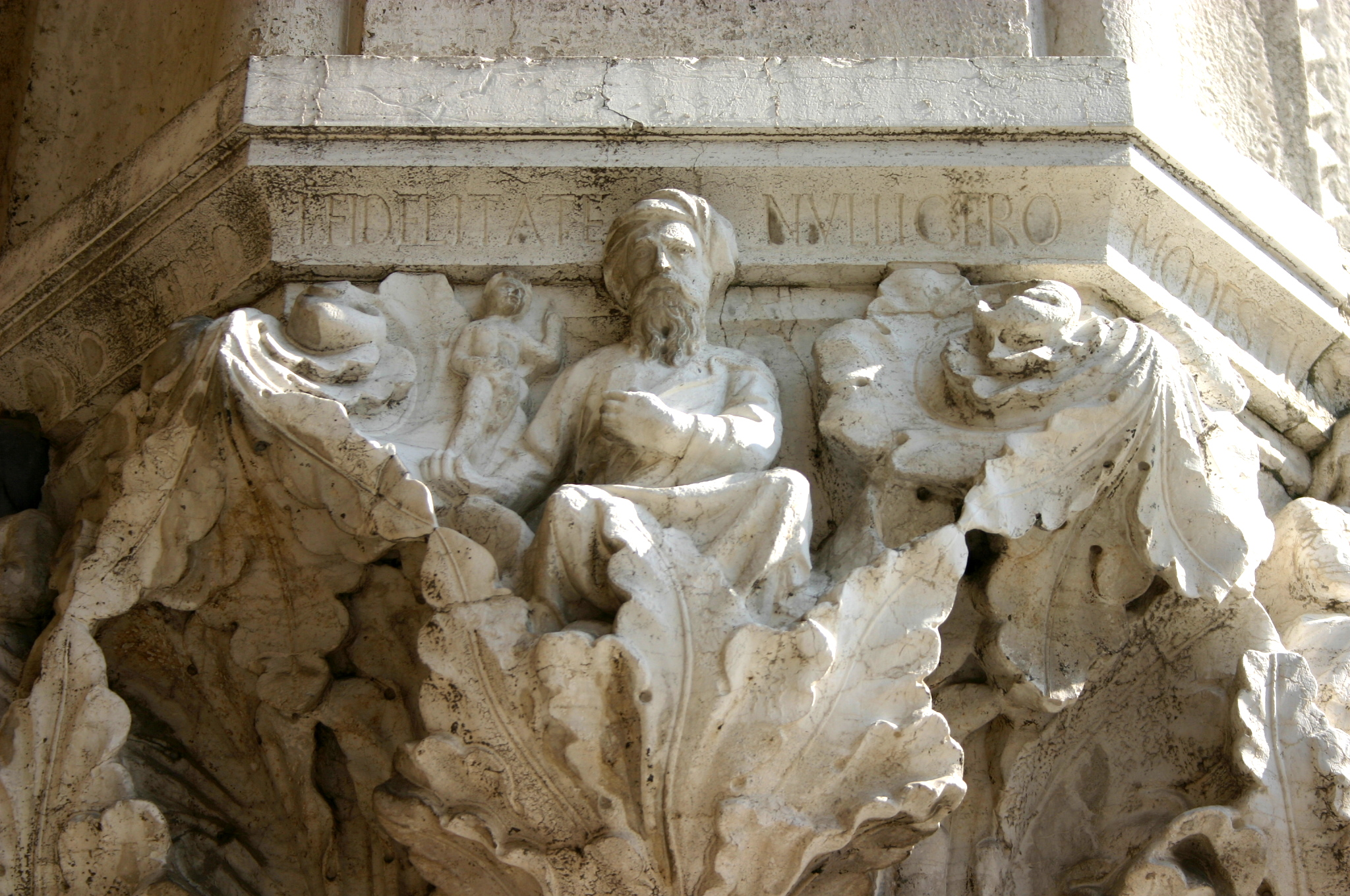
Palazzo Ducale in Venice: capital # 28 in the porch, featuring Virtues and vices — In fidelitate nulli gero (Fidelity)

Fidelity is the quality of faithfulness or loyalty. Its original meaning regarded duty in a broader sense than the related concept of fealty. Both derive from the Latin word fidēlis, meaning "faithful or loyal". In the City of London financial markets it has traditionally been used in the sense encompassed in the motto "my word is my bond".

== In moral philosophy ==
In moral philosophy, fidelity refers to a person who keeps agreements. Strong fidelity refers to a person who keeps agreements even if not mutually beneficial to the other person.

== Audio and electronics ==
In audio, "fidelity" denotes how accurately a copy reproduces its source. In the 1950s, the terms "high fidelity" or "hi-fi" were popularized for equipment and recordings which exhibited more accurate sound reproduction. For example, a worn gramophone record will have a lower fidelity than one in good condition, and a recording made by a low budget record company in the early 20th century is likely to have significantly less audio fidelity than a good modern recording. Similarly in electronics, fidelity refers to the correspondence of the output signal to the input signal, rather than sound quality, as in the popular internet connection technology "Wi-Fi".

The term "lo-fi" has existed since at least the 1950s, shortly after the acceptance of "hi-fi", but its definition evolved continuously between the 1970s and 2000s. In the 1976 edition of the Oxford Dictionary, lo-fi was added under the definition of "sound production less good in quality than 'hi-fi'", and in the glossary of the 1977 book The Tuning of the World, was defined as "unfavourable signal-to-noise ratio". In 2003, the Oxford Dictionary added a second definition: "A genre of rock music characterized by minimal production, giving a raw and unsophisticated sound." A third was added in 2008: "Unpolished, amateurish, or technologically unsophisticated, esp. as a deliberate aesthetic choice."

== Scientific modelling and simulation ==
In the fields of scientific modelling and simulation, fidelity refers to the degree to which a model or simulation reproduces the state and behaviour of a real world object, feature or condition. Fidelity is therefore a measure of the realism of a model or simulation. Simulation fidelity has also been described in the past as "degree of similarity". In quantum mechanics and optics, the fidelity of a field is calculated as an overlap integral of the field of interest with a reference or target field.

== Program evaluation ==
In the field of program evaluation, the term fidelity denotes how closely a set of procedures were implemented as they were supposed to have been. For example, it is difficult to draw conclusions from a study about formative assessment in school classrooms if the teachers are not able or willing to follow the procedures they received in training.

== Translation ==
In translation, fidelity is the extent to which a translation accurately renders the meaning of the source text, without distortion. It is contrasted with transparency, which is the extent to which a translation appears to a native speaker of the target language to have originally been written in that language.

== Biology ==
Fidelity, in Molecular Biology, refers to the accuracy of replication of genetic material. Replication errors result in mutations that can negatively affect cell viability and health, however, can provide genetic variation to a population.

== See also ==
- Classism – Discrimination on the basis of social class
- Erikson's theory of personality – Erikson's fidelity is the ability to commit to others and acceptance of others
- Infidelity – Cheating, adultery, or having an affair
- Knighthood – Honorary title awarded for service to a state or church
- Monasticism – Religious way of life
- Rankism – Rank-based discrimination
