= Edinburgh Photographic Society =

Organization in City of Edinburgh, Scotland

The Edinburgh Photographic Society is a photographic society based in Edinburgh, Scotland. It was established in 1861. The society awards medals annually to photographers of excellence.

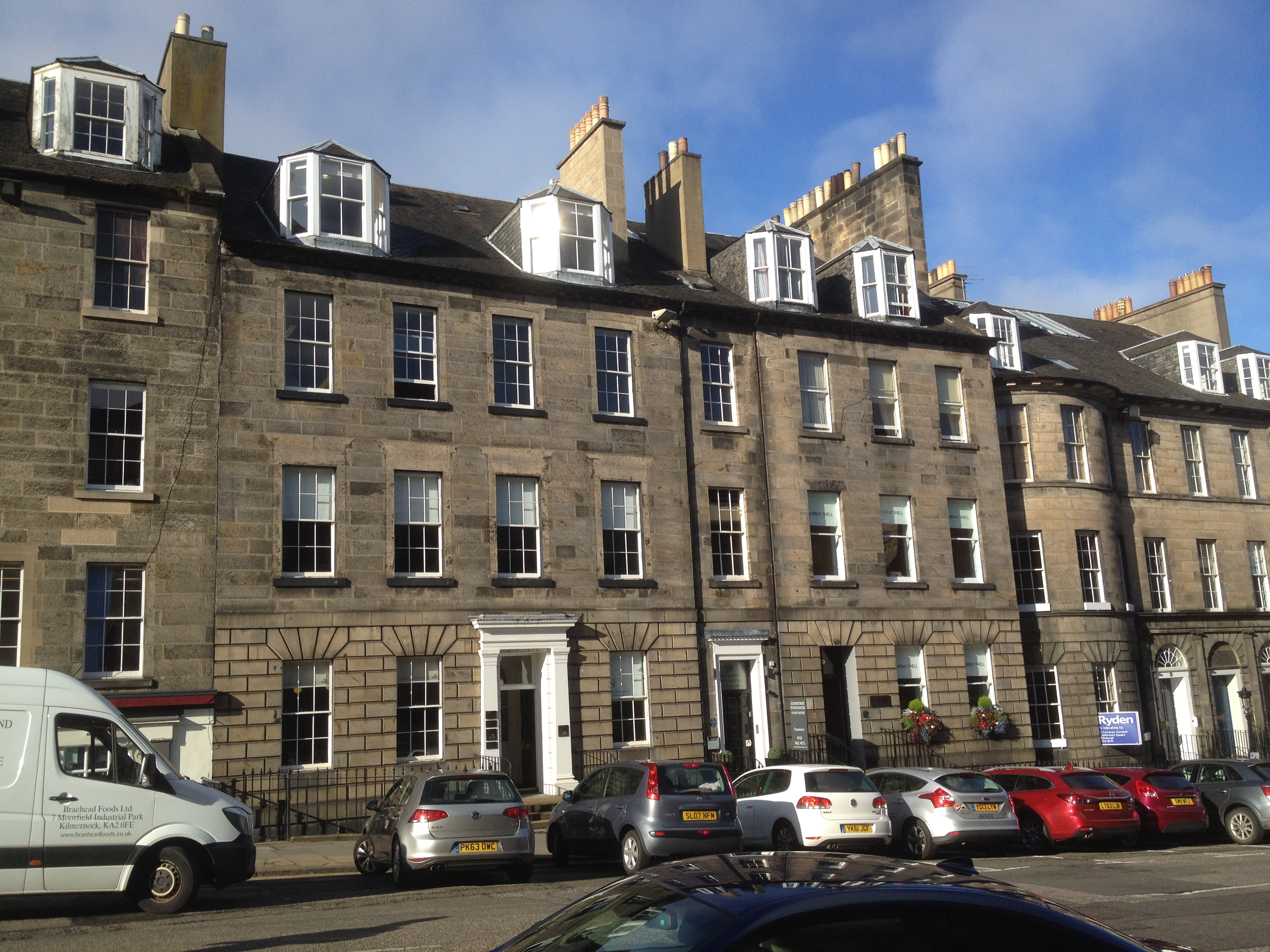
38 North Castle Street, the Society's first owned building

It began in a small back room at 81 South Bridge in rivalry to the more formal Photographic Society of Scotland. In the first year the regular meetings were held at the Queen Street Hall (6 Queen Street) before moving to the National Bible Society Halls at 5 St Andrew Square. Not until 1892 did they acquire their own premises; 38 North Castle Street.

== Notable Members ==
- James David Marwick the first President of the Society
- J. Traill Taylor, later the editor of the British Journal of Photography
- John Ramsay L'Amy FRSE
- James Valentine
- George Henry Slight
- David Drummond
- Archibald Burns

Honorary members included Fox Talbot, Sir David Brewster, Lyon Playfair, Piazzi Smyth and George Shadbolt.
