= Nights Like These =

American metal band

- Origin: Memphis, Tennessee, U.S.
- Genres: Deathcore, sludge metal
- Years active: 2003−2008, 2013–present
- Labels: Victory, Smith Seven
- Members: Billy Bottom; Matt Qualls; Derren Saucier; Sebastian Rios; Patrick Leatherwood
- Past members: Anthoney Carter; Buddy Forbess
- Website: nightslikethese.bandcamp.com

Nights Like These is an American metal band from Memphis, Tennessee, influenced by death metal and sludge metal.

== History ==
In 2006, Nights Like These released their debut, The Faithless, to overall positive reviews on Victory Records. They released their most recent album, Sunlight at Secondhand, on October 16, 2007, on Victory Records.

In 2008, the band went on hiatus for the first part of the year. It was later announced (via the band's Myspace) that drummer Patrick Leatherwood had left the band due to other commitments. The band announced that they were scaling back on touring and albums, as opposed to a full-time touring schedule with yearly albums. The Victory Records website has taken off Nights Like These from their "Artist" page, begetting rumors that the band and Victory have split. On July 15, 2008, Nights Like These posted a Myspace blog confirming their split with Victory and new drummer Todd Pasterniak. It was announced on October 5, 2009, on Myspace that members of Nights Like These were working on a new project under the name Panther Piss.

A release party for their 7" was held on March 6. As of 2013, the band is back together, playing a variety of shows in their hometown of Memphis.

== Band members ==
- Billy Bottom – vocals (2003–2008, 2013–present)
- Matt Qualls − guitar, vocals
- Derren Saucier − guitar
- Sebastian Rios − bass, backing vocals (2003–2008, 2013–present)
- Patrick Leatherwood- drums, backing vocals (2003–2008, 2013–present)

Past members

- Anthoney Carter – guitar
- Buddy Forbess – guitar
- Todd Pasterniak – drums

== Albums ==
- The Only Clown I'm Down with Is Gacy (3-track EP, 2004, limited release)
- God City Sessions (2005, unreleased)
- The Faithless (2006, Victory)
- Sunlight at Secondhand (2007, Victory)
- Old Youth Culture (2015, self-released)
