= Sunlight at Secondhand =

Studio album by Nights Like These
- Released: October 16, 2007
- Genre: Deathcore; Sludge metal
- Length: 41:30
- Label: Victory

Nights Like These chronology
The Faithless (2006)	Sunlight at Secondhand (2007)	Old Youth Culture (2015)

Professional ratings
Review scores
Source	Rating
MetalSucks	4.5/5 stars

Sunlight at Secondhand is the second full-length album by Nights Like These, released on Victory Records. It has less of a heavy metal sound than its predecessor, The Faithless.

== Critical reception ==
AllMusic wrote: "Fans of artier, complex bands like Neurosis and Isis will be able to latch on to the shifting textures and colors in the music, but people who just want to hear something heavy won't be disappointed, either."

== Track listing ==
1. Heart Of The Wound - 3:52
2. Black The Sun - 3:47
3. Samsara - 4:04
4. Bay Of Pigs - 4:43
5. Collective Unconscious - 4:08
6. Claw Your Way Out - 5:05
7. Empty Lungs - 3:56
8. Veteran Thieves - 2:08
9. Electric Winds - 4:58
10. King - 4:44

== Personnel ==
- Billy Bottom - vocals
- Matt Qualls - guitar
- Patrick Leatherwood - drums
- Derren Saucier - guitar
- Sebastian Rios - bass guitar
- Chris Owens - engineer
