= David Drummond (minister) =

Scottish Evangelical minister

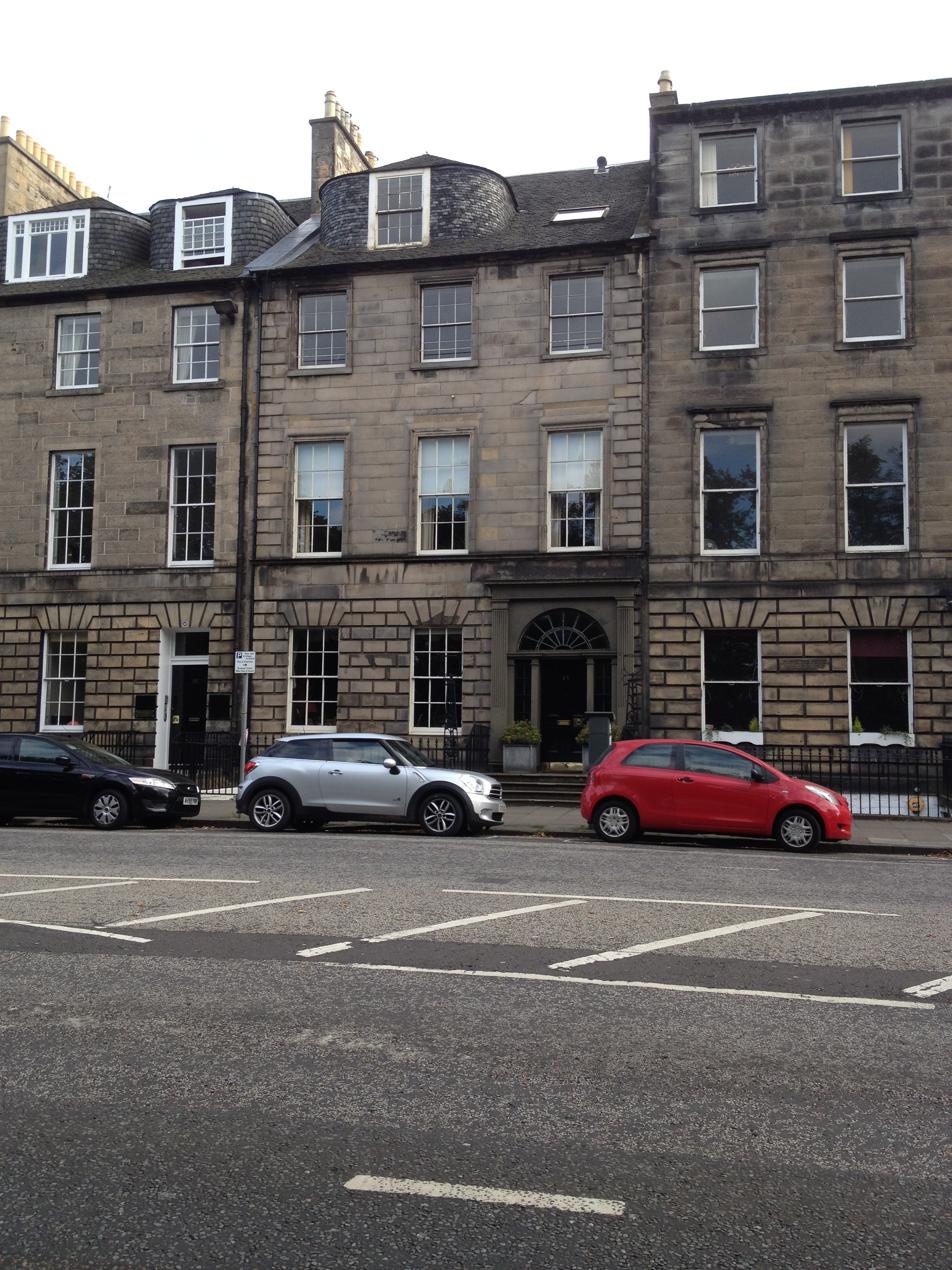
51, Queen Street, Edinburgh, birthplace of David Drummond

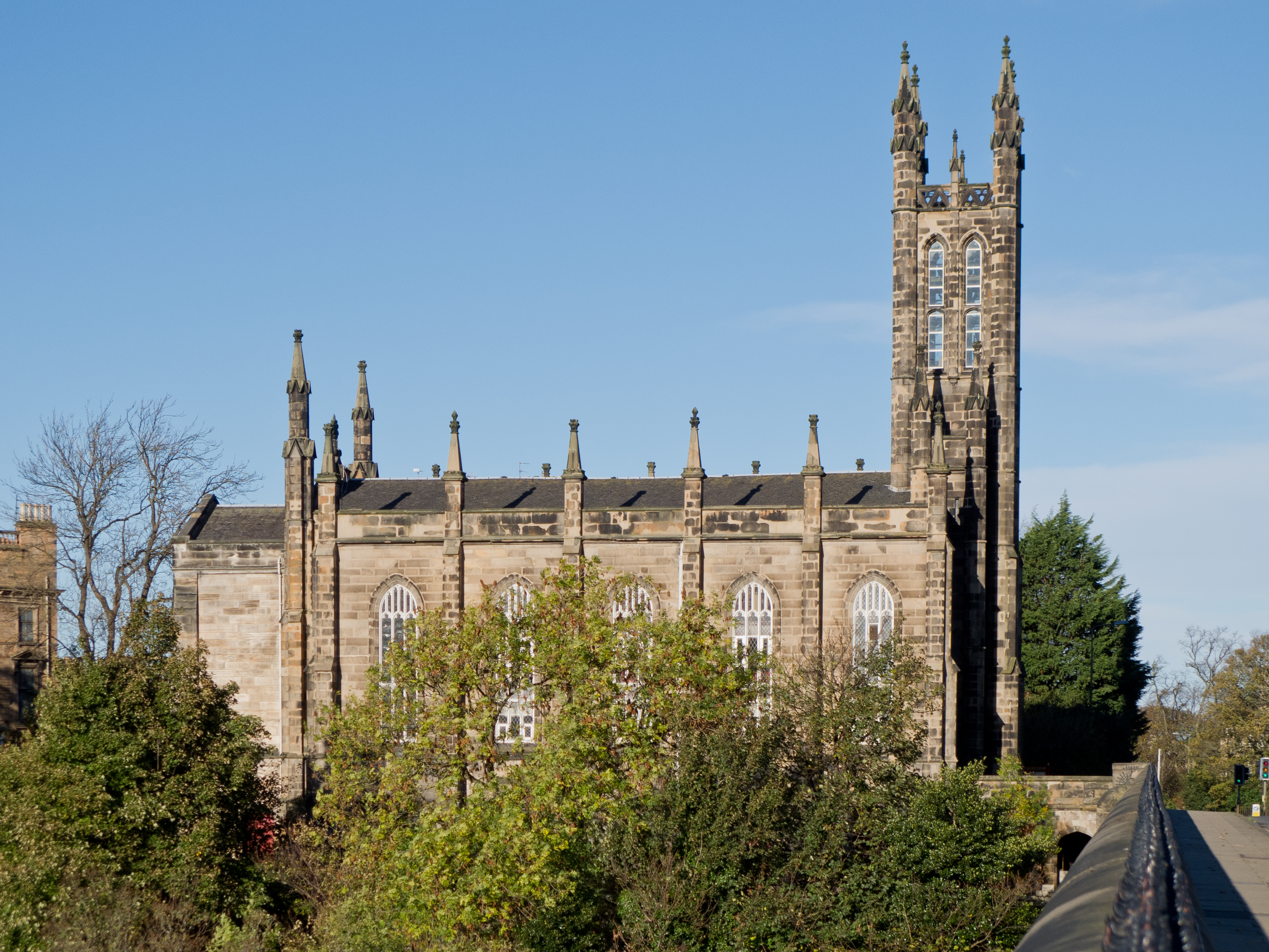
Former Holy Trinity Episcopal Church, Edinburgh

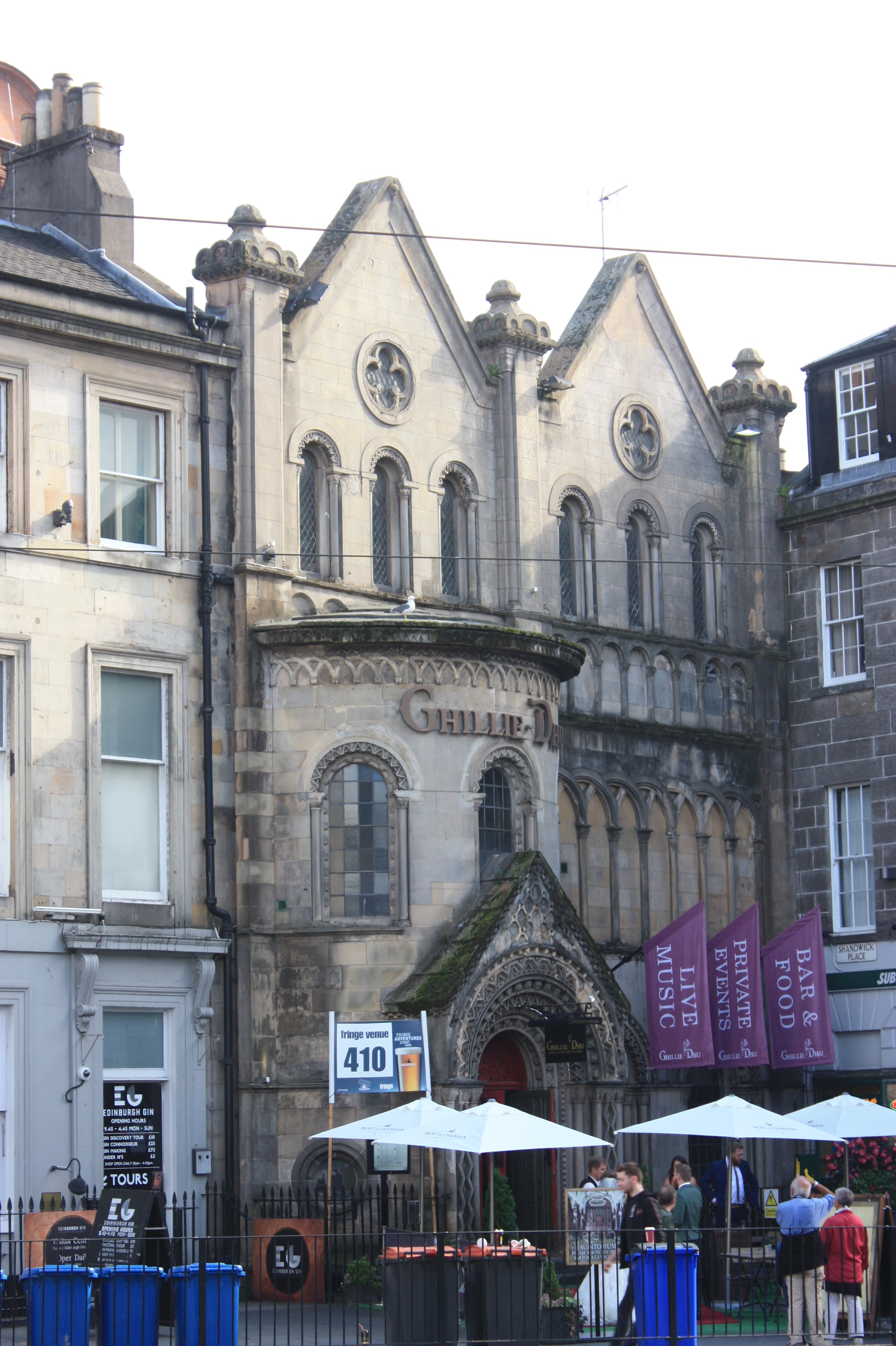
St Thomas's Church, Rutland Place, Edinburgh

David Thomas Kerr Drummond FRSE (1805–1877) was a Scottish Evangelical minister. A previous member of the Scottish Episcopal Church, he resigned in 1842 to establish the English Church in Edinburgh. This split is known in Scottish religious history as "The Drummondite Schism". He is separately noted as an early amateur photographer.

== Life ==
He was born in Edinburgh, the son of James Drummond of Strageath on 25 August 1805. His father appears to have been an advocate, living at the then new and desirable address of 51, Queen Street in Edinburgh's New Town. He attended the High School in Edinburgh and studied Divinity at the University of Edinburgh and then Worcester College, Oxford, graduating with a BA from the University of Oxford in 1830. He was ordained as a deacon in the Church of England in 1830, and served as a curate in Compton Greenfield, Gloucestershire, 1830-32. He was ordained as priest in January 1832.

In 1832, he returned to Edinburgh to take over Old St Paul's on Carrubbers Close in the Old Town. In 1837 he moved to the then-new Holy Trinity Church (now Rhema Scotland) on the west edge of Dean Bridge, serving the expanding Episcopal Church in Edinburgh (which always had a high percentage of English inhabitants).

Drummond appears highly affected by the Oxford Movement of 1840. In October 1842 his religious views came to a head in a series of open letters to Bishop Charles Terrot (perhaps fuelled by the impending doom of his church structure). The conclusion of this was a growing schism, causing Drummond to resign from the Scottish Episcopal Church. He was then encouraged to set up a parallel church that claimed allegiance to the Church of England and continued the bulk of the previous Episcopal customs, but with more freedom of prayer outwith the church setting. This was thereafter known as the English Church in Edinburgh. This split was parallel to, but technically separate from, the more famous split in the Church of Scotland, generally termed the Disruption of 1843. Drummond's lead formed a pattern which several other Scottish Episcopalian Churches followed.

Drummond's new church was St Thomas's English Episcopal Chapel on Rutland Place/Rutland Street (at the west end of Princes Street), a location which was described as "annoyingly close" to the established Episcopal Church of St John the Evangelist, Edinburgh, sitting more or less opposite the entrance to the pre-existing church. St Thomas's was designed by David Cousin, and, curiously building was begun in 1842, indicating a pre-emption of the entire schism, and indicating that the series of letters to Bishop Terrot were merely to formalise an already concluded decision. The first call to a public meeting to establish a new church appears in the Caledonian Mercury newspaper on 27 October 1842, predating much of the debate between Drummond and Terrot. Drummond's address at this time is shown as 4 Bruntsfield Place.

Despite bringing in an Englishman, Richard Hibbs, as his curate around 1852, this did not go well and Hibbs created a further split in 1854 to create a separate Episcopal Church (St Vincent's Chapel, Edinburgh) on St Vincent Place in the New Town (completed as Christ's English Episcopal Chapel in 1857). Hibbs was replaced by Valentine Faithfull.

Drummond was a keen and early amateur photographer, being in both the Edinburgh Photographic Society (1861) and Photographic Society of Scotland. He presented a new portable photographic tent to the latter in 1862 and served as their vice president from 1864 to 1867. In 1868 he was elected a fellow of the Royal Society of Edinburgh, his proposer being John Hutton Balfour. A photograph of Loch Earn dated 1864 is held by the Scottish National Portrait Gallery. This appears to for one of 16 photographs exhibited by Drummond in 1864, demonstrating a tour of Killin, St Fillans and Loch Earn earlier that year.

In later life he lived at 6 Montpelier, a tenement flat in the Bruntsfield district of Edinburgh.

He retired in 1875, aged 70. He died on 9 June 1877 while in Pitlochry, Perthshire but was returned to Edinburgh for burial in Duddingston Churchyard. The grave lies on the south wall towards the south-west.

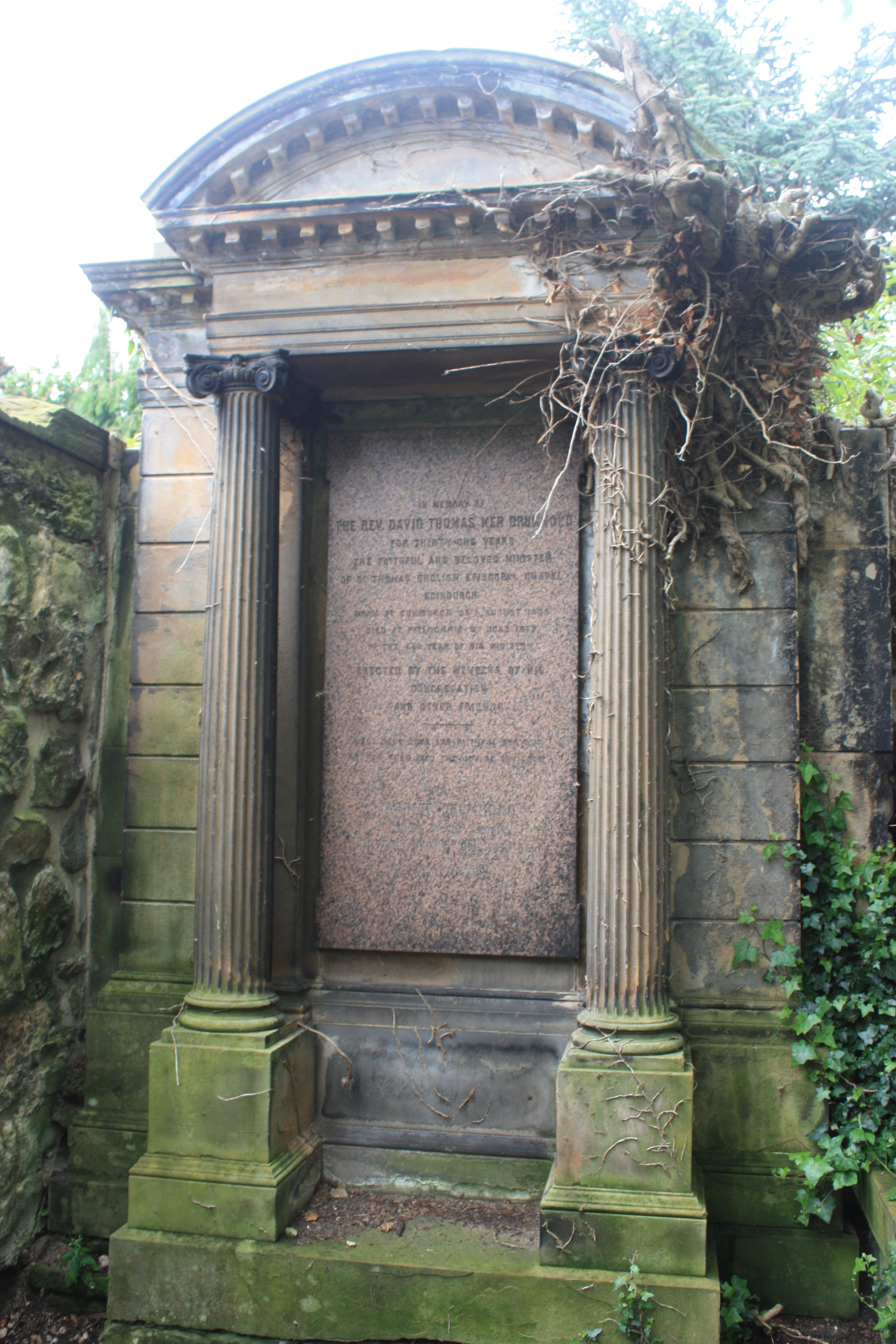
Drummond's grave in Duddingston Kirkyard

== Publications ==
- Reasons for Withdrawing from the Scotch Episcopal Church (1842) pamphlet
- The Scottish Communion Office Examined (1842) pamphlet
- Reply to the Episcopal Clergy of Edinburgh (1842)
- Historical Sketch of Episcopacy in Scotland (1845)

== Artistic recognition ==
An early photograph of Drummond by Hill & Adamson (c.1843) is held by the Department of Special Collections in Glasgow University.
