= The Faith =

The Faith may refer to:

- The Faith (American band), an American hardcore punk band
- The Faith (album), a 2005 album from Christian hip hop artist Da’ T.R.U.T.H
- "The Faith" (The Amazing World of Gumball), a television episode

== See also ==
- Faith (disambiguation)
- Faith Band
