= Archibald Burns (photographer) =

Scottish photographer (1831–1880)

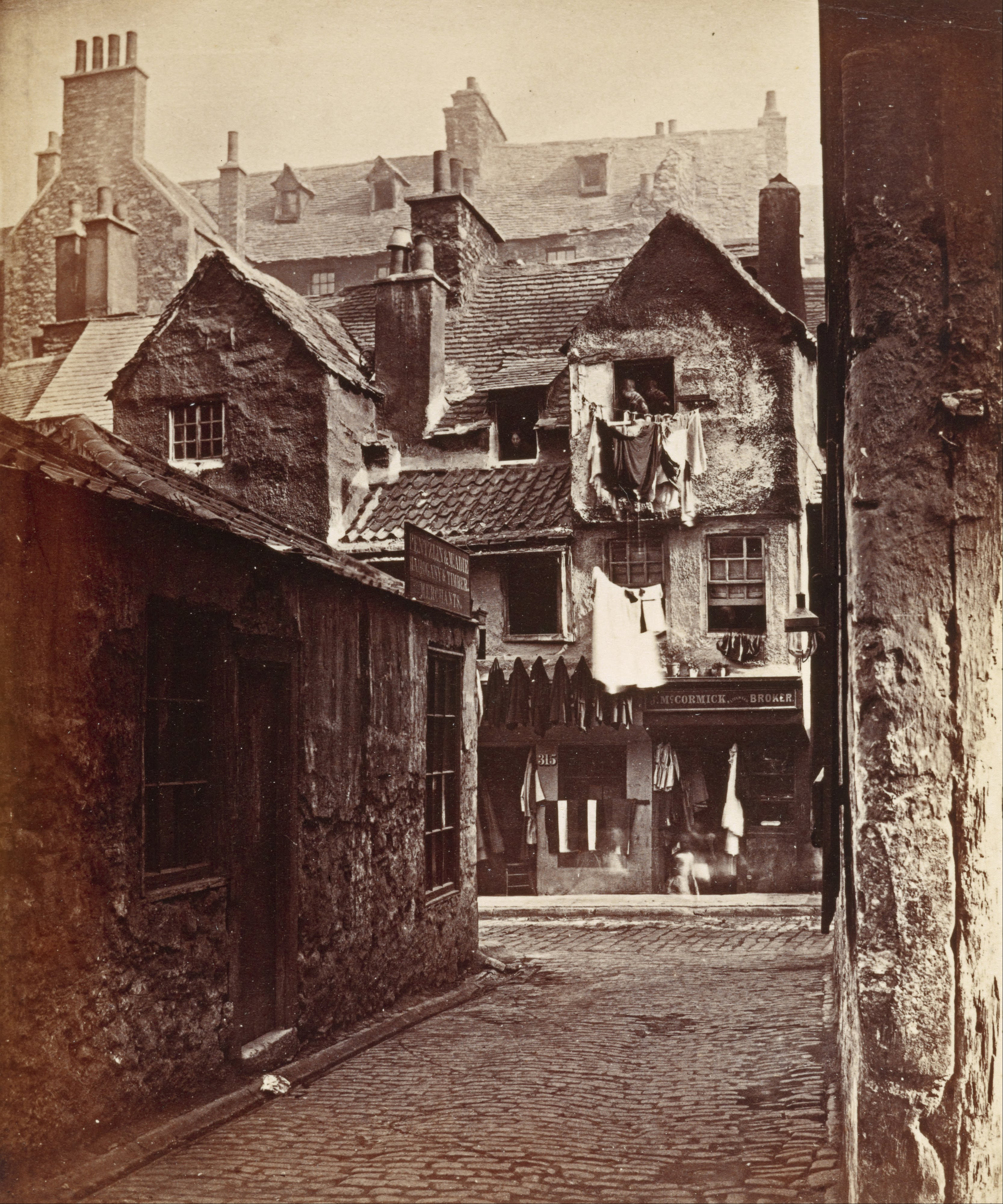
Reproduction of photograph by Burns titled 'Timber Fronted House, Cowgate' in Edinburgh

Archibald Burns (1831–1880) was a Scottish photographer based in Edinburgh, Scotland, and active from 1858 to 1880. He documented the city through various publications and recorded the historic buildings in a section of the city that was cleared for improvements in the 1860s.

== Life and career ==
Burns became active in photography as an amateur in the 1850s. He became a member of the Photographic Society of Scotland in 1858 and was one of the first members of the Edinburgh Photographic Society in 1861. He pursued primarily landscape and architectural photography and capitalized on new tourist markets for illustrated books and views in the latter part of the nineteenth century.

Burns first professional photography studio was located at 22 Calton Stairs from 1861 to 1871, at which point he established his business at the Rock House until 1880. Through parts of 1870 and 1871, Burns shared the Rock House, which had earlier been the studio of important Scottish calotypists Hill & Adamson, with Glaswegian photographer Thomas Annan.

Burns died in 1880 and was buried at Warriston Cemetery. The contents of his studio – inventory, materials, and hardware – were put up for sale in May of that year. He was survived by his wife, Jane, and their two young daughters.

== Works ==
Archibald Burns promoted himself as a landscape photographer and sold individual prints, stereographs, cabinet cards, and magic lantern slides of views of Edinburgh and surrounding area.

Burns illustrated two books on Edinburgh published in 1868, three years before he took his series of photographs of closes and wynds for the Edinburgh Improvement Trust (January and February 1871). The text in Picturesque "Bits" from Old Edinburgh (1st ed. 1868) emphasizes the architectural history of Scotland and the importance of photography in preserving the knowledge of fading vernacular styles and ends with a questions regarding the future of Scottish architecture. The book is illustrated with 15 tipped-in albumen prints by Burns and 8 woodcuts by Charles Paton after drawings in Daniel Wilson's Memorials of Edinburgh in the Olden Time (2 vols., 1st ed., 1847), some of which date from the 1830s.

The Edinburgh Improvement Trust appointed Burns to record the recently cleared and derelict buildings between the Cowgate and Chambers Street in 1871. He produced twenty six prints that are now an important historic record of this area. Unlike the haunting work by Glasgow photographer Thomas Annan for that city's Improvement Trust, Burns's photographs of Edinburgh's closes and wynds record the area as ruined and half-destroyed buildings without any residents present.

Despite both working out of Rock House in 1870–71, it is not certain whether or not Burns saw Annan's photographs of Old Glasgow.

== List of publications ==
- Ballantyne, R. M and Archibald Burns. Photographs of Edinburgh with descriptive letterpress. Glasgow: Andrew Duthie, 1867. The photographs attributed to Archibald Burns in some editions and the photographs vary between editions.
- Burns, Archibald, and Thomas Henderson. Picturesque "Bits" from Old Edinburgh: A Series of Photographs by Archibald Burns; with descriptive and historical notes by Thomas Henderson. Edmonston and Douglas, 1868.
- Ramsay, Allan. The Gentle Shepherd: A Pastoral Comedy, with numerous illustrations. Edinburgh: A. & C. Black, 1868. Includes print by Archibald Burns.
- Burns, Archibald. Photographic Views. n.p, [1860s]. Tourist "hinge book" containing photographs of popular Edinburgh landmarks.
