= Faithfully =

Faithfully may refer to:

- Faithfully (Faith Evans album), 2001
- Faithfully (Johnny Mathis album), 1959
- Faithfully (Jovit Baldivino album), 2010
- "Faithfully" (song), a song by Journey
- Faithfully (TV series), a 2012 Philippine drama series
- "Faithfully" (Law & Order: Criminal Intent), an episode of Law & Order: Criminal Intent

== See also ==
- Faithful (disambiguation)
