= The Faithless (Nights Like These album) =

Studio album by Nights Like These
- Released: June 13, 2006
- Genre: Deathcore
- Length: 26:35
- Label: Victory
- Producer: Andreas Magnusson

Nights Like These chronology
The Only Clown I'm Down With Is Gacy (2004)	The Faithless (2006)	Sunlight at Secondhand (2007)

Professional ratings
Review scores
Source	Rating
AllMusic	3.5/5 stars
HCS.net	3/5 stars

The Faithless is the debut full-length album by Nights Like These. It was released on June 13, 2006 by Victory Records.

== Track listing ==
1. Storming Valhalla
2. Head Of Medusa
3. Destroy The Stairs
4. Scavenger’s Daughter
5. Memento Mori
6. Ghost Town Rituals
7. Symphony For The Plague
8. Bury The Messenger
9. We Were Meant For Ruin
10. Eternal Tempest
11. Let The Waters Overtake Us

== Personnel ==
- Billy Bottom - Vocals
- Matt Qualls - Guitars
- Patrick Leatherwood - Drums
- Derren Saucer - Guitars
- Sebastian Rios - Bass
- Andreas Magnusson - Production
