= Faith (meteorite) =

Meteorite found in the United States

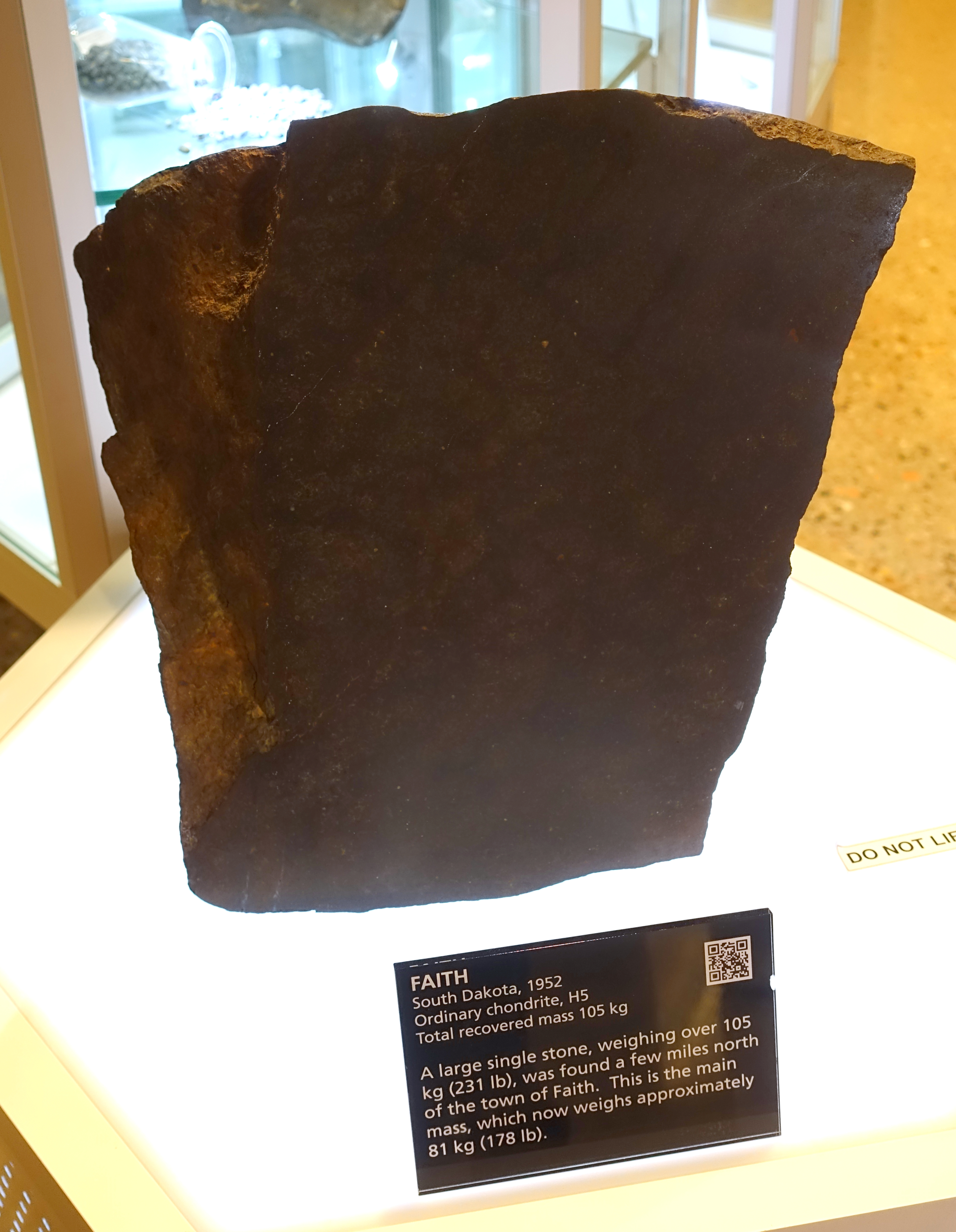
- Faith meteorite sample, exhibit at the Center for Meteorite Studies, Tempe, Arizona.
- Type: ordinary chondrite
- Class: H5
- Country: United States
- Region: South Dakota
- Coordinates: 45°20′N 102°05′W
- Observed fall: No
- Found date: 1952
- TKW: 105 kilograms (231 lb)

Faith is a chondrite meteorite that was found in 1952 in Perkins County, South Dakota, United States. It has a mass of 105 kg (231 lb).

== See also ==
- Glossary of meteoritics
