= Valentine Faithfull =

English clergyman and cricketer

The Reverend Valentine Grantham Faithfull FRSE (25 June 1820 – 30 May 1894) was an English clergyman and a first-class cricketer who played for Cambridge University in 1841. He was born at Hatfield, Hertfordshire and died at Edinburgh, Scotland.

== Life ==
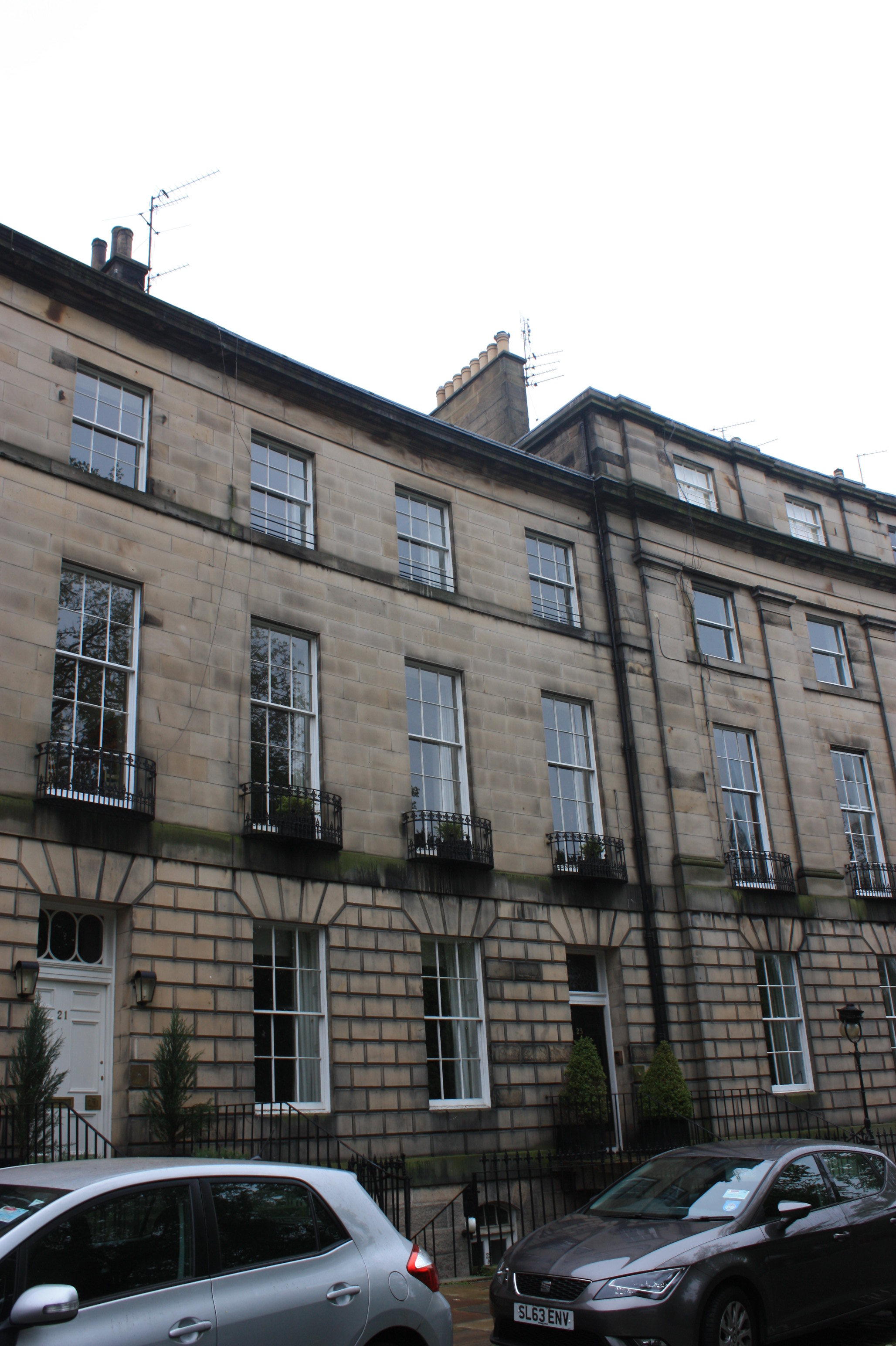
23 Royal Circus, Edinburgh

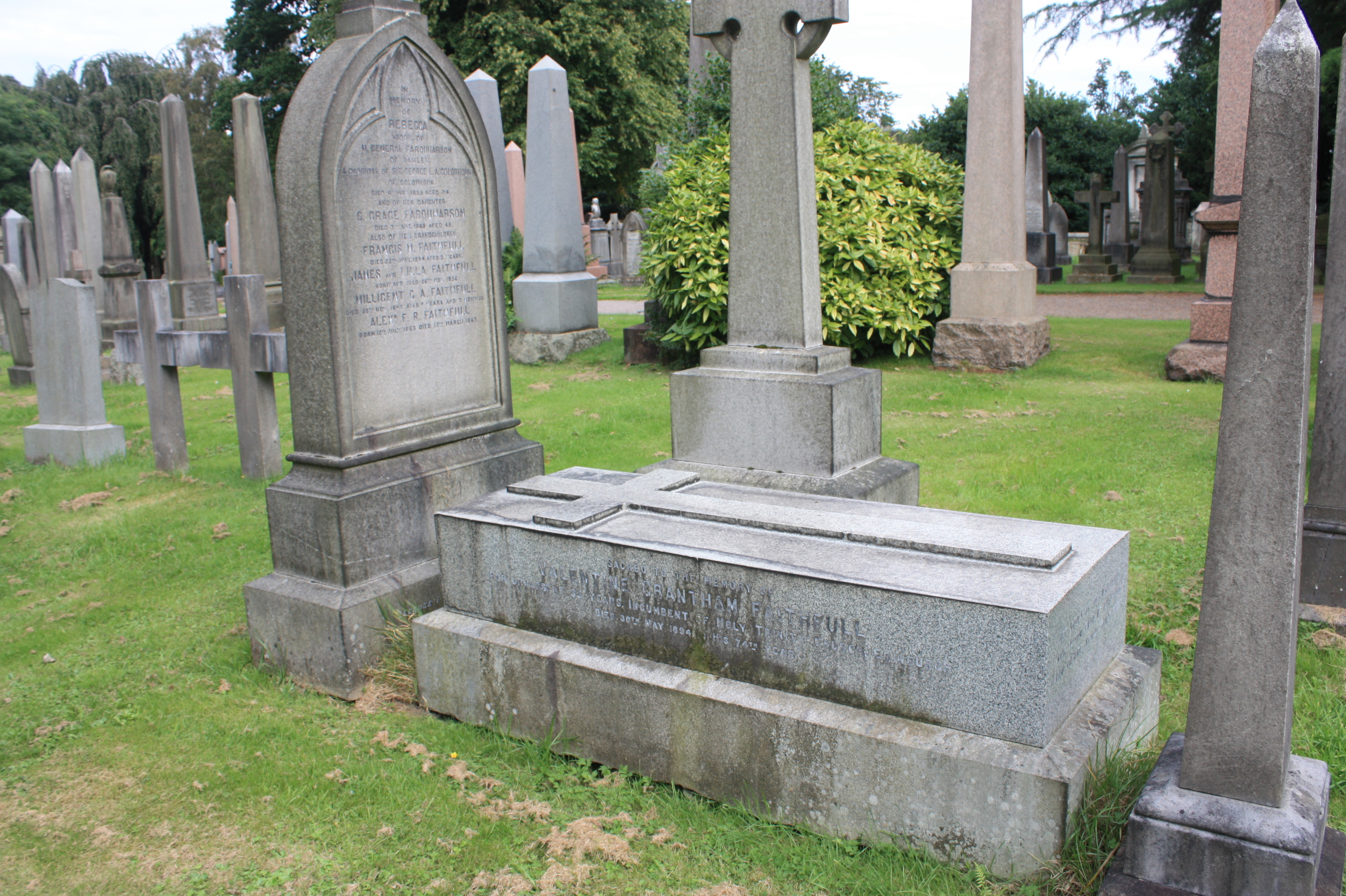
The grave of Valentine Faithfull, Dean Cemetery, Edinburgh

He was born on 25 June 1820 the son of the Reverend Francis Joseph Faithfull in Bishop's Hatfield. His older brother was James Faithfull.

Faithfull was educated at Harrow School and Corpus Christi College, Cambridge. His single game of first-class cricket came in 1841 when he scored 0 and 1 playing as a lower-order batsman for Cambridge against the Marylebone Cricket Club; the full scorecard is not available for this match, so it is not known if he bowled, and nor is his batting style known.

Faithfull was ordained as a Church of England clergyman after graduation. He served as a curate at Hatfield, where his father was rector, and then from 1848 until his death in 1894 he held posts in Edinburgh, being the incumbent at the Trinity Episcopal Church, Dean Bridge, from 1851 to 1888 under Rev David Drummond.

He was elected a Fellow of the Royal Society of Edinburgh in 1862, his proposer being the Reverend James Hodson. He resigned in 1863.

Faithfull died at home at 23 Royal Circus in Edinburgh. He is buried in Dean Cemetery on the west side of the city. The recumbent stone lies east of the large obelisk to the singer, John Wilson (at one of the path junctions).

He married Frances Maria Farquharson in August 1850, daughter of Major-General James Alexander Farquharson of Oakley, Fife, Governor of St. Lucia in the West Indies, son of John Farquharson, an officer who was one of the Farquharsons of Rochalzie otherwise Rochallie, in Perthshire. Francis Maria's mother was Rebecca, eldest daughter of Sir George Colquhoun Bart., last of the Colquhouns of Tillyquhoun (another family of Colquhoun baronets), by his wife Christian Macdonald of the Macdonalds of Rinettan.

Faithfull was a Freemason at the Lodge of Edinburgh (Mary's Chapel) No. 1.
