= Agnes Lyon =

Scottish poet

Agnes Lyon (1762–1840) was a Scottish humorous poet of the 18th and 19th century.

== Biography ==
Born in Dundee in early 1762, Lyon was the eldest daughter of Agnes (née) Hamilton and John Ramsay L'Amy of Dunkenny, Forfarshire. Her younger brother James L'Amy was an advocate and Sheriff of Forfar.

She was an accomplished verse-writer and poet filling four manuscript volumes, which she directed at her death to remain unprinted, unless her family needed financial support. Her poetry was frequently humorous, for instance, her 1821 verse Glammis Castle tells of a drunken episode involving Sir Walter Scott.

Within the towers of ancient Glammis Some merry men did dine,
And their host took care they should richly fare, In friendship, wit, and wine.
But they sat too late, and mistook the gate (For wine mounts to the brain).
Oh, 'twas merry in the hall, when the beards wagg'd all, Oh, we hope they'll be back again,
We hope they'll be back again.

The song beginning "You've surely heard of famous Niel", by which she is remembered, was written at the request of Niel Gow for his air, "Farewell to whisky". In some collections it is incorrectly printed; in Charles Rogers' Scottish Minstrel it is given from the original manuscript. It is, according to Hadden, of no great merit, and only survives because of its subject and the air to which it is set.

In 1786 she married Rev. Dr James Lyon of Glamis, Forfarshire, and died 14 September 1840.
