= Leap of faith (disambiguation) =

A "leap of faith" is the act of trusting someone or something, despite apparent counter evidence.

Leap of Faith may also refer to:

== Film, theater, and television ==
- Leap of Faith (film), a 1992 American comedy-drama film
- Leap of Faith (musical), a 2010 stage musical based on the 1992 film
- Leap of Faith (TV series), a 2002 American sitcom

=== Television episodes ===
- "Leap of Faith" (Arrow)
- "Leap of Faith" (Blue Bloods)
- "Leap of Faith" (Full House)
- "Leap of Faith" (Melrose Place 1992)
- "Leap of Faith" (My Little Pony: Friendship Is Magic)
- "Leap of Faith" (NCIS)
- "Leap of Faith" (Quantum Leap)
- "Leap of Faith" (Third Watch)
- Hollyoaks: Leap of Faith, a 2003 late-night special episode of Hollyoaks

== Literature ==
- Leap of Faith: Memoirs of an Unexpected Life, a 2003 book by Queen Noor of Jordan
- Leap of Faith, a 2000 autobiography by Gordon Cooper
- Leap of Faith, a 2000 novel by Danielle Steel

== Music ==
=== Albums ===
- Leap of Faith (Dave Douglas album) or the title song, 2000
- Leap of Faith (Kenny Loggins album) or the title song, 1991
- Leap of Faith (Shooting Star album) or the title song, 2000
- Leap of Faith, by Air Cuba, 1999
- Leap of Faith, by David Charvet, or the title song, 2002
- Leap of Faith, by Jean-Paul 'Bluey' Maunick, 2013
- Leap of Faith, by Timothy B. Schmit, 2016

=== Songs ===
- "Leap of Faith" (Hadouken! song), 2007
- "Leap of Faith" (Lionel Cartwright song), 1991
- "Leap of faith" (fripSide song)", 2022
- "Leap of Faith", by Big & Rich from Comin' to Your City, 2005
- "Leap of Faith", by Bruce Springsteen from Lucky Town, 1992
- "Leap of Faith", by Egypt Central from Egypt Central, 2005
- "Leap of Faith", by Hale from Above, Over and Beyond, 2008
- "Leap of Faith", by R. Kelly from Happy People/U Saved Me, 2004

== Other uses ==
- Leap of Faith (skate), a 14 foot, 3 inch drop at Point Loma High School, California, US
- Leap of faith, a distinctive move in the Assassin's Creed video game series
