= James Faithfull =

English cricketer (1817–1873)

Personal information
- Full name: James Grantham Faithfull
- Born: 14 June 1817; Hatfield, Hertfordshire, England
- Died: 12 March 1873 (aged 55); Marylebone, London, England
- Batting: Unknown
- Relatives: Valentine Faithfull (brother)

Domestic team information
- Years: Team
- 1839: Oxford University

Career statistics
Competition	First-class
Matches	1
Runs scored	9
Batting average	4.50
100s/50s	–/–
Top score	8
Catches/stumpings	–/–
- Source: Cricinfo, 7 March 2020

James Grantham Faithfull (14 June 1817 – 12 March 1873) was an English first-class cricketer and clergyman.

The son of The Reverend Francis Faithfull, he was born at Hatfield in June 1817. He was educated at Harrow School, before matriculating at Exeter College, Oxford in 1835, where he graduated B.A. in 1838, and M.A. in 1843. While studying at Oxford, he made a single appearance in first-class cricket for Oxford University against the Marylebone Cricket Club at Lord's in 1839. Batting twice in the match, Faithfull was dismissed for a single run in the Oxford first-innings by John Bayley, while in their second-innings he was dismissed for 8 runs by Henry Walker.

After graduating from Oxford, Faithfull took holy orders in the Church of England. His first ecclesiastical posting was chaplain to the Marquess of Salisbury in 1842. He became the vicar of North Mymms in Hertfordshire for twelve years from 1844. From 1856, he spent two years as the vicar of Clothall, Hertfordshire before holding the post of vicar of Cheshunt from 1858 to 1871. His final post was as rector of St Dunstan-in-the-East in London from 1871 until his death in March 1873. His brother, Valentine, also played first-class cricket.
