= Faithfulness =

Act of remaining true to one's life partner

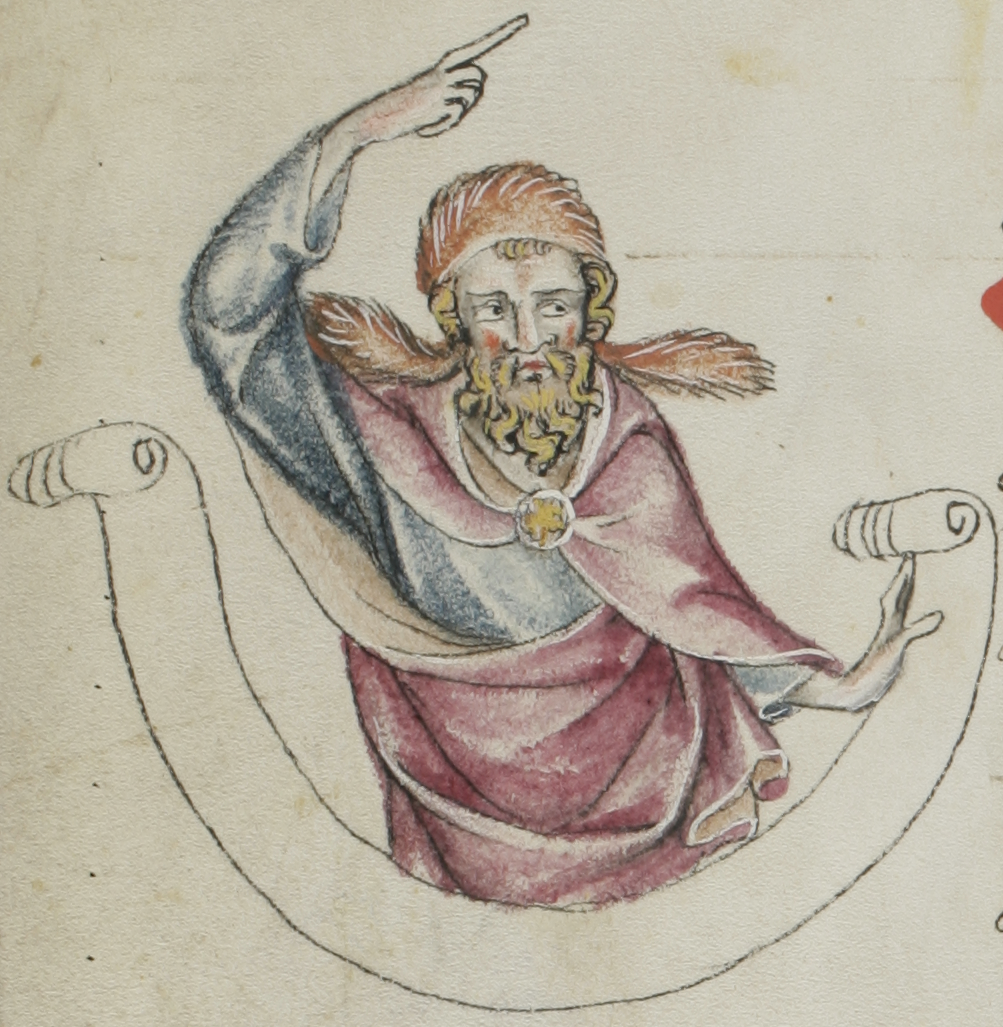
Hosea with his arm raised. Klosterneuburger Evangelienwerk, fol. 7v. c. 1340

Faithfulness means unfailingly remaining loyal to someone or something, and putting that loyalty into consistent practice regardless of extenuating circumstances. It may be exhibited, for example, by a husband or wife who does not engage in sexual relationships outside of the marriage. It can also mean keeping one's promises no matter the prevailing circumstances, such as in certain communities of monks who take a vow of silence. Literally, it is the state of being full of faith in the sense of steady devotion to a person, thing, or concept.

== Etymology ==
Its etymology is distantly related to that of fidelity; indeed, in modern electronic devices, a machine with high "fidelity" is considered "faithful" to its source material. Similarly, a spouse who, inside a sexually exclusive relationship, has sexual relations outside of marriage could be considered as being "unfaithful" and as having committed "infidelity".

== Religions ==
Sexual faithfulness within a marriage is a required tenet in Christianity—one of the four pillars of marriage. It is also required in Jewish marriage, and Islam.

== See also ==
- Fidelity – Quality of faithfulness or loyalty to another person or group
- Loyalty – Faithfulness or devotion to a person, country, group, or cause
- Marriage – Culturally recognised union between people
