= Xenotime group =

Group of minerals

The xenotime group is a grouping of mainly phosphate and vanadate minerals in the tetragonal crystal system. They are chemically related to the monoclinic monazite group.

== Xenotime group members ==
Members of the xenotime group include:

- Phosphates:
  - Xenotime
    - Xenotime-(Y): YPO_{4}
    - Xenotime-(Yb): YbPO_{4}
    - Xenotime-(Gd): GdPO_{4}
  - Pretulite: ScPO_{4}
- Arsenates:
  - Chernovite
    - Chernovite-(Y): YAsO_{4}
- Vanadates:
  - Wakefieldite
    - Wakefieldite-(Y): YVO_{4}
    - Wakefieldite-(La): LaVO_{4}
    - Wakefieldite-(Ce): CeVO_{4}
    - Wakefieldite-(Nd): NdVO_{4}
