= Yttrium arsenate =

Names
- Other names Yttrium(III) arsenate

Identifiers
CAS Number	14214-03-0; 42728-99-4 dihydrate
3D model (JSmol)	Interactive image
PubChem CID	21491032
- InChI: InChI=1S/AsH3O4.Y/c2-1(3,4)5;/h(H3,2,3,4,5);/q;+3/p-3 Key: MIQNJLWJWYSRAK-UHFFFAOYSA-K
- SMILES: [O-][As](=O)([O-])[O-].[Y+3]

Properties
Chemical formula	YAsO_{4}
Molar mass	227.83 g/mol
Appearance	Colorless crystalline solid
Solubility in water	Sparingly soluble in water

Structure
Crystal structure	Tetragonal, xenotime type
Space group	I4_{1}/amd, No. 141
Formula units (Z)	4
- Except where otherwise noted, data are given for materials in their standard state (at 25 °C [77 °F], 100 kPa). Infobox references

Yttrium arsenate is an inorganic compound of yttrium and the arsenate ion, with the formula YAsO_{4}. At ambient conditions it crystallizes in the tetragonal xenotime or zircon structure type. It is the synthetic analogue and ideal end-member composition of the mineral chernovite-(Y).

== Preparation ==
Yttrium arsenate can be prepared by precipitation from aqueous solution followed by heat treatment. In one modern synthesis, arsenic(III) oxide was oxidized with nitric acid, while yttrium oxide was dissolved separately in nitric acid; the resulting solutions were mixed and reacted at about 60 °C.

The precipitated material can be calcined between about 500 and 900 °C to obtain crystalline YAsO_{4} nanopowders.

== Properties ==
=== Crystal structure ===
At ambient pressure, YAsO_{4} crystallizes in the tetragonal crystal system, space group I4_{1}/amd (No. 141), with the zircon or xenotime structure type.

Representative lattice parameters for chernovite-(Y) and synthetic YAsO_{4} are approximately a = 7.04 Å and c = 6.27 Å, with four formula units per unit cell.

The structure consists of isolated AsO_{4}^{3−} tetrahedra and eight-coordinate Y^{3+} ions. It is closely related to the structures of xenotime-(Y), YPO_{4}, and other heavy rare-earth orthophosphates and orthoarsenates.

Natural chernovite-(Y) commonly forms extensive solid solutions with xenotime-(Y), reflecting substitution between AsO_{4}^{3−} and PO_{4}^{3−} groups.

=== High-pressure behaviour ===
Under pressure, YAsO_{4} undergoes a structural transition from the zircon-type phase to a tetragonal scheelite-type phase.

The transition begins at about 8 GPa; the zircon and scheelite phases coexist over several gigapascals, and conversion is essentially complete by about 14 GPa.

First-principles calculations predict that at still higher pressure the scheelite phase should transform to an SrUO_{4}-type structure above roughly 32 GPa, where arsenic becomes six-coordinate.

Natural chernovite-(Y) displays very similar behavior, transforming irreversibly to a scheelite-type phase near 10.5–11 GPa.

=== Optical properties ===
Pure YAsO_{4} is a wide-band-gap material. It has also been investigated as a host lattice for luminescent rare-earth ions.

Eu^{3+}-doped YAsO_{4} nanopowders show the characteristic red emission of Eu^{3+}. In samples calcined between 500 and 900 °C, crystallite sizes increased from approximately 15 to 45 nm, while the emission and excitation spectra changed with crystallite size and dopant concentration.

These properties have led to investigation of YAsO_{4}:Eu^{3+} as a nanoscale phosphor material.
