= Brockite =

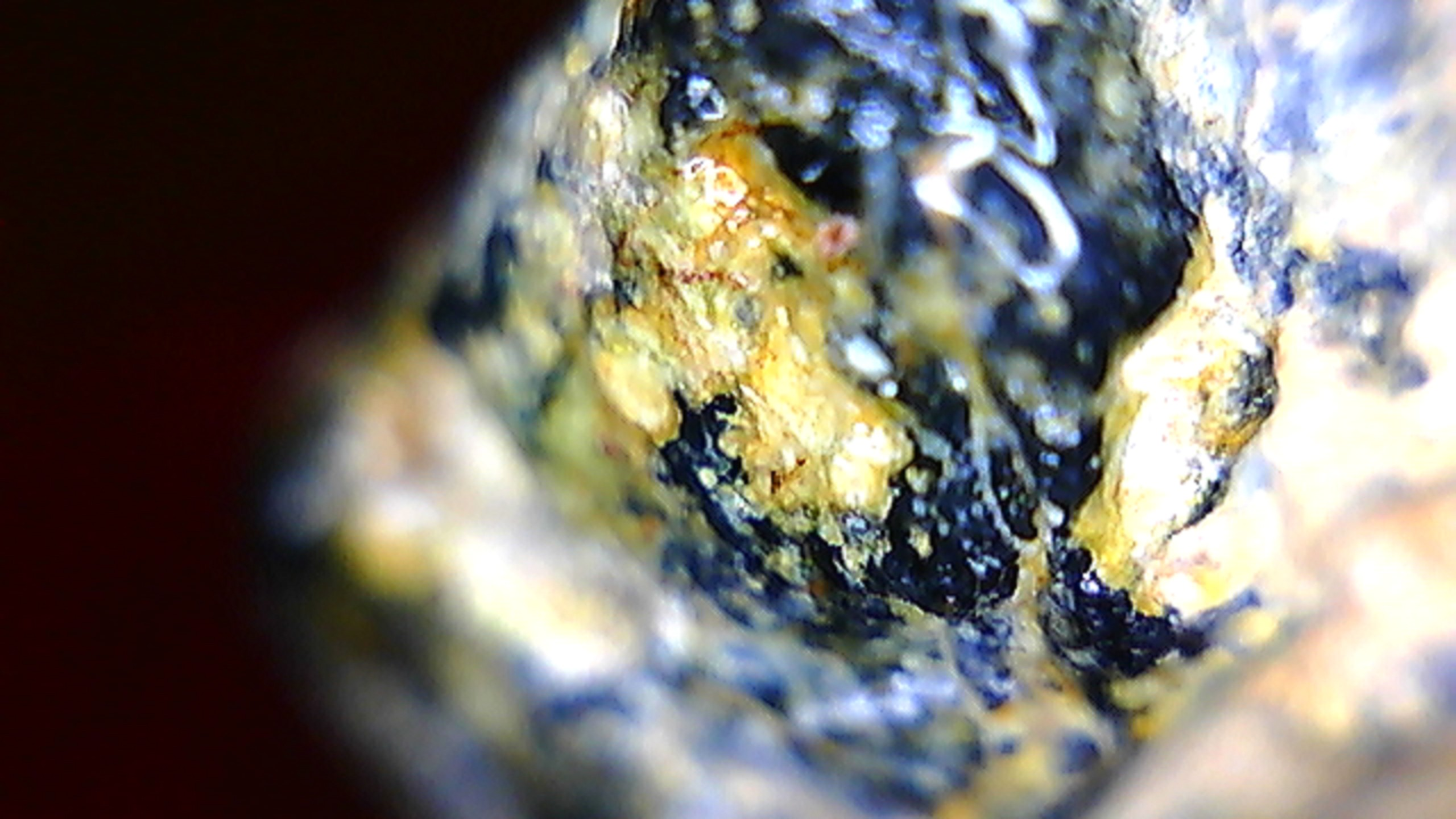
- Microphoto of brockite on thorite (black). Field view: 2 x 2 mm.

General
- Category: Phosphate mineral
- Formula: (Ca,Th,Ce)PO_{4}·H_{2}O
- IMA symbol: Bck
- Strunz classification: 8.CJ.45
- Crystal system: Hexagonal
- Crystal class: Trapezohedral (622); H-M symbol: (622)
- Space group: P6_{2}22 or P6_{4}22
- Unit cell: a = 6.98 Å, c = 6.40 Å; Z = 3

Identification
- Color: Reddish brown, yellow (red brown due to inclusions of hematite)
- Crystal habit: Rarely as Stubby hexagonal prisms rare; common as granular massive aggregates, cryptocrystalline
- Cleavage: None observed
- Fracture: Conchoidal
- Tenacity: Brittle
- Mohs scale hardness: 3 - 4
- Luster: Greasy to vitreous
- Diaphaneity: Translucent to opaque
- Specific gravity: 3.9 (measured)
- Optical properties: Uniaxial (+)
- Refractive index: n_{ω} = 1.680 n_{ε} = 1.695
- Birefringence: δ = 0.015
- Other characteristics: Radioactive

Brockite is a rare earth phosphate mineral with formula: (Ca,Th,Ce)PO_{4}·H_{2}O. It crystallizes in the hexagonal system in the chiral space group 180 or its enantiomorph 181. It is typically granular to massive with only rare occurrence of stubby crystals. It is radioactive due to the thorium content.

== Discovery and occurrence ==
Brockite was first described in 1962 for an occurrence in the Bassick Mine area, Querida, Wet Mountains, Custer County, Colorado, US. It was named for Maurice R. Brock, of the U.S. Geological Survey.

Brockite occurs in granite and granite pegmatite as an accessory mineral. Associated minerals include monazite, bastnasite, xenotime, thorite, zircon, apatite, rutile and hematite.
