= Wakefieldite-(Ce) =

Rare-earth mineral series

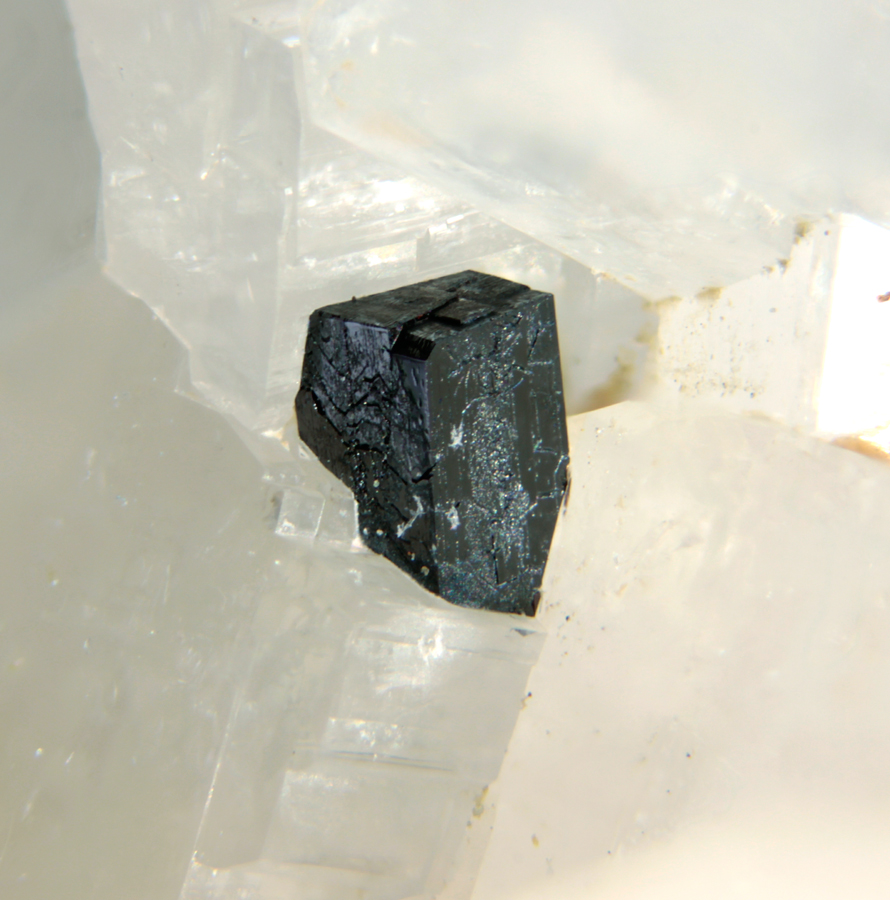

General
- Category: Rare-earth mineral
- Formula: (CeVO_{4})
- IMA symbol: Wf-Ce
- Strunz classification: 8.AD.35
- Dana classification: 38.4.11.4
- Crystal system: Tetragonal
- Crystal class: Ditetragonal dipyramidal (4/mmm); H-M symbol: (4/m 2/m 2/m)
- Space group: I4_{1}/amd

Identification
- Color: Dark red to coal-black, pale yellow to bluish gray
- Specific gravity: 4.74 (meas. Wakefieldite-(Ce))

Wakefieldite-(Ce) (CeVO_{4}) is the cerium analogue of the uncommon rare-earth element vanadate mineral Wakefieldite. It is a member of the xenotime group.

Wakefieldite-(Ce) was first described in 1977. It was initially given the name kusuïte for its type locality in the Kusu deposit, 85 km (53 mi) SW of Kinshasa, Zaire. In 1987 it was renamed as the Ce analog of wakefieldite-Y.
