= Chernovite =

Chernovite may refer to:

- Chernovite-(Y), a mineral
- Chernovite-(Ce), a mineral
- Chernovite (hacking group), credited as authors of the software toolkit Pipedream
