= Wakefieldite-(Nd) =

Mineral

General
- Category: Rare-earth mineral
- Formula: (NdVO_{4})
- IMA symbol: Wf-Nd
- Strunz classification: 8.AD.35
- Crystal system: Tetragonal
- Crystal class: Ditetragonal dipyramidal (4/mmm); H-M symbol: (4/m 2/m 2/m)
- Space group: I4_{1}/amd

Identification
- Color: Colorless or slightly reddish pink in thin section
- Diaphaneity: Transparent

Wakefieldite-(Nd) (NdVO_{4}) is the neodymium analogue of the uncommon rare-earth element vanadate mineral wakefieldite. It is a member of the xenotime group.

Wakefieldite-(Nd) was first described in 2008 at the Arase mine, Kami city, Kōchi Prefecture, Shikoku Island, Japan. and published in 2011.
