= Xenotime-(Gd) =

Mineral

General
- Category: Xenotime group
- Formula: Gd(PO_{4})
- IMA symbol: Xtm-Gd
- Strunz classification: 8.AD.35
- Crystal system: Tetragonal

Identification
- Specific gravity: 5.26 g/cm3 (calculated)

Xenotime-(Gd) is the gadolinium endpoint of Xenotime with the ideal formula Gd(PO_{4}). It is one of the few known gadolinium-dominant rare earth minerals.

== Discovery ==
Xenotime deposits rich in gadolinium were reported in 2023 from the Slovak Ore Mountains along with other rare earth minerals enriched in elements classified as medium rare earth elements (MREE). The mineral species Xenotime-(Gd) was approved by the IMA in 2023, a description of the mineral was published in 2024 based on crystals found within gadolinium rich xenotime-(Y) sampled at the Zimná Voda quartz vein near Prakovce. Besides yttrium, the examined type material bore further rare earth elements such as dysprosium, samarium and terbium.

== See also ==
- Xenotime group
