= Wakefieldite-(La) =

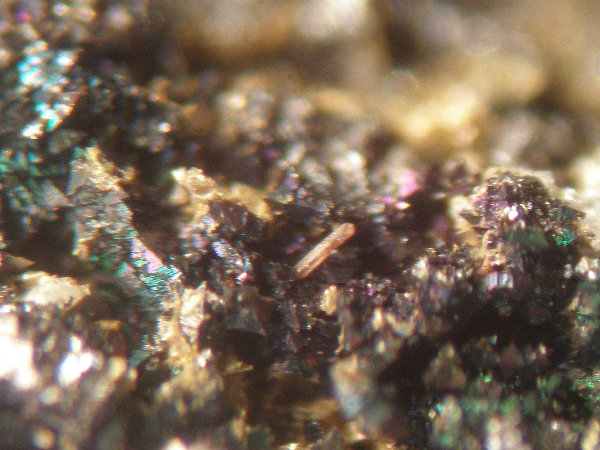
- Wakefieldite-(La) on hausmannite

General
- Category: Rare-earth mineral
- Formula: (LaVO_{4})
- IMA symbol: Wf-La
- Strunz classification: 8.AD.35
- Dana classification: 38.4.9.6
- Crystal system: Tetragonal
- Crystal class: Ditetragonal dipyramidal (4/mmm); H-M symbol: (4/m 2/m 2/m)
- Space group: I4_{1}/amd

Identification
- Color: Light pink, brown
- Crystal habit: Prismatic crystals
- Cleavage: None Observed, possible {100}
- Fracture: Irregular
- Tenacity: brittle
- Mohs scale hardness: 4
- Luster: Adamantine
- Streak: white
- Diaphaneity: Transparent, Translucent
- Specific gravity: 4.703 (calculated)
- Optical properties: Uniaxial (+)

Wakefieldite-(La) is the lanthanum endpoint of Wakefieldite with the ideal formula LaVO_{4}. As a vanadate in the tetragonal crystal system, the rare-earth mineral is a member of the xenotime group.

Wakefieldite-(La) was first described in 2008 for an occurrence in the Glücksstern mine, Gottlob Hill, Friedrichroda, Thuringia, Germany. Similar to other rare-earth minerals, the type material contained considerable parts of other rare earth elements, namely neodymium, praseodymium, samarium and yttrium.
