= Monazite geochronology =

Geological dating technique

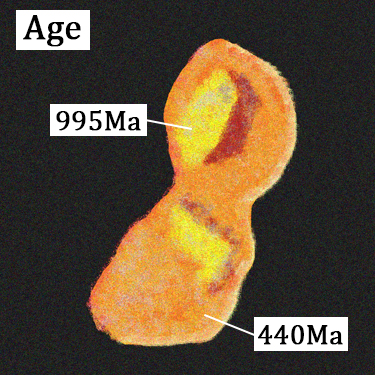
Illustration showing age map and zonation pattern of a monazite grain. Brighter colour represents older age. Edited after Williams, 1999.

Monazite geochronology is a dating technique to study geological history using the mineral monazite. It is a powerful tool in studying the complex history of metamorphic rocks particularly, as well as igneous, sedimentary and hydrothermal rocks. The dating uses the radioactive processes in monazite as a clock.

The uniqueness of monazite geochronology comes from the high thermal resistance of monazite, which allows age information to be retained during the geological history. As monazite grows, it forms successive generations of different compositions and ages, commonly without erasing the previous ones, forming zonation patterns in monazite. Because of the age zonation, dating should be done on individual zones, rather than the whole crystal. Also, textures of monazite crystals may represent certain type of events. Therefore, direct sampling techniques with high spatial resolution are required, in order to study these tiny zones individually, without damaging the textures and zonations.

The advantage of monazite geochronology is the ability to relate monazite compositions with geological processes. Finding the ages of compositional zones can mean finding the ages of geological processes.

== Decay of U and Th to Pb ==
Monazite is a rare-earth-element phosphate mineral, with the chemical formula e.g. (Ce, La, Nd, Th, Y)PO_{4}. It appears in a small amount as an accessory mineral in many igneous, metamorphic and sedimentary rocks. Monazite minerals contain significant amounts of radioactive elements Th and U, which trigger radioactive processes. These two elements are what make this mineral suitable for radiometric dating.

In the radioactive processes, the three unstable parent isotopes decay into their respective stable daughter isotopes of Pb. Each following a decay chain consisting of alpha and beta decays, parent isotopes ^{238}U, ^{235}U and ^{232}Th, decay into a series of intermediate daughter isotopes, and finally lead to stable isotopes, ^{206}Pb, ^{207}Pb and ^{208}Pb, respectively. Each decay chain has a unique half-life, which means the daughter isotopes are generated at different rates.

The decay processes can be simplified as the following equations, which omit all the intermediate daughter isotopes.

$^{238}U\rightarrow^{206}Pb+8\alpha+6\beta^-+Energy \quad \lambda_{238}=1.55125{e}^{-10} yr^{-1} \quad t_{1/2} = 4.4683 x 10^9 yr$

$^{235}U\rightarrow^{207}Pb+7\alpha+4\beta^-+Energy \quad \lambda_{235}=9.8485{e}^{-10} yr^{-1} \quad t_{1/2} = 7.0310 x 10^8 yr$

$^{232}Th\rightarrow^{208}Pb+6\alpha+4\beta^-+Energy \quad \lambda_{232}=4.9475{e}^{-11} yr^{-1} \quad t_{1/2} = 1.4010x10^{10} yr$

where α represents alpha particle, β^{−} represents beta particle, λ represents decay constant and t_{1/2} represents half-life.

Monazite geochronology studies the ratio of parent isotopes to daughter isotopes (isotopic ratio), and calculates how much time has passed since daughter isotopes start accumulating.

== Radiometric age and geological age ==
Radiometric age represents the time when the decay process starts. Geological age represents the time when a geological event occurs. Manipulating the isotopic ratios can only give us radiometric age. To obtain the geological age, we need to know the relationship between the two. In other words, how do geological events affect the radioactive system in monazite? Actually, the radioactive system is like a digital 'clock', while the geological processes can be like replacing a battery. When a new battery is inserted, this 'clock' starts counting from 00:00. This process is what we call the age resetting mechanism. In monazite, the age resetting is caused by the loss of Pb. Pb is produced continuously by the decays of U and Th since the radioactive system (clock) starts running. The more Pb (or less U and Th) the system contains means the longer period has been passed. If all Pb are suddenly removed from monazite by a geological event (replacing battery), the age become zero (00:00) again. Before thinking what exact geological events trigger Pb loss (see section: Interpretation and application), it is important to know the two mechanisms causing Pb loss in monazite.

== Mechanisms of Pb loss ==
=== Solid-state diffusion ===
Closure temperature for U-Pb dating
Mineral	T_{c} for U-Pb dating (°C)
Titanite	600–650
Rutile	400–450
Apatite	450–500
Zircon	>1000
Monazite	>1000

Solid-state diffusion is the net movement of atoms in solid phase, from a region of higher concentration to one of lower concentration. It is easy to imagine diffusion in a liquid phase as ink spreading in water. Solid-state diffusion of Pb is the net exchange of Pb in the solid mineral with the external environment, which is usually a fluid. In most of the cases, Pb is transported from the mineral to the fluid, resulting in Pb loss and thus age resetting.

The rate of diffusion increases with temperature as atoms are moving faster. However, as the mineral cools and the crystal structure becomes more complete, the diffusions of parent and daughter isotopes slow down and finally become insignificant at a certain temperature. This closure temperature (T_{c}) depends on the crystal size, shape, cooling rate and diffusion coefficient, which in turn varies for each mineral and radioactive systems. That is, above T_{c,} Pb is continuously lost and the radioactive clock is keeping zero. Once the temperature falls below T_{c}, the system is closed and the clock starts counting.

Monazite is characterized by its high Pb retention ability even at high temperatures for a prolonged period. The closure temperature of monazite in U-Th-Pb system is higher than 800 °C, much higher than the other common minerals.

=== Fluid-assisted dissolution-precipitation ===
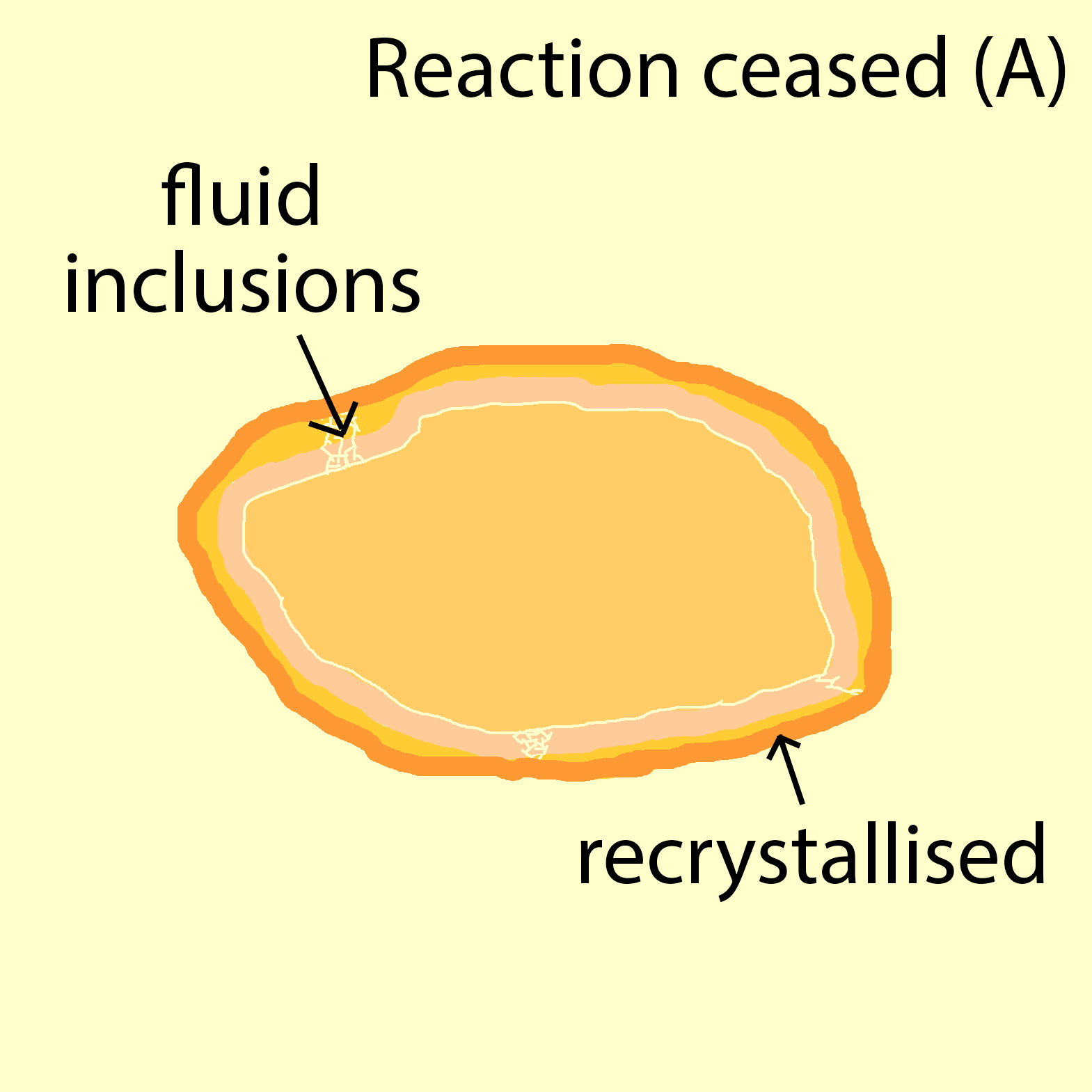
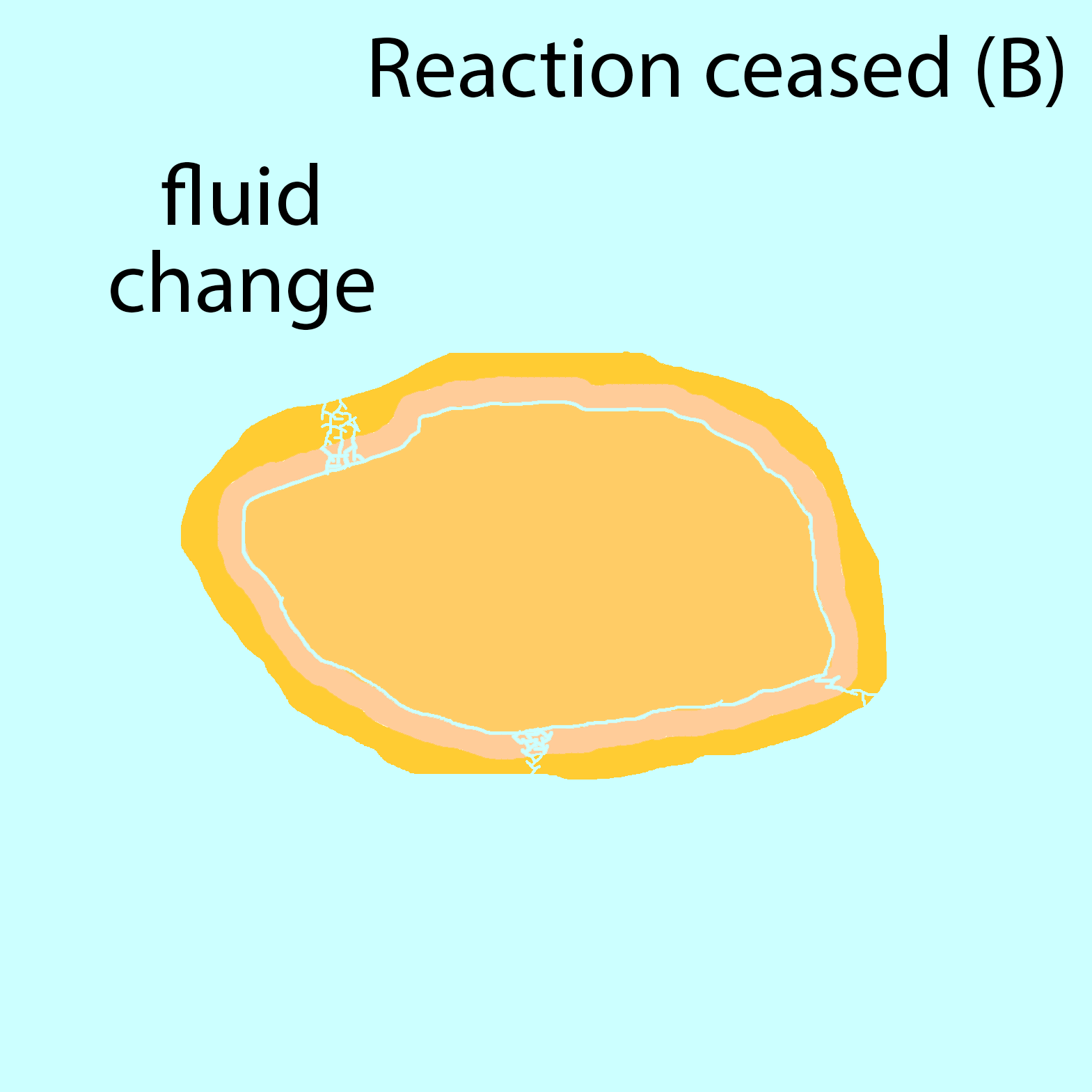
Successive growth of monazite grain by fluid-assisted dissolution-precipitation. (1) Monazite (orange) dissolves along reaction front the contact with the fluid (yellow) (2) Monazite reprecipitates as an altered monazite with a new chemical composition (pink) (3) Reaction continues with fluid being transported to the reaction front by infiltration paths. (A) Reaction ceased due to recrystallisation of precipitating phase (dark orange). (B) Reaction ceased due to change in reaction system (blue).

Unlike solid-state diffusion, fluid-assisted dissolution-precipitation occurs below T_{c}. Interaction between the mineral phase and a coexisting fluid phase during geological events directly contributes to this process. It is a chemical reaction driven by the system stabilization from minimizing Gibbs free energy. A reactive fluid is present as a catalyst and a source of reactants for the reaction.

If a geological process creates a suitable fluid and temperature, monazite dissolves along the contact with the fluid (reaction front), and reprecipitates as an altered monazite with a new chemical composition. The rates of the dissolution and reprecipitation are the same, so that the original mineral phase is always in contact with the precipitating phase, separated by only a thin layer of fluid as a reaction medium. Once the reaction is activated, it is self-continuing. The reaction front migrates towards the centre of the parent monazite, leaving behind the newly formed monazite, forming a core-rim structure.

The composition of the precipitating phase depends on the fluid composition and temperature. During most of the reactions, Pb is efficiently removed and the precipitating phase is Pb-free. Therefore, the age of the newly formed rim is reset, representing the time of this alternation.

There are basically two factors which can cause the reaction to cease. (A) Reaction ceases due to the recrystallisation of precipitating phase, removing all the fluid infiltration paths. This results in fluid inclusions in monazite. (B) Reaction ceases due to a change in the system such as the composition of fluid and monazite, making this reaction no longer reactive.

=== Implications for monazite geochronology ===
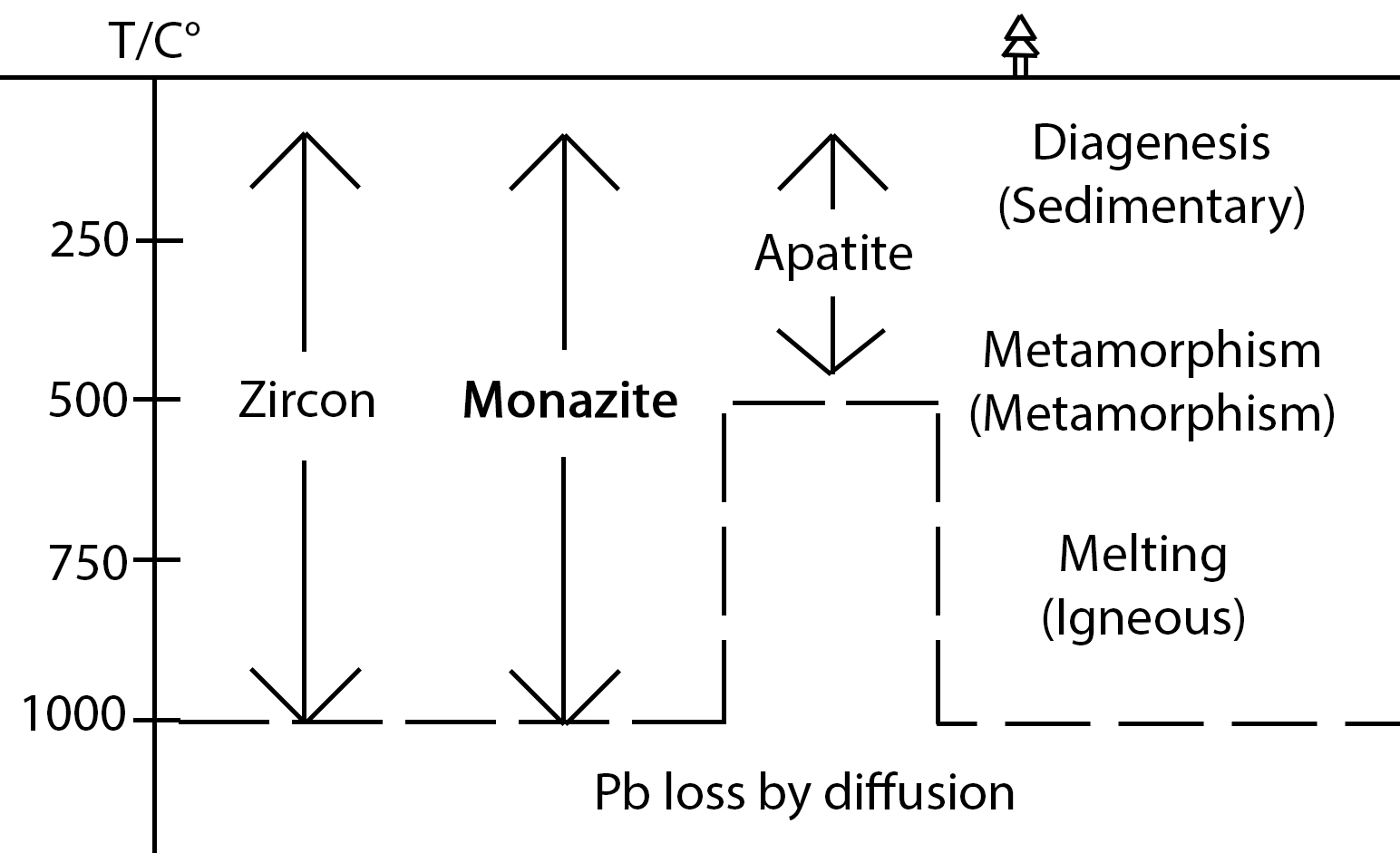
Range of geological processes at different temperature recorded by monazite, zircon and apatite in U-Pb dating

Since the diffusion of reactants between the dissolving phase and the precipitating phase is slow, the fluid is essential for providing easy transport for the reactants. Yet as the reaction proceeds, the dissolving phase and the fluid are separated by the solid precipitating phase, blocking the transport of reactants. Therefore, there must be some interconnected porosity in the precipitating phase, which allows the fluid to infiltrate and fuel the reaction front.

Most other geochronometers usually have a much lower closure temperature. Once they are subjected to a temperature higher than T_{c}, all age information will be reset, losing information from past geological events. In contrast, since monazite has a high T_{c}, even though it may experience younger high-grade metamorphism with high temperatures, it is likely that the previous geological history will be preserved. Furthermore, dissolution-precipitation is usually triggered by geological events such as metamorphism, deformation and hydrothermal alternation below T_{c}. Each of these events writes new age information by precipitating a new domain without erasing the older information. Therefore, it is likely that monazite preserves a complete history of generations.

Monazite and zircon are two minerals that are commonly employed in geochronology to study geological history. They both exhibit high closure temperatures which makes them suitable for recording igneous and metamorphic events. However, they behave differently throughout their geological history. Generally, monazite performs better in recording metamorphism (recrystallisation ages) with different zonation patterns in ages and composition. Zircon is not as reactive as monazite during metamorphic reactions and is better for recording igneous events (cooling ages). Moreover, monazite is more suitable in dating relatively low-temperature metamorphism for example amphibolite-facies than zircon.

== Monazite zonation ==
Zonation is a characteristic of monazite. A single monazite grain can contain domains of distinctively different compositions and ages. These domains are widely accepted to represent episodes in geological history with monazite growth or recrystallisation. The key to monazite geochronology is to find out what geological events or environments a domain represents, by comparing its chemical composition with mineral stability and reactions. The age of the event is thus represented by the domain age.

The ideal formula of monazite is [LREE(PO_{4})], the variation in composition is mainly due to the chemical substitutions of light rare earth elements (REE) in monazite by other elements. One of the common substitutions are the exchange between LREE with Th and Ca, and P with Si to form huttonite [Th(SiO_{4})] and brabantite [CaTh(PO_{4})_{2}]. Since all three minerals share the same chemical structure, they are the three endmembers in their solid solution, meaning that they appear in a same solid phase where substitutions happen. The compositional zonation patterns may not be the same when we are considering different elements, and age zonation may have no relationship with compositional zonation at all. (see images from the section: analysis procedures) Thus, one needs to be very careful in linking among zonations. In natural monazite, the zonation pattern maybe complex and hard to interpret. Below we describe some simple chemical zonation patterns and the associated interpretations. Zonation patterns associated with igneous activity are usually easy to interpret. However, those associated with metamorphism are more complicated.

=== Concentric zoning ===
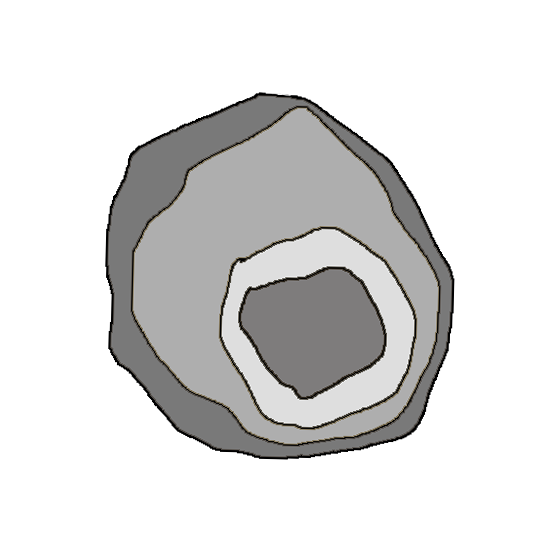
Concentric zoning: monazite grows with new successive layers with different compositions

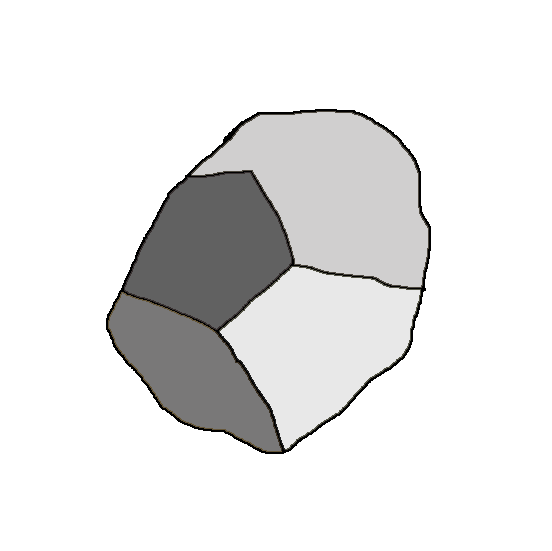
Sector zoning: different elements crystallised preferentially at different faces of the crystal

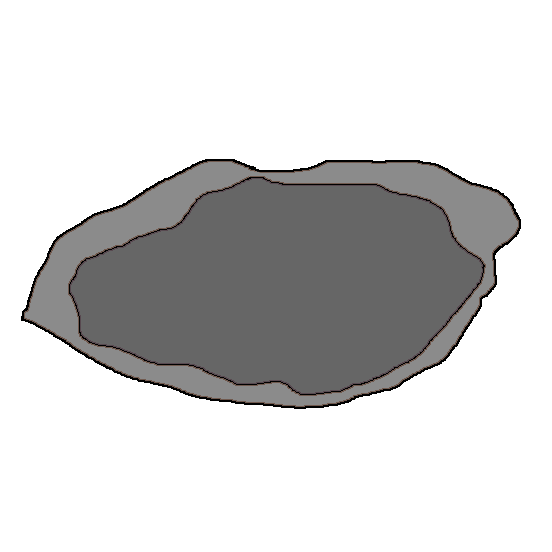
Core-rim zoning: altered rim formed surrounding the original core under a dissolution-precipitation reaction

Zoning patterns of monazite. Intensity of colour represents the concentration of a certain element. Edited after Williams, 2007

One mode of monazite formation is crystallization from an igneous melt. The concentric zoning pattern reflects the changing composition of the melt which affects the composition of the crystallizing monazite.

=== Sector zoning ===
Sector zoning is also associated with the crystallization of monazite in a melt. However, some elements may have a tendency to crystallize onto a specific crystal face. This results in uneven growth and composition.

=== Core-rim zoning ===
Core-rim zoning is usually associated with the fluid-assisted dissolution-precipitation in metamorphic reactions, forming successive rims each with a new composition. The fluid composition and metamorphic grade (H/T) are important factors in the rim composition.

=== Other zoning patterns ===
Mottled and patchy zoning patterns are more complex zonations. The interpretations are usually not simple.

== Dating approaches ==
Isotopic dating and chemical dating are the two typical methods used in monazite geochronology. Both methods make use of the radioactive nature of Th and U in monazite.

=== Isotopic dating ===
Isotopic dating requires measuring the isotopic concentration of radioactive U and Th, and radiogenic Pb in monazite. By treating each decay chain in the U-Th-Pb system independently, three classic isochron equations can be obtained:

$\left ( \frac{^{206}Pb}{^{204}Pb} \right )=\left ( \frac{^{206}Pb}{^{204}Pb} \right )_0+\left ( \frac{^{238}U}{^{204}Pb} \right )\bigl(e^{\lambda_{238}t}-1\bigr)$

$\left ( \frac{^{207}Pb}{^{204}Pb} \right )=\left ( \frac{^{207}Pb}{^{204}Pb} \right )_0+\left ( \frac{^{235}U}{^{204}Pb} \right )\bigl(e^{\lambda_{235}t}-1\bigr)$

$\left ( \frac{^{208}Pb}{^{204}Pb} \right )=\left ( \frac{^{208}Pb}{^{204}Pb} \right )_0+\left ( \frac{^{232}Th}{^{204}Pb} \right )\bigl(e^{\lambda_{232}t}-1\bigr)$

where $\bigl( \quad \bigr)_0$ represents the initial isotopic ratio when the system resets, t represents the time after the system reset, and λ^{238}, λ^{235} and λ^{232} are the decay constants of ^{238}U, ^{235}U and ^{232}Th respectively.

Combinations of the use of the above equations, such as U-Th-Pb dating, U-Pb dating and Pb-Pb dating, require different levels of analysis techniques and offer variable levels of precision and accuracy. The general uncertainty in the ages measured is 2σ (e.g.).

=== Chemical dating/ Total Pb dating ===
Chemical dating requires measuring the elemental abundances of U, Th and Pb but not isotopes. U-Th-total Pb dating, also known as electron microprobe U–Th–Pb dating, measures the elemental abundances of the three elements by an electron microprobe, and calculates the age (t) by the below equation.
$$Pb = \frac{Th}{232}[\exp(\lambda^{232}t)-1]208+\frac{U}{238.04}0.9928\times[\exp(\lambda^{238}t)-1]206+
\frac{U}{235}0.0072\times[\exp(\lambda^{235}t)-1]207$$
where Pb, Th and U are concentrations in parts-per-million, and λ^{232}, λ^{235} and λ^{238} are the decay constants of ^{232}Th, ^{235}U and ^{238}U respectively.

For chemical dating results to be valid, the following assumptions are required:

1. Non-radiogenic Pb is negligible compared to radiogenic Pb.
2. No modification of U/Th/Pb has occurred except radioactivity.

The first assumption tends to be true since monazite is very unlikely to incorporate Pb during its growth. The non-radiogenic Pb content in many laboratory tests was found to be very low, nearly always less than 1 ppm. The most common error arising from this assumption is contamination with lead during sample preparation. The second assumption is usually justified by the concordant behavior of the mineral observed in tests. That means the system is either reset totally or unaffected totally by geological processes, there is no partial resetting of the system. Minor errors may arise due to negligible disturbance during mass transfer.

The theory is that monazite has high contents of Th (generally 3–15% and up to 25% of its weight) and U (generally hundreds of ppm and up to 5% in concentration). Thus, Pb accumulates at a high rate by radioactive processes. In less than hundreds of years, it reaches a level high enough to be measured accurately by an electron microprobe.

== Analysis techniques ==
Age and compositional zonation as well as the texture of monazite provide evidence on the successive growth of the crystal during discrete geological events. The scope of information that can be obtained largely depends on the analysis techniques employed in geochronology.

=== Comparison between conventional and in situ analysis ===
Conventional analysis

Conventionally, monazite is separated from samples by dissolution and chemical methods. Single or fractions of crystals are selected for dating, usually by thermal ionization mass spectrometry (TIMS). That means one age is generated for a single monazite crystal or for a group of crystals. The age information obtained is obviously inconsistent and inaccurate, because even a single monazite crystal contains zones of different ages. Also, mechanical separation for monazite often destroys the associated textural and spatial information in the monazite crystals, which is crucial in interpreting relationships between domains and geological environments.

In-situ analysis

	Conventional analysis	In-situ analysis
Sampling	Physical/chemical separation	Direct sampling
Dating target	Single/ fractions of grains	Age domains
Dated age	Inconsistent	Consistent
Texture preserved?	No	Yes

For the above reasons, the demand for in-situ analysis is increasing. In-situ means analyzing monazite grains in their original host rocks without separation (refer to in situ) such that the texture and zonation pattern are kept intact in order to reveal a more comprehensive geological history of the host rock. Direct sampling techniques, high spatial resolution and precision are required for in-situ analysis. With technological advancement, more and more measurement tools such as laser ablation inductively coupled plasma mass spectrometry (LA-ICPMS) and laser microprobe mass spectrometer (LMMS) are capable of such analysis.

=== Analysis procedures ===
Shown below is a general procedure for monazite dating. The characteristics and procedures are different for each measurement tool, especially sample preparation and dating methods. Details of some common measurement tools are described in the section: Measurement tools.

1. Sample preparation
2. Monazite identification and mapping
3. Monazite compositional mapping
4. Monazite age mapping
5. Quantitative dating

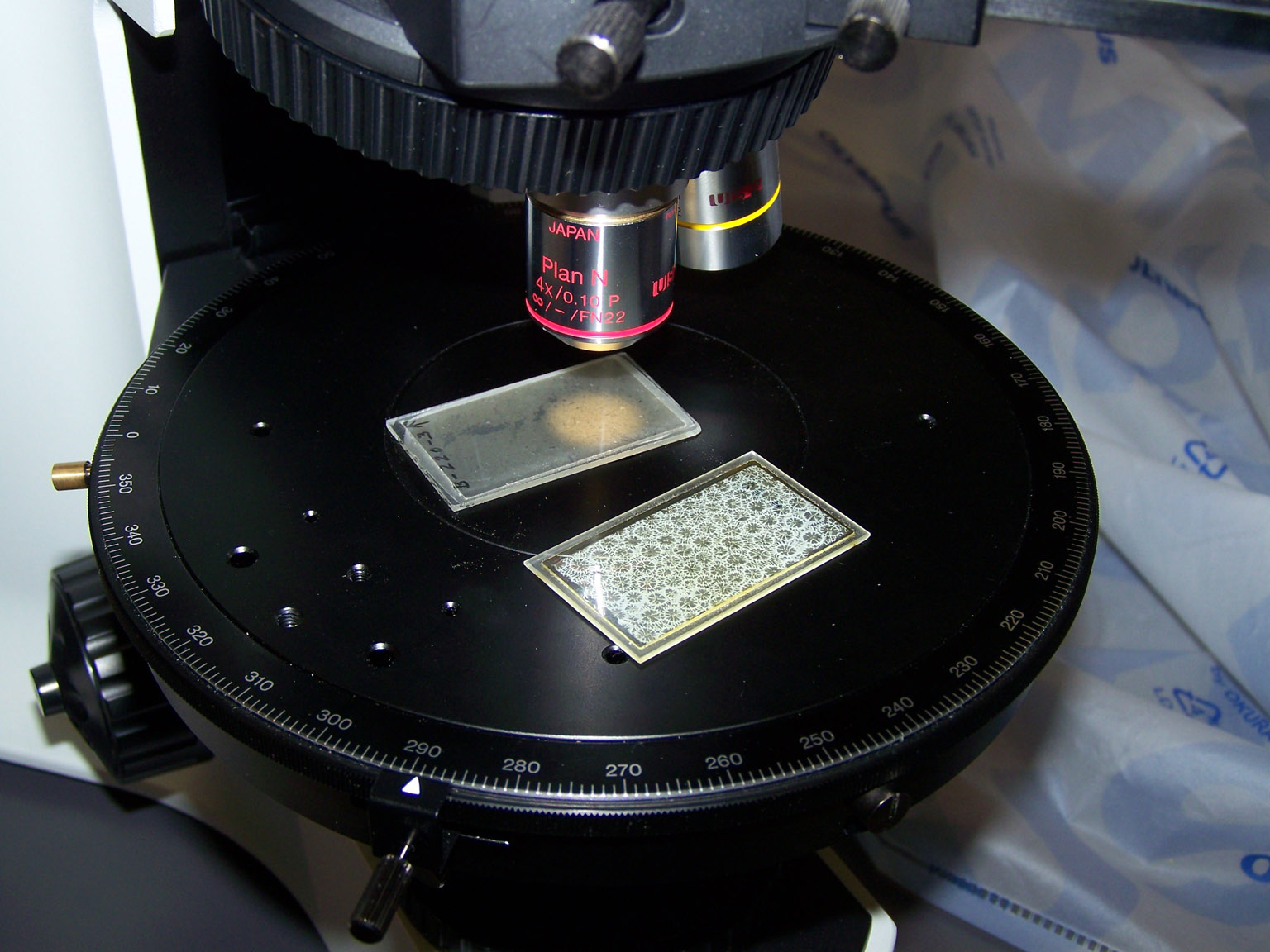
Sample preparation: Thin sections of limestone rocks

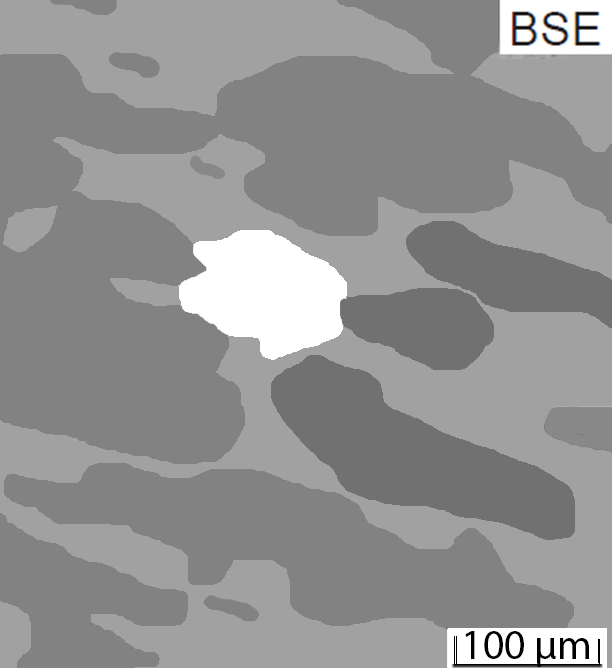
Monazite identification: Illustration showing a backscattered electron image of a rock sample with monazite (at the center with white color). Edited after Williams, 1999.

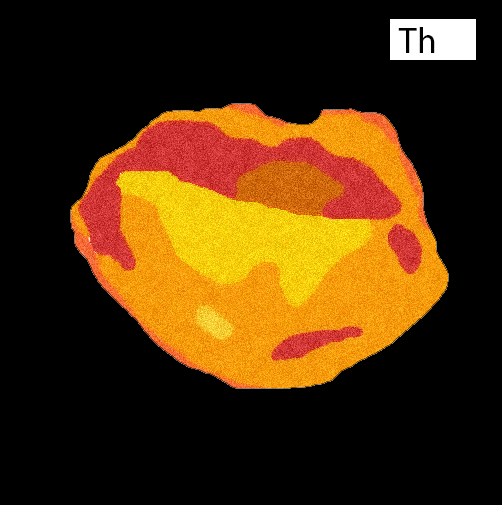
Compositional mapping: Illustration showing X-ray Th composition map of a monazite grain. Brighter color represents higher concentration. Edited after Williams, 1999.

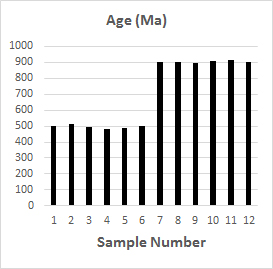
Quantitative dating: Histogram of ages measured, showing two age zonations in monazite. Edited after Williams, 1999.

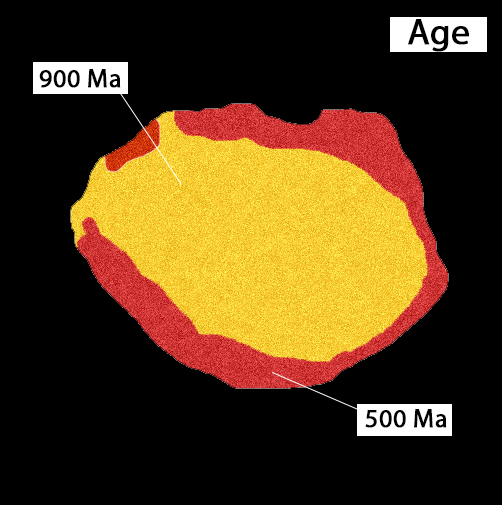
Illustration of an age map of a monazite grain. Brighter color corresponds to older age. Edited after Williams, 1999.

==== Sample preparation ====
In both conventional and in-situ dating, a thin section of the rock of interest is prepared. First, a thin layer of rock is cut by a diamond saw and ground to become optically flat. Then, it is mounted on a slide made of glass or resin, and ground smooth using abrasive grit. The final sample is usually only 30 μm thick.

==== Monazite identification and mapping ====
Monazite grains are identified by a backscattered electron imaging survey or/and electron microprobe analysis (EMPA) by mapping the concentration of distinctive Ce in monazite. The two images are usually superimposed to reflect sample texture and monazite locations at the same time.

==== Monazite compositional mapping ====
Monazite grains which show useful relationships with microtextures or host minerals are selected for compositional mapping. Major elemental and sometimes trace elemental maps are created at high magnification by electron microprobe X-ray mapping to show compositional zonation patterns. Maps of elemental Y, Th, Pb, U have proven useful in identifying compositional domains in monazite.

==== Monazite age mapping ====
Estimated ages are calculated across the compositional map by analysing the concentration of Th, Pb and U by the total-Pb dating method. The result is then used to generate an age map which approximately identifies all the age domains.

==== Quantitative dating ====
A number of spots within an age domain are selected and further dated accurately with the measurement tools by isotopic dating method. The results are then analysed statistically to give an accurate age of each age domain.

== Measurement techniques ==
The choice of various conventional or in-situ analysis techniques affects the resolution, precision, detection limits and cost of monazite geochronology. The recent analytical progress in U-Th-Pb system in natural monazite has been mainly achieved by (1) Isotope Dilution Thermal Ionization Mass Spectrometry (ID-TIMS), (2) Secondary Ion Mass Spectrometry (SIMS), (3) Laser Ablation Inductively Coupled Plasma Mass Spectrometry (LA-ICP-MS) and (4) Electronic Microprobe Analyses (EMPA).

=== Conventional analysis ===
==== Isotope dilution thermal ionization mass spectrometry ====
In the 1950s, Alfred Nier developed the technique of ID-TIMS, which later become the first tool used in monazite geochronology. Since this method involves the chemical separation of monazite (isotope dilution), it is regarded as a conventional analysis technique. Generally, it takes several hours for a U-Pb measurement. The precision of date is nearly 0.1%, provided that the ages are concordant (i.e. not dates reflecting mixing of zonations). It is regarded as the most precise method in monazite geochronology.

Monazite mineral grains are carefully hand-picked for dating. They are spiked with a tracer solution and dissolved in HF or HCl. Using ion exchange chemistry, U, Th and Pb are separated from other elements. The purposes of the separation are (1) potential isobaric interference should be removed before analysis because of the high-sensitivity and low-mass resolution nature of TIMS; (2) ionization of the elements of interest maybe impeded by other elements, which results in reduced signal size and precision.

The separated U, Th and Pb samples are put carefully onto a metal filament, which is usually made from Re. The elements are heated and ionize to their respective ions, which are accelerated under a strong magnetic field and are measured by a detector.

The tracer solution is a solution with a known amount of U and Pb tracer isotopes. Due to elemental fractionation, both elements cannot be measured simultaneously by TIMS. The tracer solution is therefore used to measure ratios of sample isotope to tracer isotopes. The ratios are converted to moles of sample isotopes for dating.

=== In-situ analysis ===
The following measurement techniques apply to in-situ analysis, which involves direct sampling of monazite grains using an incident ion beam or a laser.

==== Secondary ion mass spectrometry (SIMS) ====
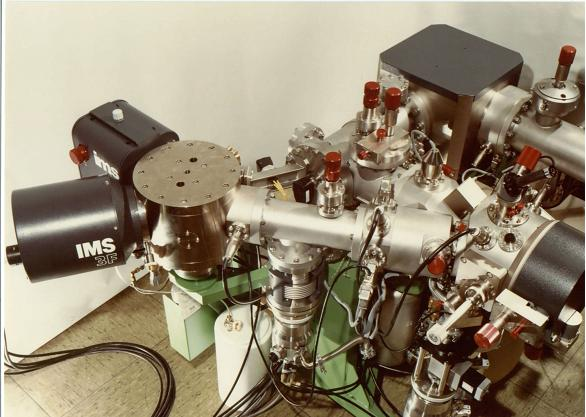
Old magnetic sector SIMS by the manufacturer CAMECA

SIMS is a mass spectrometry method to measure small-scale elemental and isotopic variations of samples. Its ability to measure in spots with a narrow diameter (10–40 μm) makes it a useful tool to date small (<100 μm) mineral grains and individual domains within a single crystal. SIMS can achieve a precision of ~3%. Sensitive high-resolution ion microprobe (SHRIMP) is widely regarded as a powerful tool among SIMS.

SIMS analyzes the mineral surface (a few μm) composition by sputtering the surface with a focused primary ion beam under vacuum. The secondary ions liberated from the mineral are accelerated, measured and analyzed in the mass spectrometer. Sample are analysed in rotation with a standard of known elemental or isotopic ratios in order to determine the ratios in the sample for dating.

==== Laser ablation inductively coupled plasma mass spectrometry (LA-ICPMS) ====
The application of LA-ICPMS in U-Pb geochronology started in the 1990s. Since it enables relatively short and cheap yet high-spatial-resolution analysis, it has become the most utilized method of monazite geochronology. The precision of LA-ICPMS is limited by standard variability, which is about 2% of a given age.

The mineral sample surface is sputtered by a laser inside a sample cell. The ablated particles are collected and incorporated into a carrier gas. The resulting aerosols are analyzed by a mass spectrometer for dating. A solid-state or gas-source laser with a short wavelength is commonly used as the laser ablation system in geochronology.

==== Electronic microprobe analyses (EMPA) ====
EMPA is employed in monazite geochronology especially for in-situ chemical dating (total-Pb dating). The high content of U, Th and Pb in monazite match with the requirement arising from the relatively higher lower detection limit. Therefore, EMPA is a high-resolution (approximately 1 μm), rapid and inexpensive method in chemical dating to resolve growth histories of monazite. It can achieve a precision of 5–10 myr in Pb-rich monazite, and 10–20 myr in Pb-poor monazite.

== Interpretation and application ==
Monazite geochronology can reveal complex geological history recorded in the monazite mineral grains. The characteristic composition and age of each domain or zone represent a past geological event with a certain age. The key challenge in monazite geochronology is to correctly relate textures and compositions in each domain to the associated geological events which formed them.

Even a single monazite grain may reveal a complex history, in which geologic events maybe inter-related or coeval, making discrimination difficult. The section below aims to briefly explain how composition and age data are interpreted to link different types of events.

=== Crystallisation of melt ===
Understanding the igneous petrology of monazite is important to be able to date the crystallisation age of igneous rocks. Monazite is commonly present as an accessory mineral in low-CaO peraluminous granitoids, from diorites, micaceous granites to pegmatites. The reason for the low CaO content is probably that melts with high CaO content promote the formation of apatite and allanite but not monazite. It is commonly formed from magmatism involving carbonatic melts but not mafic plutons or lavas. Those rocks usually host economic REE ore deposits, making monazite geochronology important in mining exploration.

The simplest monazite zonation showing successive crystallisation of melts is concentric zonation, in which new monazite layers are crystallized rim-by-rim around the pre-existing core. The rims often show compositional variations due to the preferential incorporation of certain elements in the crystal lattice. For example, considering a closed system, Th is preferentially incorporated into the monazite mineral structure, leaving a Th-depleted melt. Therefore, older monazite near the core of a grain is rich in Th while younger monazite contains less, resulting in a rimward decrease of Th in a concentric zoning pattern. Investigating composition and age variation of these rims help to constrain the timing and rate of crystallisation as well as the composition of the melt, especially for rocks where zircon is not present.

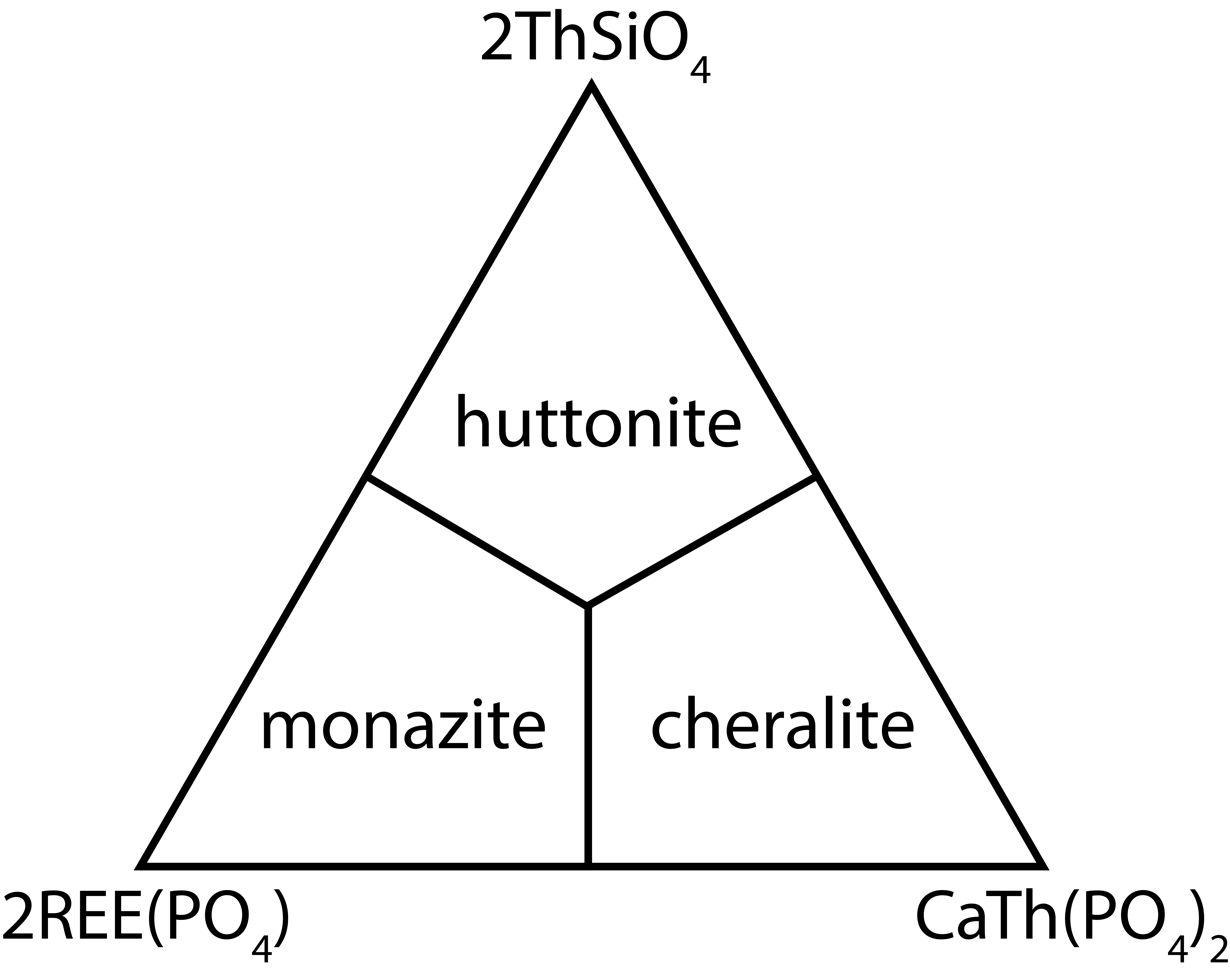
Monazite – cheralite – huttonite system

Monazite geochronology can also reveal igneous differentiation events such as magma mixing, where the magma chamber is evolved into a different composition. Isomorphous substitution is one of the examples. It is a form of substitution in which one element is replaced by another without changing the crystal structure. In the case of monazite, the rare earth elements are replaced by Ca and Th.

$2REE^{3+}\leftrightarrow Ca^{2+}+Th^{4+}$

Different levels of substitution form a range of compositions, with endmembers monazite [2REE(PO_{4})], brabantite [Ca,Th(PO_{4})_{2}] and huttonite [2ThSiO_{4}]. The level of substitution usually depends upon melt composition and the geological environment.

=== Hydrothermal alteration ===
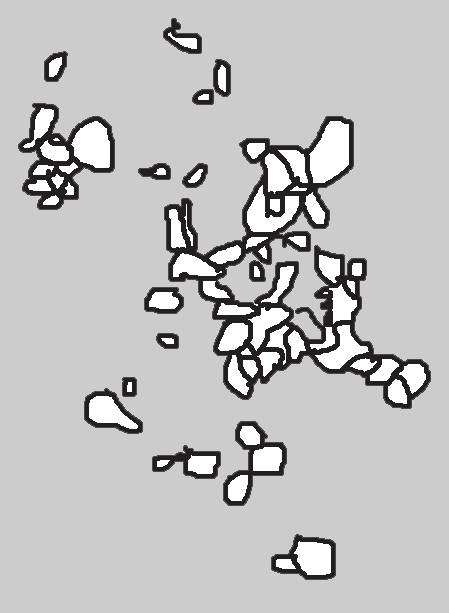
Illustration showing clusters formed by multiple crystals. Edited after Schandl (2004)

Hydrothermal processes are usually coupled with igneous processes. Monazite geochronology helps studying the evolution from igneous processes to hydrothermal processes, and revealing later hydrothermal alteration, which is vital in the study of ore formation.

Although it is hard to distinguish between magmatic monazite and hydrothermal monazite, analysing the texture and pattern of monazite may help distinguish them. Hydrothermal monazites tend to appear in clusters of multiple crystals, while igneous monazites tend to appear homogeneously distributed throughout the rock. Also, hydrothermal monazites usually contain low ThO_{2} content. These distinctive features can be easily identified with textural and compositional analysis in monazite geochronology.

=== Metamorphism ===
Monazite geochronology is generally regarded as a powerful tool to reveal metamorphic history. Metamorphism is the mineralogical and textural changes in preexisting rocks in response to a change in environment to different temperatures and pressures. It occurs at a temperature above diagenesis (~200 °C) and below melting (>800 °C). The mineral assemblage formed by metamorphism depends on the composition of the parent rock (protolith) and more importantly, the stability of different minerals at varying temperature and pressure (P-T). A set of mineral assemblages that form under similar temperature and pressure is called a metamorphic facies. Most mineral changes during rock burial, uplift, hydrothermal processes and deformation are associated with metamorphic reactions.

Monazite is commonly found in many metamorphic rocks, especially in those formed from pelites and sandstones. The zonation in monazite reflects the successive monazite forming events. They may be formed from reactions along a single pressure-temperature (P-T) loop in a phase diagram, or reactions without changing P-T. For a metamorphic event, monazite is formed by the reactions with more than one P-T loop.

The objective of monazite geochronology is to relate these monazite forming events/reactions with P-T conditions. We can then put time constrains on the P-T loops, forming a comprehensive pressure-temperature-time loops revealing the metamorphic history of the rocks.

==== Monazite inclusions in metamorphic porphyroblasts and matrix ====
(1–3) A simplified diagram showing generations of monazite inclusions in different porphyroblasts and matrix.

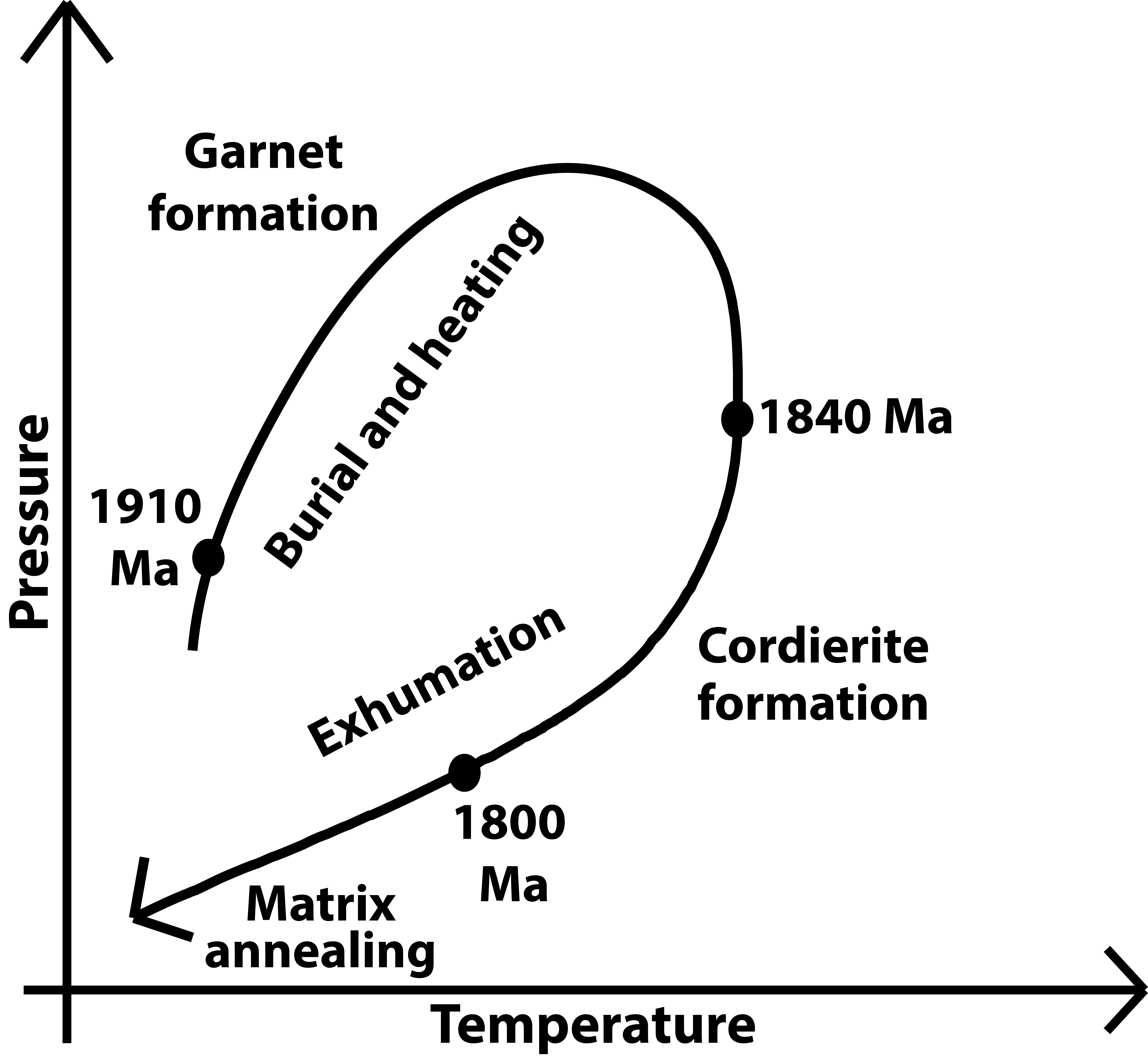
P-T path associated with generation of monazite inclusion-bearing porphyroblast and matrix

Different porphyroblasts like garnet and quartz are often formed during metamorphism in different ranges of P-T. Monazite grains are often found as inclusion in porphyroblasts. Since the host mineral monazite is quite thermally resistant, these inclusions are protected from age resetting, even with a prolonged exposure at temperature higher than 800 °C, this enables us to restrict an upper limit of the age of the porphyroblasts, and thus the associated metamorphic events.

For example, a metamorphic rock in the Neil Bay area of northern Saskatchewan underwent high grade (high P/T) metamorphism followed by exhumation (uplift). The porphyroblast of garnet was formed during high grade metamorphism while the porphyroblast of cordierite was formed during subsequent exhumation. Both porphyroblasts contain monazite inclusions which were dated at 1910 Ma and 1840 Ma, respectively. And matrix monazite is dated 1800 Ma. Thus, it is interpreted that high grade metamorphism occurred after 1910 Ma and before 1840 Ma, while exhumation occurred after 1840 Ma, and the final annealing (cooling and coarsening of minerals) happened at 1800 Ma.

Within the same setting as above, monazite inclusions in garnet maybe either younger than, older than or have similar ages with the matrix monazite. Both of them may even have a wide range of ages with no systematic distribution. These scenarios are interpreted to represent different metamorphic paths and conditions, giving varying or complex sequences of metamorphic reactions.

==== Elemental fractionation between monazite and silicates ====
Elemental fractionation refers to the difference between the amount of an element incorporated into the solid mineral phase and the amount left in the fluid phase. Minerals display preferential intake of certain elements during growth. For example, as monazite grows in size, it preferentially incorporates Th in its crystal structure, resulting in less available Th in the fluid for future monazite growth. Thus, younger monazite tends to have lower Th content. This is one of the principal reasons for the compositional variation of monazite.

When considering the whole system of metamorphic rocks, there are other minerals which show elemental fractionation. The interplay between fractionation in monazite and these other minerals has a great impact on the compositional zonation of monazite. The interplay is often caused by the formation and breakdown of the minerals, which is a result of different stages in P-T paths. Dating fractionation-related zonation thus helps put time constraints on metamorphism.

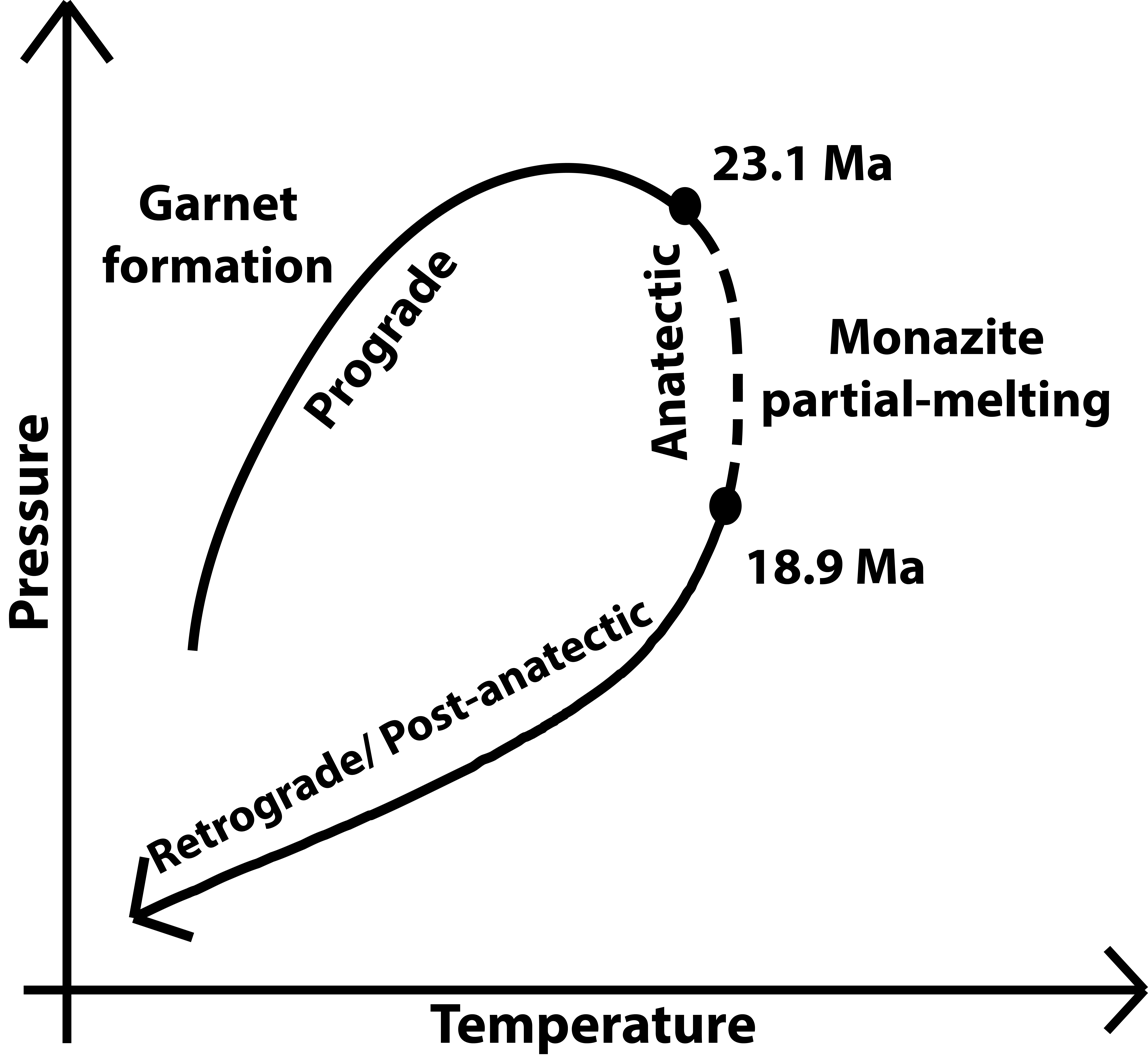
P-T path corresponding to formation of low-Y core and high-Y rim of monazite

The mostly studied system is yttrium (Y) fractionation between the phosphate monazite and the silicates garnet and xenotime. All three minerals preferentially fractionate Y, yet they form and break down at different stages of metamorphism. Xenotime has the highest fractionating power, then garnet and then monazite. In a simplified case of a clockwise P-T path involving garnet and monazite, garnet grows along a prograde path with Y continuously being incorporated, thus the Y content in monazite formed at this stage (prograde) should decrease progressively with higher grade. However, as temperature increases to a certain point, partial melting (anatectic) of monazite occurs around its rim, releasing Y into the melts. As the system later cools and melt crystallizes, regrown monazite will have higher Y content. Partial melting usually happens during peak metamorphism (the highest temperature in a P-T path), but age and chemical information during this stage are not recorded since the monazite is melting. However, the ages of last prograde growth rim (lowest Y) and the first post-anatectic growth rim (highest Y) usually bracket the time of partial melting.

Another scenario involves the formation or breakdown of garnet, influencing the Y and HREE (heavy rare earth elements) content in the environment, thus the content of growing monazite. Basically, monazites grown before garnet formation have a higher Y and HREE content than those formed during or after garnet formation. As garnet starts breaking down in the later stage of metamorphism, monazite rims rich in Y and HREE will form.

The extent of fractionation of Y between garnet and monazite is also found to be related to temperature. It is thus used as a thermometer, providing temperature constraints on the P-T path.

=== Deformation ===
Timing deformation events is one of the important components in a tectonic study. Large scale cross-cutting relationships between rocks, dikes and plutons provide certain but relatively broad time constraints on deformation. Monazite can be incorporated into deformation fabrics, reaction textures and fractures; thus, studying microfabrics and microtextures of monazite offers a more straightforward method of dating a deformation event.

==== Deformation metamorphic reactions ====
Deformation events may trigger metamorphic reactions which produce monazite. For example, a metamorphic reaction associated with the movement in the Legs Lake shear zone partly replaced garnet with cordierite. This reaction also generated new monazite with high content of Y, and dated around 1850 Ma. The age is interpreted as the timing of shearing.

Monazite-forming reactions may happen a bit later than shearing after the rocks have been in re-equilibrium in response to a new pressure environment. That means monazite age may not be closely equivalent to shearing age, but it provides a more precise age than other methods.

==== Monazite deformation fabrics ====
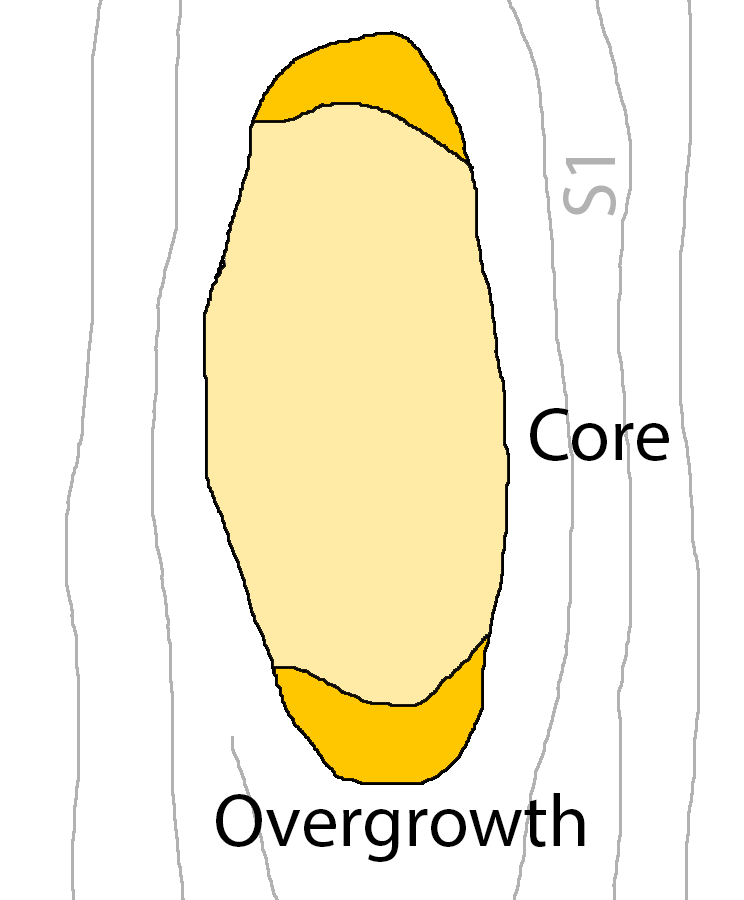
Monazite grain is aligned with foliation S1. New monazite overgrowth grows along S1 direction. Edited after Mccoy, 2005.

Monazite can form in fabrics caused by deformation. Monazite may be present as elongate grains aligned in foliation. It can be interpreted that either the monazite formed before the shearing and was aligned during shearing, or formed at the same time as the shearing. It thus provides an upper limit of the shearing age. For example, if the monazite is dated 800 Ma, the age of shearing cannot be older than 800 Ma.

However, it can also be interpreted that the monazite grew along the foliation of other minerals long after the shearing. This problem can be solved by analysing the compositional domains of monazite. Monazite along existing foliation would have a tendency to grow at the two ends along the foliation. If we can find monazite overgrowths with different compositions and ages along at the two opposite ends of the grain, it is likely that the date of the monazite overgrowth is younger than the shearing.

==== Monazite fracture ====
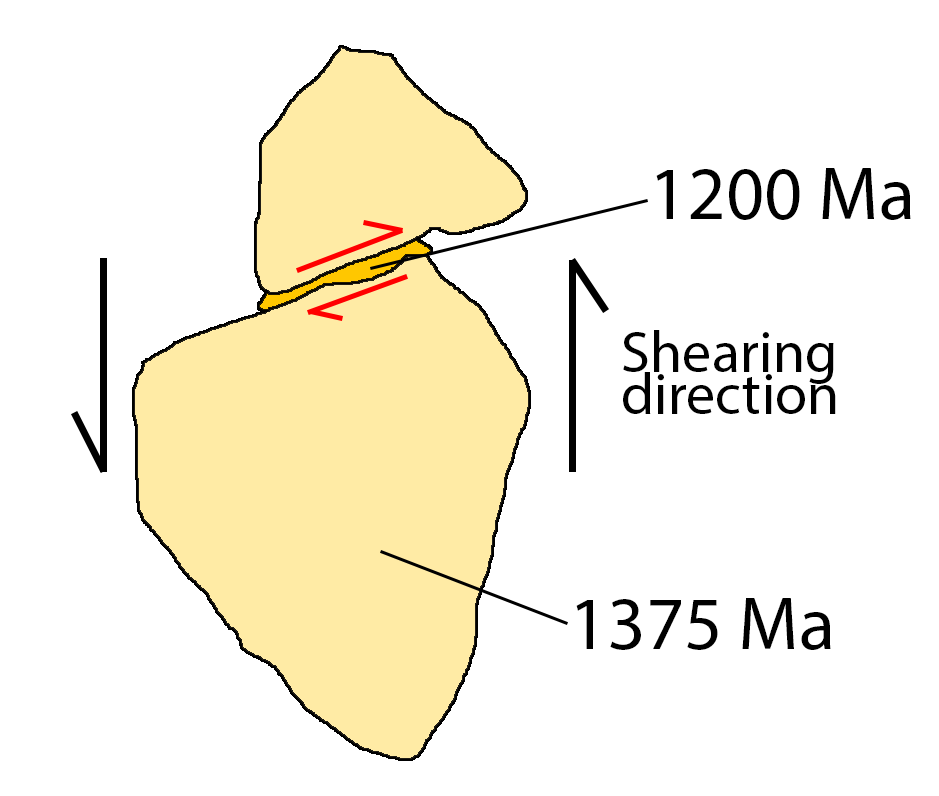
Schematic diagram showing monazite fracture and refilling monazite. The monazite crystal with lighter color is fractured by shearing. Later, new monazite with a new composition and darker color forms along the fracture. Modified from Shaw (2001).

Fractures and offsets in a single monazite crystal have been observed mimicking bookshelf faulting in a larger-scale fracturing event. The fractured grain is dated 1375 Ma, indicating that the large-scale displacement happened after this date. Moreover, new monazite may later grow and fill up the space created by the fracture, enclosing the time constraint completely. For example, if the new monazite is dated at 1200 Ma, the displacement probably occurred between 1375 and 1200 Ma.

=== Sedimentary events ===
==== Detrital monazite ====
Detrital monazite grains are produced by the weathering and erosion of pre-existing rocks and then transported into sedimentary basins. The detrital monazite contains zonation patterns which preserve the geological history of the source region. Investigating detrital monazite in the basin not only helps in reconstructing the metamorphic, tectonic and hydrothermal history of the source region, but also finding the depositional age, structural evolution and sediment sources of the basin. For example, the domain with youngest age may represent exhumation of source rock, which is followed by immediate erosion and deposition.

==== Diagenetic monazite ====
Diagenetic monazite is the monazite that formed during or after the lithification of sedimentary rocks. Monazite has been observed to grow on other minerals or in pore spaces during diagenesis of sediments. Studying diagenetic monazite provides a good method to study the age, geochemical and thermal evolution of sedimentary basins, in particular those in the Precambrian with little fossil age controls.

=== Industrial Use ===
U-Th-Pb data and monazite ages can be used as a valuable tool for prospecting. It was shown for 3 localities in Pisecke Hory Region, the Czech Republic.
