= Monazite-(La) =

Crystalline LaPO4

General
- Category: Phosphate mineral
- Formula: LaPO_{4}
- IMA symbol: Mnz-La
- Crystal system: Monoclinic
- Crystal class: Prismatic: 2/m
- Space group: P2_{1}/n
- Unit cell: a = 6.84, b = 7.07, c = 6.45 [Å]; β = β = 103.85◦

Identification

Monazite-(La) is a relatively rare representative of the monazite group, with lanthanum being the dominant rare earth element in its structure. As such, it is the lanthanum analogue of monazite-(Ce), monazite-(Nd), and monazite-(Sm). It is also the phosphorus analogue of gasparite-(La). The group contains simple rare earth phosphate minerals with the general formula of ATO_{4}, where A = Ce, La, Nd, or Sm (or, rarely, Bi), and B = P or, rarely, As. The A site may also bear Ca and Th.
