= Monazite-(Ce) =

Crystalline CePO4

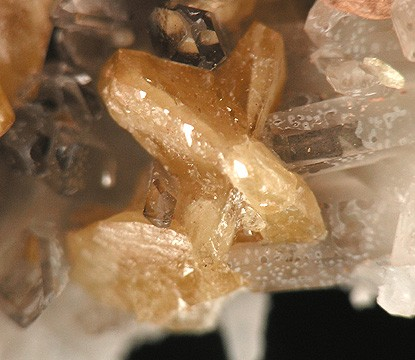
- Monazite-(Ce), Quartz. Locality: Siglo Veinte Mine (Siglo XX Mine; Llallagua Mine; Catavi), Llallagua, Rafael Bustillo Province, Potosí Department, Bolivia (Locality at mindat.org). Size: 3.5 × 2.6 × 1.3 cm.

General
- Category: Phosphate mineral
- Formula: CePO_{4}
- IMA symbol: Mnz-Ce
- Crystal system: Monoclinic
- Crystal class: Prismatic: 2/m
- Space group: P2_{1}/b
- Unit cell: a = 6.7902, b = 7.0203, c = 6.4674 [Å]; β = 103.6°

Identification

Monazite-(Ce) (CePO_{4}) is the most common representative of the monazite group. It is the cerium-dominant analogue of monazite-(La), monazite-(Nd), and monazite-(Sm). It is also the phosphorus analogue of gasparite-(Ce). The group contains simple rare earth phosphate minerals with the general formula of AXO_{4}, where A = Ce, La, Nd, or Sm (or, rarely, Bi), and X = P or, rarely, As. The A site may also bear Ca and Th.
