= Monazite-(Sm) =

Crystalline SmPO4

General
- Category: Phosphate mineral
- Formula: SmPO_{4}
- IMA symbol: Mnz-Sm
- Crystal system: Monoclinic
- Crystal class: Prismatic: 2/m
- Space group: P2_{1}/m
- Unit cell: a = 6.725, b = 6.936, c = 6.448 Å; β = 104.02°

Identification

Monazite-(Sm) is an exceedingly rare representative of the monazite group, with samarium being the dominant rare earth element in its structure. It is the samarium analogue of monazite-(Ce), monazite-(La), and monazite-(Nd). It is only the second known mineral with samarium being the mineral-forming element, after florencite-(Sm). The group contains simple rare earth phosphate minerals with the general formula of ATO_{4}, where A = Ce, La, Nd, or Sm (or, rarely, Bi), and B = P or, rarely, As. The A site may also bear Ca and Th.
