= Monazite-(Nd) =

General
- Category: Phosphate mineral
- Formula: NdPO_{4}
- IMA symbol: Mnz-Nd
- Crystal system: Monoclinic
- Crystal class: Prismatic: 2/m
- Space group: P2_{1}/n
- Unit cell: a = 6.745, b = 6.964, c = 6.435 [Å]; β = β = 103.65◦

Identification

Monazite-(Nd) is a relatively rare representative of the monazite group, with neodymium being the dominant rare earth element in its structure. This variety of monazite is typically colored bright rose-red. It is the neodymium analogue of monazite-(Ce), monazite-(La), and monazite-(Sm). The group contains simple rare earth phosphate minerals with the general formula of ATO_{4}, where A = Ce, La, Nd, or Sm (or, rarely, Bi), and B = P or, rarely, As. The A site may also bear Ca and Th.
