= Wakefieldite =

Rare-earth mineral series

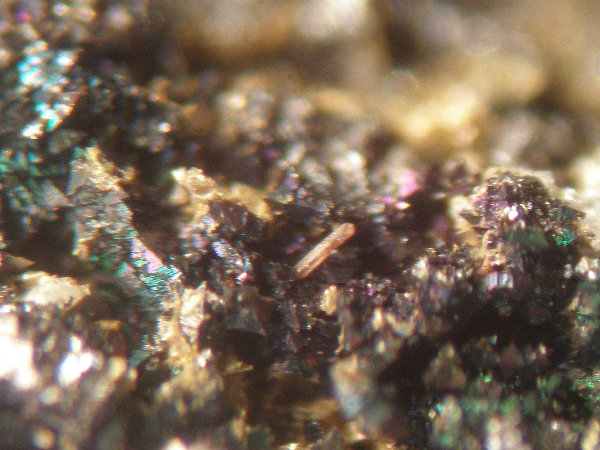
- Wakefieldite-(La) on hausmannite

General
- Category: Rare-earth mineral
- Formula: ((La,Ce,Nd,Y)VO_{4})
- IMA symbol: Wf
- Strunz classification: 8.AD.35
- Crystal system: Tetragonal
- Crystal class: Ditetragonal dipyramidal (4/mmm); H-M symbol: (4/m 2/m 2/m)
- Space group: I4_{1}/amd

Identification
- Color: Canary-yellow, pale tan (Wakefieldite-(Y)); Dark red to coal-black, pale yellow to bluish gray (Wakefieldite-(Ce)); Light pink, brown (Wakefieldite-(La)
- Crystal habit: Prismatic crystals, pulverulent masses
- Cleavage: Good on {100}
- Tenacity: Very brittle
- Mohs scale hardness: 4–5
- Diaphaneity: Translucent to opaque
- Specific gravity: 4.25 (calculated Wakefieldite-(Y)); 4.74 (meas. Wakefieldite-(Ce)
- Optical properties: Uniaxial (+)
- Refractive index: n_{ω} = 2.000, n_{ε} = 2.140

Wakefieldite ((La,Ce,Nd,Y)VO_{4}) is an uncommon rare-earth element vanadate mineral. There are four main types described of wakefieldite- wakefieldite-(La), wakefieldite-(Ce), wakefieldite-(Nd), and wakefieldite-(Y), depending upon the dominant rare-earth metal ion present. Wakefieldite has a Mohs hardness ranging from 4 to 5. Wakefieldite forms crystals of tetragonal structure. In terms of crystal structure, it is the vanadate analog of the rare-earth phosphate mineral xenotime. Unlike xenotime, it is more favorable for wakefieldite to contain the lighter rare-earth elements over the heavier ones. Due to the lanthanide contraction, the heavier rare earths have smaller ionic radii than the lighter ones. When the phosphate anion is replaced by the larger vanadate anion, the tetragonal crystal system preferentially accommodates the larger light rare-earth elements.

Wakefieldite was first described for an occurrence in the Evans Lou mine, St. Pierre de Wakefield, Quebec, Canada and later designated Wakefieldite-(Y).
