= Chernovite-(Ce) =

Phosphate mineral

General
- Category: Phosphate minerals
- Formula: (Ce,Y)(AsO_{4})
- IMA status: Unnamed (probably valid)
- Strunz classification: 8.AD.35
- Crystal system: Tetragonal

Identification
- Mohs scale hardness: 4 - 4.5
- Luster: Vitreous

Chernovite-(Ce) is a questionable mineral and an analogue of Chernovite-(Y). Its crystal system is tetragonal.

== See also ==
- Chernovite-(Y)
