= Monazite =

Mineral containing rare-earth elements

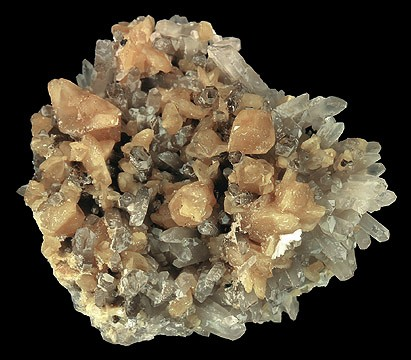
- Monazite-(Ce)

General
- Category: Phosphate minerals
- Formula: (Ce,La,Th)PO_{4}
- Strunz classification: 8.AD.50
- Crystal system: Monoclinic
- Crystal class: Prismatic (2/m) (same H–M symbol)
- Space group: P2_{1}/n

Identification
- Color: Orange, purple, reddish brown, brown, pale yellow, pink, blue, green, gray,
- Crystal habit: Commonly as prismatic or wedge-shaped crystals
- Twinning: Contact twins common
- Cleavage: Distinct on [100] poor on [010]
- Fracture: Conchoidal to uneven
- Mohs scale hardness: 5.0–5.5
- Luster: Resinous, vitreous to adamantine
- Streak: White
- Diaphaneity: Translucent to opaque
- Specific gravity: 4.6–5.7 (4.98–5.43 for monazite-Ce)
- Optical properties: Biaxial (+)
- Refractive index: n_{α} = 1.770–1.793 n_{β} = 1.778–1.800 n_{γ} = 1.823–1.860
- Pleochroism: Weak
- 2V angle: 10–26°
- Melting point: 1900–2100
- Other characteristics: Radioactive if uranium and/or thorium-rich, dull brown cathodoluminescence, paramagnetic
- Magnetism: Paramagnetic, moderately strongly

Monazite is a primarily reddish-brown phosphate mineral that contains rare-earth elements. Due to variability in composition, monazite is considered a group of minerals. The most common species of the group is monazite-(Ce), that is, the cerium-dominant member of the group.

== Types ==
There are five different most common species of monazite, depending on the relative amounts of the rare-earth elements in the mineral:

- monazite-(Ce), (Ce,La,Nd,Th)PO_{4} (the most common member)
- monazite-(La), (La,Ce,Nd)PO_{4}
- monazite-(Nd), (Nd,La,Ce)PO_{4}
- monazite-(Sm), (Sm,Gd,Ce,Th)PO_{4}
- monazite-(Gd), PO_{4}

Monazite-(Ce) is by far the most common of the group. It occurs usually in small isolated crystals. It has a hardness of 5.0 to 5.5 on the Mohs scale of mineral hardness and its specific gravity (aka relative density) is also 5 to 5.5.

The elements in parentheses are listed in the order of their relative proportion within the mineral: lanthanum is the most common rare-earth element in monazite-(La), and so forth. Silica (SiO_{2}) is present in trace amounts, as well as small amounts of uranium and thorium. Due to the alpha decay of thorium and uranium, monazite contains a significant amount of helium, which can be extracted by heating.

The following analyses are of monazite from: (I.) Burke County, North Carolina, US; (II.) Arendal, Norway; (III.) Emmaville, New South Wales, Australia.

		I.	II.	III.
Phosphorus pentoxide (P_{2}O_{5})		29.28	27.55	25.09
Cerium oxide (Ce_{2}O_{3})		31.38	29.20	36.64
Lanthanum oxide (La_{2}O_{3}); Didymium oxide (Di_{2}O_{3})	$\Big\}$	30.88	26.26	30.21
Yttrium oxide (Y_{2}O_{3})		—	3.82	—
Thorium oxide (ThO_{2})		6.49	9.57	1.23
Silica (SiO_{2})		1.40	1.86	3.21
Alumina (Al_{2}O_{3})		—	—	3.11
Iron oxide (Fe_{2}O_{3})		—	1.13	—
Lime (CaO)		—	0.69	—
Water (H_{2}O)		0.20	0.52	—
		99.63	100.60	99.49
Specific gravity		5.10	5.15	5.001

Monazite is an important ore for thorium, lanthanum, and cerium. It is often found in placer deposits. India, Madagascar, and South Africa have large deposits of monazite sands. The deposits in India are particularly rich in monazite.

Monazite is radioactive due to the presence of thorium and, less commonly, uranium. The radiogenic decay of uranium and thorium to lead enables monazite to be dated through monazite geochronology. Monazite crystals often have multiple distinct zones that formed through successive geologic events that lead to monazite crystallization. These domains can be dated to gain insight into the geologic history of its host rocks.

The name monazite comes from the Ancient Greek: μονάζειν, romanized: monázein (to be solitary), via German Monazit, in allusion to its isolated crystals.

== Structure ==
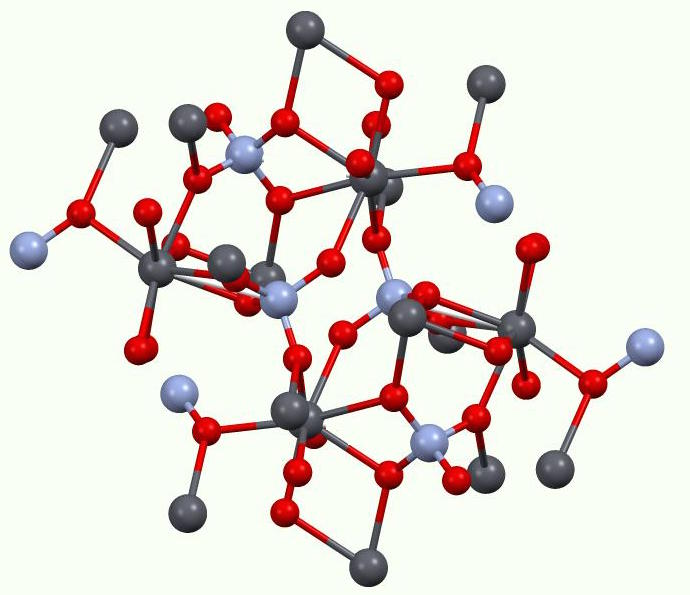
Structure of monazite. Color scheme: red = O, pale blue = P, dark gray = Ce(III) and other lanthanides and actinides.

All monazites adopt the same structure, meaning that the connectivity of the atoms is very similar to other compounds of the type M(III)PO_{4}. The M(III) centers have a distorted coordination sphere being surrounded by eight oxides with M–O distances around 2.6 Å in length. The phosphate anion is tetrahedral, as usual. The same structural motif is observed for lead chromate (PbCrO_{4}). Monazite also shares many structural similarities with; zircon, xenotime, scheelite, anhydrite, barite, and rhabdophane.

== Mining history ==
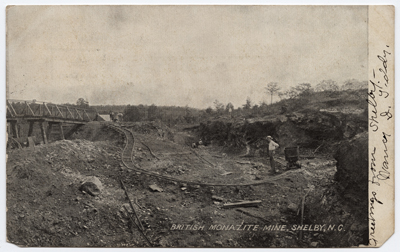
Postcard view of a monazite mine in Shelby, North Carolina, showing cart tracks and a bridge

Monazite sand from Brazil was first noticed in sand carried in ship's ballast by Carl Auer von Welsbach in the 1880s. Von Welsbach was looking for thorium for his newly invented incandescent mantles. Monazite sand was quickly adopted as the thorium source and became the foundation of the rare-earth industry.

Monazite sand was also briefly mined in North Carolina, United States, but, shortly thereafter, extensive deposits in southern India were found. Brazilian and Indian monazite dominated the industry before World War II. After World War II, monazite mining shifted to South Africa.

It was in monazite that the discovery of the first radium-bearing ore was identified in Australia in 1904 by T. H. Laby and Douglas Mawson, who analysed samples of monazite collected from the Pilbara in Western Australia. The samples were tested in the University of Sydney engineering laboratory. Edgeworth David made the formal presentation of their paper describing their findings to the Royal Society of New South Wales on 5 October 1904. There are large monazite deposits in Australia.

Monazite was the only significant source of commercial lanthanides, but because of concern over the disposal of the radioactive daughter products of thorium, bastnäsite came to displace monazite in the production of lanthanides in the 1960s due to its much lower thorium content. Increased interest in thorium for nuclear energy may bring monazite back into commercial use.

== Mineralization and extraction ==
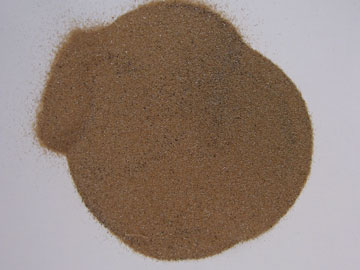
Monazite powder

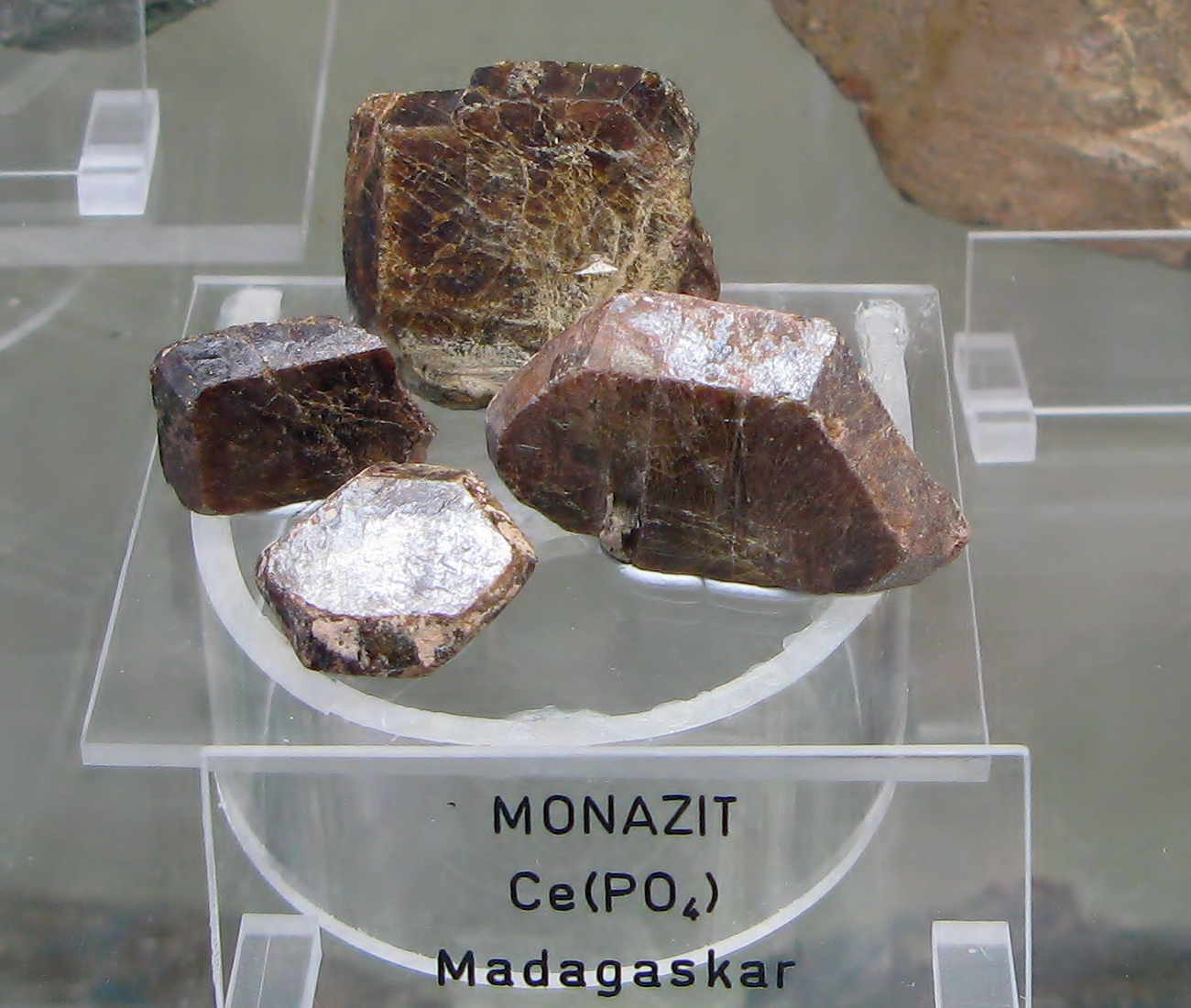
Monazite from Madagascar, displayed in the Mineralogical Museum, Bonn, Germany

Because of their high density, monazite minerals concentrate in alluvial sands when released by the weathering of pegmatites. These so-called placer deposits are often beach or fossil beach sands and contain other heavy minerals of commercial interest such as zircon and ilmenite. Monazite can be isolated as a nearly pure concentrate by the use of gravity, magnetic, and electrostatic separation.

Monazite sand deposits are prevalently of the monazite-(Ce) composition. Typically, the lanthanides in such monazites contain about 45–48% cerium, about 24% lanthanum, about 17% neodymium, about 5% praseodymium, and minor quantities of samarium, gadolinium, and yttrium. Europium concentrations tend to be low, about 0.05%. South African "rock" monazite, from Steenkampskraal, was processed in the 1950s and early 1960s by the Lindsay Chemical Division of American Potash and Chemical Corporation, at the time the largest producer of lanthanides in the world. Steenkampskraal monazite provided a supply of the complete set of lanthanides. Very low concentrations of the heaviest lanthanides in monazite justified the term "rare" earth for these elements, with prices to match. Thorium content of monazite is variable and sometimes can be up to 20–30%. Monazite from certain carbonatites or from Bolivian tin ore veins is essentially thorium-free. However, commercial monazite sands typically contain between 6 and 12% thorium oxide.

=== Acid cracking ===
The original process for "cracking" monazite so as to extract the thorium and lanthanide content was to heat it with concentrated sulfuric acid to temperatures between 120 and 150 °C (250 and 300 °F) for several hours. Variations in the ratio of acid to ore, the extent of heating, and the extent to which water was added afterwards led to several different processes to separate thorium from the lanthanides. One of the processes caused the thorium to precipitate out as a phosphate or pyrophosphate in crude form, leaving a solution of lanthanide sulfates, from which the lanthanides could be easily precipitated as a double sodium sulfate. The acid methods led to the generation of considerable acid waste, and loss of the phosphate content of the ore.

=== Alkaline cracking ===
A more recent process uses hot sodium hydroxide solution (73%) at about 140 °C (280 °F). This process allows the valuable phosphate content of the ore to be recovered as crystalline trisodium phosphate. The lanthanide/thorium hydroxide mixture can be treated with hydrochloric acid to provide a solution of lanthanide chlorides, and an insoluble sludge of the less-basic thorium hydroxide.

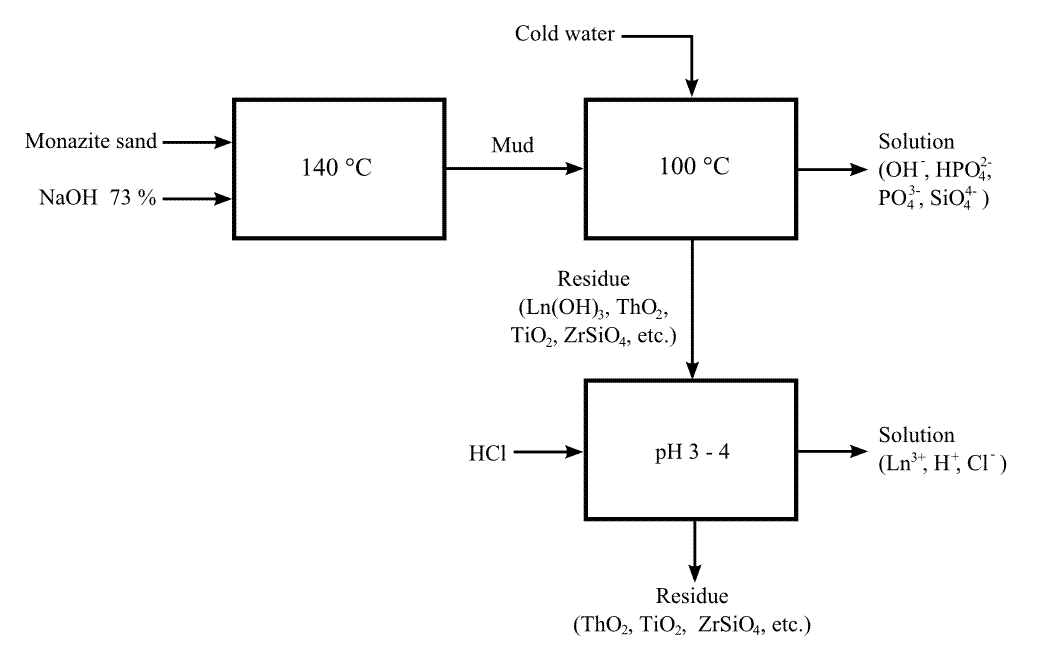

=== Extraction of rare-earth metals from monazite ore ===
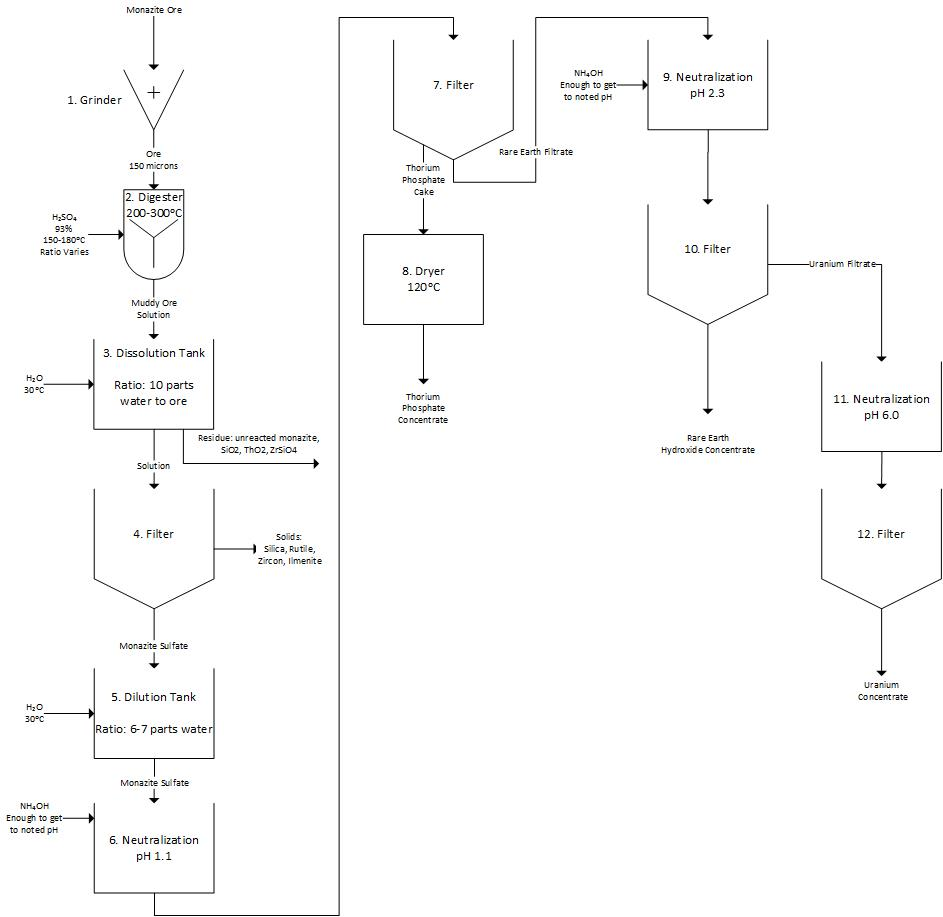
Process flow diagram for extraction of rare-earth metals from monazite ore using hydrometallurgy

The extraction of rare-earth metals from monazite ore begins with digestion with sulfuric acid followed by aqueous extraction. The process requires many neutralizations and filtrations.

The final products yielded for this process are thorium-phosphate concentrate, RE hydroxides, and uranium concentrate. Depending on the relative market prices of uranium, thorium, and rare earth elements as well as the availability of customers and the logistics of delivering to them, some or all of those products may be economical to sell or further process into a marketable form, while others constitute tailings for disposal. Products of the uranium and thorium decay series, particularly radium will be present in trace amounts and form a radiotoxic hazard. While radium-228 (a product of thorium decay) will be present only in extremely minute amounts (less than one milligram per metric ton of thorium), and will decay away with a half-life of roughly 5.75 years, radium-226 will be present at a ratio above 300 milligrams per metric ton of uranium and due to its long half-life (~1600 years) will essentially remain with the residue. As radium forms the least soluble alkaline earth metal sulfate known, radium sulfate will be present among the solid filtration products after sulfuric acid has been added.

== Containing nuclear waste ==
In two studies, one testing synthetic monazite's radioactive waste storage capabilities by submerging it in a contaminated wastewater system for an extended period of time, and the other comparing the durability of the crystalline structures of multiple minerals, they investigate the ability of monazite to act as a host for nuclear byproducts from high-grade plutonium in decommissioned nuclear weapons and spent fuel from nuclear reactors. Results from both investigations show that monazite is one of the better options for storage in comparison to the previously used borosilicate glass.

One study done at Oak Ridge National Laboratory in Tennessee the performance of synthetic monazite to borosilicate glass in radioactive waste management is compared. This experiment involved synthetic monazite and borosilicate glass being soaked in a contaminated simulated Savannah River defense wastes for 28 days, during the time period the leaching rates from both materials were measured. The results show that the synthetic monazite is a far more effective material for containing radioactive waste due to its low leaching rates and slow corrosion rate.

In a second study natural monazite is found to have an enhanced ability to deal with radiation byproducts due the property of radiation "resistance" as it is able to remain crystalline after being subjected to high amounts of alpha-decay radiation and becoming amorphized. Due to this high durability, it is seen as a better alternative for hosting materials such as radioactive strontium than other tested minerals. Synthetic monazite is also shown to have similar durability to that of the natural crystalline samples after it becomes fully amorphized.
