= Xenotime =

Phosphate mineral

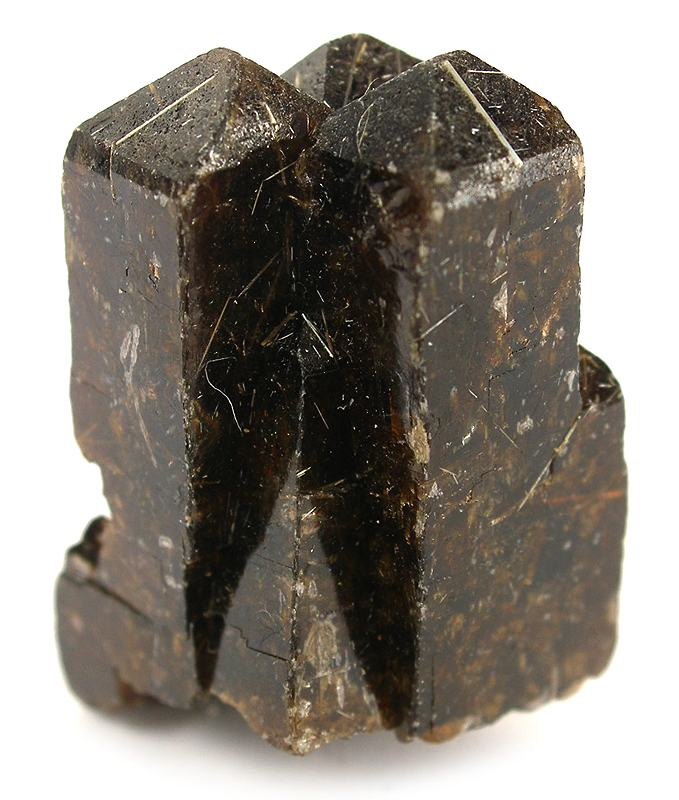
- Xenotime with rutile

General
- Category: Phosphate minerals
- Formula: YPO_{4}
- IMA symbol: Xtm
- Strunz classification: 8.AD.35
- Crystal system: Tetragonal
- Crystal class: Dipyramidal (4/mmm); H-M symbol: (4/m)
- Space group: I4_{1}/a

Identification
- Color: Brown, brownish yellow, gray
- Crystal habit: Prismatic, radial aggregates, granular
- Cleavage: Perfect [100]
- Fracture: Uneven to splintery
- Mohs scale hardness: 4.5
- Luster: Vitreous to resinous
- Streak: Pale brown, yellowish or reddish, to white
- Diaphaneity: Translucent to opaque
- Specific gravity: 4.4–5.1
- Refractive index: 1.720–1.815
- Birefringence: δ = 0.096
- Pleochroism: Dichroic
- Other characteristics: Not radioactive or luminescent

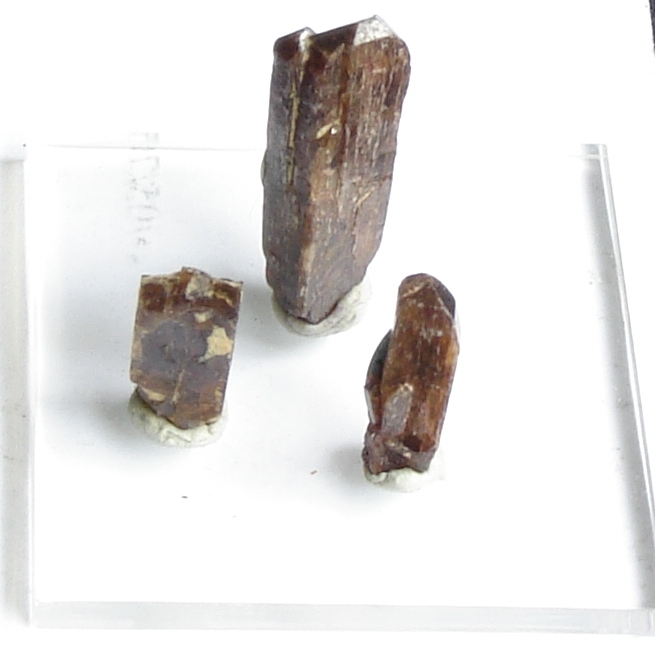
A sample of xenotime

Xenotime is a rare-earth phosphate mineral, the major component of which is yttrium orthophosphate (YPO_{4}). The phosphate ions are described by a tetrahedral shape and coordinate to the center Y^{3+} metal ion in a way that closely resembles the structure of zircon (ZrSiO_{4}). It forms a solid solution series with chernovite-(Y) (YAsO_{4}) and therefore may contain trace impurities of arsenic, as well as silicon dioxide and calcium. Other iso-structural ions that undergo exchanges with PO_{4} are VO_{4} and NbO_{4} ions, contributing to the list of possible co-occurring elements that may be in need of separation. The rare-earth elements dysprosium, erbium, terbium and ytterbium, as well as metal elements such as thorium and uranium (all replacing yttrium) are the expressive secondary components of xenotime. Due to uranium and thorium impurities, some xenotime specimens may be weakly to strongly radioactive. Lithiophyllite, monazite and purpurite are sometimes grouped with xenotime in the informal "anhydrous phosphates" group. Xenotime is used chiefly as a source of yttrium and heavy lanthanide metals (dysprosium, ytterbium, erbium and gadolinium). Occasionally, gemstones are also cut from the finest xenotime crystals.

== Etymology ==
The name xenotime is written originally kenotime from the Greek words kenós (κενός) 'vain' and timē (τιμή) 'honor', akin to 'vainglory'. It was coined by French mineralogist François Sulpice Beudant as a rebuke of another scientist, Swedish chemist Jöns Jacob Berzelius, for the latter's premature claim to have found in the mineral a new chemical element (he named it Thorium, but later understood to be a compound of a previously discovered yttrium). The criticism was blunted, as over time kenotime was misread and misprinted xenotime with the error suggesting the etymology xénos (ξένος) + timē (τιμή) as 'different honor'. Xenotime was first described for an occurrence in Vest-Agder, Norway in 1824.

== Properties ==
Crystallising in the tetragonal (I4_{1}/amd) crystal system, xenotime is typically translucent to opaque (rarely transparent) in shades of brown to brownish yellow (most common) but also reddish to greenish brown and gray. Xenotime has a variable habit: It may be prismatic (stubby or slender and elongate) with dipyramidal terminations, in radial or granular aggregates, or rosettes. A soft mineral (Mohs hardness 4.5), xenotime is—in comparison to most other translucent minerals—fairly dense, with a specific gravity between 4.4–5.1. Its lustre, which may be vitreous to resinous, together with its crystal system, may lead to a confusion with zircon (ZrSiO_{4}), the latter having a similar crystal structure and with which xenotime may sometimes occur.

Xenotime has two directions of perfect prismatic cleavage and its fracture is uneven to irregular (sometimes splintery). It is considered brittle and its streak is white. The refractive index of xenotime is 1.720–1.815 with a birefringence of 0.095 (uniaxial positive). Xenotime is dichroic with pink, yellow or yellowish brown seen in the extraordinary ray and brownish yellow, grayish brown or greenish brown seen in the ordinary ray. There is no reaction under ultraviolet light. While xenotime may contain significant amounts of thorium or uranium, the mineral does not undergo metamictization like sphene or zircon would.

== Occurrence ==
Occurring as a minor accessory mineral, xenotime is found in pegmatites and other igneous rocks, as well as gneisses rich in mica and quartz. Associated minerals include biotite and other micas, chlorite group minerals, quartz, zircon, certain feldspars, analcime, anatase, brookite, rutile, siderite and apatite. Xenotime is also known to be diagenetic: It may form as minute grains or as extremely thin (less than 10 μ) coatings on detrital zircon grains in siliciclastic sedimentary rocks. The importance of these diagenetic xenotime deposits in the radiometric dating of sedimentary rocks is only beginning to be realized. The formation of uranium and lead in xenotime ores classifies xenotime as a U-Pb chronometer, meaning it can be used for geological dating using U-Th-Pb geochronology techniques. The spectrometry used in geochronology necessitates larger crystals of at least 10 μm, therefore SEM imaging is applied to identify crystals that meet the appropriate dimensions. After identification, there are various spectroscopy approaches and microprobes for geochronology: SIMS, EMPA, LA-ICP-MS, and ID-TIMS. Xenotime can be found in geological formations that formed from the mid-Archean age to the Mesozoic age, so geological dating using xenotime in sedimentary rocks is extensive and a useful application.

Discovered in 1824, xenotime's type locality is the island of Hidra (Hitterø) in what is now Flekkefjord Municipality in Agder county, Norway. Other notable localities include: Arendal and Tvedestrand, Norway; Novo Horizonte, São Paulo, Novo Horizonte, Bahia and Minas Gerais, Brazil; Madagascar and California, Colorado, Georgia, North Carolina and New Hampshire, United States. A new discovery of gemmy, colour change (brownish to yellow) xenotime has been reported from Afghanistan and been found in Pakistan. Due to their isostructural nature, it is common for xenotime and zircon to co-crystallize together as composites; either forming crystal twins or growths over one another. In geochemistry, it is advantageous to do on site analysis of a given ore in order to determine the identities and the percentage of its compositions. A popular method of doing so is XEOL imaging, but another method has to be applied to xenotime-zircon ores because there is no way to distinguish between the intensities and color of their respective luminescence spectra, as both have green emissions at 580 nm. The alternative method involves annealing of the ore followed by Cathodluminescence (CI) imaging techniques. This technique increases the intensity of only the zircon composition, allowing for ease in analysis. North of Mount Funabuse in Gifu Prefecture, Japan, a notable basaltic rock is quarried at a hill called Maru-Yama: crystals of xenotime and zircon arranged in a radiating, flower-like pattern are visible in polished slices of the rock, which is known as chrysanthemum stone (translated from the Japanese 菊石 kiku-ishi). This stone is widely appreciated in Japan for its ornamental value.

Small tonnages of xenotime sand are recovered in association with Malaysian tin mining, etc. and are processed commercially. The lanthanide content is typical of "yttrium earth" minerals and runs about two-thirds yttrium, with the remainder being mostly the heavy lanthanides, where the even-numbered lanthanides (such as Gd, Dy, Er, or Yb) each being present at about the 5% level, and the odd-numbered lanthanides (such as Tb, Ho, Tm, Lu) each being present at about the 1% level. Dysprosium is usually the most abundant of the even-numbered heavies, and holmium is the most abundant of the odd-numbered heavies. The lightest lanthanides are generally better represented in monazite while the heaviest lanthanides are in xenotime.

Xenotime ores have to undergo chemical treatments to separate the rare earth elements (RREs) that make up its composition. Firstly, leaching, or dissolving of the phosphate shell is performed using sulfuric acid (H_{2}SO_{4}) or sodium hydroxide (NaOH), leaving behind the mixed RREs. Various techniques can be applied next to further separate the individual elements. One is the use of ion exchange methods, which encourages different elution times for different lanthanides based on ionic bonding. The quaternary ammonium anion salt trioctyl methylammonium nitrate, or commonly referred to as Aliquat 336, is used to extract the lighter REEs from the heavier REEs. Yttrium is then extracted from the heavier REEs with thiocyanate salts. The remaining heavy RREs are further separated using various treatments of Aliquat 336 and nitrate salts.

== See also ==
- List of minerals
- Rare-earth mineral
- Wakefieldite
- Xenotime-(Gd)
