= Chernovite-(Y) =

Mineral

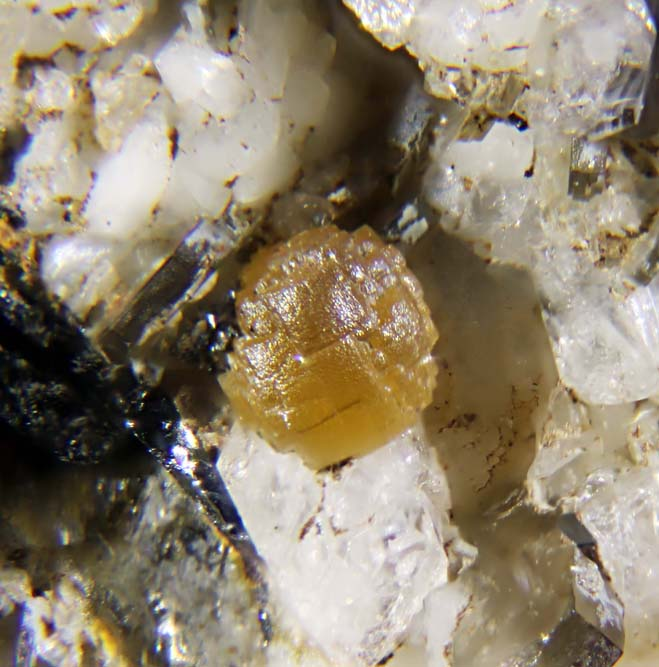
- Sample of Chernovite-(Y)

General
- Category: Xenotime group
- Formula: Y(AsO_{4})
- Strunz classification: 8.AD.35
- Crystal system: Tetragonal

Identification
- Color: Colourless, pale yellow
- Mohs scale hardness: 4.5-5
- Luster: Vitreous
- Streak: White
- Specific gravity: 4.866 g/cm3
- Other characteristics: Not radioactive or luminescent

Chernovite-(Y) is a mineral. It was first described in 1967 as Chernovite, named after the Russian geologist Aleksandr A. Chernov. The suffix -(Y) was added in 1987. It is a colourless to pale yellow mineral with a vitreous luster. It has a tetragonal crystalline structure, and has the chemical makeup of Y(AsO_{4}), which is yttrium, arsenic, and oxygen, at a 1:1:4 ratio. It has a specific gravity of 4.866g/cm3.

Chernovite-(Y) is part of the Xenotime group.

== See also ==
- Chernovite-(Ce)
