= Rare-earth mineral =

Mineral containing one or more rare-earth elements as major constituents

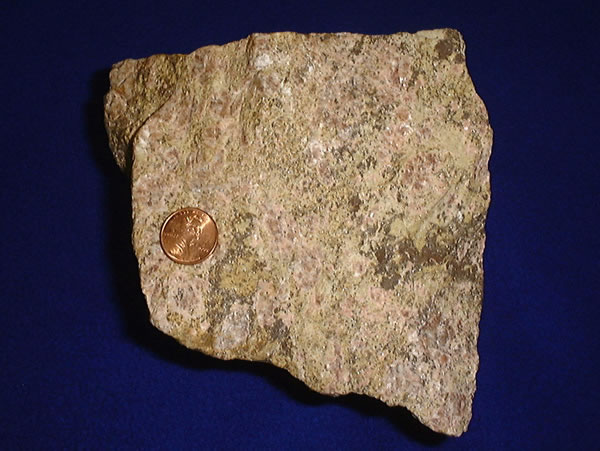
Rare-earth ore, shown with a United States penny for size comparison

A rare-earth mineral is a mineral that contains one or more rare-earth elements as major metal constituents. Rare-earths are to be distinguished from critical minerals, which are materials of strategic or economic importance that are defined differently by different countries.

== Definition and nomenclature ==
Minerals are solids composed of various inorganic elements, mixed through processes such as evaporation, pressure or other physical changes.

Rare-earth minerals are rare because rare-earth elements have unique geochemical properties that prevent them from easily forming minerals, and are therefore not normally found in deposits large or concentrated enough for mining. This is the reason they are called "rare earths".

Rare-earth minerals contain one or more of the 17 rare-earth elements, 15 of which are known as the lanthanides, the other two being scandium and yttrium.

Rare-earth elements or minerals are distinct from minerals or materials described as critical minerals or raw materials, which refers to materials that are considered to be of strategic or economic importance to a country. There is no single list, but individual governments compile lists of materials that are critical for their own economies.

== Common minerals containing rare-earth elements ==
Rare-earth minerals are usually found in association with alkaline to peralkaline igneous magmas in pegmatites or with carbonatite intrusives. Perovskite mineral phases are common hosts to rare-earth elements within the alkaline complexes. Mantle-derived carbonate melts are also carriers of rare earths. Hydrothermal deposits associated with alkaline magmatism contain a variety of rare-earth minerals.

Common hydrothermal minerals that often contain significant rare-earth elements include:

- aeschynite-(Ce)
- aeschynite-(Y)
- allanite
- apatite
- bastnäsite
- britholite
- brockite
- cerite
- dollaseite-(Ce)
- fluocerite
- fluorite
- gadolinite
- monazite
- parisite-(Ce)
- parisite-(La)
- stillwellite
- synchysite
- titanite
- wakefieldite
- xenotime
- zircon

== Mining ==
The presence of rare-earth minerals can be a valuable indicator in geological surveys and mineral resource assessments. There are over 160 rare-earth minerals known, but only four of these occur in amounts suitable for mining. They can occur in either primary or secondary deposits.

Primary deposits result from hydrothermal and igneous processes, while secondary deposits are sedimentary and formed through weathering processes. In the case of primary deposits, the minerals are generally found in the specific location where the elements came together to form the deposit. Secondary deposits have undergone metamorphic or sedimentary processes in a location different from where the minerals were actually formed. Depending on the type of deposit, various methods can be employed to extract the minerals from both primary and secondary deposits.

== Mined rare-earth minerals ==
=== Bastnäsite ===
Bastnäsite is a rare, semi-soluble carbonate mineral, primarily mined for its yttrium, used to make magnets for speakers, microphones, communication devices, and many other modern necessities. Bastnäsite deposits are found in China, Madagascar and the USA.

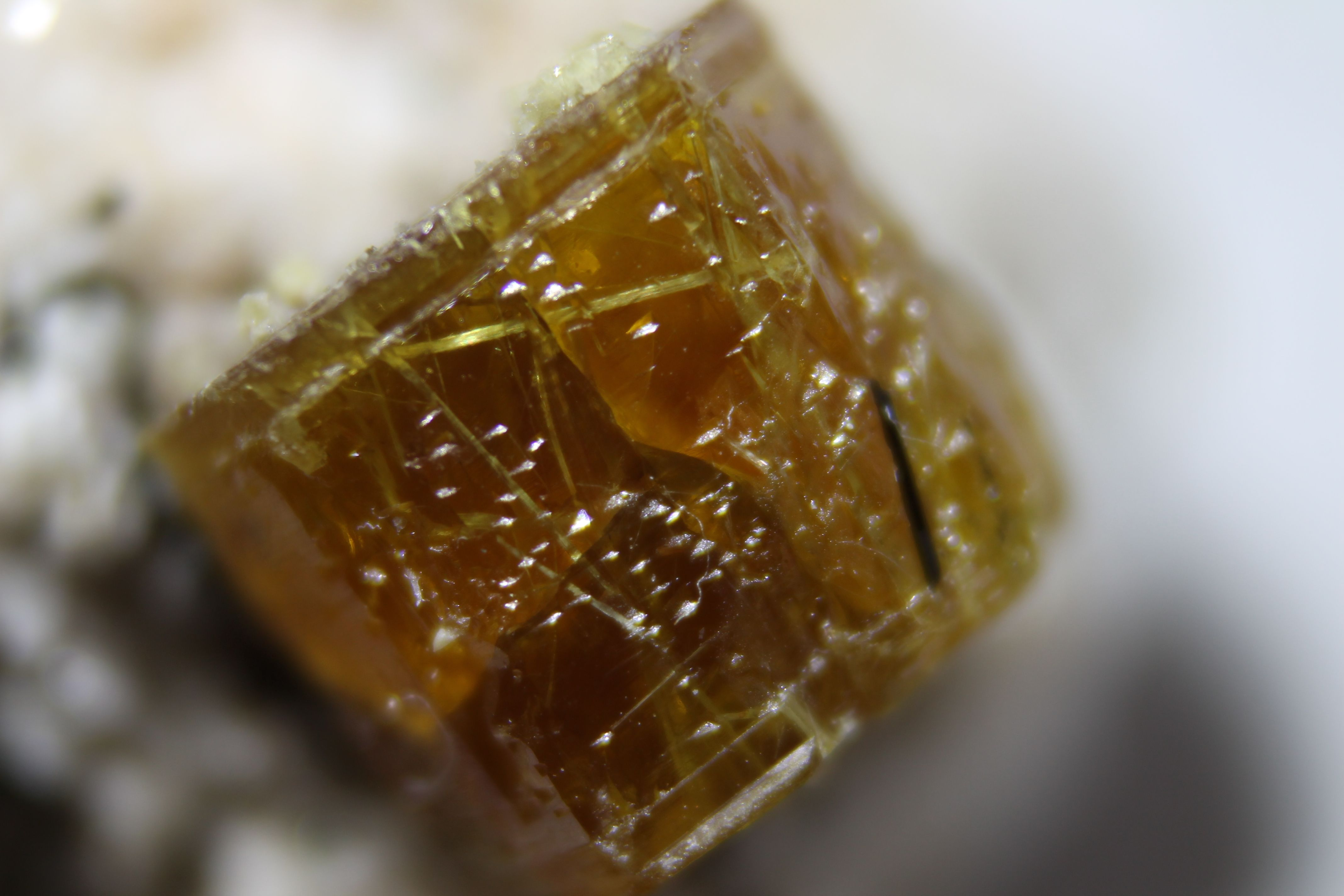
Bastnäsite is a dense mineral that contains three carbonate-fluoride atoms and typically forms luminous flattened crystals of a warm yellow honey colour.

=== Laterite clays ===
Laterite is a class of materials which contain significant amounts of aluminium and iron. They can form clays able to hold many minerals within them. The weathering of rocks by leaching and oxidising conditions results in the formation of clay-like minerals such as goethite, lepidocrocite, and hematite. Some of them can hold rare earth minerals as well as iron, nickel and the alumina for which it is often mined. Laterite results from the weathering of basalt. It can make a stable basis for construction since it solidifies into rock when exposed to air. However, its low fertility makes it unsuitable for agricultural use.

=== Monazite ===
Monazite is a waxy mineral that is formed through the crystallization of igneous rocks and the metamorphism of clastic sedimentary rocks. This mineral is typically mined in placer deposits, with gold commonly found as a byproduct. Monazite contains many rare metals such as neodymium, cerium, lanthanum, praseodymium, and samarium, making it a critical material for renewable energy devices. Monazite sand and deposits for mining are found in India, Brazil, and Australia.

=== Loparite ===
Loparite is a mineral that is mined for the three rare (but not rare earth) elements: titanium, niobium, and tantalum it contains. Major Loparite deposits can be found in Russia and Paraguay, and although it is present in other countries such as Canada, Norway, Greenland, and Brazil, Russia remains the primary source for mining this mineral. The elements in loparite make it useful for conductivity, aircraft assembly, and as a radioactive tracer.

== Uses ==
These elements have a wide range of uses, from everyday items to military technologies. They are also used in electric vehicles.

== See also ==
- Mineral separation plant
