= Helium production in the United States =

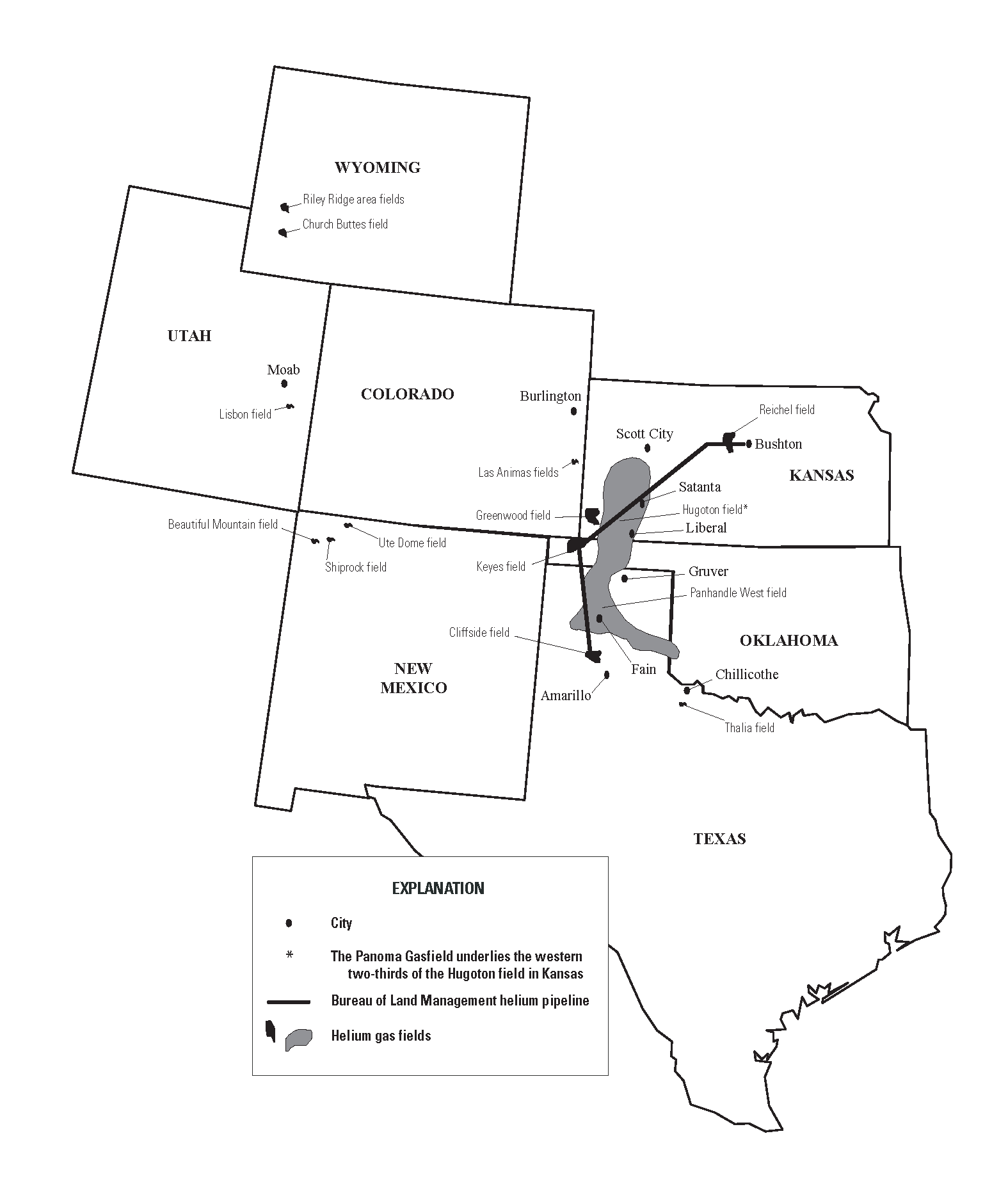
Map showing helium-rich gas fields and helium processing plants in the United States, 2012. From USGS.

Helium production in the United States totaled 73 million cubic meters in 2014. The US was the world's largest helium producer, providing 40 percent of world supply. In addition, the US federal government sold 30 million cubic meters from storage. Other major helium producers were Algeria and Qatar.

All commercial helium is recovered from natural gas. Helium usually makes up a minuscule portion of natural gas, but can make up as much as 10 percent of natural gas in some fields. A helium content of 0.3 percent or more is considered necessary for commercial helium extraction. In 2012, helium was recovered at 16 extraction plants, from gas wells in Colorado, Kansas, Oklahoma, Texas, and Wyoming. One extraction plant in Utah was idle in 2012.

== History ==
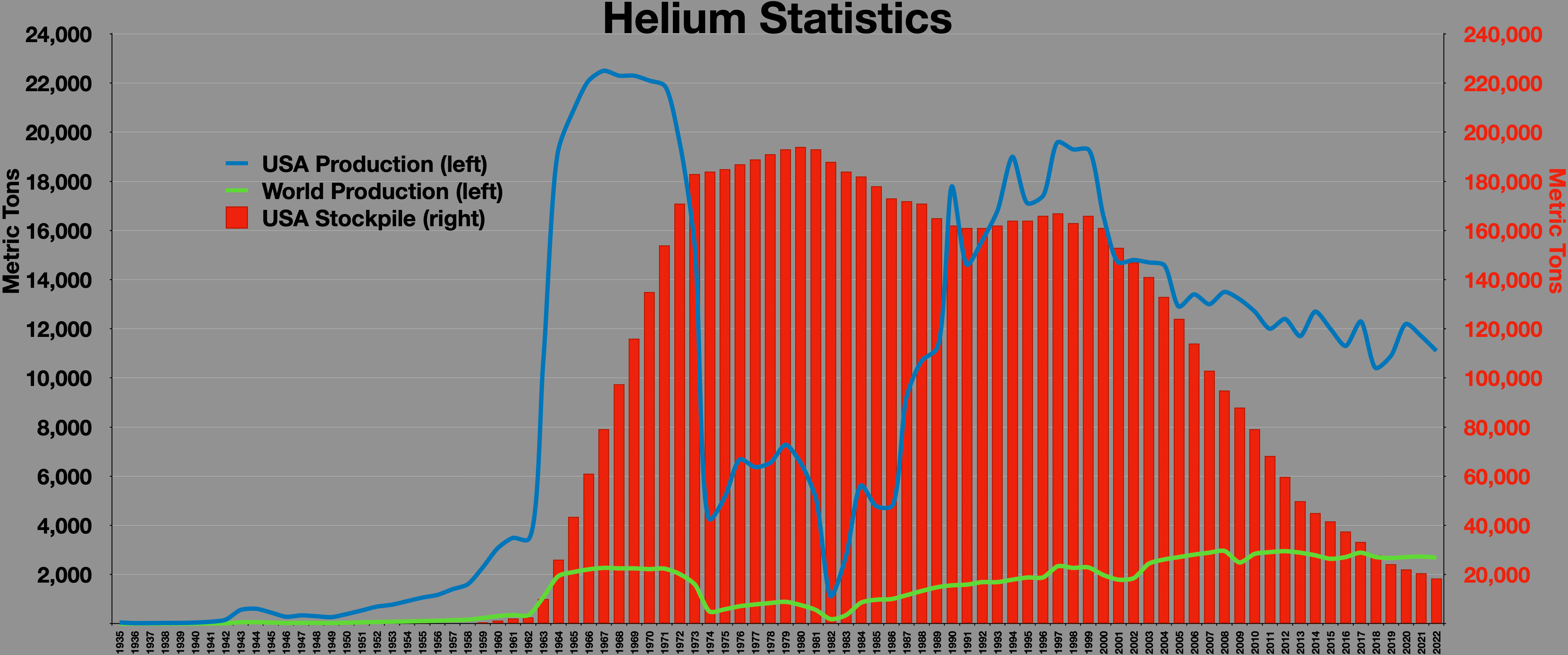
Helium production United States production (left) World production (left) United States stockpiles (right)

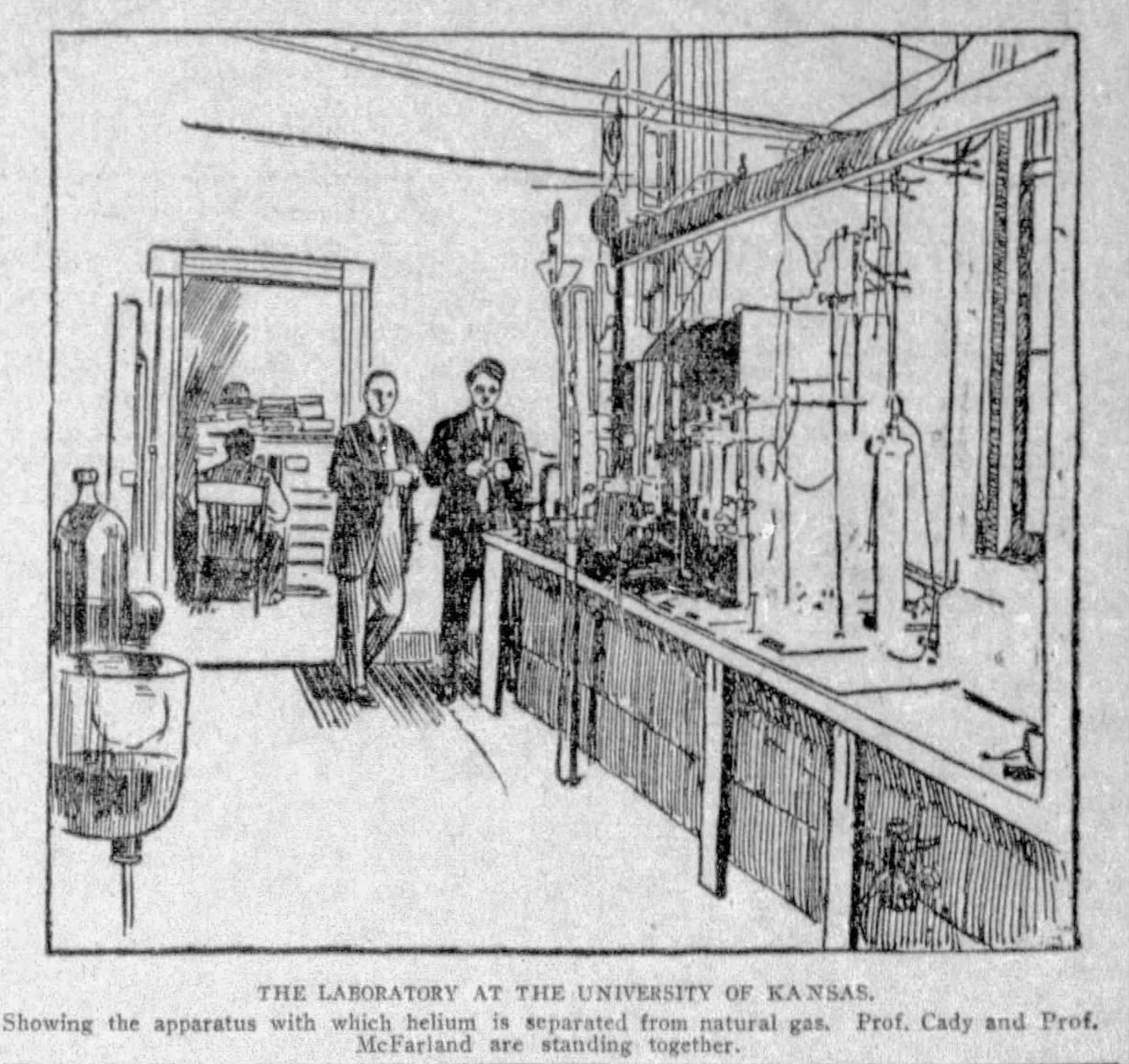
Kansas City Star coverage of Cady and McFarland's experiments at the University of Kansas

In 1903, an oil exploration well at Dexter, Kansas, produced a gas that would not burn. Kansas state geologist Erasmus Haworth took samples of the gas back to the University of Kansas at Lawrence where chemists Hamilton Cady and David McFarland discovered that gas contained 1.84 percent helium. This led to further discoveries of helium-bearing natural gas in Kansas.

The military was interested in helium for balloons and dirigibles. The US Army built the first helium-extraction plant in 1915 at Petrolia, Texas, where a large natural gas field averaged nearly 1 percent helium. The United States Navy established three experimental helium plants during World War I, to recover enough helium to supply barrage balloons with the non-flammable, lighter-than-air gas. Two of the experimental plants were north of Fort Worth, Texas, and recovered helium from natural gas piped in from the Petrolia oil field in Clay County, Texas.

The Mineral Leasing Act of 1920, which provided for oil and gas leasing on federal land, reserved all helium contained in natural gas on federal land to the government. This was followed by the Helium Act of 1925, which banned the export of helium, "a mineral resource pertaining to the national defense". However, after the loss of the USS Akron in 1933 and the USS Macon in 1935, military use of helium declined significantly. A lease agreement was reached in 1936 with the Goodyear–Zeppelin Corporation, providing helium for commercial aviation, and in 1937 Congress amended the Helium Act to allow for sale of helium produced in excess of U.S. governmental needs. The biggest potential customer, however, was Nazi Germany, which wanted to replace the hydrogen responsible for the Hindenburg disaster with non-flammable helium. A contract for 18 million cubic feet (510,000 m^{3}) of helium was approved, but Secretary of the Interior Harold Ickes blocked export of the gas due to its potential for military use.

During World War II, military demand for helium rose, so the federal government built a number of new helium-extraction plants. One such plant was at Shiprock, New Mexico, to recover helium from gas at the Rattlesnake Field. Gas from the Rattlesnake field, like that of a number of other fields in the Four Corners area, contained mostly nitrogen and very little hydrocarbons, and was produced exclusively for the helium.

The Helium Acts Amendments of 1960 (Pub. L. 86–777) empowered the U.S. Bureau of Mines to arrange for five private plants to recover helium from natural gas. The Bureau also built a 425-mile (684 km) pipeline from Bushton, Kansas, to connect those plants with the government's partially depleted Cliffside gas field, near Amarillo, Texas. The crude helium (50 to 80 percent helium) was injected and stored in the Cliffside gas field until needed, when it then was further purified.

By 1995, a billion cubic meters of the gas had been stored, but the reserve was US$1.4 billion in debt, prompting the Congress of the United States in 1996 to phase out the reserve. The resulting Helium Privatization Act of 1996 (Public Law 104–273) directed the United States Department of the Interior to empty the reserve. Sales to government and government contractors began in 1998. Sales to the open market began in 2003. The sales program paid the indebtedness, and ended in 2024.

== Geology ==
All commercial production of helium comes from natural gas. There are two basic types of commercial helium deposits: natural gas produced primarily for the hydrocarbon content, typically containing less than 3 percent helium, and gas with little or no hydrocarbons, produced solely for the helium, which typically makes up between 5 and 10 percent of the gas. Although natural gas in which helium is only a byproduct contains a much lower percentage of helium, historically it has supplied the most helium.

Most geologists believe that the majority of helium in natural gas derives from radioactive decay of uranium and thorium, either from radioactive black shales, or granitoid basement rock. Granite and related rocks tend to contain more uranium and thorium than other rock types. However, some believe that the helium is largely primordial.

Unusual geological conditions are considered necessary for commercial concentrations of helium in natural gas. Helium accumulations are commonly in structural closures overlying bedrock highs. Faults, fractures, and igneous intrusives are regarded by some geologists as important pathways for helium to migrate upward into the sedimentary section. The atomic radius of helium is so small that shale, which is effective in trapping methane, allows the helium to migrate upward through the shale pores. Nonporous caprock such as halite (rock salt) or anhydrite is more effective in trapping helium. Helium deposits occur mostly in Paleozoic rocks.

High helium content of natural gas is accompanied by high contents of nitrogen and carbon dioxide. The percentage of nitrogen is usually 10 to 20 times that of helium, so that natural gas with 5 percent or more helium may have little or no methane. A representative sample from the Pinta Dome in Apache County, Arizona, for instance, has 8.3 percent helium, 89.9 percent nitrogen, 1 percent carbon dioxide, and only 0.1 percent methane. In such cases, the gas is produced solely for its helium content.

In the early 20th century, the highest production and largest known reserves of helium were in the gases produced for their hydrocarbon content. The most important of these were the Hugoton, Panhandle, Greenwood, and Keyes fields, all located in western Kansas, and the panhandles of Oklahoma and Texas. The Hugoton and Panhandle fields are particularly large, covering thousands of square miles. The helium content of the gas varies greatly within some fields. In the Panhandle field, helium content is highest, up to 1.3 percent or more, along the updip southwest edge, and lowest, 0.1 percent, along the northeast edge.

By 2003, the natural gas fields of the Great Plains of Colorado, Kansas, Oklahoma, and Texas, still held important reserves, but out of the 100 billion cubic feet (2.8 billion cubic meters) of total measured helium reserves in the US, 61 billion cubic feet (1.7 billion cubic meters) was contained in the Riley Ridge field of western Wyoming, a gas deposit produced for its carbon dioxide content.

The Four Corners area of the southwest US has a number of gas fields containing 5 to 10 percent helium and large percentages of nitrogen, with little or no hydrocarbons. The fields are associated with igneous intrusions. One field, Dineh-bi-Keyah in Arizona, produced oil from a fractured sill. The other fields have no associated oil.

Helium-rich gas fields in the United States

State	Field	Formation	Age	Percent Helium
Arizona	Dineh-bi-Keyah	McKracken Sandstone	Pennsylvanian, Devonian	4.8 to 5.6
Arizona	Pinta Dome	Coconino Sandstone	Permian	5.6 to 9.8
Colorado	Model Dome	Lyons Sandstone	Permian	6.7 to 8.3
Kansas	Greenwood	Topeka Limestone, Kansas City Group	Pennsylvanian	0.4 to 0.7
Kansas	Otis-Albert	Reagan Sandstone	Cambrian	1.2 to 2.3
Kansas	Ryersee	Chase Group	Permian	1.4
Kansas, Oklahoma, Texas	Hugoton	various	Permian	0.3 to 1.9
New Mexico	Hogback	Hermosa Formation	Pennsylvanian	1.4 to 8.0
New Mexico	Rattlesnake	Leadville Limestone, Ouray Limestone	Mississippian, Devonian	7.5 to 8.0
Oklahoma	Keyes	Morrow (Keyes) Sandstone	Pennsylvanian	0.3 to 2.7
Texas	Cliffside	various	Permian	1.7 to 1.8
Texas	Panhandle	various	Permian	0.1 to 2.2
Texas	Petrolia	Cisco Sandstone	Pennsylvanian	0.65 to 1.14
Utah	Harley Dome	Entrada Sandstone	Jurassic	7
Wyoming	Riley Ridge	Madison Limestone	Mississippian	
If not otherwise cited, source is:

== Processing ==
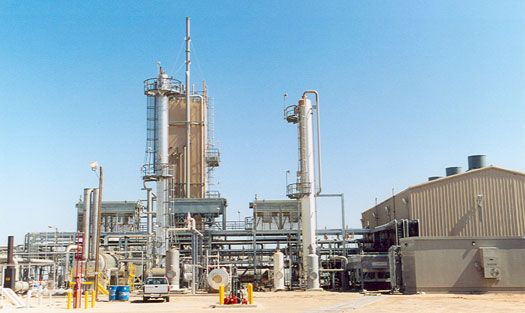
The Crude Helium Enrichment Unit in the Cliffside Gas Field.

Helium is marketed in two specifications: crude helium, which typically contains 75 to 80 percent helium, and Grade A helium, which is 99.995 percent pure.

== Storage ==
A large volume of helium was stored underground in the Cliffside field in the decade following the Helium Act Amendments of 1960. In recent years, the reserve has been systematically selling its helium. As of 2012, the United States National Helium Reserve still accounted for 30 percent of the world's helium. The reserve was expected to run out of helium in 2018.

As of 1 October 2023, the US government was listed as storing 1,855,115 thousand cubic feet (52,531.0 thousand cubic meters) of federally owned helium, and 1,491,079 thousand cubic feet (42,222.7 thousand cubic meters) of privately owned helium.

== Trade ==
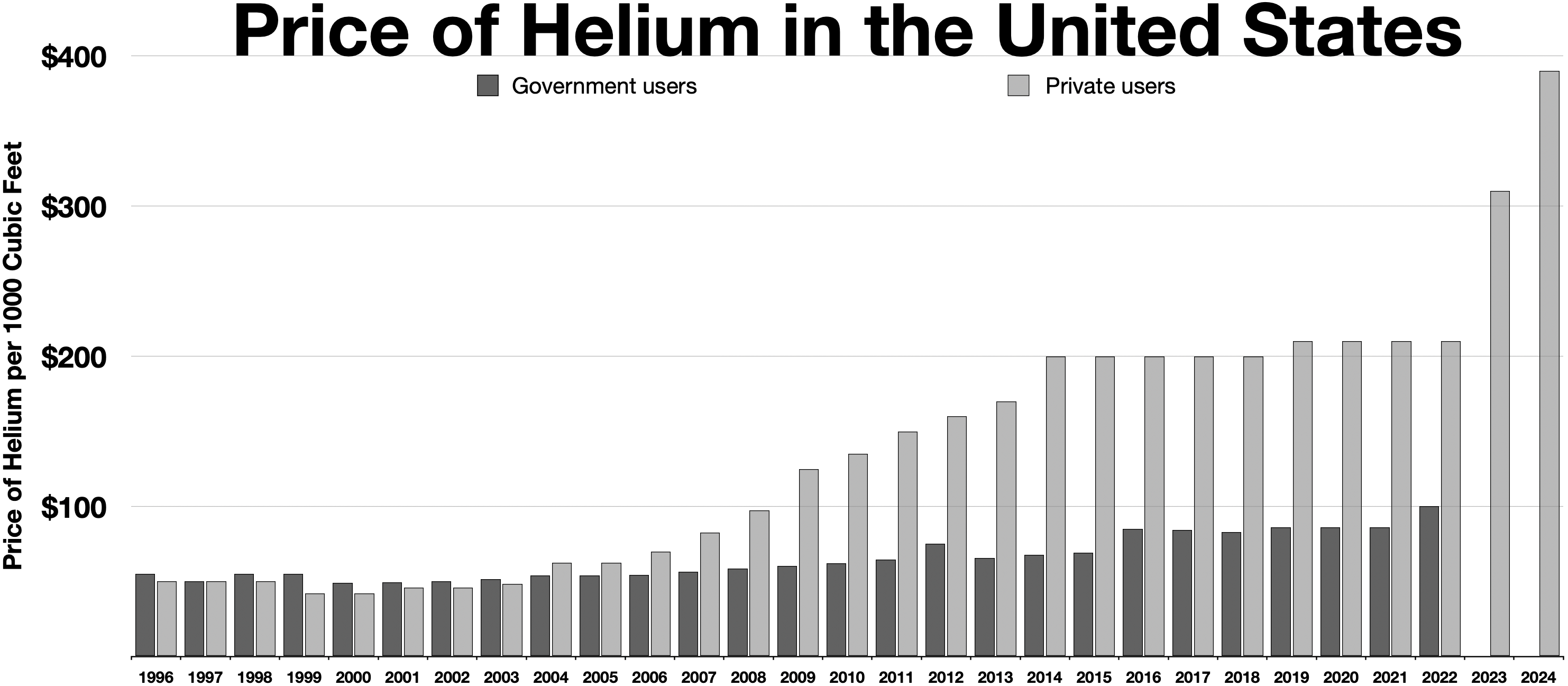
Price of helium per 1000 cubic feet

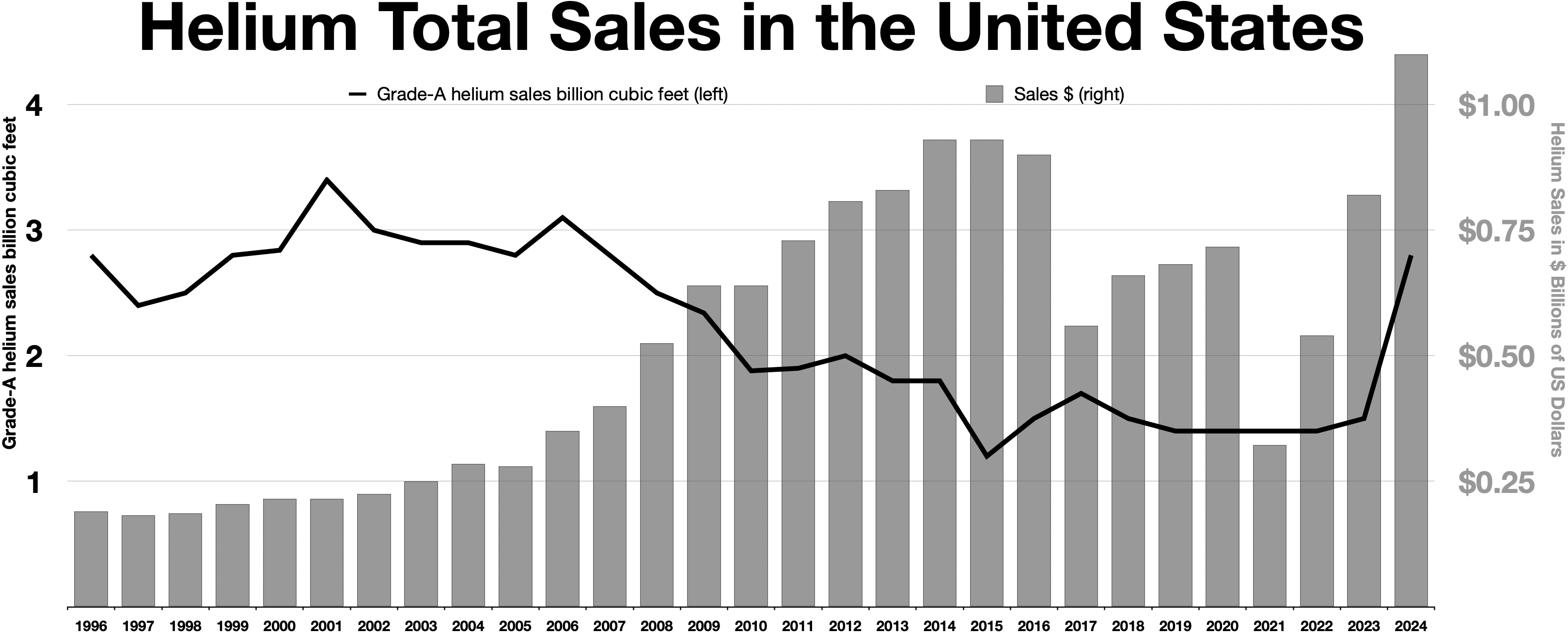
Helium sales in the United States by volume and total dollars

The United States is a major exporter of helium.

For many years the United States produced more than 90% of the commercial helium in the world. In the mid-1990s, a new plant in Arzew, Algeria, began producing 17×10^{6} cubic metres (6.0×10^{8} cu ft), enough to supply all of Europe's demand. In 2004–2006, two additional plants, one in Ras Laffan, Qatar, and the other in Skikda, Algeria, were built, and Algeria became the second-leading producer of helium.

In August 2014, the Bureau of Land Management auctioned crude helium from the national reserve at an average price of US$104 per thousand cubic feet of helium content. Grade A helium sold for about $200 per thousand cubic feet, or $7.21 per cubic meter in 2014. By 2024, all helium belonging to the reserve had been sold.

== See also ==
- Commonwealth Fusion Systems – fusion power plant to be built in the 2030s in Virginia that will produce helium as a byproduct
