= Petrolia Oil Field (Texas) =

Oil field in Clay County, Texas, U.S.

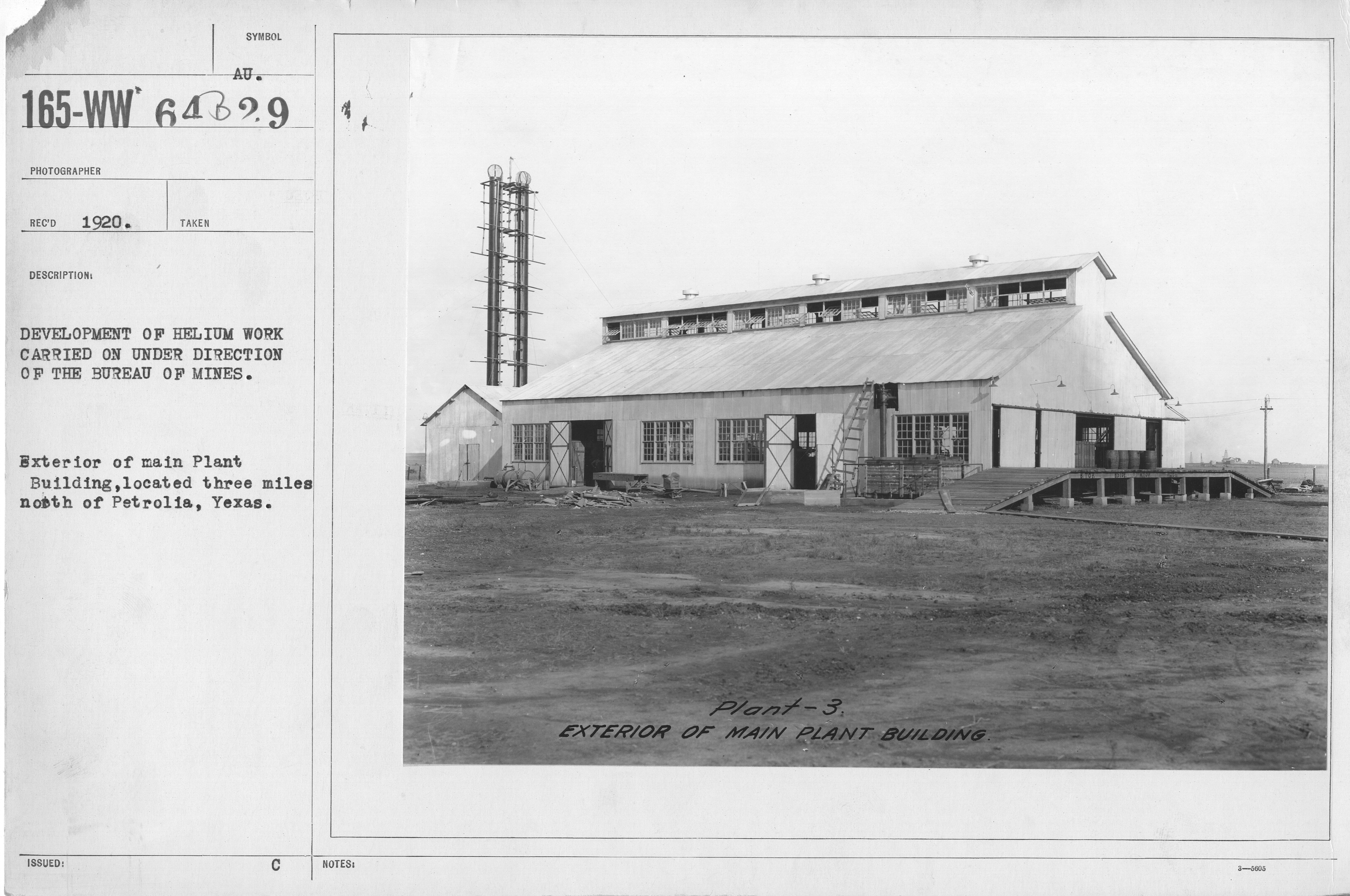
- Main plant process building which was located 3 miles (4.8 km) north of Petrolia, Texas

- Location within Texas Location within the United States
- Country: USA
- Region: Bend Arch–Fort Worth Basin
- Location: Clay County, Texas
- Offshore/onshore: Onshore
- Coordinates: 33°58′41″N 98°15′48″W
- Operators: Lone Star Gas Company

Field history
- Discovery: 1904
- Start of development: 1908
- Start of production: December 17, 1910
- Peak year: 1914
- Abandonment: 1921

Production
- Current production of oil: 700 barrels per day (~35,000 t/a)
- Year of current production of oil: 1910
- Peak of production (oil): 550,585 barrels per day (~2.744×10^{7} t/a)
- Producing formations: Pennsylvanian; Petrolia Formation

Petrolia Oil Field is a North Texas segment of land located in Clay County, Texas and the Great Plains. The hydrocarbon exploration site was geographically within 10 miles (16 km) of the Red River of the South. The oil and gas reservoir was located between Texas State Highway 79 and Texas State Highway 148 converging at Petrolia, Texas.

The sandstone geology was discovered in 1904 as having deposits of fossil fuels. On December 17, 1910, a crude oil deposit was struck at 1,600 feet (490 m). The Dorthulia Dunn No. One blowout produced 700 barrels per day (~95 t/d). The Clay County oil reservoir reached peak production in 1914 yielding 550,000 barrels per day (~75,000 t/d).

By 1915, the oil field had received national recognition as the first natural gas reservoir producing a light non-flammable inert gas known as helium. The Petrolia sandstone plain was the premier producer of helium culminating in the United States Bureau of Mines and United States Department of War constructing a helium extraction plant near Petrolia, Texas.

== Global Helium Demand and World War I ==
The North Texas noble gas production site served as the primary helium source for the United States during the 1910s and World War I. The Great War created a supply and demand economic model as charged by Allies of World War I necessitating the demand for lifting gas. The upthrust gas leveraged the commitment for a counter-offensive deterrent in Europe opposing the Zeppelin raids as executed by the German strategic bombing during World War I.

== United States Helium Production Plant No. 1 ==
On October 22, 1918, the United States government entered an agreement with Linde Air Products Company for the construction and operations of a helium processing plant located northwest of Fort Worth, Texas. The Bureau of Yards and Docks served as the architect for the structural design of the buildings and facilities housing the helium production operations.

The cryogenic fuel facility resided in the north Fort Worth rural area of Blue Mound, Texas. The industrial superfluidity gas site was located at the intersection of Farm to Market Road 156 and Meacham Boulevard bearing east of Fort Worth Meacham International Airport.

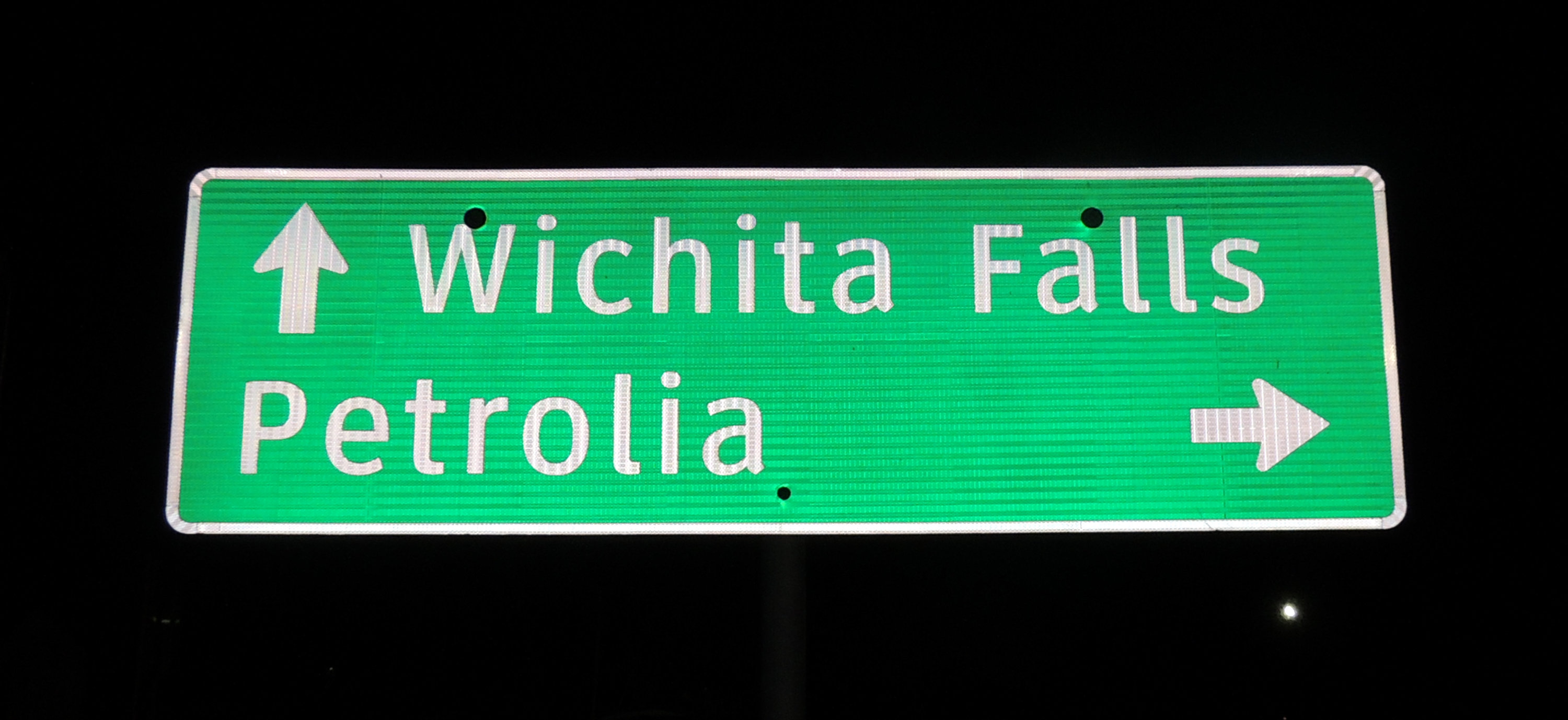
Petrolia road sign in Henrietta, TX

The plant collected natural gas by a pipeline transport routed 90 miles (140 km) from the Lone Star Gas Petrolia compression station bearing 12 miles (19 km) north of Henrietta, Texas and 18 miles (29 km) northeast of Wichita Falls, Texas. In April 1921, the Fort Worth natural gas processing plant began production operations sustaining production yields for nine years.

In the early 1920s, the United States Navy constructed a dirigible balloon mooring station within 5 miles (8.0 km) of the Fort Worth helium plant. During 1924 to 1929, Fort Worth served as a service site for airships completing transcontinental flights.

On January 10, 1929, the United States Helium Production Plant No. 1 ceased operations in Fort Worth transitioning the helium production to the Amarillo helium plant.

== Exhaustion of the Petrolia Reservoir ==
Upon the lapse of federal appropriations and gas depletion of the fossil fuel reservoir production yield, the Petrolia helium plant sustained the non-reactive gas processing of the monatomic gas from 1915 to 1921.

== Reservoir in Texas Panhandle ==
The Cliffside Gas Field is located 15 miles (24 km) northwest of Amarillo, Texas. The Cliffside natural gas reservoir became the preeminent helium source for the United States after the cessation of the North Texas gas field in the 1920s.

== 1904–1910 photographs ==
Pictorial articles are provided by the Clay County Historical Society.

- "Cable Tool Drilling Ridge - Petrolia Oil Field". The Portal to Texas History. Clay County Historical Society. 1904.
- "Lone Star Gas Pipe - Henrietta, Texas Railroad Station". The Portal to Texas History. Clay County Historical Society. 1908.
- "Tractors and Horses Working a Field - Petrolia, Texas". The Portal to Texas History. Clay County Historical Society. 1910.
- "Lone Star Gas Employees - Petrolia, Texas". The Portal to Texas History. Clay County Historical Society. 1910.
- "Petrolia to Forth Worth Pipe Line - Lone Star Gas Company". The Portal to Texas History. Clay County Historical Society. 1910.
- "Petrolia to Forth Worth Pipe Line - Lone Star Gas Company". The Portal to Texas History. Clay County Historical Society. 1910.
- "Combustion of Petrolia Mitchell-Jones Well". The Portal to Texas History. Clay County Historical Society. 1910.
- "Lone Star Gas Truck - Petrolia, Texas". The Portal to Texas History. Clay County Historical Society. 1910.
- "Petrolia, Texas Oil Depot". The Portal to Texas History. Clay County Historical Society. 1910.

== Pictorial biography ==
Helium Production for United States National Security

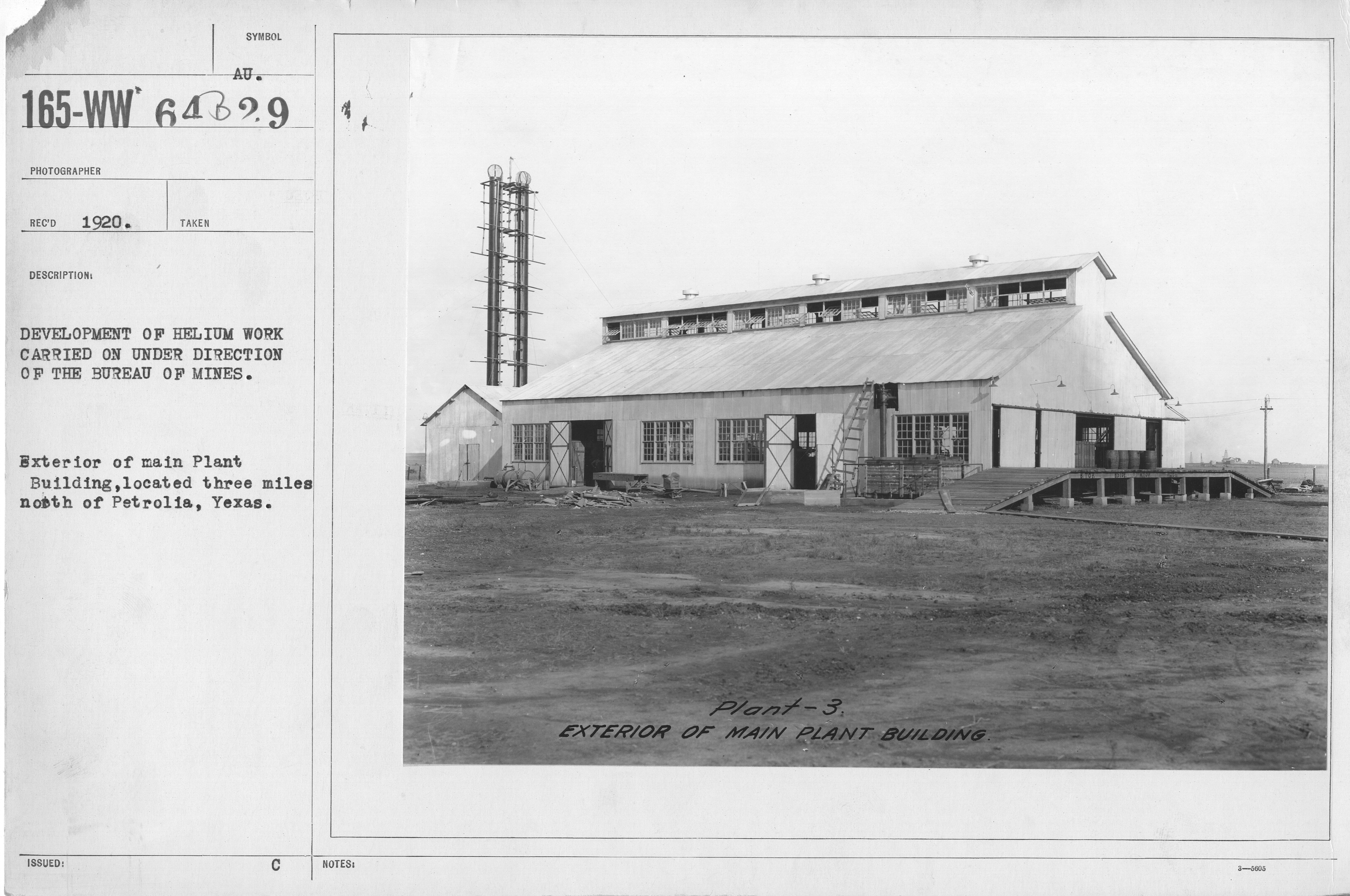
Early 1900s industrial gas processing plant with natural ventilation accompanied with a ridge ventilator

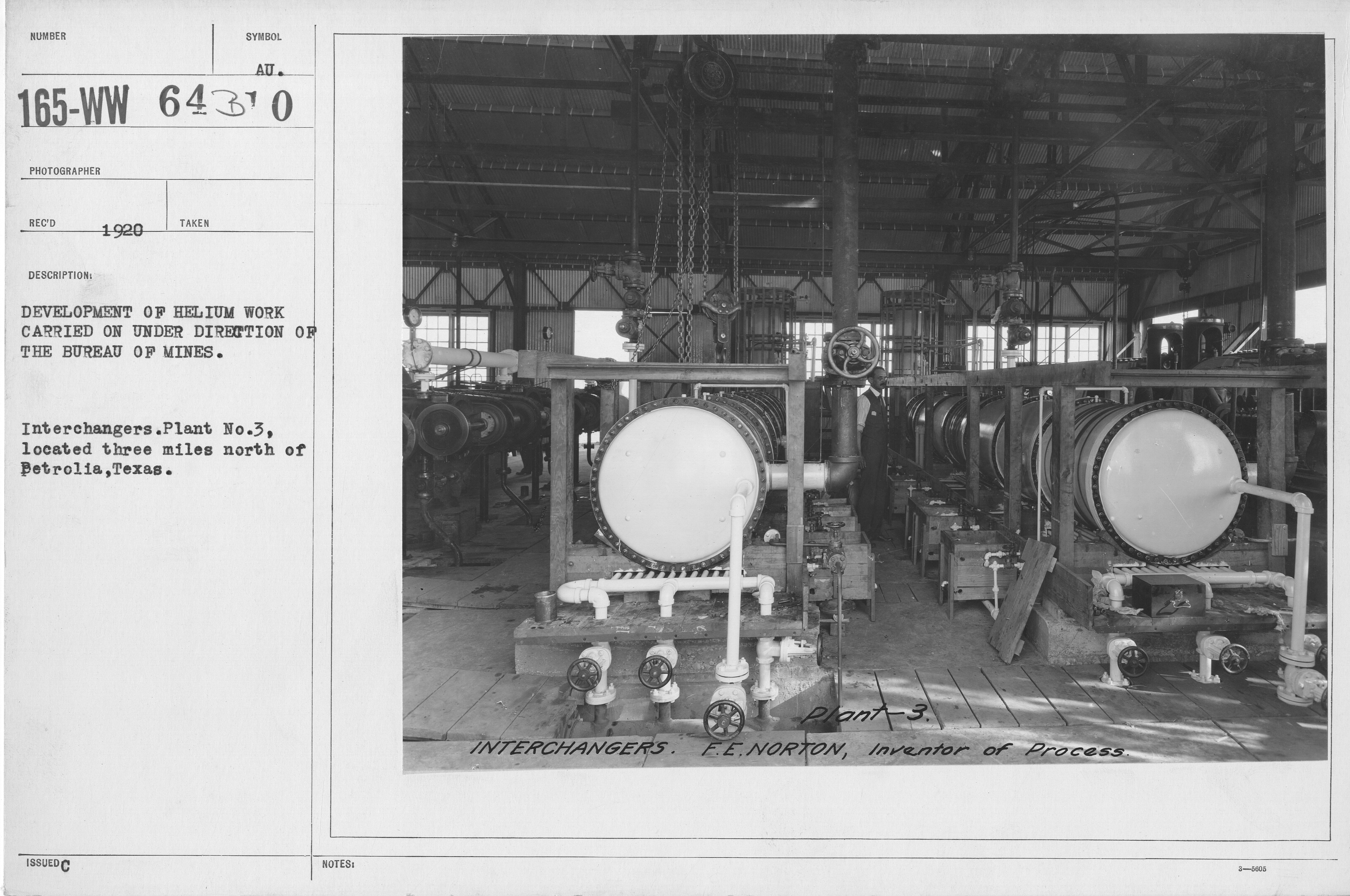
Natural gas interchangers (circa. 1920)

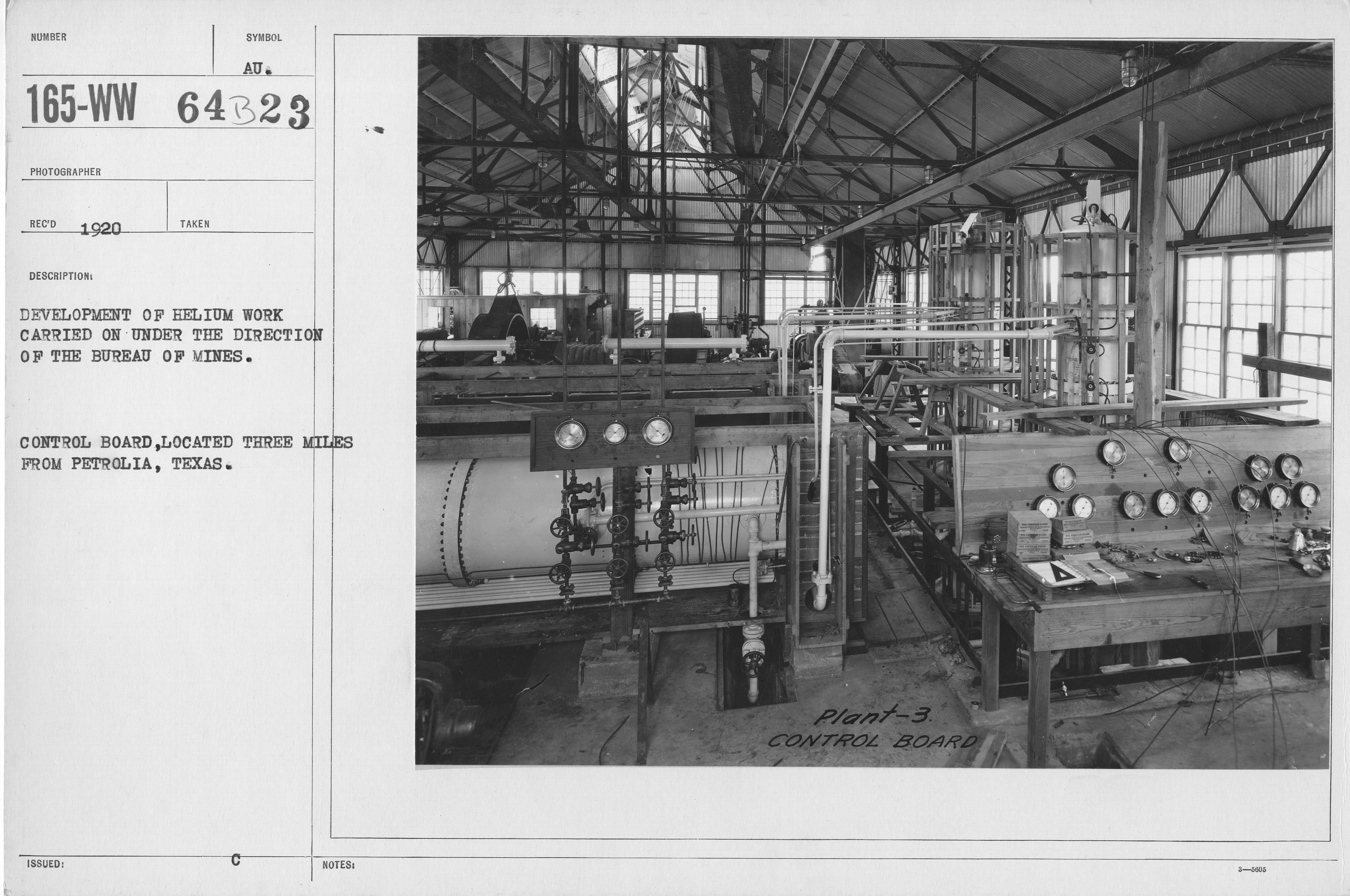
Controller panel for natural gas interchangers (circa. 1920)

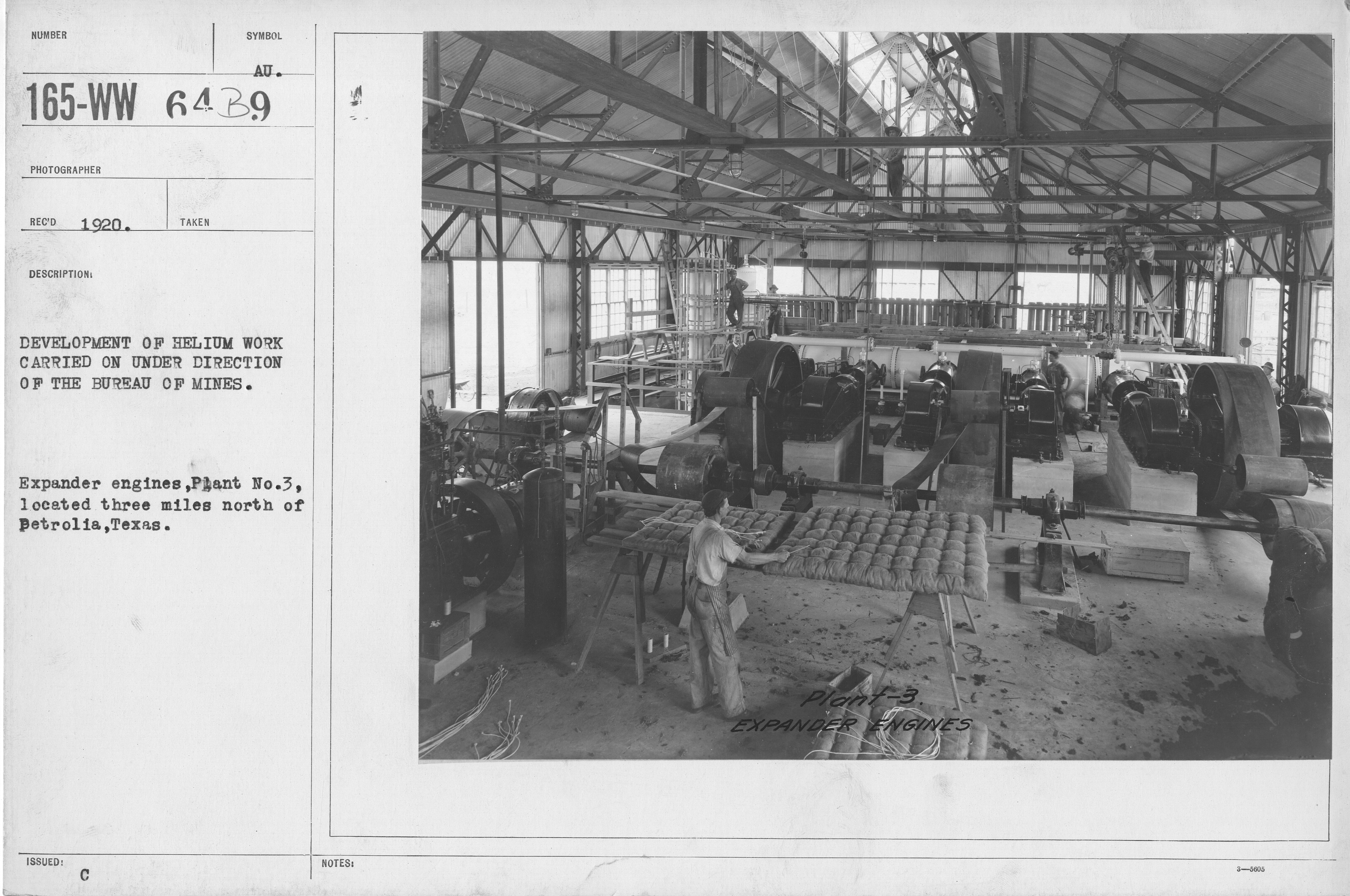
Natural gas expander engines (circa. 1920)

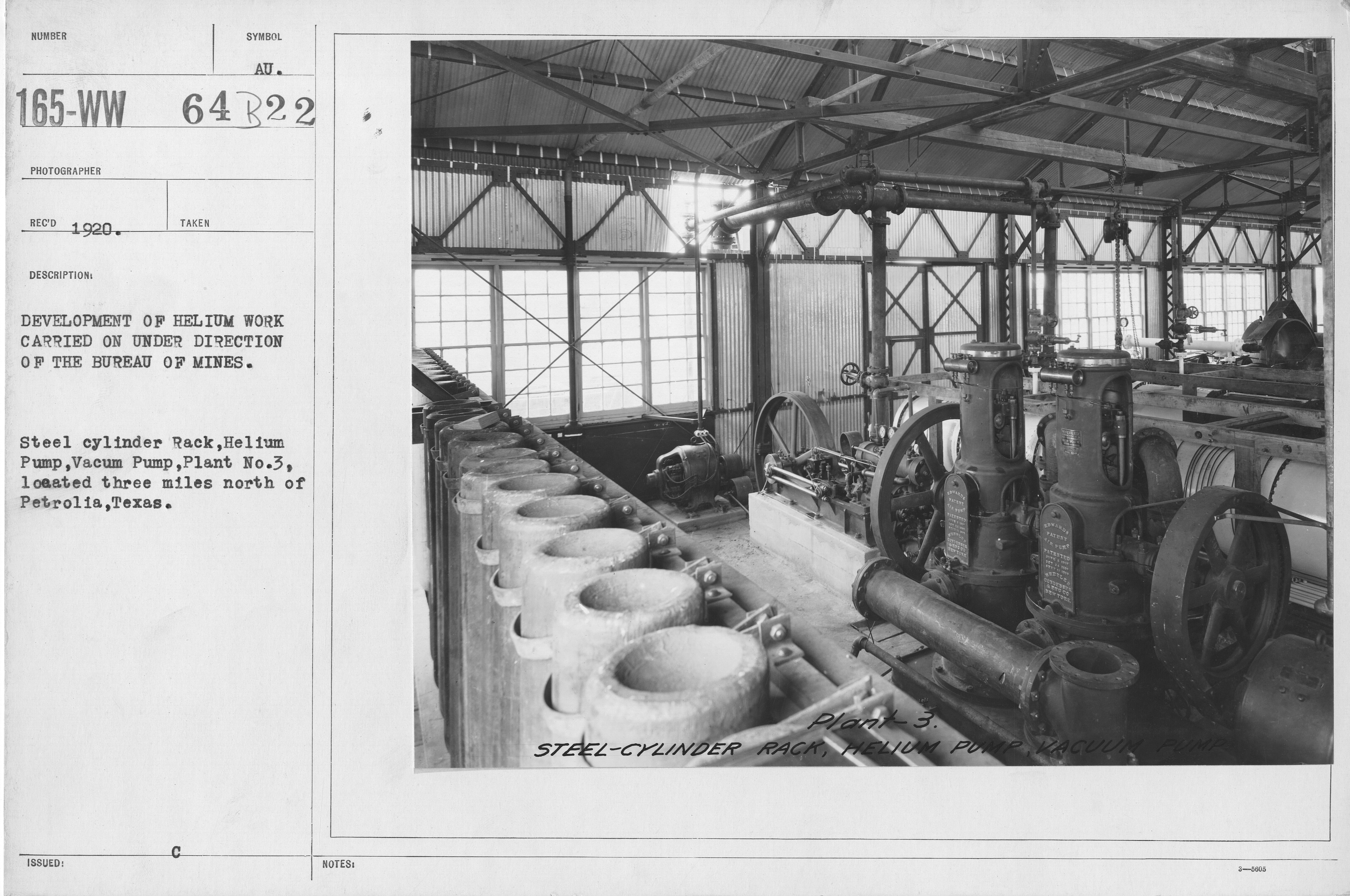
Vacuum pumps for natural gas processing (circa. 1920)

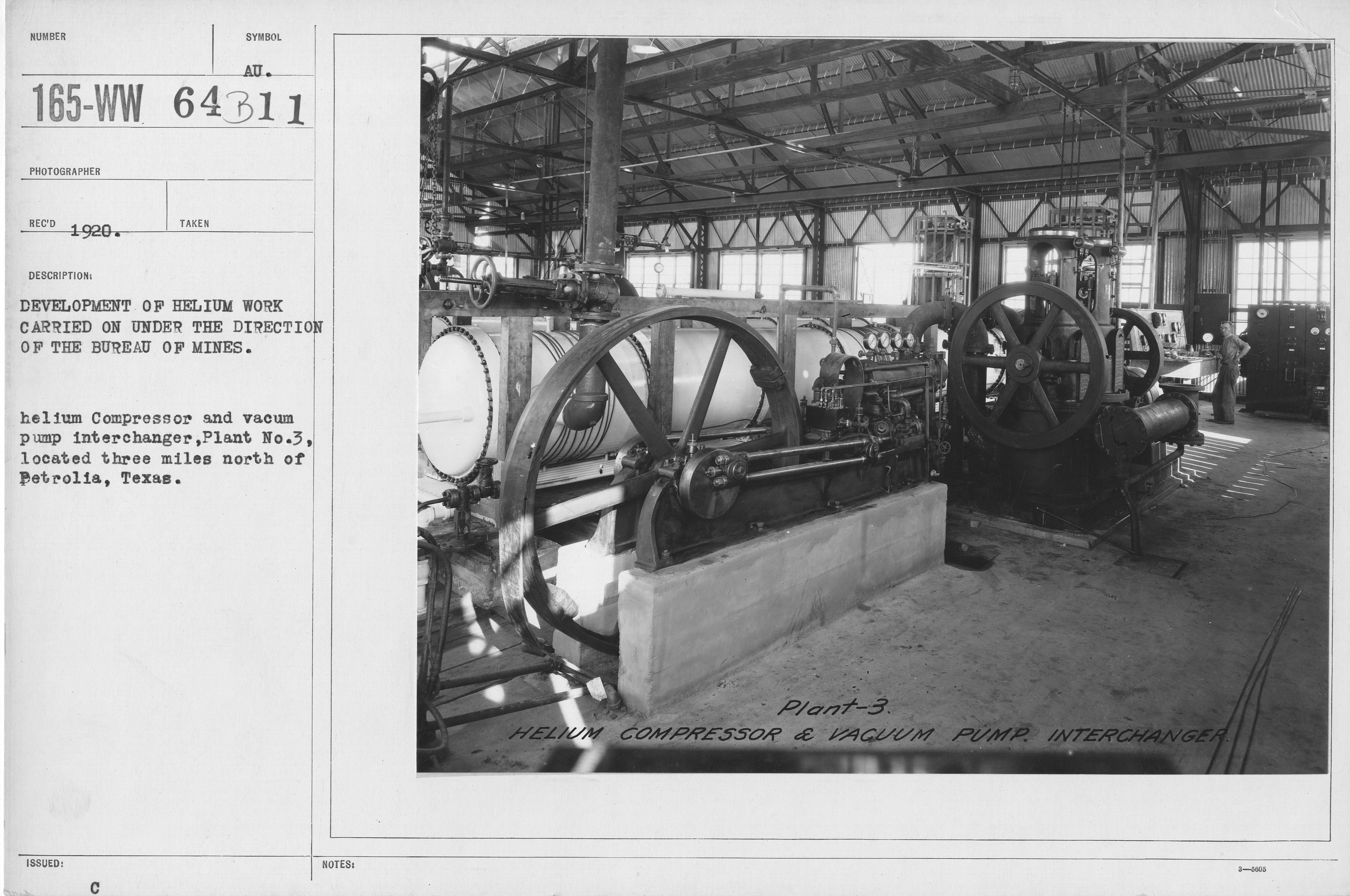
Compressor and vacuum pump for natural gas processing (circa. 1920)

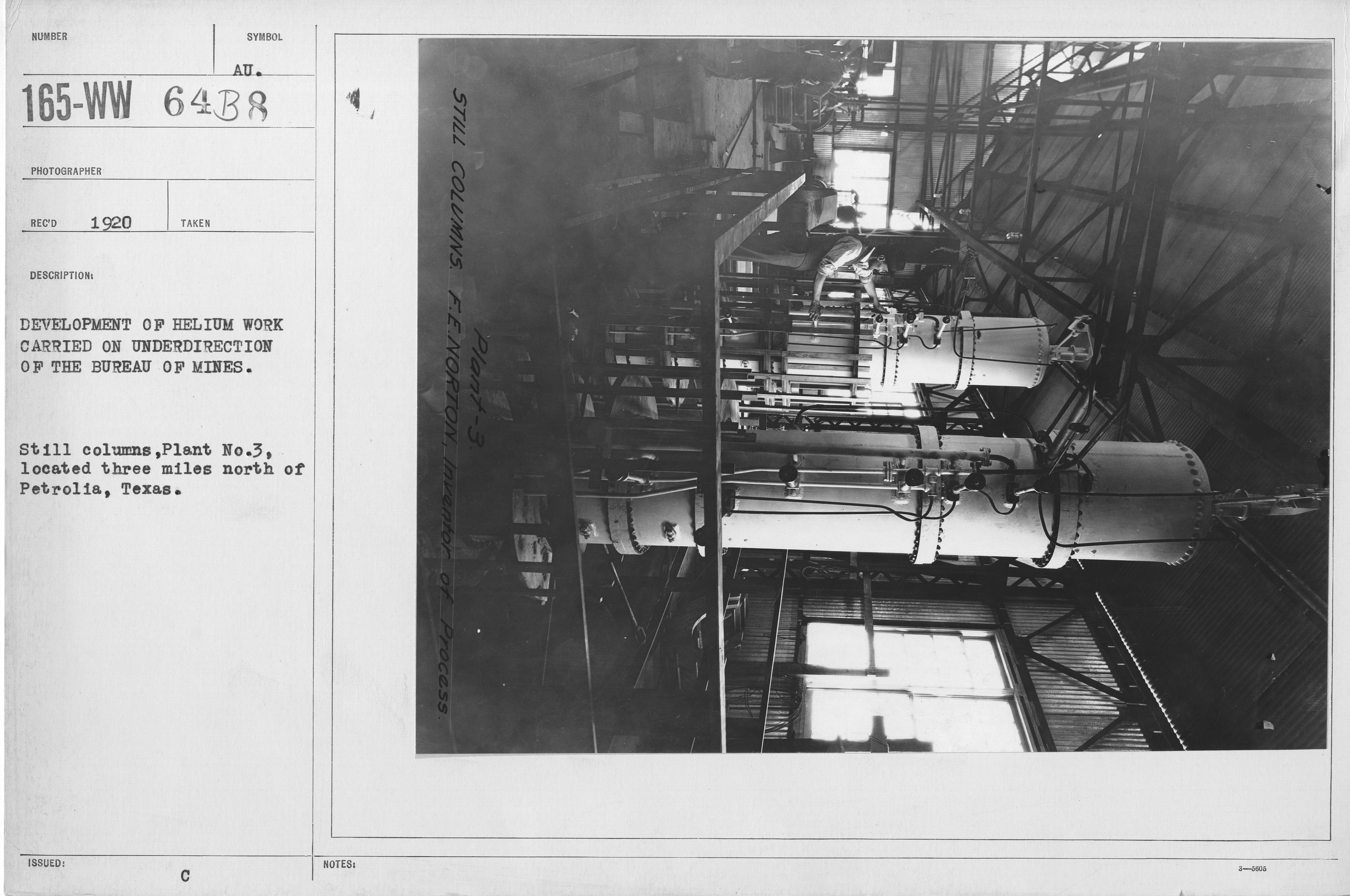
Fractionating columns for natural gas processing (circa. 1920)

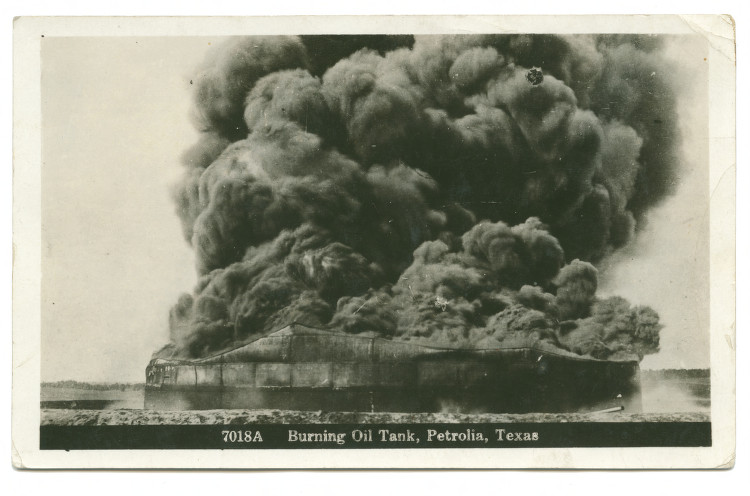
Combustion of Petrolia oil field depot tanks (circa. 1919)

== See also ==
Air separation	List of airship accidents
Cryocooler	National Helium Reserve
Hampson–Linde cycle	Non-rigid airship
Helium Act of 1925	Rigid airship
Hugoton Gas Field	Semi-rigid airship

Applications of Balloons

Aerostat	History of military ballooning
Balloon (aeronautics)	Incendiary balloon
Barrage balloon	Kite balloon
Gas balloon	Observation balloon
High-altitude balloon	Research balloon
History of ballooning	Tethered balloon

Monatomic Gas Scientists of Standards Development Era

John F. Allen	Pyotr Kapitsa
Hamilton Cady	Carl von Linde
Samuel Collins	Heike Kamerlingh Onnes
Arthur Eddington	William Ramsay
William Hampson	Ernest Rutherford

== Historical Video Archive ==
- Rudnick, Isidore (1977). "The Unusual Properties of Liquid Helium". Internet Archive. San Francisco Film Services.
- Fort Worth's Secret WWI Helium Production Plant on YouTube
