= Helium Act of 1925 =

United States statute

- Long title: An Act authorizing the conservation, production, and exploitation of helium gas, a mineral resource pertaining to the national defense, and to the development of commercial aeronautics, and for other purposes.
- Nicknames: Helium Conservation Act of 1925
- Enacted by: the 68th United States Congress
- Effective: March 3, 1925

Citations
- Public law: Pub. L. 68–544
- Statutes at Large: 43 Stat. 1110

Codification
- Titles amended: 50 U.S.C.: War and National Defense
- U.S.C. sections created: 50 U.S.C. ch. 10 § 161 et seq.

Legislative history
- Introduced in the House as H.R. 5722 by Julius Kahn (R-CA) on May 2, 1924; Committee consideration by House Military Affairs; Passed the House on January 21, 1925 (Passed); Passed the Senate on February 18, 1925 (Passed); Reported by the joint conference committee on February 19, 1925; agreed to by the Senate on February 26, 1925 (Agreed) and by the House on February 28, 1925 (Agreed); Signed into law by President Calvin Coolidge on March 3, 1925

Helium Act of 1925 is a United States statute drafted for the purpose of conservation, exploration, and procurement of helium gas. As since amended, it is currently codified beginning at section 167 of Title 50 of the United States Code. The Act of Congress authorized the condemnation, lease, or purchase of acquired lands bearing the potential of producing helium gas. It banned the export of helium, for which the US was the only important source, thus forcing foreign airships to use hydrogen lift gas. The Act empowered the United States Department of the Interior and United States Bureau of Mines with the jurisdiction for the experimentation, production, repurification, and research of the lighter than air gas. The Title 50 codified law provided the authority for the creation of the National Helium Reserve.

== Privatization of Helium Act ==
The 104th United States Congress introduced four introductory bills in pursuit of privatizing the federal helium production and refining efforts of the United States. On October 9, 1996, the Clinton Administration abolished the U.S. Federal Helium Refining Program through the passage of the Helium Privatization Act of 1996.

== See also ==
- Airship
- Lifting gas
- Cliffside Gas Field (Texas)
- Loon LLC
- Don Harrington Discovery Center
- Masterson, Texas
- Helium production in the United States
- Mineral Leasing Act of 1920
- Helium storage and conservation
- Noble gas
- Hindenburg disaster
- Petrolia Oil Field (Texas)
- Hugoton Gas Field
- Shielding gas

== Amendments to 1925 Act ==
U.S. Congressional amendments to the Helium Act of 1925.

U.S. Statutes to Privatize & Sustain U.S. Helium

Enactment Date	Public Law No.	Statute Citation	U.S. Bill No.	U.S. Presidential Administration
March 3, 1927	P.L. 69-758	44 Stat. 1387	H.R. 15344	Calvin Coolidge
September 1, 1937	P.L. 75-411	50 Stat. 885	S. 1567	Franklin D. Roosevelt
July 26, 1954	P.L. 83-527	68 Stat. 530	H.R. 8713	Dwight D. Eisenhower
September 13, 1960	P.L. 86-777	74 Stat. 918	H.R. 10548	Dwight D. Eisenhower
October 9, 1996	P.L. 104-273	110 Stat. 3315	H.R. 4168	William J. Clinton
October 2, 2013	P.L. 113–40	127 Stat. 534	H.R. 527	Barack H. Obama II

== Historical Bibliography ==
- "Amarillo Helium Plant - Potter County ~ Marker Number: 144". Texas Historic Sites Atlas. Texas Historical Commission. 1965.
- Anderson, H. Allen. "Exell Helium Plant". Handbook of Texas Online. Texas State Historical Association.
- Kansas Historical Society. "Gas Well in Dexter". Kansapedia. Kansas Historical Society.
- Anonymous (July 24, 1927). "HELIUM PLANT TO OPEN.; Dexter (Kan.) Field, Called Richest in World, to Supply Airships". The New York Times. p. 2.
- Anonymous (February 26, 1938). "Purchase of Helium Land Completes U.S. Monopoly". The New York Times. p. 4.
- "Helium Time Columns Monument and Museum - Amarillo ~ Marker Number: 2430". Texas Historic Sites Atlas. Texas Historical Commission. 1968.
- Weaver, Bobby D. "Keyes Helium Extraction Facility". Encyclopedia of Oklahoma History and Culture. Oklahoma Historical Society.
- Alsobrook, Adam. "Taking Preservation Lightly: Historic Helium Plants in Texas". Texas Historical Commission.
- Anonymous (October 17, 1961). "Two Big Concerns to Build Helium Plant in Kansas". The New York Times. p. 53.
- Haitch, Richard (January 3, 1982). "Follow-Up on the News; Helium Scare". The New York Times. p. 001033.
