= Cliffside Gas Field (Texas) =

Gas field in Potter County, Texas, US

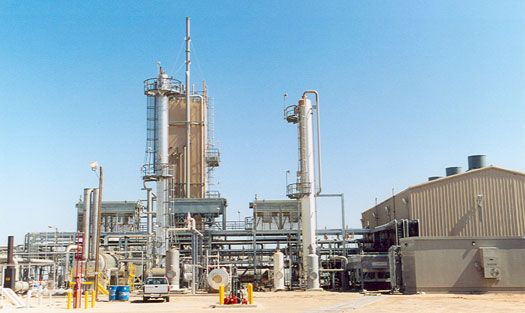
- Helium Enrichment Unit in the Cliffside Gas Field outside Amarillo, Texas

- Location within Texas Location within the United States
- Location: Potter County, Texas
- Offshore/onshore: Onshore
- Coordinates: 35°21′09″N 101°59′31″W

Field history
- Discovery: 1910
- Start of development: May 1925
- Start of production: April 1929

Production
- Producing formations: Caprock Escarpment; Ogallala Formation

Cliffside Gas Field is located in the Texas Panhandle bearing 9 miles (14 km) west of Texas Highway 87 and 15 miles (24 km) northwest of Amarillo, Texas. The Great Plains Panhandle area is located in Potter County, Texas, within the vicinity of the unincorporated community Cliffside, Texas.

The Potter County oil and gas reservoir was permitted for fossil fuel exploration in May 1925. The Panhandle basin was nationally recognized as a helium reserve with an estimated 100 billion cubic feet (2.8 billion cubic metres) of discovered natural gas at the Cliffside field.

== Amarillo Helium Plant ==
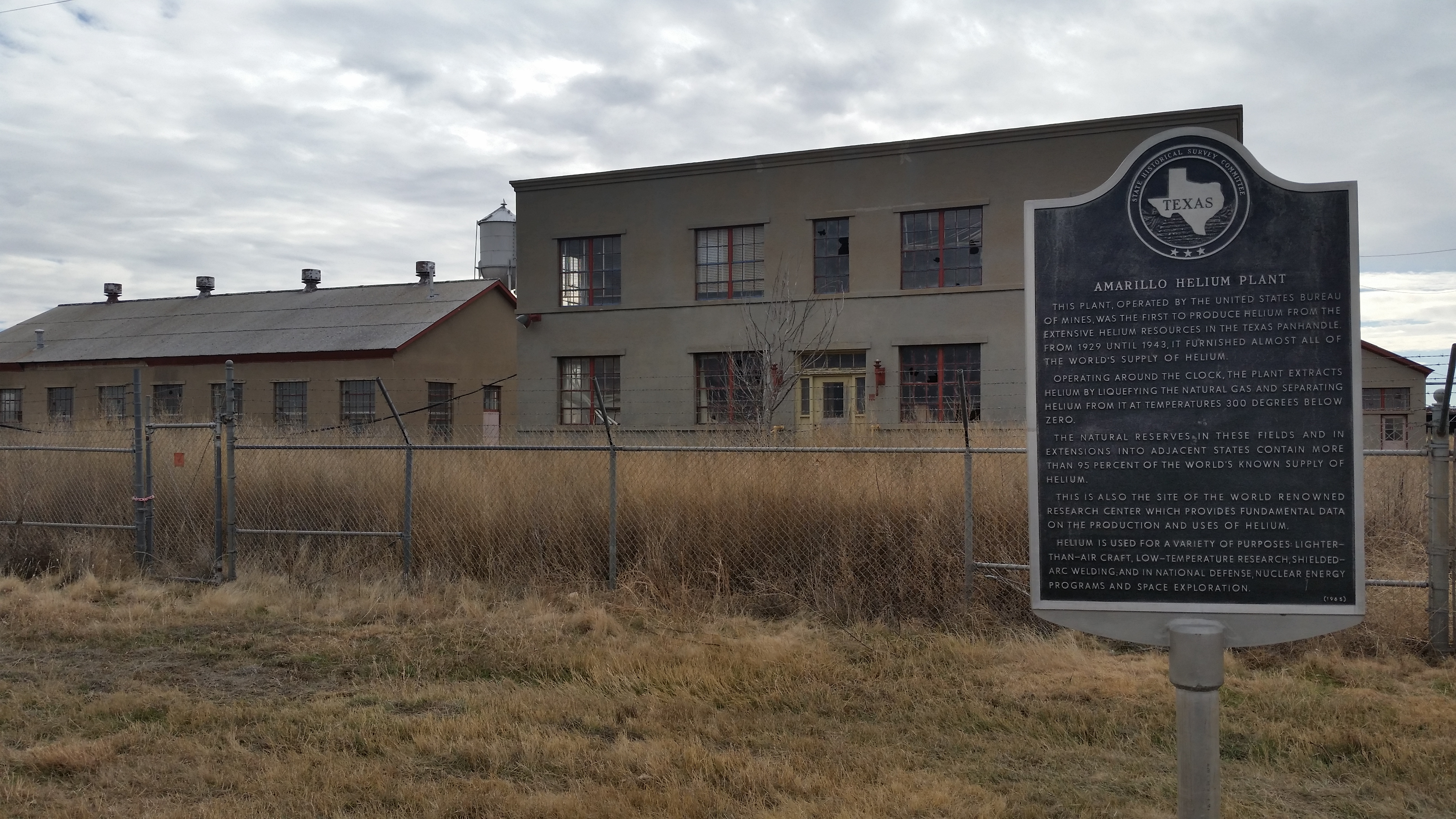
U.S. helium processing plant in Amarillo, Texas

In April 1929, the United States government purchased 50,000 acres (20,000 ha) for a helium extraction plant located in west Amarillo within the unincorporated community of Soncy, Texas.

By August 1929, the Texas Panhandle helium plant received notable commendations from national news sources regarding the plants estimated helium gas production yields.

The Amarillo plant operated from 1929 to 1943 producing helium meeting the global demand for the monatomic gas. In 1968, the helium industry celebrated a centennial claiming Potter County, Texas as the "Helium Capital of the World."

== First Helium Reservoir in North Texas ==
The Petrolia Oil Field was located 18 miles (29 km) northeast of Wichita Falls, Texas. The oil and gas reservoir was the primary helium source for the United States during the 1910s and at the commencement of World War I. By 1921, the North Texas natural gas field was estimated as near gas depletion exceeding the Petrolia helium reserves-to-production ratio yields.

== See also ==
Air separation	National Helium Reserve
Hampson–Linde cycle	Natural-gas processing
Helium Act of 1925	Non-rigid airship
Hugoton Gas Field	Rigid airship
List of airship accidents	Semi-rigid airship

== Historical Video Archive ==
- Rudnick, Isidore (1977). "The Unusual Properties of Liquid Helium". Internet Archive. San Francisco Film Services.
- Exploring Abandoned Amarillo Helium Plant on YouTube
