= Helium storage and conservation =

Maintaining stocks of the noble gas helium

Helium is commercially produced as a byproduct of natural gas extraction. Until the mid-1990s, the United States Bureau of Mines operated a large scale helium storage facility to support government requirements for helium.

The Helium Privatization Act of 1996 and subsequent increased demand for helium has led to market volatility and the entrance of significant new producers. Intermittent shortages or price increases have motivated helium users to find new ways to save on helium consumption. A lack of helium supply can affect researchers and industrial users of helium, and may lead to loss of research materials and equipment.

== Perspectives on helium stocking and conservation ==
As early as 1982, there were discussions from multiple points of view about the possibility of helium shortage. One such point of discussion was to examine the usefulness of helium storage in the United States from an economic perspective. The maximisation of welfare resulting from this finite natural resource was the focal point of people of this school of thought. This economic approach is represented by the present value criterion. According to this criterion, a resource is ideally sold at the moment that the profit plus compounded interest is expected to be higher than it will be at any point in the foreseeable future, thus ensuring maximal economic value. On the other hand, there were people who advocated a more conservationist approach in the belief that the present value criterion resulted in too rapid use of the resource and too little consideration of the needs of future generations. Some scientists suggested that helium ought to be separated from as many sources as would be energetically ideal.

Discussions continue. The occurrence of a worldwide helium shortage in 2006-7 made such concerns more pressing. This shortage caused price spikes and a complete cut-off of supply for some prospective buyers. Some equipment can become useless or permanently damaged without an adequate helium supply. For example, an uninterrupted supply of liquid helium is necessary for a vast number of university researchers, hospitals, pharmaceutical companies and high-tech industries. Without liquid helium, all magnetic resonance imaging machines would become inoperable and there is currently no equivalent diagnostic technology to replace them. As a consequence, helium shortages are a very serious matter for certain groups. However, helium has a much wider range of applications. It has been used in other research laboratories, lighter-than-air craft, rockets, welding under inert conditions, producing breathing mixtures for deep-sea diving, respiratory therapy, and in cryogenics. Aside from laboratory applications and cryogenics, not all these uses exploit the unique properties of helium, which is therefore replaceable.

One consequence of fears of helium shortages is attempts to improve production volume. It is profitable for natural gas manufacturers to recover helium from sources containing more than 0.3 percent. Part of the strategy of the 2013 Helium Stewardship Act, currently implemented by the United States Department of Energy through its Advanced Manufacturing Office of Isotopes within the Office of Nuclear Physics in the United States Department of Energy Office of Science, was to improve the economics of recovering helium beyond that threshold by making advances in the membrane technology used in the production process.

The average price of liquid helium in North America in 2013 was around $6 per liter and represents the lower end of the price range; Europe with around $10 per liter is in the middle, whereas Latin America and Asia extend the highest band range of $13–15 per liter.

== Special situation of researchers ==
Several research organisations have released statements on the scarcity and conservation of helium. Among these are the American Physical Society, counting approximately 53,000 members, the Materials Research Society, an international organisation with 16,000 members, and the American Chemical Society, the world's largest scientific society with some 158,000 members. These organisations released policy recommendations as early as 1995 and as late as 2016 urging the United States government to store and conserve helium because of the natural limits to the helium supply and the unique nature of the element. For researchers, helium is irreplaceable because it is essential for producing very low temperatures. In recent years, concerns about high prices and the occurrence of a shortage in 2006-7 have also contributed to calls for helium conservation and measures to lower the price of helium for researchers from these organisations. Not only the level of prices impose hardships on researchers, but also their volatility. As researchers often work with essentially fixed budgets, sudden rises in the price of helium lead to a lack of sufficient funds for their research projects. An example from the United States of America clearly demonstrates the effect on researchers’ budgets: while in the mid-2000s individual investigator awards from the National Science Foundation’s Division of Materials Research were approximately $130,000 annually, and a typical low-temperature researcher spent up to $15,000 of their grant annually on liquid helium, in 2015 the typical Division of Materials Research grant for an individual investigator has only barely increased to $140,000 per year while researchers now have to spend upwards of $40,000—more than one-quarter of their grant—on liquid helium. Currently, liquid helium can represent upwards of 30% of the cost of some low-temperature research projects.

In response, research organisations have allocated funds for grants for small-scale liquefiers for research purposes. According to estimates from the Division of Materials Research, there are potentially hundreds of research groups for which it would be economically viable to purchase such a system, but who do not have the necessary funds, as only a small fraction can be assisted by such grant programs.

High prices have caused research organisations to issue recommendations to both the United States government and researchers on how to conserve helium by reducing consumption. In the wake of high prices, more researchers have invested in gas-capture systems to reduce their helium consumption. Such systems can pay for themselves within three years.

Another measure that has been taken to ensure helium supply for researchers in the United States is the partnering of the American Physical Society and the American Chemical Society with the Defence Logistics Agency of the Department of Defense to create the Liquid Helium Purchasing Program, which provides more affordable and reliable liquid helium to program members. By combining customers’ needs, the Defence Logistics Agency substantially increases its purchasing power when negotiating contracts and price. The program also partners with multiple liquid helium suppliers so that its customers are not tied to a single vendor. The program enrollees achieved more reliable delivery and average savings of 15 percent.

According to these research organisations, adverse effects of the high price of helium on research are already beginning to be seen: scientists are abandoning areas of research that require liquid helium, professors are having to cut hiring of graduate students, and institutions are moving away from hiring new faculty in areas of research that require the use of liquid helium.

== Development of the helium industry ==
In 1914, helium was mooted in Britain and the United States as a replacement for hydrogen in barrage balloons and aircraft.

The first major development in helium production was the Helium Conservation Act of March 3, 1925. It established a production and sales program under the control of a centralized entity, the United States Bureau of Mines. Around this time, it was discovered that helium enabled divers to stay under water longer and ascend in a shorter time, presenting another application for helium. In reaction to depleting helium sources, the Helium Act of March 3, 1927, was established to prohibit the sale of helium to foreign countries and for non-governmental domestic use.

By 1937, several factors collided to move the United States government to revise its helium policy and create the Helium Act of September 1, 1937. New uses for helium were appearing and the U.S. Army and Navy did not require anywhere near the national output. A final impetus was given by the Hindenburg disaster, which may have been prevented had the Germans had access to helium. The act authorized the sale of helium gas not needed by the U.S. government. This ultimately led to an expansion in helium usage in many scientific and commercial industries as the Bureau of Mines also supplied helium to private entities. The passage of this act also allowed non-hostile foreign governments to purchase helium for their commercial use. When Nazi Germany applied for 18 million cubic feet of helium for public airship travel, this sparked a debate in the U.S., leading to a refusal.

Throughout the Second World War, government demand still significantly outweighed private use and the supply was sufficient to meet government needs (230 million cubic feet in 1942). By the end of the war, demand for helium had dropped precipitously and the operation of most production plants ceased. This led the Bureau of Mines to begin a helium conservation program in January 1945 by injecting surplus helium into the Cliffside Gas Field.

== Creation of the US National Helium Reserve ==
From 1917 to 1962, the Bureau of Mines was the primary producer of helium and it remained the sole purifier of helium until 1963. Leading up to the early 1960s, there was a rapid growth in government demand in the United States for helium. It was fuelled by the military, especially for aerospace applications such as liquid fuel rockets for defense and space exploration. The amount of stored helium was very small before 1962 and the amount of available helium was essentially determined by the production of natural gas, from which it is separated as a side product, rather than by market forces.

This situation changed in the early 1960s with the creation of the United States National Helium Reserve. At this time, the Bureau of Mines negotiated long-term contracts with four private companies for the first time to purchase and store large amounts of helium and it established an underground reservoir in the Cliffside Field near Amarillo, Texas. The original purpose of this reserve was to store helium in the 1960s for government use in the 1970s. To ensure that the revenue from future sales would amortize the cost, the Secretary of the Interior raised the price of high purity helium from $12 per thousand cubic feet to $35. This price jump was an incentive for private companies to enter the market and sell helium at lower prices. By 1970, it also became evident that the projected increase in government demand did not occur and that the helium stored in the Cliffside Field would last for decades. The combination of lower-than-projected demand and private competition resulted in sustained losses for the National Helium Reserve. In reaction, the government cancelled its contracts in 1973. As a consequence, the industrial capacity utilization rate for helium production dropped from 104% in 1966 to 41.7% in 1974. The helium companies involved in the operation sued the United States government for breach of contract. The owners of the land containing the natural gas from which helium was separated as a side-product sued the government for the value of the helium, as they were unable to sell it to third parties. In the 1970s the Bureau of Mines changed its policy to allow private companies to store helium in the Cliffside Field. This had a profound impact on the industry. Prior to this decision, roughly two billion cubic feet of helium were separated from natural gas annually and 0.6 billion cubic feet were sold. Three years after the decision, 0.88 billion cubic feet were sold, 0.54 were stored, and 0.98 were separated and vented. At the same time, roughly 4.74 billion cubic feet were not separated from natural gas.

== Helium Privatization Act ==
In the 1990s there was a rapid growth in demand due to the development of the electronics and magnetic resonance imaging industries. This growth continued at a slower pace until the 2010s, with the exception of 2008–2009. National Helium Reserve sales led to fluctuations in both pricing and supply. In this context, the Helium Privatization Act was passed in the United States in 1996. The Bureau of Land Management was given responsibility for operating the National Helium Reserve and charged with recouping the taxpayers’ investment by selling its crude helium to private vendors. More recent legislation aimed at fully privatising the helium market requires that the Bureau of Land Management sell off the vast majority of the reserve during the next several years and cease its operations by 2021. After problems with the helium supply in 2012–2013, the United States Congress acted to extend the life of the reserve.

== New producers ==
While formerly most of the helium production technologies were in the United States, additional producing countries slowly appeared, and Qatar, Canada, Algeria and Russia are producers of the gas. In 2015, this new production resulted in a surplus of supply over demand. The United States, which has historically been an exporter of helium, will soon become an importer for the first time in its history. Since 2013 the world's largest helium hub is no longer located in the United States of America but in Qatar, which produces 1.3 billion cubic feet of helium per year from a single project and meets 25% of the global demand. One challenge related to bringing new helium sources onto the market is that it usually requires venture capital financing. Another challenge is that the current selling price of U.S. Cliffside helium is too low to encourage more new producers to enter the field.
