= Soncy, Texas =

- Historical unincorporated community
- Location within Texas Location within the United States
- Coordinates: 35°11′20″N 101°56′33″W
- Country: United States
- State: Texas
- County: Potter
- Elevation: 3,730 ft (1,140 m)
- Time zone: UTC-6 (Central (CST))
  - Summer (DST): UTC-5 (CDT)
- GNIS feature IDdoo: 1380572

Soncy was an unincorporated community in Potter County, located in the U.S. state of Texas. It is now largely within the city limits of Amarillo. Soncy joins St. Francis Boulevard, which runs east to west in the northern section of town, with Hollywood Road routing west to east in the southern section of town.

Soncy is a main thoroughfare in the west and intersects the belt road in Amarillo. The town is geographically located between Interstate 40 and the former U.S. Route 66 in the Texas Panhandle.

In the early 1930s, the United States Bureau of Mines and United States Department of War constructed an industrial gas extraction plant known as the Amarillo Helium Plant within the vicinity of Soncy, Texas.
