= Masterson, Texas =

Masterson
- Unincorporated community
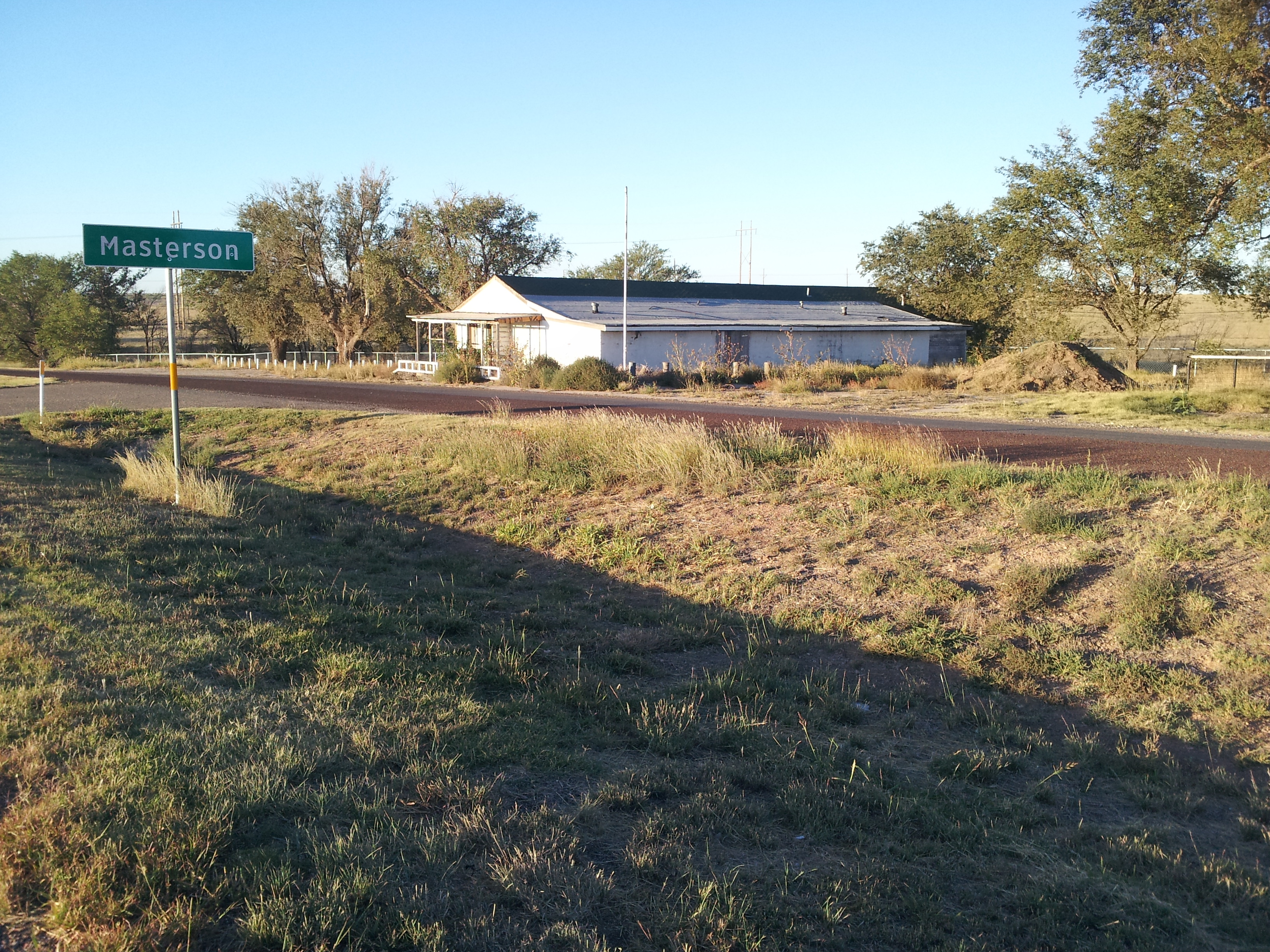
- The Masterson Post Office was located in the Exell General Store. The building in 2013.

- Location within the state of Texas Masterson (the United States)
- Coordinates: 35°38′09″N 101°57′37″W
- Country: United States
- State: Texas
- County: Moore
- Elevation: 3,704 ft (1,129 m)
- Time zone: UTC-6 (Central (CST))
  - Summer (DST): UTC-5 (CDT)
- ZIP codes: 79058
- GNIS feature ID: 1362269

Masterson is an unincorporated community in southern Moore County, Texas, United States of the Texas Panhandle. It lies along the concurrent U.S. Routes 87 and 287, south of the city of Dumas, the county seat of Moore County.

According to Olien and Olien, "Out in the country, oil companies built camps for workers and their families in and near oil fields. As elsewhere, the camps for workers were necessary because decent housing and good roads were scant, but camps were also directed toward employee retention by offering amenities of suburban life in the middle of nowhere at rock-bottom prices."

Masterson was founded in 1927 as a support community for Canadian River Gas plant and gas pipeline, together comprising the Panhandle Field. Masterson was named for Robert Masterson, while the plant was named Bivins Compressor station, after Lee Bivins, another Panhandle rancher. The community eventually included 32 company houses for families and a hotel for single men. The Bivins Elementary School was built in 1937 and educated children through the eighth grade, after which they attended school in Dumas. Starting in 1943, helium was extracted from the gas at the Exell Helium Plant, which is located nearby and managed by the Bureau of Land Management. The government built 75 houses for employee families. The Masterson post office was established in 1950 and was located in the Exell Store, built in 1948. The compressor station was sold to Colorado Interstate Gas (CIG) Company in 1951. CIG was acquired by the Coastal Corporation in 1973, which then merged with El Paso Corp. in 1999, which was bought by Kinder Morgan in 2011. Starting in 1963, the housing at both the Bivins and the Exell camps was phased out. The Bivins school was closed in 1978. The station was bought by Pioneer Natural Resources in 2002.

== Panhandle Gas Field ==
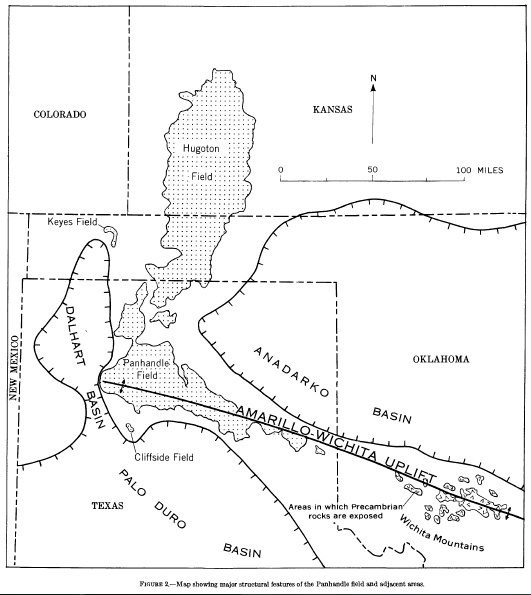
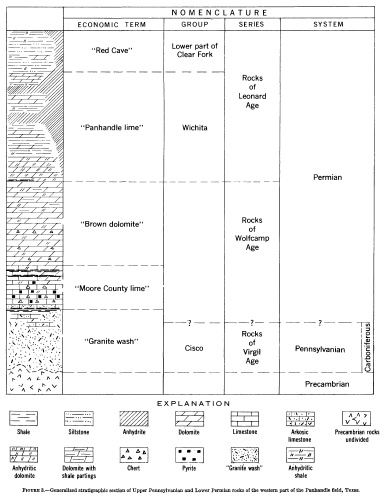
Panhandle Field geological map (left) and stratigraphic column (right)
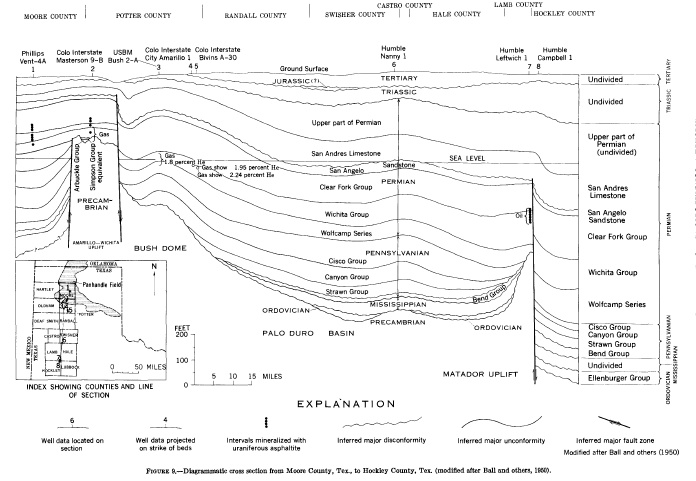
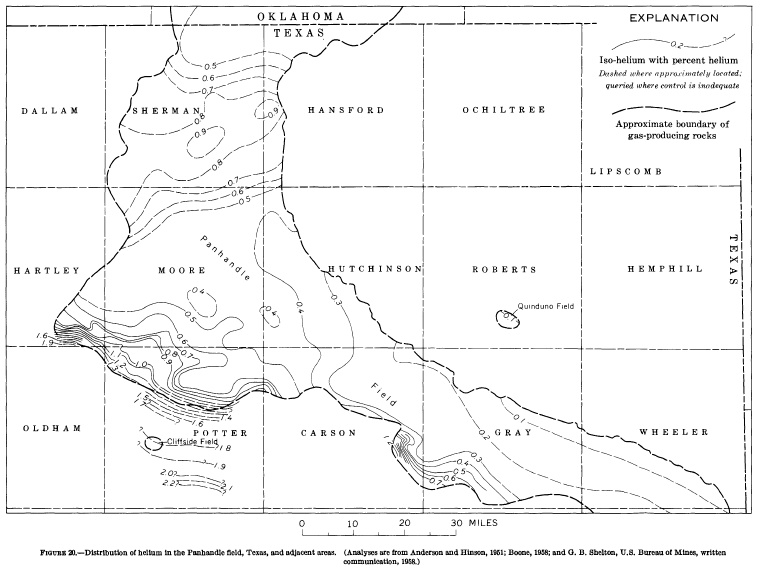
Panhandle Field cross section (left) and helium concentration (right)

The Panhandle Field is a structural trap, characterized by the Amarillo-Wichita Uplift or sometimes referred to as the buried "Amarillo mountains", which is bounded by three sedimentary basins: the Anadarko Basin to the north, the Dalhart Basin to the west, and the Palo Duro Basin to the south. This tectonic uplift occurred in the Late Mississippian to Early Pennsylvanian time and was sufficient to expose and erode the Precambrian granitic and rhyolitic basement complex forming a granitic wash, which was subsequently submerged and buried by marine sediments in the Permian (specifically, the Wolfcampian carbonates). The granitic wash and these marine sediments form the pay zones but the "gas, oil and water cut across formational boundaries". The Wolfcampian marine sediments include an arkosic lime, an arkosic dolomite, the Moore County Limestone, the White Dolomite, and the Brown Dolomite. The Leonardian Panhandle Lime, or Wichita, and Red Cave overlay these Wolfcampian sediments, with the anhydrite and dense-dolomite nature of the Wichita forming the reservoir seal. The source for the oil, gas and helium accumulations are the sedimentary rocks of Pennsylvanian age in the Palo Duro and Anadarko Basins. The helium would have been derived from uraniferous rocks and radiogenic in origin. The Panhandle Field has a pressure which is about 400 psi lower than the surrounding basins, which allows gases to migrate into it. Although low, the pressure is at normal hydrostatic pressure relative to the water table. Charles N. Gould mapped the John Ray Dome, which was drilled by the Amarillo Oil Company in 1918 resulting in the Panhandle Field discovery. Drilled to a depth of 2,395 feet, the well, No. 1 Masterson C, produced 5 million cubic feet of gas per day at a pressure of 420 psi. Oil in the Panhandle Field was discovered in 1921 with Gulf Producing Company's No. 2 Burnett well, producing 200 barrels per day.

== Charles N. Gould ==
After founding the geology department at the University of Oklahoma in 1900, Charles N. Gould worked summers doing field work for Frederick Haynes Newell, first director of the United States Reclamation Service (later known as the United States Bureau of Reclamation), investigating "the underground water resources of a portion of the southern part of the Great Plains." His first summer trip through the Panhandle in 1903 resulted in Water Supply Paper 154 of the United States Geological Survey, Geology and Water Resources of the Eastern Portion of the Panhandle of Texas, and a similar trip in 1905 resulted in Water Supply Paper 191, Geology and Water Resources of the Western Portion of the Panhandle of Texas. It was during this second trip Gould "explored and prepared a geological map of Palo Duro Canyon...giving names to the formations" and "studied the anticlines along the Canadian River, indications of which he saw in 1903.

In 1908, Gould became director of the Oklahoma Geological Survey and in 1916 was asked by "M.C. Nobles, a wholesale grocer of Amarillo" if he knew of "any oil and gas prospects..in the Panhandle" to which Gould replied "there appeared to be several big anticlines or domes in that region" but it "would probably be necessary to send a Plane table party into the field and prepare a detailed contour map of the area." Nobles organized the Amarillo Oil Company on 24 April 1917, from ten businessmen investing one thousand dollars each, and hired Gould to survey an area that included Lee Bivins' ranch south of the Canadian River, and R.B. Masterson's ranch north of the river. The resultant map showed a large dome fifteen miles in diameter with four hundred feet of relief, which Gould named the John Ray Dome after a nearby butte.

The company bought oil and gas leases on 64,000 acres around this "typical oil-and-gas structure" and Gould received one-sixteenth of the acreage, plus one thousand dollars, and paid expenses for his services. The nearest oil or gas was 225 miles away at the time which prompted the following speech by Gould before C.M. Hapgood drilled the company's first well, "No one knows whether or not the Lord has put any gas or oil in the Panhandle of Texas, but if there should be any oil or gas in this part of the world, this would appear to be the best place to find it. And, because this seems to be a very large dome, it is my judgement that one is more likely to find gas, rather than oil, in the first well drilled on the apex, or high point, of the dome." The well, Masterson Number 1, encountered several gas-bearing sands over its 2,200 feet depth in Dec. 1918, and flowed eleven million cubic feet a day.

Gould later discovered the Cliffside Dome, near the station Cliffside northwest of Amarillo, a large deposit of helium gas, the 666 dome, the north slope of which is where the Borger Oil Field was located, and named the buried granite ridge in the Panhandle the "Amarillo Mountains". Gould's philosophy, "we always told our clients, the business of prospecting for oil or gas was first, last, and all the time a gamble. No one knows in advance of drilling what will be found at any particular place. There is always risk in drilling for oil and all the geologist can do is to minimize that risk."

== Gallery ==
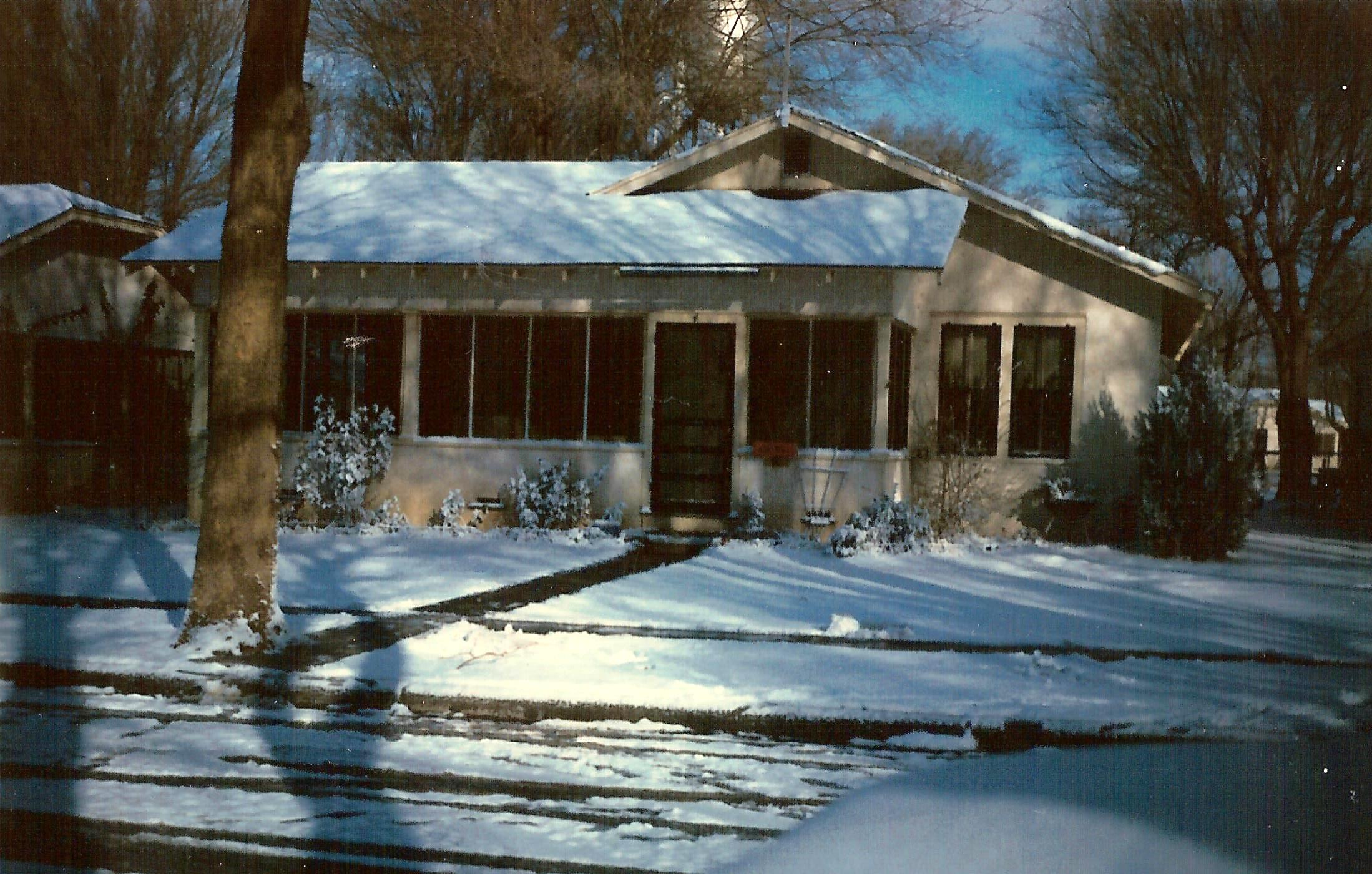
Typical CIG company house at Bivins Station, 1966. This one was on 4th street. Phone number 36F4 (four rings on the party line).

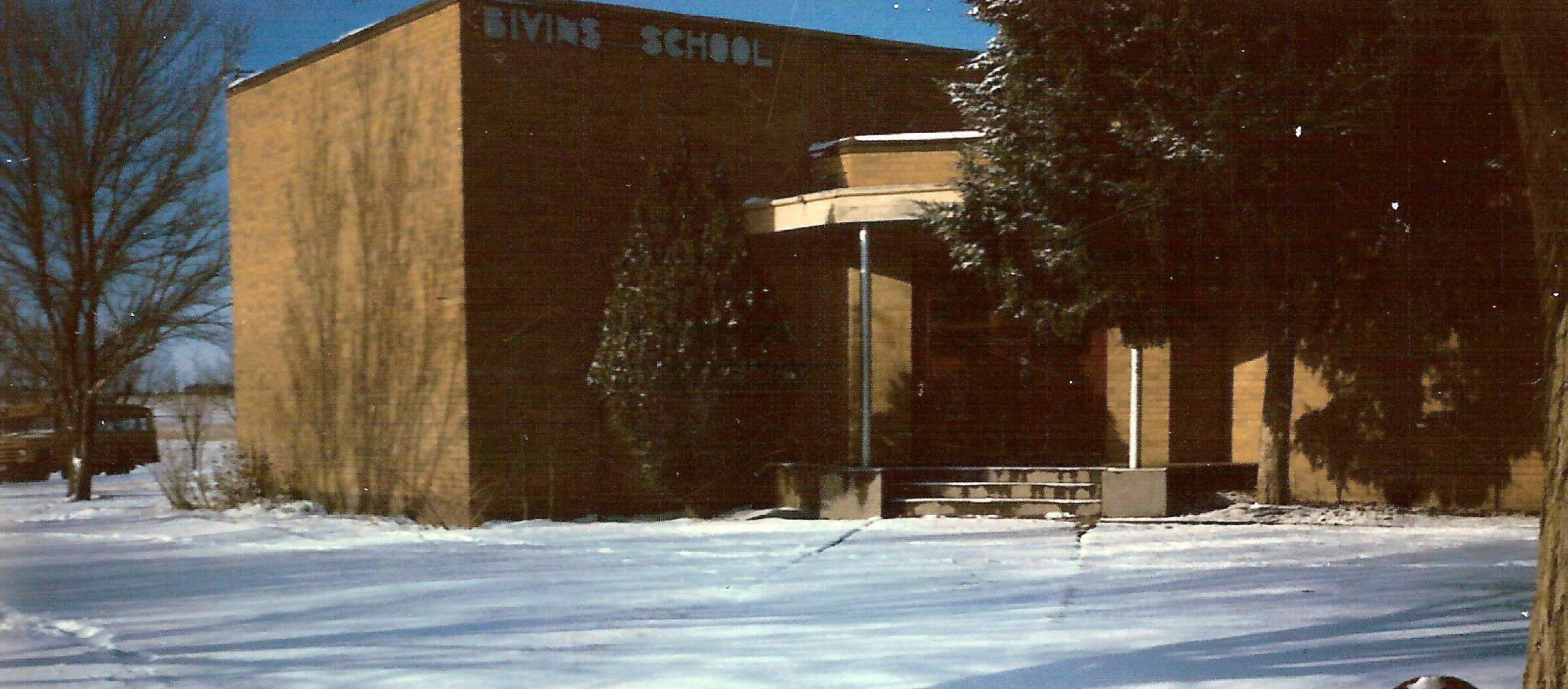
View of the Bivins School main entrance in 1965.

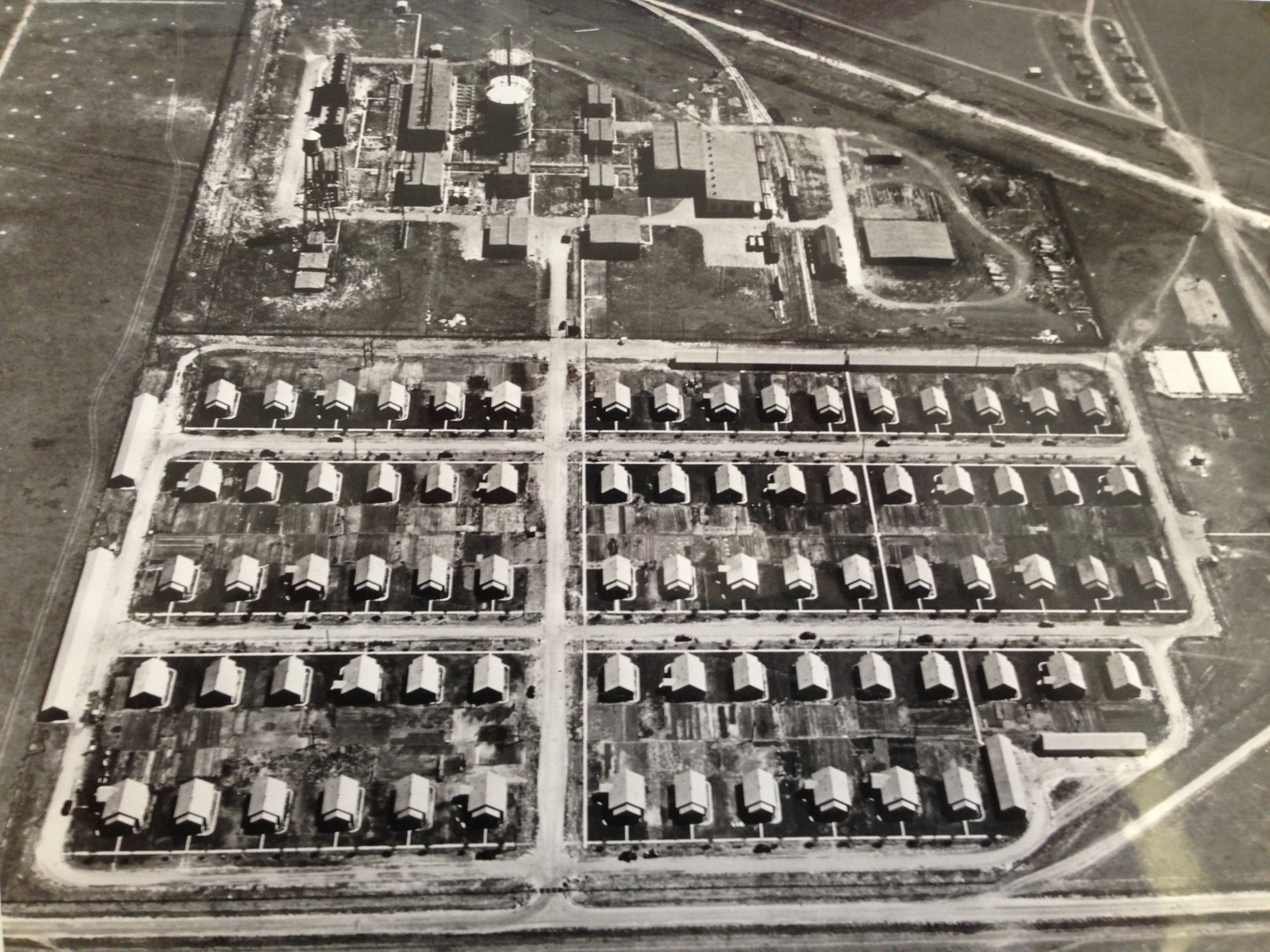
Exell Helium Plant, circa 1945, courtesy BLM.

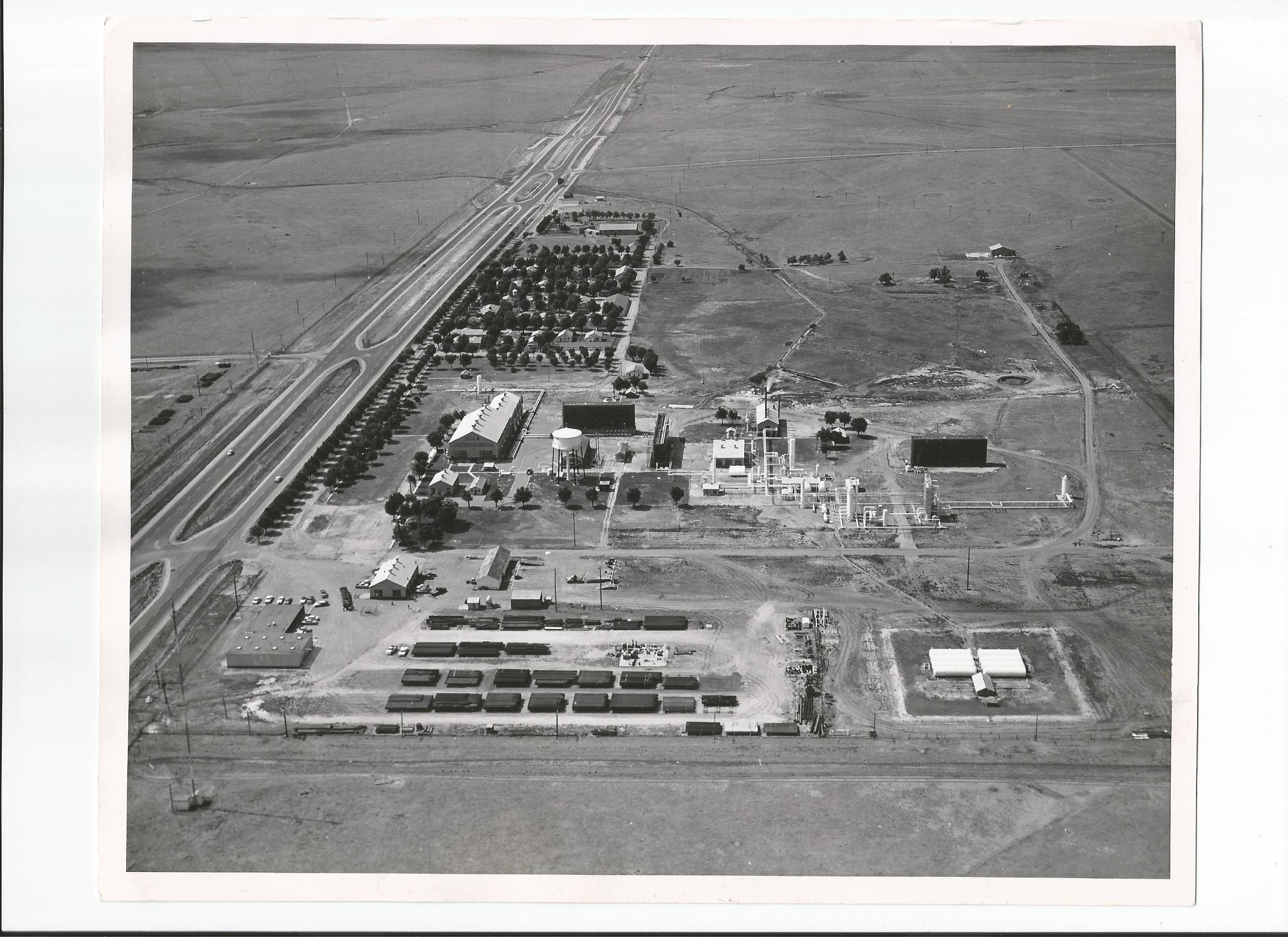
CIG Bivins Compressor Station and Masterson, Texas, circa early 1960s

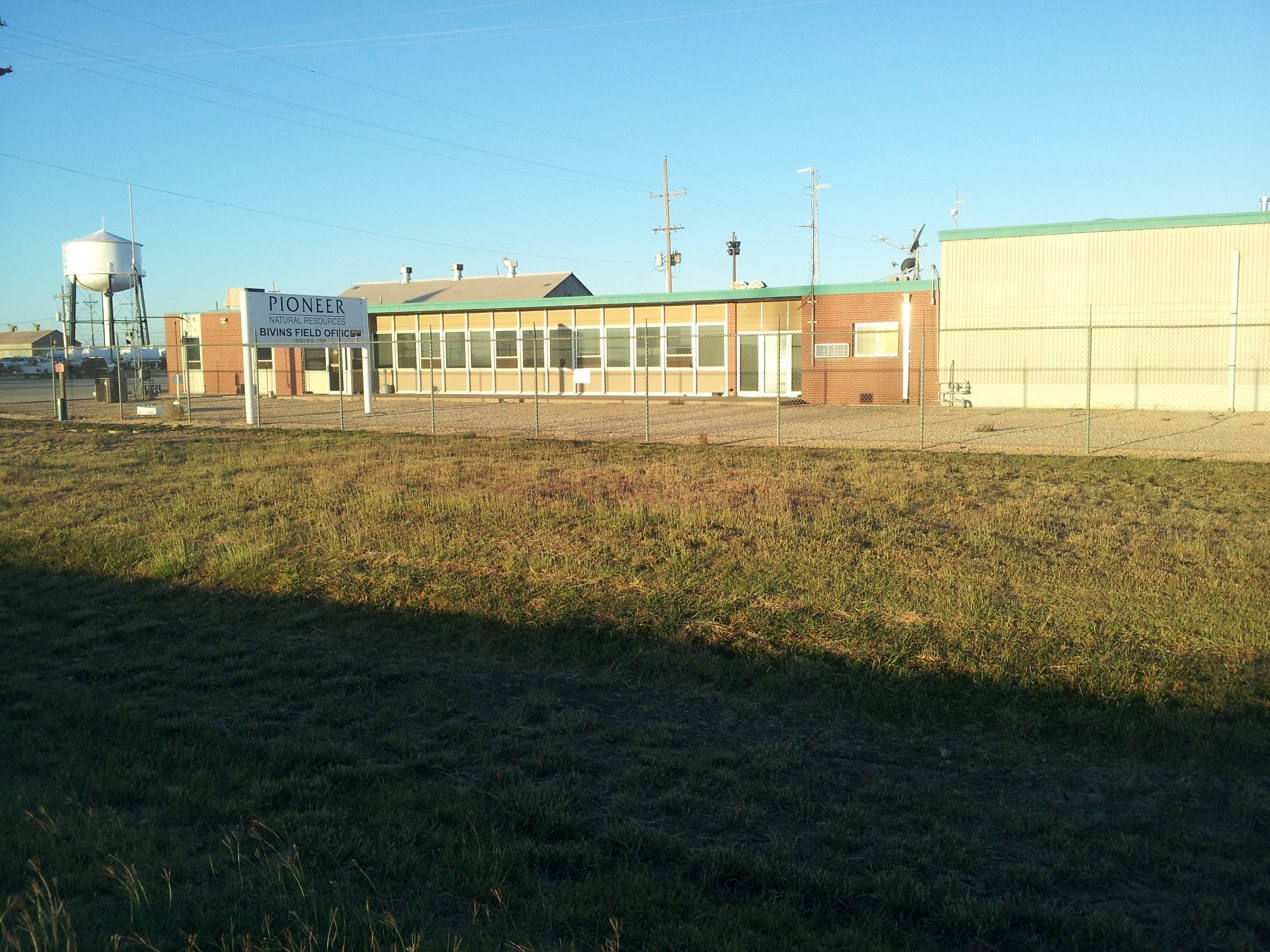
Bivins Station, 2013

== See also ==
- National Helium Reserve
- Hugoton Gas Field
