= Westphal balance =

Scientific instrument used to measure the density of liquids

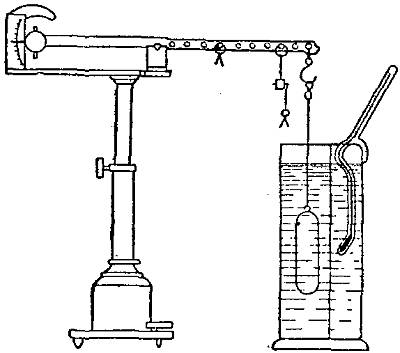
Westphal balance

A Westphal balance (also known as a Mohr balance) is a scientific instrument used to measure the density of liquids.

Accurate specific gravity determinations with the Westphal balance are possible only when the weight of water displaced by the plummet at 15° and the weights of the riders possess an exact multiple relationship among themselves. Deviations from this relationship can produce errors of significant magnitude.
