= Hamilton Cady =

American chemist (1874–1943)

Hamilton Perkins Cady
- Born: May 2, 1874; Skiddy, Kansas, U.S.
- Died: May 26, 1943 (aged 69); Lawrence, Kansas, U.S.
- Education: University of Kansas
- Occupations: Chemist, Professor of Chemistry
- Known for: Discovery and development of the first industrial source of helium gas
- Children: 3

Hamilton Perkins Cady (May 2, 1874 – May 26, 1943) was an American chemist who in 1907 in collaboration with David McFarland discovered that helium could be extracted from natural gas.

== Early life ==
On May 2, 1874, Cady was born in Skiddy, Kansas. He is the son of Perkins Elijah Cady and Ella Falkenbury.

== Education ==
After attending Carleton College, Northfield, Minnesota, he enrolled at the University of Kansas, where he graduated in 1897 with an A.B., and in 1903 with a Ph.D. During his senior year he carried out the initial experiments on the electrical conductance of solutions of salts in liquid ammonia, opening up a new and fruitful field of research. This constituted the first step in the development of the ammonia system of compounds, a concept which, owing to the later contributions of Edward C. Franklin and Charles A. Kraus, became an outstanding feature of American chemical achievement.

Following the completion of his undergraduate work he was granted a scholarship and then a fellowship at Cornell University where he spent the years 1897–1899 in research under the direction of Wilder D. Bancroft.

== Career ==
In 1899, Cady returned to the University of Kansas as assistant professor of chemistry and resumed his work with liquid ammonia in collaboration with Franklin, carrying out a thesis consisting of a study of concentration cells in this solvent.

When Franklin was called to Stanford University in 1903 Cady took over his courses in inorganic and physical chemistry at Kansas as associate professor. In 1911 he was advanced to professor and in 1920 was made chairman of the department, continuing until 1942 when he retired with the title of professor emeritus.

His most notable work was in the discovery and development of the first industrial source of helium gas. In 1903 he was called on to analyze a natural gas from Dexter, Kansas, which would not burn unless continuously heated. In collaboration with David McFarland he discovered that the gas contained nearly 12% of helium. No helium in natural gas had been discovered prior to that time, although it had been found in 1894 that helium existed on the earth, and might be extracted in small quantities from the atmosphere and from minerals. Cady was a consultant when helium reserves were later found in Texas and Colorado.

In 1917 he was appointed consulting chemist to the U.S. Bureau of Mines upon the inauguration by the Bureau of experiments with regard to helium and during the World War I he did a large amount of analytical and research work, the results of which influenced the designs of the various helium plants which were constructed by the government. He also made valuable research into the limits of the inflammability of helium and hydrogen mixtures and carried out a number of experiments on the permeability of balloon fabric by helium. In 1933 he developed a process for using chimney gases in the manufacture of a refrigerant. In 1936 he developed a new method for the accurate measurement of gaseous densities by means of a modified Westphal balance. The invention made it possible for the determination of molecular weight of gases with a degree of speed and precision not approached by any other method.

Despite his achievements in research, teaching constituted Cady's real life work. His courses won nationwide repute, and many of his former students attained eminence in scientific fields. He was co-author with Edgar Henry Summerfield Bailey of A Laboratory Guide to the Study of Qualitative Analysis (1901) and author of The Principles of Inorganic Chemistry (1912), and General Chemistry (1916).

He was a member of the American Association for the Advancement of Science, and the American Chemical Society.

== Personal ==
On June 5, 1900, Cady married Stella Cornelia Gallup, daughter of George Gallup. They had three children: Ruth Caroline, George Hamilton, and Helen Frances. On May 26, 1943, Cady died in Lawrence, Kansas. Cady was 69.
