= National Helium Reserve =

Strategic helium reserve of the United States

Coordinates: 35°21′07″N 101°59′28″W

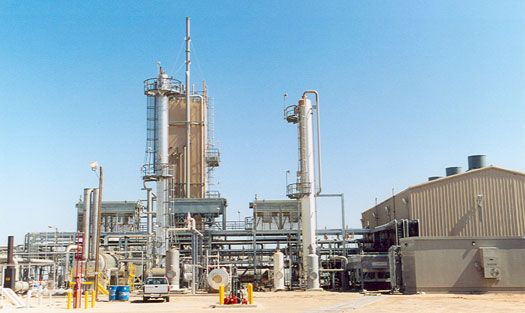
The Crude Helium Enrichment Unit in the Cliffside Gas Field.

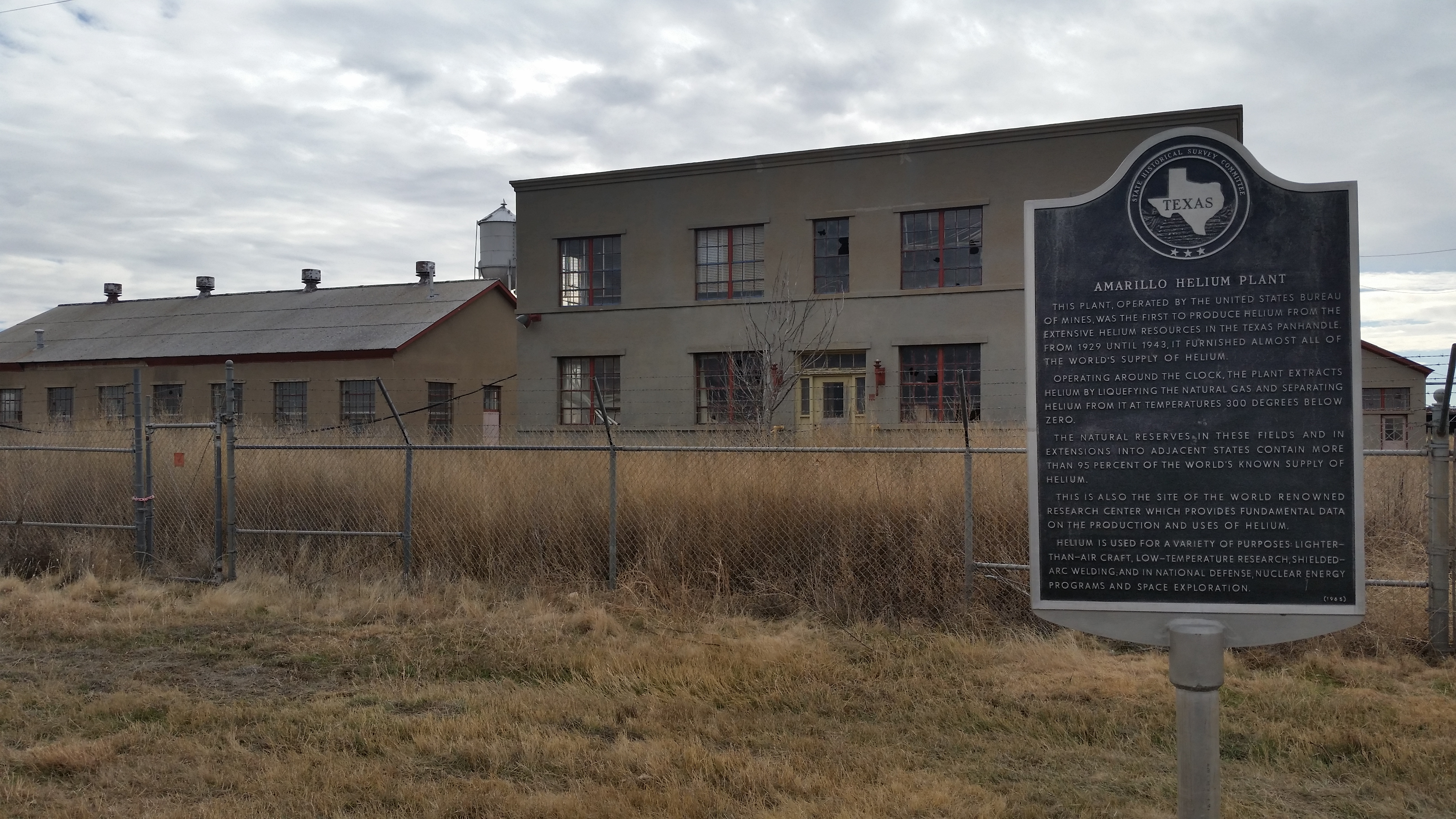
Remnants of the Amarillo Helium Plant in 2015

The National Helium Reserve, also known as the Federal Helium Reserve, was a strategic reserve of the United States, which once held over 1 billion cubic meters (about 170,000,000 kg) (Note: Based on helium having a density of 0.167 kg/m^{3} (0.281 lb/cu yd) at sea level and 15 °C (59 °F).) of helium gas. The helium is stored at the Cliffside Storage Facility about 12 miles (19 km) northwest of Amarillo, Texas, in a natural geologic gas storage formation, the Bush Dome reservoir. The reserve was established with the enactment of the Helium Act of 1925. The strategic supply provisioned the noble gas for airships, and in the 1950s became an important source of coolant during the Cold War and Space Race.

The facilities were located close to the Hugoton and other natural gas fields in southwest Kansas and the panhandle of Oklahoma, plus the Panhandle Field in Texas. These fields contained natural gas with unusually high percentages of helium—from 0.3% to 2.7%—and constitute the United States' largest helium source. The helium is separated as a byproduct from the produced natural gas.

After the Helium Acts Amendments of 1960 (Public Law 86–666), the U.S. Bureau of Mines arranged for five private plants to recover helium from natural gas. For this helium conservation program, the Bureau built a 425-mile (684 km) pipeline from Bushton, Kansas, to connect those plants with the government's partially depleted Cliffside gas field. This helium-nitrogen mixture was injected and stored in the Cliffside gas field until needed, when it then was further purified.

By 1995, a billion cubic metres of the gas had been collected, and the reserve was US$1.4 billion in debt, prompting Congress to begin phasing out the reserve in 1996. The resulting Helium Privatization Act of 1996 (Public Law 104–273) directed the Department of the Interior to start selling off the reserve by 2005.

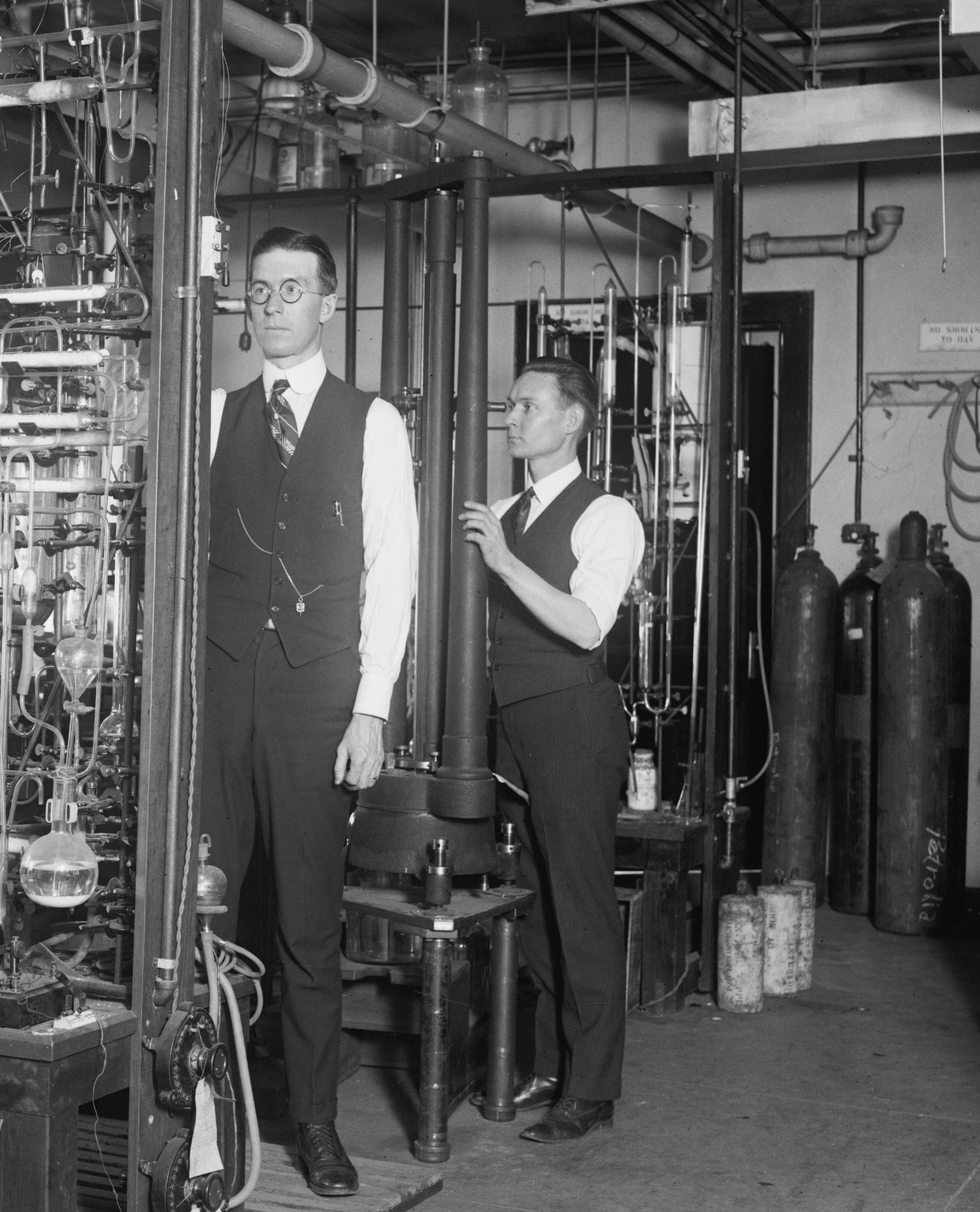
Helium gas production on March 8, 1923

Government sales flooded the market with cheap helium, causing much of the private helium industry to shut down; the facility remained in government hands. The Helium Stewardship Act of 2013 mandated higher prices but a continued selldown to 3 billion ft^{3} (85 million m^{3}) remaining by October 1, 2018, which was achieved with auctions. It also set a deadline of September, 30, 2021 for sale of the reserve.

The Bureau of Land Management (BLM) transferred the reserve to the General Services Administration (GSA) as surplus property, but a 2022 auction failed to finalize a sale. On June 22, 2023, the GSA announced a new auction of the facilities and remaining helium. The auction of the last helium assets was due to take place in November, 2023. Though the last of the Cliffside reserve was to be sold by November 2023, more natural gas was discovered at the site than was previously known, and the Bureau of Land Management extended the auction to January 25, 2024 to allow for increased bids. In 2024 the remaining reserve was sold to the highest bidder, Messer Group.

== See also ==
- Helium production in the United States
- Masterson, Texas
- Helium storage and conservation
- Strategic natural gas reserve
