= Helium Privatization Act of 1996 =

United States statute

- Long title: An Act to amend the Helium Act to authorize the Secretary to enter into agreements with private parties for the recovery and disposal of helium on Federal lands, and for other purposes.
- Enacted by: the 104th United States Congress
- Effective: October 9, 1996

Citations
- Public law: 104-273
- Statutes at Large: 110 Stat. 3315

Codification
- Acts amended: Helium Act of 1925
- Titles amended: 50 U.S.C.: War and National Defense
- U.S.C. sections amended: 50 U.S.C. ch. 10 § 167 et seq.

Legislative history
- Introduced in the House as H.R. 4168 by Christopher Cox (R-CA) on September 25, 1996; Committee consideration by House Resources; Passed the House on September 26, 1996 (Passed Voice Vote); Passed the Senate on September 28, 1996 (Passed Unanimous Consent); Signed into law by President Bill Clinton on October 9, 1996

The Helium Privatization Act of 1996 is a United States statute that ordered the US government to sell much of the National Helium Reserve. The 104th Congress passed the Act of Congress presenting the legislation to the United States President on September 30, 1996. President Bill Clinton enacted the federal statute into law on October 9, 1996.

The law was described by critics as a "fiasco" due to the formula-based sale price being significantly lower than the market price for helium. The bill was amended in 2013 to use an auction to sell helium.
