= Hugoton Gas Field =

Large natural gas field in Kansas, Oklahoma, and Texas

Coordinates: 37.1800°N 101.3490°W

Hugoton Gas Field is a large natural gas field in the U.S. states of Kansas, Oklahoma, and Texas. Its name is derived from the town of Hugoton, Kansas, near which the Hugoton Field was first discovered.

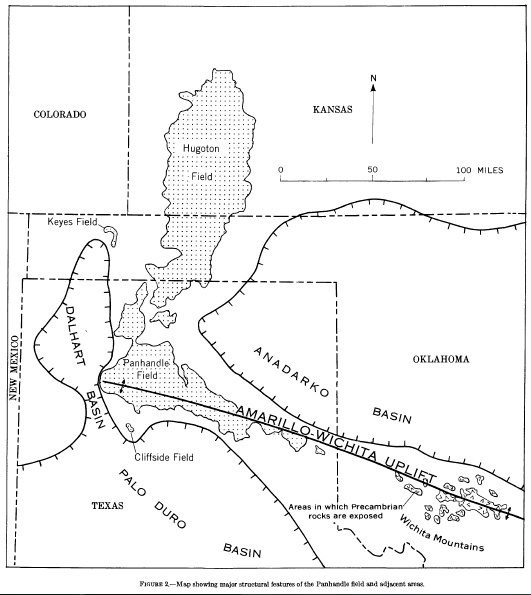
Hugoton and Panhandle Fields

== History ==
Natural gas in the Hugoton area was first discovered in 1922 in the Boles #1 well, in Seward County, two miles west of Liberal. The well was drilled in 1919 to a depth of 2,919 feet by the Defenders Petroleum and Traders Oil and Gas Company, but was shut in for three years because it did not find oil. In 1922 the well was completed as a gas well, but there was little demand for natural gas in the area and it was years before another gas well was drilled in the field.

In 1927, gas was discovered at the Independent Oil and Gas Company's Crawford No. 1, about 2,600 feet (790 meters) below the surface southwest of Hugoton, Kansas, in Stevens County. This is now considered the center of the Hugoton Field. By the end of 1928, five wells had been drilled in the field and the first pipeline was transporting gas to local markets. In 1929, Argus Pipe Line Company started construction of a pipeline to furnish gas to Dodge City, Kansas. Construction of major pipelines in the 1930s encouraged further drilling in the area. In 1977, gas was discovered at the Brown and Woolsey in the M. MAUNE, Well 1.

In 2007, the Hugoton gas area produced 358 billion cubic feet of gas, making it the 5th largest source of natural gas in the United States.

Gas production by year
Year	Production (mcf)	Wells	Cumulative (mcf)
2015	110,193,159	7649	18,507,153,060
2016	98,405,418	7579	18,605,558,478
2017	91,796,374	7498	18,697,354,852
2018	85,872,232	7439	18,783,227,084
2019	81,029,876	7361	18,864,256,960
2020	76,725,624	7279	18,940,982,584
2021	35,424,523	7148	18,976,407,107

== Helium ==
The natural gas in the Hugoton field of Kansas and Oklahoma, plus the Panhandle Field of Texas, contains unusually high concentrations of helium, from 0.3% to 1.9%. Because of the large size of these fields, they contain the largest reserves of helium in the United States. Helium is separated out as a byproduct from natural gas, from the Hugoton field, the Panhandle field in Texas, the Greenwood field in Kansas, and the Keyes field in Oklahoma. Much of the recovered helium is piped to the National Helium Reserve in Amarillo, Texas, where it is stored underground in geologic formations for future use.

== Geology ==
The Hugoton Field is a stratigraphic trap overlying a monocline, with the primary pay found in the Krider Dolomite of Permian age. This dolomite and the overlying Herington dolomite make up the Wolfcampian carbonates. Above these carbonates is the Wichita, an anhydrite and dense dolomite forming the reservoir seal, which thins to the west. Marine carbonates were being deposited from the Late Pennsylvanian until Early Permian when the western portion of the area was uplifted which resulted in erosion and the deposition of red clays and sands, the future red beds consisting of shales and sandstones. Marine carbonate deposition followed, resulting in the interfingering of the red beds and carbonates, the basis of the stratigraphic trap and a tilted gas-water contact.

== See also ==
- Helium production in the United States
- Index of Kansas-related articles
- Lists of places in Kansas
