= National Security Act of 1947 =

United States law restructuring its armed forces

- Long title: An Act to promote the national security by providing for a Secretary of Defense; for a National Military Establishment; for a Department of the Army, a Department of the Navy, a Department of the Air Force; and for the coordination of the activities of the National Military Establishment with other departments and agencies of the Government concerned with the national security.
- Enacted by: the 80th United States Congress
- Effective: September 18, 1947

Citations
- Public law: Pub. L. 80–253
- Statutes at Large: 61 Stat. 495

Codification
- Titles amended: 50 U.S.C.: War and National Defense
- U.S.C. sections created: 50 U.S.C. § 401

Legislative history
- Introduced in the Senate as S. 758 by Chan Gurney (R–SD) on March 3, 1947; Committee consideration by Armed Services Committee; Passed the Senate on July 9, 1947; Passed the House on July 19, 1947; Signed into law by President Harry S. Truman on July 26, 1947

Major amendments
- USA Freedom Act

United States Supreme Court cases
- Greene v. McElroy, 360 U.S. 474 (1959); Central Intelligence Agency v. Sims, 471 U.S. 159 (1985); Webster v. Doe, 486 U.S. 592 (1988)

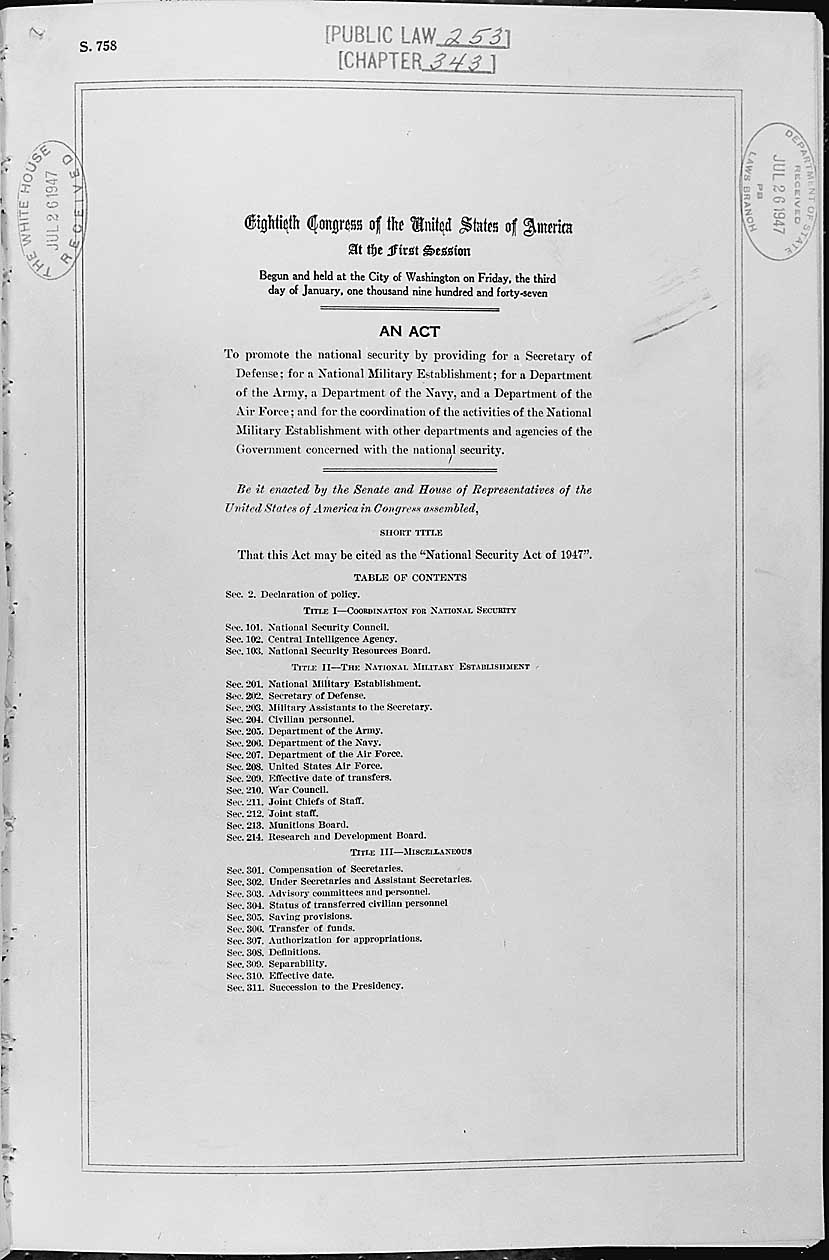
The first page of the engrossed Act

The last page of the engrossed Act. Signed by House Speaker Joseph Martin, Senate President pro tempore Arthur Vandenberg, and President Truman.

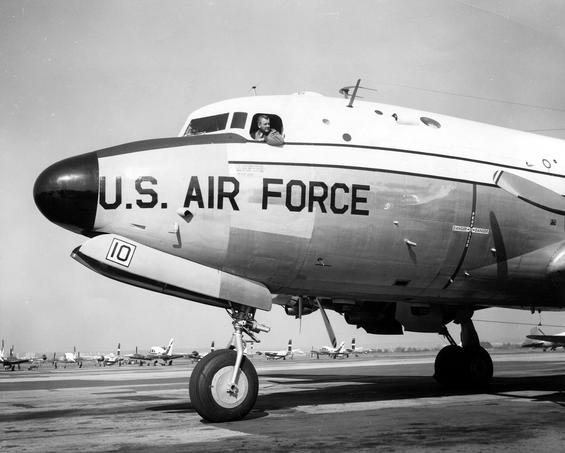
President Truman signed the National Security Act of 1947 on board this VC-54C Presidential transport, the first aircraft used for the role of Air Force One.

The National Security Act of 1947 (Pub.L. 80-253, 61 Stat. 495, enacted July 26, 1947) is a law enacting major restructuring of the United States government's military and intelligence agencies following World War II. The majority of the provisions of the act took effect on September 18, 1947, the day after the Senate confirmed James Forrestal as the first secretary of defense.

The act merged the Department of the Army (renamed from the Department of War), the Department of the Navy, and the newly established Department of the Air Force (DAF) into the National Military Establishment (NME). The act also created the position of the secretary of defense as the head of the NME. It established the United States Air Force under the DAF, which worked to separate the Army Air Forces into its own service. It also protected the Marine Corps as an independent service under the Department of the Navy. Aside from the unification of the three military departments, the act established the National Security Council and the Central Intelligence Agency, the latter of which is headed by the director of central intelligence.

The legislation was a result of efforts beginning in 1944. President Harry S. Truman proposed the legislation to Congress on February 26, 1947. The bill was introduced in the U.S. House of Representatives on February 28, 1947, and in the Senate on March 3, 1947. Senator Chan Gurney was the bill's sponsor. Senator Gurney, as chairman of the Senate Committee on Armed Services, led committee hearings for the bill from mid-March to early May. The bill passed in the Senate on July 9, 1947, and in the House on July 19, 1947. The Senate agreed to a related House resolution (H.Con.Res. 70) on July 16, 1947. The bill received bipartisan support and was passed in both chambers by voice vote. The National Security Act of 1947 was signed into law by President Truman on July 26, 1947, while aboard his VC-54C presidential aircraft Sacred Cow.

== Background ==
From 1921 to 1945, Congress considered approximately 50 bills to reorganize the armed forces. Mostly due to opposition by both the Department of the Navy and the War Department, all but one failed to reach the floor of the House, and even this one was defeated by a vote of 153 to 135 in 1932. However, by the end of World War II, several factors forced leaders to more seriously consider restructuring the military to improve unity.

=== Pearl Harbor ===
By 1945, the surprise attack on Pearl Harbor had already been investigated several times, for example by the Roberts Commission, and would continue to be investigated through almost the end of the century. One of the findings that emerged was the probable role of intelligence failures linked to interservice bickering between Pearl Harbor's Army and Navy commanders, General Walter Short and Admiral Husband Kimmel. Though not a court martial, the Roberts Commission explicitly accused the two of dereliction of duty for not conferring to coordinate in light of the warnings.

=== Joint operations in World War II ===
During World War II, interservice cooperation remained voluntary, requiring complex interchanges of liaisons for planning and operations. Additionally, the Army and Navy often competed for resources, for example industrial production and new recruits. Enabling operations under these conditions had required the creation of numerous joint agencies and interdepartmental committees.

World War II had also given the US military two case studies of joint operations between Europe and the Pacific. In the Pacific, the Army and Navy had experienced constant friction from command and logistics problems. In Europe, the Joint Chiefs of Staff (JCS), created based on the British Chiefs of Staff Committee, had smoothed over these coordination problems and became President Roosevelt's principal military advisors.

The JCS became a key source of advocacy for creating a single unified military department after the war. Following studies by the JCS Joint Strategic Survey Committee on ways to resolve joint roles and missions problems, George Marshall published a memo in support of postwar unification on November 2, 1942. Marshall's memo called for the following:

- Reorganizing the Navy and War Departments into a single department led by a civilian secretary
- Creating an independent air force under the new department
- Creating an independent supply service under the new department
- Placing each of the four services under a civilian secretary and a military chief of staff
- Creating a "United States General Staff" made up of the four service chiefs plus a chief of staff to the President.

=== The rise of air power ===
During both world wars, but particularly World War II, aviation had become increasingly important. The aircraft carrier had overtaken the battleship as the Navy's premier surface combatant. Army airmen had called for an independent air service since 1919, and the Army's Air Corps had already been expanded into what bordered on a separate service. Finally, the advent of nuclear weapons delivered by bombers led some leaders, such as Curtis LeMay, to believe air power would inevitably become more decisive than ground warfare or sea power. The time seemed right to create an independent air force, but it would require congressional action.

=== Shrinking budgets ===
Immediately following the war, confronting the Soviets was a lower priority than ending wartime austerity, balancing the federal budget, and returning to peace. This situation would not change until the Soviet Union developed nuclear weapons in 1949, followed by the Korean War in 1950.

In this environment, forces were rapidly demobilized, and budgets were slashed. In Fiscal Year 1946, the military's total budget ceiling was approximately $42 billion. In fiscal year 1947, it was $14 billion. On V-J Day, the US military consisted of the Army's 91 Army divisions, 9 Marine Corps divisions, 1,166 combat ships in the Navy, and 213 combat groups in the Army Air Forces. By the end of demobilization on June 30, 1947, the Army had 10 divisions, the Marine Corps had 2 divisions, the Navy had 343 combat ships, and the Army Air Forces had 63 groups of which only 11 were fully operational.

As forces were reduced and budgets were cut, unification seemed like a promising way to save money by reducing duplication, and this would become a theme to which its proponents would repeatedly return. It also created a sense of urgency to quickly institutionalize lessons learned from World War II. However, the shrinking budgets also created a zero-sum game environment which encouraged interservice bickering by pitting Army and Navy advocates against each other.

=== Executive power ===
Before World War II, congressional committees oversaw the Cabinet-level War Department and Navy Department, and while each department was separate from the other, both were able to obtain aircraft. During this time, the president had a level of authority over the departments. After the attack on Pearl Harbor, Congress passed the First War Powers Act, which authorized the sitting president "to make such redistribution of functions among executive agencies as he may deem necessary" provided that it is "only in matters relating to the conduct of the present war" and that these authorities will expire "six months after the termination of the war."

During World War II, then-chief of staff of the Army George Marshall brought the idea of unification of the armed services to President Franklin D. Roosevelt, but "he was routinely rebuffed on the grounds that a substantive discussion of this option while the country was at war might undermine the war effort." On August 26, 1944, future president Harry S. Truman, who was a senator at the time, wrote that "under such a set-up [of unification] another Pearl Harbor will not have to be feared" in his article "Our Armed Forces Must Be United". Military problems apparent during World War II that turned attention to the need for unification were a lack of preparedness, a lack of attention to "logistics in war," and a "lack of coordination among the services."

In the years following the war, President Truman had been pushing for the unification of the armed services until the passing of the National Security Act of 1947, having research conducted on the topic since 1944 and having expressed his desire for Congress to act on the issue as early as April 6, 1946. He stated in a letter to Congress on June 15, 1946, that he "consider[s] it vital that we have a unified force for our national defense." President Truman had worked closely with the Army and the Navy to establish a consensus, but the departments struggled to come to an agreement until 1947.

== Drafting legislation ==
However, even if everyone could admit that a military reorganization was necessary, they could not agree on how it should be done. The process of obtaining even tentative consensus would take nearly four years.

=== The Woodrum Committee ===
On March 28, 1944, the House passed a resolution introduced by Rep. James W. Wadsworth (R-NY) to create a Select Committee On Postwar Military Policy, and this began the debate. The committee chair was Rep. Clifton A. Woodrum (D-VA), and the committee itself was made up of seven members of the Naval Affairs Committee, seven members of the Military Affairs Committee, and nine other members.

Though the War Department considered asking for the hearings to be postponed to prevent an interservice fight that could hurt wartime unity, they decided not to when Secretary of the Navy Frank Knox told Secretary of War Henry Stimson that he also favored unification.

The hearings began on April 24, 1944. On the second day, Lieutenant General Joseph McNarney presented the War Department's plan for unification, which was essentially Marshall's plan as laid out in his memo.

On May 11, the commandant of the Marine Corps, Alexander Vandegrift, addressed the committee.

The hearings ended on May 19, 1944. Due to the increasingly apparent disagreements between the two departments, committee members and military leaders agreed that a fight between them would be bad for the war effort. In June, the committee reported the time was not right for legislation, but encouraged the two departments to continue to study unification.

=== The Richardson Committee ===
While the Woodrum Committee met, the JCS continued to study the problem by convening their own committee of two Army officers and two Navy officers. It was led by former Pacific Fleet commander Admiral James O. Richardson. The Richardson committee interviewed eighty commanders both at war and in Washington, almost all of flag rank, to get their thoughts on postwar reorganization.

On April 18, 1945, the Richardson Committee presented their findings and recommendations. They found that most Army officers and about half the Navy officers favored unification to a single service, but disagreed on the details. The committee's recommendations went even farther than McNarney's, calling not only for one civilian secretary overseeing the military and none overseeing the individual services, but also calling for a single uniformed "Commander of all Forces."

=== The Eberstadt Report ===
On June 19, 1945, the Department of the Navy began its own investigation. Secretary of the Navy James Forrestal requested an objective investigation of the postwar reorganization by his friend Ferdinand Eberstadt, the former chairman of the Army–Navy Munitions Board and former vice chair of the War Production Board. By late September, Eberstadt had finished his report, and Forrestal forwarded it to the chairman of the Naval Affairs Committee, David Walsh. The 200-page report's key recommendations included the following:

- Making the Joint Chiefs of Staff permanent.
- Creating an independent air force, but also letting the Army and Navy retain air forces.
- Reorganizing the military into three departments: War, Navy, and Air. Each would be led by a cabinet-rank secretary.
- Changing the administrative structures of the departments to mirror each other as much as possible.
- Creating a National Security Council.
- Creating a National Security Resources Board.
- Creating a Joint Munitions Board.
- Creating a Central Intelligence Agency.
- Creating a Joint Military Education and Training Board.
- Creating a civilian scientific research and development agency, and creating assistant secretaries for research and development in each of the services.
- Reviewing the many other joint boards and committees from World War II to determine which should be continued, combined, or dissolved.
- Maintaining close working relations with Congress.
- Appointing a commission to conduct analysis of the overall national security situation before making further changes.

=== 1945 Senate military affairs hearings ===
On January 3, 1945, the first day of the 79th Congress, Rep. Jennings Randolph (D-WV) submitted unification bill H.R. 550 to the House Committee on Expenditures in the Executive Department. Two days later, Sen. Lister Hill (D-AL) introduced a similar bill, S. 84, in the Senate.

From October 7 to December 17, 1945, the Senate Military Affairs Committee conducted hearings to consider unification bills. These included not only S. 84, but also S. 1482, introduced in the middle of the hearings by senators Edwin C. Johnson (D-CO) and Harley M. Kilgore (D-WV). However, the hearings mostly became a venue for the two departments, increasingly at odds, to give their official positions on different unification plans.

==== The War Department's Collins Plan ====
On October 30, General J. Lawton Collins presented the War Department's plan. It combined features of recommendations made by the Richardson committee (other than Richardson's dissent) and Marshall's original plan from November 1942. Its key recommendations included the following:

- Reorganizing the military services into a single department led by a civilian cabinet-rank secretary with at least one undersecretary, and assistant secretaries appointed as needed.
- Replacing the Joint Chiefs of Staff with a new chiefs of staff organization called the "US Chiefs of Staff" made up of the department secretary and service chiefs.
- Creating a single uniformed "Commander of the Armed Forces" who would also act as Chief of Staff to the President.
- Creating an independent air force

==== The Department of the Navy's Hensel Plan ====
On November 29, Assistant Secretary of the Navy H. Struve Hensel presented the Department of the Navy's plan. It was the recommendations of the Eberstadt Report, but left the question of an independent air force up to Congress.

==== Debate ====
Proponents of the Department of the Navy's plan came across as obstructionists due to the previous Woodrum Committee hearings having framed the debate entirely in terms of the War Department plan.

Proponents of the War Department's plan repeatedly emphasized the cost savings it would provide.

==== Truman Intervenes ====
On December 19, Truman let Congress know his own thoughts on unification. They mirrored the War Department plan in all respects.

The hearings concluded as Congress went into its Christmas recess with the two departments and their congressional allies at an impasse.

=== Navy and Marine Corps Resistance ===
Over the course of the 1945 hearings, Navy and Marine Corps resistance to the War Department plan began to coalesce.

==== SCOROR ====
In October, on the advice of Admiral Radford, Forrestal created the Secretary's Committee on Research on Reorganization (SCOROR) to track unification developments and help manage the Navy's response. The same month, Forrestal asked Sen. David Walsh, the chairman of the Naval Affairs Committee, to hold hearings of his own so that the Navy would have a chance to properly present their counterargument to the War Department Proposal.

==== First Marine Corps Board ====
At the same time, the commandant directed the head of Marine Corps Schools, Merrill Twining, to create a Marine Corps Board to do the same for the Marine Corps.

=== The Thomas Plan ===
In January 1946, Senator Elbert D. Thomas formed a subcommittee within the Senate Military Affairs Committee to draft unification legislation. The subcommittee included Vice Admiral Arthur Radford and Major General Lauris Norstad as advisors from the Department of the Navy and the War Department. On April 9, the subcommittee introduced the bill, S. 2044. Its key points were the following:

- Replacing the Navy and War Departments with a single "Department of Common Defense" led by a civilian secretary with one undersecretary and four assistant secretaries.
- Creating an independent air force under the new department.
- Creating a "Joint Staff of the Armed Forces" made up of the three service chiefs plus a chief of staff to submit recommendations and non-concurrences once a year to the president through the secretary of defense.
- Creating a "Council of Common Defense" based on Eberstadt's concept for a National Security Council.
- Creating a National Security Resources Board.
- Creating a Central Intelligence Agency.

==== JCS 1478 ====
On March 15 and 16, Army Air Corps Commanding General Carl Spaatz and Army Chief of Staff Dwight Eisenhower wrote two papers regarding unification JCS 1478/10 and 1478/11, that dealt with Army objectives for postwar unification. Marked "TOP SECRET", the two papers were blunt in their statement of their intent to marginalize the Marine Corps. The Eisenhower-Spaatz proposal's key points were the following:

- Limit Marine Corps units to the size of regiments and below, and cap the total size of the Marine Corps at 50,000-60,000.
- Bar the Marine Corps from wartime expansion, eliminating the need for the Marine Corps Reserve.
- Limit Marine Corps missions to guarding naval ships and shore establishments.
- Limit Marines to participating "only in minor shore combat operations in which the Navy alone is interested."
- Bar the Marine Corps from engaging in operations that required combined arms since this would duplicate the functions of the Army and Air Force.

The papers were forwarded to the chief of naval operations, Admiral Chester Nimitz, for his thoughts. There the papers came to the attention of Merritt Edson, the Marine Corps liaison to the chief of naval operations. Edson alerted the commandant of the Marine Corps and the members of the Marine Corps Board, most of whom, particularly Merrill Twining, believed that the only purpose of the papers' high classification was to conceal the Army's goals from Congress.

Nimitz replied on March 30th, and included responses by the commandant and by the head of Naval Aviation, both of whom were strongly against the proposals.

==== Lobbying and gag order ====
Following the bill's introduction, the Department of the Navy openly opposed it.

In a press conference on April 11, Truman said he had not authorized Navy officers to speak against unification, only to offer their honest opinions. He demanded that members of both the War Department and Department of the Navy "get in line" behind the official White House policy. When questioned about Army lobbying tactics, Truman claimed ignorance, but stated he was opposed to all congressional lobbying by the two departments.

On April 30, the Senate Naval Affairs Committee began hearings to consider S. 2044.

==== The Bended Knee Speech ====
On May 6, Commandant of the Marine Corps Alexander Vandegrift testified. His testimony noted that on multiple occasions there had been efforts to marginalize and disband the Marine Corps, all of which had been ended by congressional oversight. He noted Marine Corps successes such as the prediction of the course of the Pacific War by Pete Ellis, and a history of extreme frugality that did not characterize other services. Finally, he denounced the War Department plan as a transparent attempt to quietly marginalize and disband the Marine Corps by removing its congressional protection.

==== Defeat ====
On May 7, Clark Clifford, Truman's lead for unification legislation, told General Norstad and Assistant Secretary of War Stuart Symington that the Thomas Bill could not pass in its current form, and that the Naval Affairs Committee hearings were causing it to lose more support every day. He also admitted he had been swayed by some of the Navy's objections, especially regarding the role of the chief of staff. Clifford recommended that Truman meet with the secretaries of War and the Navy and their advisors to clarify points of agreement and disagreement and find a way forward.

On May 13, Truman held the meeting, and demanded that Patterson and Forrestal find a way to break the impasse by the end of the month due to the urgency of passing unification legislation. He also said that he had accepted the Navy's arguments against the chief of staff. Finally, he told his chief of staff, Admiral William Leahy, to silence criticism of unification by naval officers.

On May 31, Patterson and Forrestal reported to him that of the twelve points in S. 2044 they agreed on eight and disagreed on four. The points of agreement were as follows:

- That there should not be a single military chief of staff
- The creation of a permanent Joint Chiefs of Staff
- The creation of a Council of Common Defense
- The creation of a Central Intelligence Agency
- The creation of a National Security Resources Board
- The creation of an agency for joint military education and training
- The creation of an agency for joint research
- The creation of an agency for procurement and supply.

The remaining points of disagreement were the following:

- Whether or not to reorganize into a single Department of Defense
- Whether or not to establish a separate Air Force
- The status of Army and Navy aviation
- The status of the Marine Corps

The period of rival Military Affairs Committee and Naval Affairs Committee hearings came to an end for good on August 2, when Truman signed the Legislative Reorganization Act of 1946. It combined the Military Affairs and Naval Affairs Committees into Armed Services Committees in the House and Senate, and would go into effect for the 80th United States Congress.

Additionally, in August, Thomas suggested to Truman that he use an executive order to execute some unification changes, for example by creating a Council of Common Defense led by Secretary of State James F. Byrnes. Thomas believed that forcing the military to operate under unification for several months might convince all involved, particularly Congress, that unification legislation was feasible.

=== The Patterson-Forrestal Compromise ===
On November 7, 1946, Forrestal called a meeting at his home with Army and Navy representatives to attempt to find a way forward. The attendees included the two departments' primary negotiators Norstad and Radford, Assistant Secretary of War for Air Stuart Symington, and Forrestal's friend Admiral Forrest Sherman. The main outcome of the meeting was the replacement of Admiral Radford as the Navy's primary negotiator with Forrestal's friend Vice Admiral Forrest Sherman. According to Marine Corps Brigadier General Gerald Thomas, this was due to Patterson's suggestion since the Army found Radford difficult to work with.

On January 16, 1947, Norstad, Sherman, and Symington forwarded a letter to the White House with an outline of a joint Army-Navy agreement.

==== Second Marine Corps Board ====
Vandegrift and the other Marines involved with unification believed they had been betrayed. Admiral Radford had been a close ally of the Marine Corps, and Admiral Sherman was not. There had been no Marine Corps input into the Patterson-Forrestal Compromise, and many Marines, Vandegrift included, believed Sherman had cut a deal with Norstad to preserve Navy aviation in exchange for abandoning demands for statutory protections of the Marine Corps.

The same month the Patterson-Forrestal Compromise went to the White House, Vandegrift appointed a second Marine Corps board to "Conduct Research and Prepare Material in Connection with Pending Legislation" led by Merritt Edson and Gerald C. Thomas. Other members formally appointed to the board in writing included Col Merrill Twining, Col Edward Dyer, LtCol Victor Krulak, LtCol Samuel Shaw, LtCol DeWolf Schatzel, LtCol James C. Murray, LtCol James Hittle, LtCol Edward Hurst, LtCol Robert Heinl, and Maj Jonas Platt.

== Legislative history ==
When Congress convened, it had preemptively restructured in favor of unification. Due to the Legislative Reorganization Act of 1946, in the 80th Congress the Military and Naval Affairs Committees had been combined into unified Armed Services Committees in both the House and Senate.

On February 26, 1947, President Harry S. Truman sent a bill proposal to Congress detailing the creation of a "National Defense Establishment". Representative Clare E. Hoffman (R-MI) introduced the bill as H.R. 2319 to the House of Representatives on February 28, 1947; it was then referred to the Committee on Expenditures in the Executive Departments.

Senator Chan Gurney (R-SD) introduced the bill to the Senate as S. 758 on March 3, 1947. Due to conflict over which committee the bill was to be referred to, as well as the focus the Senate had on the legislative budget at the time, the bill was not able to be introduced in the Senate sooner.

=== Congressional hearings ===
On March 18, 1947, then-Chairman Senator Gurney held congressional hearings in the Senate Committee on Armed Services on the bill that would become the National Security Act of 1947. The hearings were held in three parts: Part 1 hearings were held on March 18, March 20, March 25, March 26, and April 1–3, 1947; Part 2 hearings were held on April 8, April 9, April 15, April 18, April 22, April 24, and April 25, 1947; and Part 3 hearings were held on April 30, May 2, May 6, May 7, and May 9, 1947.

The witnesses at the hearings largely spoke in support of the bill, either overall or with adjustments. Major witnesses of the bill who spoke in support were United States Army chief of staff General Dwight D. Eisenhower, Secretary of the Navy James V. Forrestal, Secretary of War Robert P. Patterson, Chief of Naval Operations Admiral Chester W. Nimitz, Under Secretary of War Kenneth C. Royall, Representative Walter G. Andrews (R-NY), Senator Henry Cabot Lodge (R-MA), two colonels from the Reserve Officers Association of the United States, Director of Central Intelligence Hoyt S. Vandenberg, Director of the Bureau of the Budget James E. Webb, and president of General Electric Co. Charles E. Wilson. Assistant Secretary of the Navy W. John Kenney spoke in support but expressed concerns about appropriations, while United States Army Surgeon General Norman T. Kirk expressed concern about the role of medical services. Former senator Thomas C. Hart (R-CT) opposed the bill and proposed changes to the areas concerning the Navy and the Marine Corps. The president of the Marine Reserve Officers Association, Melvin J. Maas, stated that 95% of the Association opposes the bill and requests adjustments as it comes to the Marine Corps' role. The president of the Reserve Officers of the Naval Services (RONS), John P. Bracken, stated that the organization opposed the bill due to the lack of input they were allowed to give. Representatives from the National Guard Association opposed the bill as it stood and said that the role of the National Guard needed to be improved.

On April 24, Edson requested to retire in order to be permitted to present his personal views against the bill, but the Commandant denied his request.

On May 6, the second Marine Corps Board was dissolved.

The next day, at the invitation of a member of the committee, Merritt Edson testified in opposition to the bill. He was the only active duty military officer to do so.

On June 7, Edson submitted a second request to retire, and this one was accepted. On June 17, Edson testified before the committee again.

=== Executive Order 9877 ===
Following the congressional hearings, on June 6, Truman published Executive Order 9877, which explicitly prescribed the functions of each of the military services.

=== Debates ===
On July 7, 1947, the National Security Act of 1947 was debated for the first time in the Senate, two days after the Senate Committee on Armed Services reported the bill to the Senate. On July 9, 1947, the Senate continued debates and, with an amendment to the title, passed the bill by a voice vote.

On July 15, 1947, having already been passed in the Senate, the National Security Act of 1947 was debated in the House of Representatives. The House introduced Resolution 80 H.Con.Res. 70 on the same day. The Senate agreed to the Resolution on July 16, 1947. The House debated and passed the National Security Act of 1947, along with 80 H.R. 4214, on July 19, 1947. The conference report 80 H. rp. 1051 was agreed to in the Senate on July 24, 1947, and was agreed to in the House on July 25, 1947. The recorded votes on the bill itself "drew strong bipartisan support."

==== Senate ====
During the July 7, 1947, and July 9, 1947, debates in the Senate, members of the Senate Committee on Armed Services spoke the most, with major proponents being senators Lodge (R-MA), Saltonstall (R-MA), Baldwin (R-CT), Morse (R-OR), Tydings (D-MD), Maybank (D-SC), and Hill (D-AL). Arguments in support of the bill included Senator Gurney's reasoning that there were "personnel problems in the Army and Navy, including the Air Forces" and that "the unification bill is a sincere and earnest attempt to put into effect by legislation a security organization which is adequate, effective, modern – and yet economical."

Senator Robertson (R-WY) was a staunch opponent of the bill, arguing that the bill would cost the country too much considering it would not be able to make the armed services any more efficient, and that the secretary of defense would have too much power.

Senator Robertson offered three amendments during debates, all of which were defeated by voice vote. Senator McCarthy (R-WI) offered an amendment that stipulated that the "existing status of Marine Corps and Naval Aviation not to be altered or diminished; their existing functions not to be transferred to other services"; the Senate debated this amendment the most until it was defeated by a 52–19 roll call vote. The only amendment that passed (by voice vote) in the Senate was offered by Senator Taft (R-OH) in which the National Security Council was to only be focused on national security matters.

==== House of Representatives ====
During the July 15, 1947, and July 19, 1947, debates in the House of Representatives, major proponents of the National Security Act of 1947 included representatives Wadsworth (R-NY), McCormack (D-MA), and Manasco (D-AL), who were all on the Expenditures Committee as high-ranking members, and the House Armed Services Committee Chairman Walter G. Andrews (R-NY).

Opponents of the bill in the House included Representatives Cole (R-NY), Sheppard (D-CA), Rogers (R-MA), and Taber (R-NY). Representatives Cole, Sheppard, and Rogers argued that the Navy did not have enough protections under the bill, while Representative Taber argued against the budgetary aspect.

Minor amendments were passed during debates in the House. Some of Representative Cole's amendments protecting the Navy and limiting the secretary of defense's powers were passed by voice vote (though others he offered were defeated). Representatives Judd (R-MN) and Brown (R-OH) were able to pass amendments by voice votes that required the director of central intelligence to be appointed by the president from civilian life and confirmed by the Senate, and Representative Judd passed an amendment allowing the Federal Bureau of Investigation and the Atomic Energy Commission to conduct secret operations without the inspection of the director of central intelligence. Amendments offered by representatives MacKinnon (R-MN), Case (R-NJ), Mitchell (R-IN), Clason (R-MA), and Owens (R-IL) were defeated.

=== Enactment ===
The Act was signed into law by President Truman on July 26, 1947. The bill signing took place aboard Truman's VC-54C presidential aircraft Sacred Cow, the first aircraft used for the role of Air Force One. The president was traveling to be at the bedside of his dying mother and delayed his departure until the bill was signed.

The majority of the provisions of the act took effect on September 18, 1947, the day after the Senate confirmed James Forrestal as the first secretary of defense. His power was initially limited and it was difficult for him to exercise the authority to make his office effective. This was later changed in the amendment to the act in 1949, creating what was to be the Department of Defense.

=== Provisions ===
The legislation's definition of covert action was vague, limiting oversight over the CIA's activities. It was only in the 1990s that Congress attempted to regulate covert action by prohibiting certain forms of it and enacting substantive and procedural rules for covert action.

==== Title I – Coordination for National Security ====
Title I worked to establish the National Security Council, an advisory council to the president for matters relating to national security in the realm of "domestic, foreign, and military policies" with the intent of allowing for the military departments to communicate with more efficiency. It also established the Central Intelligence Agency (CIA) under the National Security Council, led by the Director of Central Intelligence. The role of the director of central intelligence, and the CIA as a whole, is as an advisory unit to the National Security Council and as a coordinator of intelligence. Finally, Title I worked to establish the National Security Resources Board, an advisory board to the President on matters relating to "the coordination of military, industrial, and civilian mobilization."

==== Title II – The National Military Establishment ====
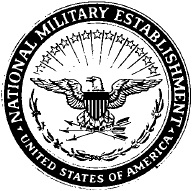
Seal of National Military Establishment (1947–1949), which was later renamed the Department of Defense

Outlined the establishment of the National Military Establishment (NME), which consists of the Department of the Army, the Department of the Navy, and the Department of the Air Force (DAF) and is led by the secretary of defense.

Designated the Department of War to be renamed the Department of the Army, led by the secretary of the Army.

Established the Department of the Navy and outlined it to consist of the United States Marine Corps, the United States Navy, and the United States Coast Guard. The role of the United States Marine Corps was further outlined.

Established the DAF, led by the secretary of the Air Force, and allowed the secretary of defense to designate any and all functions that they deem fit to be under the DAF.

Seal of the Department of the Air Force, established by the Act

Created the United States Air Force as an agency of aviation offense and defense under the DAF, led by a chief of staff of the United States Air Force, who in turn is directed by the secretary of the Air Force. The chief of staff, United States Air Force, was designated as having equal authority as the chief of staff of the United States Army and the chief of naval operations.

Established the War Council as an advisory council to the secretary of defense within the NME. The War Council consists of the secretary of defense, the secretaries of the Army, the Navy, and the Air Force, the chief of naval operations, and the chiefs of staff of the United States Army and the United States Air Force.

Title II established the Joint Chiefs of Staff within the NME as consisting "of the Chief of Staff, United States Army; the Chief of Naval Operations; the Chief of Staff, United States Air Force; and the Chief of Staff to the Commander in Chief, if there be one" with the role of being "the principal military advisers to the President and the Secretary of Defense." It also created a Joint Staff under the Joint Chiefs of Staff.

Created a Munitions Board within the NBE, which replaced the Joint Army and Navy Munitions Board, led by a chairman and consisted of under secretaries or assistant secretaries from the Department of the Army, the Department of the Navy, and the Department of the Air Force.

Established a Research and Development Board within the NME, which replaces the Joint Research and Development Board, and that consists of a chairman with two representatives from each military department. The Research and Development Board acts as an advisory unit on matters relating to and the conducting of military research.

==== Title III – Miscellaneous ====
Designated compensation for each of the positions created under the act, designate relative classification statuses, and specify the transfer of funds and resources.

Defined "function" as including "functions, powers, and duties", and defines "budget program" as "recommendations as to the apportionment, to the allocation and to the review of allotments of appropriated funds".

Specified separability and established the timeline of when provisions of the act would be in effect.

Amended the July 18, 1947, Presidential Succession Act to remove "Secretary of the Navy" and to replace "Secretary of War" with "Secretary of Defense".

== Results ==
The act produced mixed results, and both sides of the unification fight would see their positions partly vindicated and partly tested over the next few years.

=== Cost savings ===
The promised cost savings were fleeting and arguable. Even before the act was passed, the military's total budget ceiling had been cut by two thirds. The first year after the act, Truman cut the budget again by several billion dollars, however the defense budget had returned to its previous level by the next year. If the act saved money, it was obscured by an immediate return to high defense budgets following the Soviet development of nuclear weapons and the beginning of the Korean War.

=== Elimination of duplication ===
The act was partially successful in eliminating duplication. One example was the combination of the Air Force's Air Transport Command and the Navy's Naval Air Transport Service into the Military Air Transport Service on June 1, 1948.

=== Joint operations ===
Among the services, the problems of joint operations remained bad. Rather than leading to streamlined joint operations, the Act preceded a heightened period of interservice rivalries and service parochialism. It included fights between the Army and Air Force over close air support, fights between the Air Force and Navy over development of carriers vs. development of strategic bombing capabilities, and additional attempts to marginalize the Marine Corps by both the Army and Navy. Following joint operations problems in the Iranian hostage rescue in 1980 and United States invasion of Grenada in 1983, Congress would pass a second vast reorganization in the Goldwater–Nichols Department of Defense Reorganization Act in 1986.

=== Secretary of Defense ===
As the first secretary of defense over the National Military Establishment, Forrestal had to live with the watered-down secretary of defense powers he had fought for as the secretary of the Navy. He found it left him unable to control the military services. Forrestal spent the remainder of his tenure as secretary of defense working to have the act amended.

=== President ===
Truman had succeeded in establishing a permanent and more centralized Department of Defense. General Douglas MacArthur pursued the Republican nomination for president even while still in uniform, and Truman would ultimately relieve MacArthur for insubordination during the Korean War in 1951. The relief of the highly popular general preceded a drop in Truman's approval rating to 22%. Though Truman ultimately decided not to run in the 1952 presidential election, had he run it would have been against Eisenhower, another highly popular Army general, who retired from active service only to accept the Republican nomination.

=== Army ===
The new Air Force focused on strategic bombing and air superiority to the exclusion of almost all else, which left the Army dissatisfied with the attention paid to transportation and close air support of troops on the ground. Helicopters emerged as an Army alternative to absent support from the Air Force. By the end of 1952, the secretary of the Army and secretary of the Air Force had signed the Pace-Finletter memorandum of understanding that removed all weight limits on helicopters the Army could operate and allowed use of fixed-wing aircraft up to 5,000 lb. Army-owned helicopters proliferated during the Vietnam War. Finally, in 1983, with the establishment of the United States Army Aviation Branch to more effectively oversee the Army's numerous helicopters, the Army had effectively recreated the Army Air Forces.

=== Navy ===
The Department of the Navy had kept its aircraft and the Marine Corps had essentially saved itself, but the Navy almost immediately regretted unification. Following 1949 amendments that made the secretary of defense more than a powerless advisor, second secretary of defense Louis Johnson, an Army veteran, cancelled the aircraft carrier USS United States without consulting Congress. In an incident remembered as the Revolt of the Admirals, the secretary of the Navy resigned in protest, and naval officers began a lobbying war against a rival procurement program for the B-36 bomber.

=== Marine Corps ===
Within the Marine Corps, the fight to amend the Act was memorialized as one of the Marine Corps' finest hours, primarily by former members of the Marine Corps Board.

In September 1962, Robert Heinl wrote an account of the unification battle for Proceedings, and the Pentagon blocked its publication. Five days later, a Senate subcommittee began hearings regarding the Pentagon muzzling freedom of expression, and Strom Thurmond used the censorship of Heinl's article as evidence. When the Pentagon allowed the article's publication in October, it focused the media's attention on many of the negative statements about the Marine Corps made by Truman, Eisenhower, and others.

In 1984, Victor Krulak published an account of it in the book First to Fight, which has remained on the Commandant's Professional Reading List since it was first published.

== Amendments ==
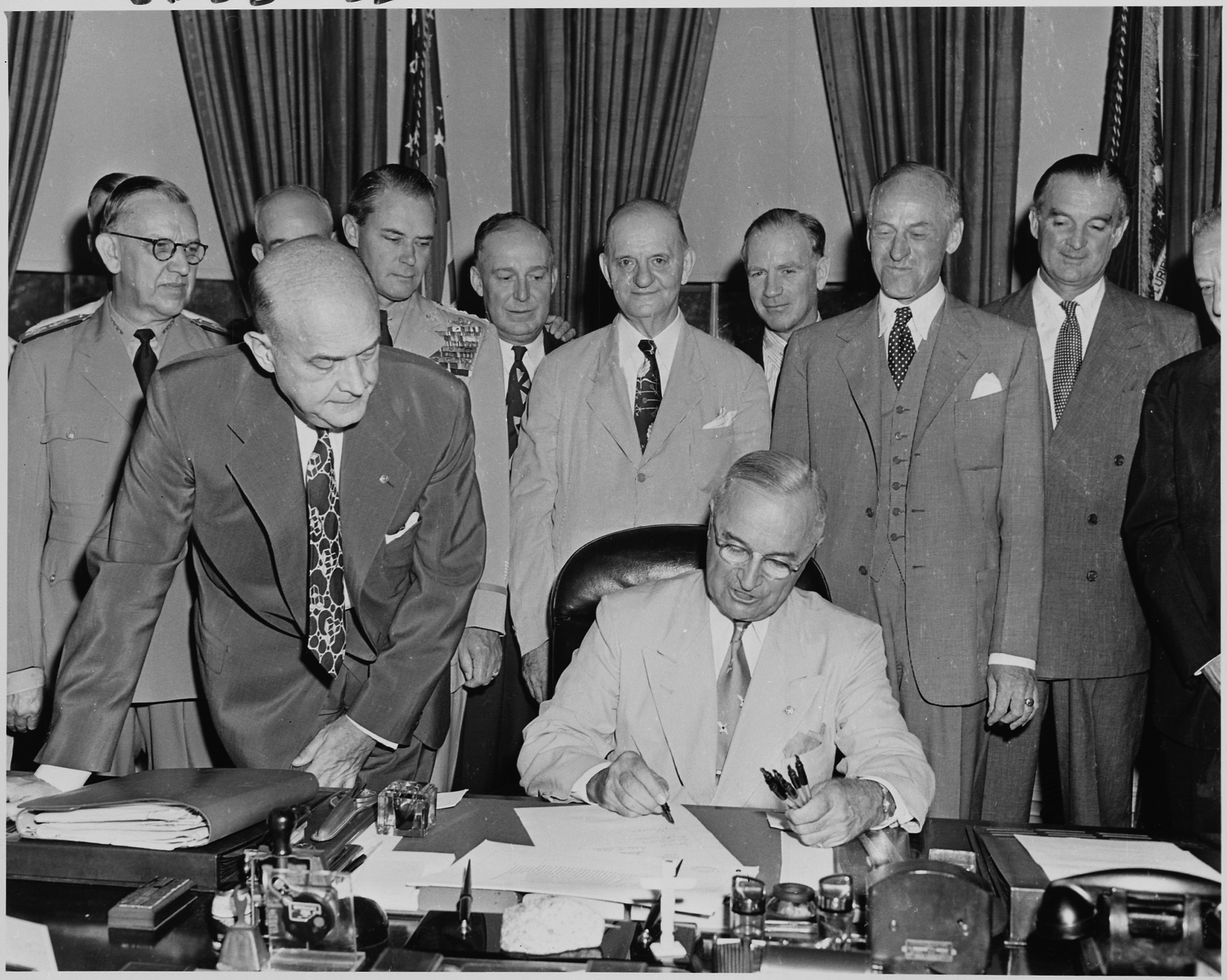
President Truman signs the National Security Act Amendment of 1949. Secretary of Defense Louis A. Johnson leans over the desk. Behind him is Admiral Louis Denfeld, General Omar N. Bradley, and General Hoyt Vandenberg.

On August 10, 1949, the act was amended. The amendments' key changes included the following:

- The National Military Establishment was converted into a Cabinet-level department and renamed the Department of Defense.
- The three military departments were placed under the authority of the secretary of defense.
- The secretaries of the three military departments lost their statutory access to the president, but gained statutory access to Congress.
- The secretaries of the three military departments lost their statutory membership in the National Security Council.
- The chief of staff to the commander in chief was replaced with a full-time chairman of the Joint Chiefs of Staff senior in rank to all other military officers.
- The War Council was renamed the Armed Forces Policy Council.

== See also ==
- Goldwater–Nichols Act, 1986 reorganization that greatly reworked the military command structure.
- Glomar response, term meaning to respond evasively to a question with the phrase "neither confirm nor deny", sometimes used for national security.
