= Project Candor =

1953 public relations campaign by U.S. President Dwight D. Eisenhower

- Date: April 1953 – December 1953
- Location: United States
- Participants: Dwight D. Eisenhower; C. D. Jackson (Special Assistant); Lewis Strauss (AEC Chairman); National Security Council; Psychological Strategy Board
- Outcome: Scrapping of proposed 6-part TV/radio broadcast campaign Formulation of the Atoms for Peace initiative Shift toward an international nuclear policy framework

Project Candor or Operation Candor was a public relations campaign run by the administration of Dwight D. Eisenhower in the Cold War. The thought behind the campaign was to inform the U.S. public about the America's nuclear arms race with the Soviet Union, and the U.S. government's analysis of it. The goal the government wanted to achieve from Project Candor was to have an "informed and careful public", which would also still support necessary actions of their government. The project set up a series of 6-minute nationwide radio and TV talks that were to be held by administration officials. The talks' introduction and conclusion were to be held by the President. The planning of the campaign began in the spring of 1953.

== Background ==
United States and Soviet Union/Russia nuclear weapon stockpiles

The background for Project Candor was that Eisenhower's administration found out of the nuclear weapons capabilities of the Soviet Union. When informed of their massive capabilities, Eisenhower became convinced that the U.S. public had a right to understand the dangers the US confronted in the USSR. This coincided with the January 1953 report of the State Department Panel of Consultants on Disarmament, which recommended that the U.S. government practice less secrecy and more honesty towards the American people about these realities. Eisenhower liked this recommendation of the report and it led directly to Operation Candor being formed.

In addition, Eisenhower needed U.S. public support on the great expenditure going to the government's nuclear arms race against the USSR. These talks would create understanding as to why the U.S. had to spend vast amounts on nuclear armament. Furthermore, by giving enough details regarding the huge arsenal of U.S. atomic weapons, Eisenhower and his administration hoped to deter the government in USSR and to reassure friendly nations of their security. Project Candor was planned to be a series of 6-minute, nationwide radio and TV talks introduced and concluded by the President, entitled "The Age of Peril". During these talks, prominent political figures (for instance Eisenhower himself) and government officials would discuss topics such as: "The nature of Communism", "The threat to the United States" and "Communism at home". There was disagreement within the administration as to both the message and timing of being "candid". Secretary of the Treasury George M. Humphrey stated fear regarding this: "telling the American people these grim facts before we[the government] were in a position to state concretely what steps the Government would take in building a defense against [an] atomic attack." On top of this, an operation called "candid" would supposedly imply that the government had been less candid earlier. Eisenhower's response revealed a somewhat idealistic approach to the project by claiming that a free government requires a well-informed public.

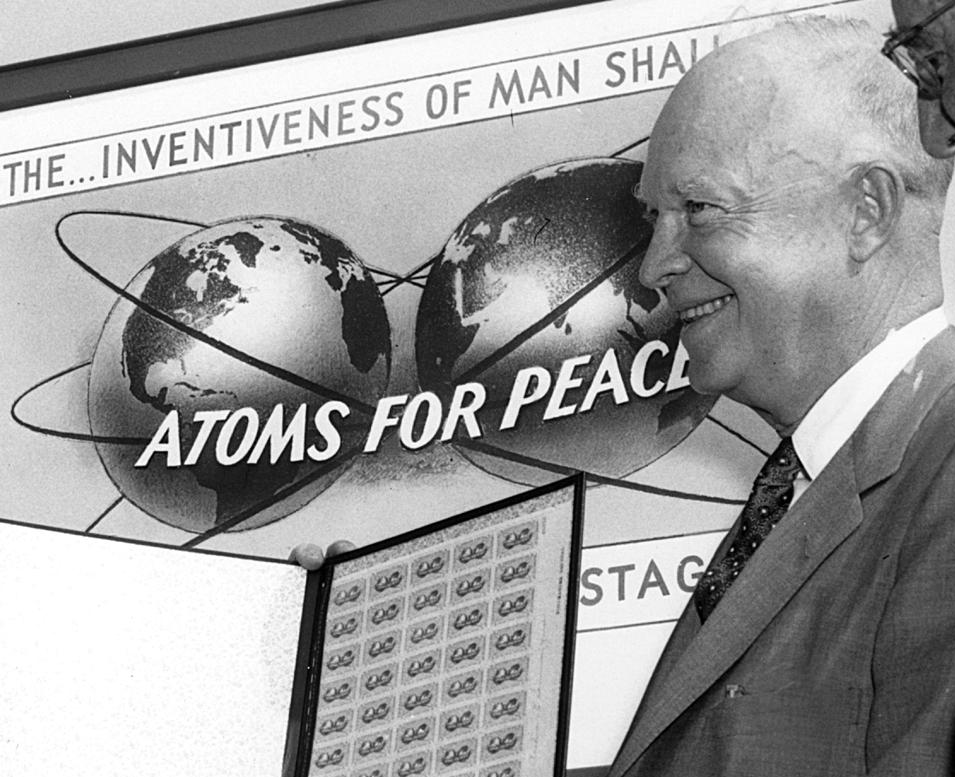
Dwight D. Eisenhower promoting the "Atoms for Peace" campaign in 1955

== Atoms for Peace ==
On December 8th, 1953, President Eisenhower delivered his “Atoms for Peace” speech before the United Nations General Assembly, suggesting international collaboration in the development of nuclear technology for civil purposes. The topics covered in this initiative were related to energy production, agriculture, and health. Eisenhower’s proposal eventually led to the establishment of the International Atomic Energy Agency in 1957. The campaign aspired to improve global perceptions of the United States during the Cold War by displaying the country as an advocate for peaceful use of nuclear technology.

The Atoms for Peace campaign was a part of Project Candor. Whereas Project Candor was more aimed at the U.S. public, the Atoms for Peace program was a global campaign aimed at convincing the world opinion that the U.S. was more interested in peace than war. Over time, the original Project Candor initiative evolved into Atoms for Peace as the administration reevaluated how they wanted to portray their message.

== See also ==
- Atomic Energy Act
- Atomic Weapons Rewards Act of 1955
- EURATOM Cooperation Act of 1958
