= John Sloan Dickey =

American diplomat, scholar, and intellectual

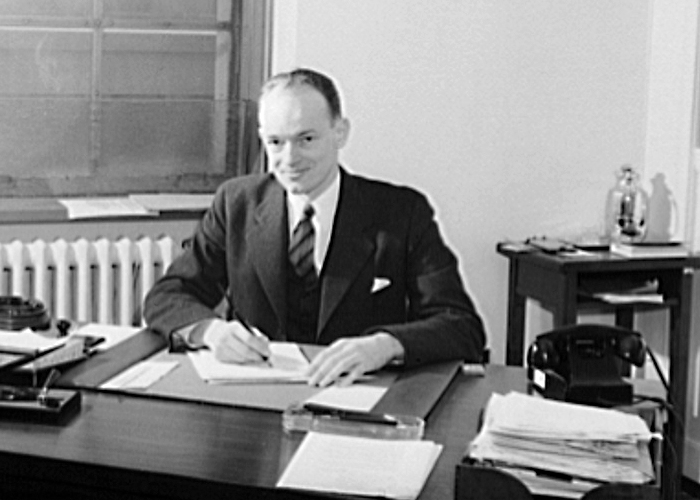
- Dickey in 1940

12th President of Dartmouth College
- In office 1945–1970
- Preceded by: Ernest Martin Hopkins
- Succeeded by: John George Kemeny

Personal details
- Born: November 4, 1907 Lock Haven, Pennsylvania, U.S.
- Died: February 9, 1991 (aged 83) Hanover, New Hampshire, U.S.
- Spouse: Christina Gillespie Dickey
- Education: Dartmouth College (BA); Harvard University (JD)

John Sloan Dickey (November 4, 1907 – February 9, 1991) was an American diplomat, scholar, and intellectual. Dickey served as the 12th President of Dartmouth College, Hanover, New Hampshire, from 1945 to 1970, and helped revitalize the Ivy League institution.

== Early life and education ==
Dickey was born in Lock Haven, Pennsylvania, on November 4, 1907. He completed his undergraduate degree at Dartmouth College in 1929, and later graduated from Harvard Law School.

== Career ==
Dickey had a varied career: partner at a major Boston law firm, special assistant to the Assistant Secretary of State and later to the Secretary of State, a member of the Office of the Coordinator of Inter-American Affairs and the division of World Trade Intelligence, and Director of the State Department's Office of Public Affairs.

Even after 1945, when Dickey became President of Dartmouth College, he remained a figure in public policy. He served on President Harry S. Truman's 1947 President's Committee on Civil Rights. A strong believer in the value of efforts towards international cooperation, he was part of the United Nations' Collective Measures Committee in 1951.

During 1952–53, he was one of five members chosen by Secretary of State Dean Acheson for the State Department Panel of Consultants on Disarmament, and he played a significant role in the panel's stark report about the dangers of nuclear weapons and relations with the Soviet Union.

=== Dartmouth College president ===
Dickey served as the 12th President of Dartmouth College from 1945 to 1970. Regularly welcoming freshmen at Convocation with the phrase "your business here is learning," Dickey was committed to making Dartmouth College the nation's best liberal arts college.

Dickey's commitment to the liberal arts, or, as he termed them "the liberating arts," was perhaps best expressed in an innovative course on "Great Issues," designed to introduce seniors to the problems of national and international relations they would face as citizens. President Dickey also reintroduced doctoral programs to Dartmouth, and a Northern Studies program and a Russian Civilization department. Dickey sought to expand the horizons of Dartmouth beyond Hanover and introduced foreign studies programs, a public affairs internship, and various social action programs. The William Jewett Tucker Foundation was opened by President Dickey, offering students opportunity and academic credit for social activism.

During his 25-year tenure, Dickey headed two capital campaigns, doubled African American student enrollment, reinvigorated Dartmouth Medical School, built the Hopkins Center and instituted continuing education for alumni. Consistent with his concern for, awareness of, and involvement in the great movements of the time, he saw the emerging importance of computers, a field then in its infancy, and built the Kiewit Computation Center in 1966. After stepping down as president, he continued his affiliation with the college by teaching Canadian-American relations as the Bicentennial Professor of Public Affairs.

In 1982, the John Sloan Dickey Center for International Understanding was opened at Dartmouth to honor Dickey's legacy and "coordinate, sustain, and enrich the international dimension of liberal arts education at Dartmouth."
