= Chick Kam Choo v. Exxon Corp. =

- Supreme Court of the United States

Argued March 30, 1988 Decided May 16, 1988
- Full case name: Chick Kam Choo v. Exxon Corp.
- Citations: 486 U.S. 140 (more) 108 S. Ct. 1684; 100 L. Ed. 2d 127

Holding
- Because the District Court's injunction barring the state court proceedings is broader than is necessary "to protect or effectuate" that court's 1980 judgment dismissing petitioner's lawsuit from federal court, this case must be remanded for the entry of a more narrowly tailored order.

Court membership
- Chief Justice William Rehnquist Associate Justices William J. Brennan Jr. · Byron White; Thurgood Marshall · Harry Blackmun; John P. Stevens · Sandra Day O'Connor; Antonin Scalia · Anthony Kennedy

Case opinions
- Majority: O'Connor, joined by unanimous
- Concurrence: White

Laws applied
- 28 U.S.C. § 2283

Chick Kam Choo v. Exxon Corp., 486 U.S. 140 (1988), was a United States Supreme Court case in which the Court held that a federal court's dismissal of a civil action on the ground that it should be heard in a foreign court, under the doctrine of forum non conveniens, does not preclude the plaintiff from filing the same action in a state court that applies different forum non conveniens rules.

== Background and lower-court proceedings ==
In 1977, a resident of Singapore died in a workplace accident while working for a subsidiary of Exxon. His widow, Chick Kam Choo, sued Exxon and other defendants in the United States District Court for the Southern District of Texas, asserting claims for wrongful death under federal and state law. The defendants moved to dismiss the claims on substantive grounds and on the basis of forum non conveniens. The court dismissed the federal statutory claims on their merits and dismissed the balance of the suit based on grounds of forum non conveniens, finding that the case should be litigated in Singapore rather than the United States. On appeal, the United States Court of Appeals for the Fifth Circuit affirmed the dismissal.

Chick Kam Choo then re-filed her suit in a Texas state court. She sought to re-assert her federal and state-law claims, but soon voluntarily dismissed the federal claims. Exxon then returned to federal court and asked the District Court to grant an injunction prohibiting Chick Kam Choo from relitigating in state court the issues that had already been resolved against her in federal court. The District Court granted an injunction against Chick Kam Choo's pursuing any claims in state court relating to her husband's death. Chick Kam Choo appealed, asserting that this restriction violated the Anti-Injunction Act, 28 U.S.C. § 2283. A three-judge Fifth Circuit panel affirmed the injunction with one judge dissenting.

Chick Kam Choo sought review by the Supreme Court, which granted certiorari.

== Opinion of the Court ==
The Supreme Court modified the Fifth Circuit's decision in a unanimous opinion authored by Justice Sandra Day O'Connor. She noted that under the Anti-Injunction Act, Congress instructed the federal courts not to enjoin legal proceedings in state courts, except under narrow circumstances. One of the authorized exceptions is where an injunction is necessary to protect or effectuate the federal court's judgment. This "relitigation exception was designed to permit a federal court to prevent state litigation of an issue that was previously presented to and decided by the federal court" and is "founded in the well recognized concepts of res judicata and collateral estoppel."

Here, with respect to Chick Kam Choo's state-law wrongful death claim, the federal court's forum non conveniens determination that the case should be heard in Singapore rather than Texas did not preclude re-filing of the claim in Texas state court. Unlike the federal courts, which decide forum non conveniens motions based on a balancing of relevant factors, Texas state courts are bound by an "open courts" provision contained in the Texas State Constitution. Thus, "the only issue decided by the District Court was that [Chick Kam Choo's] claims should be dismissed under the federal forum non conveniens doctrine. Federal forum non conveniens principles simply cannot determine whether Texas courts ... which operate under a broad 'open courts' mandate, would consider themselves an appropriate forum for petitioner's lawsuit." Therefore, "whether the Texas state courts [were] an appropriate forum for petitioner's Singapore law claims [had] not yet been litigated, and an injunction to foreclose consideration of that issue [was] not within the relitigation exception."

The Court also rejected Exxon's argument that the state court was bound by the federal-court forum non conveniens decision because the case involved issues of federal maritime law. However, the Court agreed with the Fifth Circuit that to the extent the prior federal decisions resolved a choice of law issue in the case—determining that Singapore law, rather than Texas law, applied to the wrongful death claim—the Texas courts were bound by that determination.

=== Concurring opinion ===
Justice White filed a short concurring opinion. While agreeing with the Court's analysis and result, he opined that if the federal court had specifically held that federal maritime law required that the case be heard in Singapore, such a determination could have warranted preclusive effect.
