= Wheat v. United States =

- Supreme Court of the United States

Decided May 23, 1988
- Full case name: Wheat v. United States
- Citations: 486 U.S. 153 (more)

Holding
- Notwithstanding the right to choice of counsel, the trial court has significant discretion to deny a criminal defendant's waiver of a conflict of interest with their chosen lawyer.

Court membership
- Chief Justice William Rehnquist Associate Justices William J. Brennan Jr. · Byron White; Thurgood Marshall · Harry Blackmun; John P. Stevens · Sandra Day O'Connor; Antonin Scalia · Anthony Kennedy

Case opinions
- Majority: Rehnquist
- Dissent: Marshall, joined by Brennan
- Dissent: Stevens, joined by Blackmun

Wheat v. United States, 486 U.S. 153 (1988), was a United States Supreme Court case in which the court held that, notwithstanding the right to choice of counsel, the trial court has significant discretion to deny a criminal defendant's waiver of a conflict of interest with their chosen lawyer.

== Background ==
Wheat, along with numerous codefendants including Gomez-Barajas and Bravo, was charged with participating in a far-flung drug distribution conspiracy. At the time of Wheat's trial, the federal District Court was considering Gomez-Barajas's offer to plead guilty to certain charges stemming from the conspiracy and had already accepted Bravo's guilty plea to one count. Both Gomez-Barajas and Bravo were represented by attorney Iredale. Two court days before his trial was to commence, Wheat moved for the substitution of Iredale as his counsel as well. Despite Wheat's assertion of his Sixth Amendment right to the counsel of his choice, and his willingness, as well as that of Gomez-Barajas and Bravo, to waive the right to conflict-free counsel, the court denied the substitution motion on the basis of irreconcilable and unwaiveable conflicts of interest for Iredale created by the likelihood that petitioner would be called to testify at any subsequent trial of Gomez-Barajas, and that Bravo would testify at petitioner's trial. Wheat therefore proceeded to trial with his original counsel and was convicted. The Ninth Circuit Court of Appeals affirmed.

== Opinion of the court ==
The Supreme Court issued an opinion on May 23, 1988.
