= Berkovitz v. United States =

- Supreme Court of the United States

Argued April 19, 1988 Decided June 13, 1988
- Full case name: Berkovitz v. United States
- Citations: 486 U.S. 531 (more)

Court membership
- Chief Justice William Rehnquist Associate Justices William J. Brennan Jr. · Byron White; Thurgood Marshall · Harry Blackmun; John P. Stevens · Sandra Day O'Connor; Antonin Scalia · Anthony Kennedy

Case opinion
- Majority: Marshall, joined by unanimous

Laws applied
- Federal Tort Claims Act

Berkovitz v. United States, 486 U.S. 531 (1988), is a decision of the Supreme Court of the United States clarifying the scope of the discretionary function exception under the Federal Tort Claims Act (FTCA). The Court held that the United States may be liable for negligence when federal employees violate mandatory duties imposed by statute or regulation, even in the context of a regulatory program.

== Facts ==
Petitioner Kevan Berkovitz, a two-month-old infant, contracted a severe case of polio after ingesting a dose of Orimune, an oral polio vaccine manufactured by Lederle Laboratories. Berkovitz, joined by his parents, filed suit under the FTCA, alleging negligence by the Division of Biologic Standards (DBS) of the National Institutes of Health, which had licensed Lederle to produce Orimune, and by the Bureau of Biologics of the Food and Drug Administration (FDA), which had approved the release of the vaccine lot in question.

The FTCA generally allows suits against the federal government for torts committed by its employees, but excludes claims "based upon the exercise or performance or the failure to exercise or perform a discretionary function or duty." The district court denied the Government's motion to dismiss for lack of jurisdiction, but the Court of Appeals reversed, holding that licensing and release of polio vaccines were discretionary actions covered by the exception.

== Opinion of the Court ==
Justice Thurgood Marshall delivered the opinion of a unanimous court. The Court articulated a two-part test to determine whether the discretionary function exception applies:

1. Courts must ask whether the conduct at issue involved an element of judgment or choice. If a federal statute, regulation, or policy prescribes a specific course of action, there is no discretion, and the exception does not apply.
2. If the conduct is discretionary, courts must determine whether it is the kind of discretion the exception was designed to shield, namely discretion grounded in policy considerations.

Applying this test, the Court held:

- If the DBS licensed Orimune without first receiving required safety data, or without determining compliance with safety standards, it violated mandatory directives, and the exception does not apply.
- If the FDA knowingly released a vaccine lot contrary to its own mandatory policy of withholding unsafe lots, the conduct also would not be shielded.
- However, if the agencies merely made an incorrect determination of compliance, further proceedings were needed to assess whether such decisions were discretionary policy judgments.

The Court therefore reversed the Court of Appeals and remanded for further proceedings.

== Significance ==
Berkovitz clarified that federal agencies are not immune under the FTCA when they fail to follow specific statutory or regulatory mandates. The decision emphasized accountability in regulatory matters affecting public health and safety, reinforcing that the discretionary function exception does not extend to violations of mandatory duties. For its clarification of the scope of the discretionary function exception, it was described as "an important evolution in the interpretation of the exception". It emphasized that federal agencies must adhere to specific legal mandates and cannot claim immunity when failing to follow established safety regulations. This case reinforced the accountability of government agencies in regulatory matters, particularly those involving public health and safety.

Prior to Berkovitz, the leading cases were Dalehite v. United States, Indian Towing Co. v. United States, and United States v. Varig, as well as the Court's summary affirmance in Eastern Air Lines v. Union Trust Co.

Three years later, in United States v. Gaubert (1991), the Court clarified the second part of the Berkovitz test, holding that discretionary decisions grounded in policy considerations remain protected even within a regulatory framework.
