= Title 50 of the United States Code =

U.S. federal statutes on war and defense

Title 50 of the United States Code outlines the role of War and National Defense in the United States Code.

- Chapter 1: Council of National Defense
- Chapter 2: Board of Ordnance and Fortification (repealed)
- Chapter 3: Alien Enemies
- Chapter 4: Espionage (repealed/transferred)
- Chapter 4a: Photographing, Sketching, Mapping, Etc., Defensive Installations (repealed)
- Chapter 4b: Disclosure of Classified Information (repealed)
- Chapter 4c: Atomic Weapons and Special Nuclear Materials Information Rewards
- Chapter 5: Arsenals, Armories, Arms, And War Material Generally
- Chapter 6: Willful Destruction, Etc., Of War Or National-Defense Material (repealed)
- Chapter 7: Interference With Homing Pigeons Owned by United States (repealed)
- Chapter 8: Explosives; Manufacture, Distribution, Storage, Use, And Possession Regulated (repealed)
- Chapter 9: Aircraft (repealed/transferred/omitted)
- Chapter 10: Helium Gas
- Chapter 11: Acquisition Of And Expenditures On Land For National-Defense Purposes (repealed/transferred/omitted)
- Chapter 12: Vessels In Territorial Waters of United States
- Chapter 13: Insurrection
- Chapter 14: Wartime Voting by Land and Naval Forces (repealed)
- Chapter 15: National Security (transferred)
- Chapter 16: Defense Industrial Reserves
- Chapter 17: Arming American Vessels (repealed)
- Chapter 18: Air-Warning Screen
- Chapter 19: Guided Missiles
- Chapter 20: Wind Tunnels
- Chapter 21: Abacá Production (omitted)
- Chapter 22: Uniform Code of Military Justice Repealed – see Title 10 of the United States Code
- Chapter 22a: Representation Of Armed Forces Personnel Before Foreign Judicial Tribunals (repealed)
- Chapter 23: Internal Security
- Chapter 24: National Defense Facilities (repealed)
- Chapter 25: Armed Forces Reserve (repealed/omitted)
- Chapter 26: Gifts for Defense Purposes (repealed)
- Chapter 27: Reserve Officer Personnel Program (repealed/omitted)
- Chapter 28: Status of Armed Forces Personnel Appointed to Service Academies (repealed)
- Chapter 29: National Defense Contracts
- Chapter 30: Federal Absentee Voting Assistance (transferred)
- Chapter 31: Advisory Commission on Intergovernmental Relations (transferred)
- Chapter 32: Chemical and Biological Warfare Program
- Chapter 33: War Powers Resolution
- Chapter 34: National Emergencies
- Chapter 35: International Emergency Economic Powers
- Chapter 36: Foreign Intelligence Surveillance
- Chapter 37: National Security Scholarships, Fellowships, and Grants
- Chapter 38: Central Intelligence Agency Retirement and Disability
- Chapter 39: Spoils of War
- Chapter 40: Defense Against Weapons of Mass Destruction
- Chapter 41: National Nuclear Security Administration
- Chapter 42: Atomic Energy Defense Provisions
- Chapter 43: Preventing Weapons of Mass Destruction Proliferation and Terrorism
- Chapter 44: National Security
- Chapter 45: Miscellaneous Intelligence Community Authorities
- Chapter 46: Central Intelligence Agency
- Chapter 47: National Security Agency
- Chapter 48: Department of Defense Cooperative Threat Reduction
- Chapter 49: Military Selective Service
- Chapter 50: Servicemembers Civil Relief
- Chapter 51: War Claims
- Chapter 52: Restitution for World War II Internment of Japanese Americans and Aleuts
- Chapter 53: Trading with the Enemy
- Chapter 54: Merchant Ship Sales (repealed/transferred)
- Chapter 55: Defense Production Act
- Chapter 56: Export Administration
- Chapter 57: Claims Under the Clarification Act
- Chapter 58: Export Control Reform
