= State Department Panel of Consultants on Disarmament =

The State Department Panel of Consultants on Disarmament, sometimes referred to as the Oppenheimer Panel, was a group created by the United States Department of State that existed from April 1952 to January 1953, during the last year of the Truman administration. It was composed of prominent figures from science, law, education, and the government, and chaired by physicist J. Robert Oppenheimer. Its purpose was to make recommendations regarding U.S. disarmament policy in the context of the Cold War.

The panel's initial recommendation represented a last attempt to forestall the advent of thermonuclear weapons by urging the U.S. government to not undertake a first test of the hydrogen bomb. This recommendation was not followed and the test went ahead as planned in the fall of 1952. The panel subsequently made a series of recommendations regarding U.S. policy towards nuclear weapons and relations with the Soviet Union. One recommendation, advocating that the U.S. government practice less secrecy and more openness towards the American people about the realities of the nuclear balance and the dangers of nuclear warfare, attracted the interest of the new Eisenhower administration and led to that administration's Operation Candor and Atoms for Peace initiatives during 1953.

== Background ==
Following the first atomic bomb test by the Soviet Union in August 1949, there was an intense debate within the U.S. government, military, and scientific communities regarding whether to proceed with development of the far more powerful hydrogen bomb, a debate that was decided on January 31, 1950, when President Harry S. Truman gave the order to go ahead with the new weapon. At the time, creation of a thermonuclear device was by no means assured, since initial ideas for how to create one had proved unfruitful. However, beginning with the Teller–Ulam design breakthrough in March 1951, there was steady progress and by 1952 there were additional resources devoted to staging, and political pressure towards seeing, an actual test of a hydrogen bomb.

Although defeated in January 1950, the opponents of the hydrogen bomb did not give up, instead continuing to fight a battle against the new weapon in different forms, and on different fronts, over the next several years.

== The panel ==
The creation of the Panel of Consultants on Disarmament was announced by the State Department on April 28, 1952. The panel was commissioned by Secretary of State Dean Acheson and its purpose was to advise the State Department and other federal agencies regarding U.S. disarmament policy and the U.S. role within the United Nations Disarmament Commission. In particular, the panel members met with officials from the State Department, the U.S. Department of Defense, the Atomic Energy Commission (AEC), as well as with U.S. representatives to the UN commission.

The five members of the panel, and their organizational affiliations at the time of its establishment, were:

- J. Robert Oppenheimer, Director, Institute for Advanced Study
- Vannevar Bush, Carnegie Institution of Washington
- John Sloan Dickey, President of Dartmouth College
- Allen Dulles, Deputy Director of the Central Intelligence Agency
- Joseph E. Johnson, Carnegie Endowment for International Peace

The two most prominent members were Oppenheimer, a physicist who as head of the Los Alamos Laboratory had been a key figure in the Manhattan Project that created the U.S. atomic bomb, and Bush, an electrical engineer who as director of the Office of Scientific Research and Development had played a pivotal role in persuading the United States government to initiate said project. Both had been members of the group behind the Acheson–Lilienthal Report of 1946, an early proposal for international control of atomic weapons. Oppenheimer had chaired the General Advisory Committee to the AEC, which had issued a report opposing development of the hydrogen bomb, while Bush had remained always influential in nuclear policy discussions. Dickey and Johnson were both former State Department officials, and both had become believers in efforts towards international cooperation. Oppenheimer was selected as chair of the panel, and its executive secretary was McGeorge Bundy, at the time an associate professor of government at Harvard University.

An article in the Bulletin of the Atomic Scientists said that the creation of the panel was "encouraging news, indicating at least some realization of the urgency of the general disarmament problem," but added that it was hoped the panel could focus on the nuclear weapons aspect of the problem.

== Report on timing of a thermonuclear test ==
At the panel's second meeting, in May 1952, the members agreed to form a proposal that the first test of a thermonuclear weapon be postponed. That test, known as Ivy Mike, had been scheduled well in advance, and was set to take place on November 1, 1952, on Enewetak Atoll in the Pacific (October 31, Washington time). This would be just a few days before the November 4 holding of the United States presidential election, 1952, was to take place, in which Truman was not running for re-election.

Bush brought the test postponement idea to Acheson verbally, saying it was improper to, just before an election, conduct a test which would leave an incoming administration in a more dangerous world that they had had no say in bringing about. Bush also argued that conducting a test would forestall the best chance of preventing that more dangerous world; instead, he and the panel favored the idea of a mutual test ban, on the grounds that it could be verified without intrusive inspections, as both nations had the ability to detect violations through atmospheric testing and other unilateral means.

Meanwhile, with Bush and Oppenheimer as the leaders of the effort, the panel worked on a written report which would further explain its thinking. The panel argued that a successful U.S. test would only encourage the Soviets to intensify their efforts towards an H-bomb, both out of an urgent need to match the American achievement and because a successful test would prove that a thermonuclear device was technically possible. In propaganda terms, conducting a test would be to the disadvantage of the United States, since it would appear to be the country marching towards nuclear war. Militarily, the advent of hydrogen bombs on both sides could prove to be an overall negative for the United States, since the United States and its Western European allies had more targets within their territory that were suitable for attack by the hydrogen bomb than the Soviet Union and its Eastern European allies did, and the Soviets could more effectively use their smaller amount of fissionable materials in H-bombs than they could in A-bombs. Most importantly, a conducted H-bomb test would represent a point of no return; whereas a test ban or delay would give everyone a chance to step back and think about whether they really wanted the world to go where it was headed (and since the United States had a big enough lead in A-bombs, it could afford to take that chance).

The main argument against the panel's proposal was made to Acheson by Paul Nitze, the Director of Policy Planning in the State Department and a lead architect of the NSC 68 blueprint for the Cold War. Nitze's logic was that if a test ban was to the advantage of the United States, the Soviets would use the ban to make up time in their weapons development work and then violate it by testing themselves. Nitze further argued that the ability to do effective unilateral monitoring of a test ban might not always exist, and that if an inspection regime became necessary, the Soviets would never accept it. Finally Nitze thought that American development of the H-bomb ahead of the Soviets, combined with the existing American lead in A-bombs, might intimidate the Soviets into accepting a disarmament agreement.

Another reason the panel gave for not conducting a U.S. test of a thermonuclear weapon was that such a test would produce radioactive debris, the capture and analysis of which would give Soviet scientists clues about the nature of the U.S. design and thus help them in their own efforts to develop a weapon. Scholars have disagreed on whether in fact the Soviets did gain any useful information from the Ivy Mike test when it occurred, but on balance it seems that Soviet detection and analysis equipment was insufficient to the task.

The panel had little chance of any of their pleas succeeding in Washington, where they were almost completely lacking in political allies: some of those who had opposed the H-bomb in 1949 had since left positions of influence, while many others had changed their views and now supported it. The panel's formal report, "The Timing of the Thermonuclear Test", was submitted around early September 1952. It gained few adherents, and at a meeting of the National Security Council in October 1952, the panel's suggestions were quickly dismissed by Acheson and Secretary of Defense Robert A. Lovett – with Lovett even suggesting that papers on the proposal should be destroyed. President Truman never saw the panel's request for a test ban or delay, but if he had, there is little doubt he too would have rejected it.

There was a separate desire voiced for a very short delay, perhaps of two weeks, in the test, for reasons related to the test date being just before the presidential election date. Truman wanted to keep the thermonuclear test away from partisan politics but had no desire to order a postponement of it himself; however he did make it known that he would be fine if it was delayed past the election due to "technical reasons" being found. AEC commissioner Eugene M. Zuckert was sent to Enewetak to see if such a reason could be found, but weather considerations indicated it should go ahead as planned; and so Ivy Mike did, on the date intended. A few days later, in a secret meeting at Augusta National Golf Club, President-elect Dwight D. Eisenhower was briefed on what had taken place; the report forwarded to him from the AEC stated in simple fashion that "The island ... which was used for the [test] ... is missing".

== Report on armaments and U.S. foreign policy ==
On around January 9, 1953, the panel submitted to Acheson the main focus of its work, a final report titled "Armaments and American Policy".

The report painted a bleak future in which both the United States and Soviet Union would expand their nuclear stockpiles to the point at which each side would have thousands of weapons and neither side could establish an effective superiority but both sides could effect terrible damage on the other. In particular, the current American nuclear superiority would soon disappear, because the Soviets would have "enough" bombs to cause horrible damage to American civilization, regardless of how many more such bombs the United States might possess and how badly it could destroy the Soviets. This concept of "enoughness" was something that Dulles in particular was concerned that the American public be informed about.

The panel stated that "a world of this kind may enjoy a strange stability arising from general understanding that it would be suicidal to 'throw the switch' [but] a world so dangerous may not be very calm, [because] it will be necessary for statesmen to decide against rash action not just once, but every time." At root, the report felt, the fundamental problem raised by nuclear weapons was the need to avoid war, something humanity had never shown an ability to do. Nor was the report optimistic about the possibility of arms limitations agreements being reached between the two nations, given the vast differences between their politico-economic systems and the level of unbending deceitfulness with which the Soviet Union operated. The report was largely drafted by Oppenheimer and Bundy, but panel members Dickey and Johnson were especially influential in ensuring that the report conveyed these stark conclusions.

In the report, the panel did make five overall recommendations:

- Reduction of nuclear secrecy and greater candor towards the American public
- Improved communication with U.S. allies regarding nuclear matters
- Attention to defense of the American continent against Soviet air attack
- Disengagement from the slogan-dominated UN nuclear disarmament discussions
- Improved communications with the Soviet Union.

Oppenheimer discussed and disseminated some of the report's conclusions during February 1953, first via an off-the-record speech at the Council on Foreign Relations in New York and then by sending copies of that speech to some prominent journalists and analysts. Several months later he published an article in Foreign Affairs magazine based on ideas in the Council speech.

Despite the Panel of Consultants on Disarmament having been formed under a different administration of a different political party, the panel's members had sufficient knowledge, experience, and standing so as to attract attention to their report in the incoming Eisenhower administration. The panel document also benefited by being more directly and succinctly written than the average consultants' report. President Eisenhower became receptive to some of the ideas of the report and asked his National Security Council staff to read it.

The recommendation that Eisenhower responded most favorably to was the one for greater openness on nuclear issues. This directly led to the creation of Operation Candor, which was intended as a public relations campaign to inform the U.S. public of the facts as to the armaments race – including the realities of Soviet nuclear capabilities and the dangers they posed to America – and thereby get the public out of a state of atomic apathy. The panel's report also triggered a desire by Eisenhower to seek a new and different approach to the threat of nuclear war in international relations, one that would give some measure of hope to the American public despite the realities of "enoughness". This desire was part of what led to Eisenhower's "Atoms for Peace" speech in December 1953.

On the whole, however, Eisenhower did not treat the push for candor as part of an overall plan for disarmament, as the panel's report had intended, but rather as a goal in and of itself. Indeed, the Eisenhower administration's "New Look" defense posture emphasized a greater dependence on strategic nuclear weapons, as part of concern for balancing Cold War military commitments with the nation's financial resources.

== Legacy ==
While the panel's existence was known to highly informed members of the public, its full report was not made public at the time. Attention to the panel by historians has been intermittent.

Soviet development of the hydrogen bomb proceeded on its own, determined course, which culminated in August 1953 with a partial thermonuclear test and then in November 1955 with a successful aircraft drop of a true thermonuclear weapon. The Soviet accomplishments were based on its own scientific work and did not gain information from the U.S. program; nor was it likely that the Soviets would have responded positively to any proposal to ban tests of the new weapon.

The panel's conclusions regarding the strategic nuclear balance and its concomitant dangers were prescient. As McGeorge Bundy wrote decades later, "In the world of the 1980s, when we have lived with thermonuclear stalemate for a generation, [the panel's] analysis is familiar. At the time it was both startling and chilling."

Oppenheimer's stances in the panel, first in unsuccessfully urging a postponement of the initial test and then in somewhat successfully advocating for general openness toward the public on nuclear matters, ended up being to his detriment. Those in the U.S. government who had long held suspicions about Oppenheimer's judgment and loyalties used these stances as additional fuel, and by the end of 1953 the wheels were in motion that would lead to the Oppenheimer security hearings the following year and the resultant loss of Oppenheimer's security clearance. Those actions against Oppenheimer were part of even greater effort, led by AEC commissioner Lewis Strauss, to rewrite post-World War II American nuclear history to find supposed villains who had delayed and obstructed the U.S. development of the hydrogen bomb.
