= Webster v. Doe =

- Supreme Court of the United States

Argued January 12, 1988 Decided June 15, 1988
- Full case name: William Hedgcock Webster, Director of Central Intelligence v. John Doe
- Citations: 486 U.S. 592 (more) 108 S. Ct. 2047; 100 L. Ed. 2d 632; 1988 U.S. LEXIS 2724; 56 U.S.L.W. 4568; 46 Fair Empl. Prac. Cas. (BNA) 1671; 46 Empl. Prac. Dec. (CCH) ¶ 38,034; 3 I.E.R. Cas. (BNA) 545

Case history
- Prior: Doe v. Casey, 601 F. Supp. 581 (D.D.C. 1985); reversed, 796 F.2d 1508 (D.C. Cir. 1986); cert. granted, 482 U.S. 913 (1987).

Holding
- The Court held that Section 102(c) of the National Security Act, 50 U.S.C. 402(c), precluded review under the APA. However, the Court also held that the Act did not preclude review of constitutional claims (as opposed to the procedural claims).

Court membership
- Chief Justice William Rehnquist Associate Justices William J. Brennan Jr. · Byron White; Thurgood Marshall · Harry Blackmun; John P. Stevens · Sandra Day O'Connor; Antonin Scalia · Anthony Kennedy

Case opinions
- Majority: Rehnquist, joined by Brennan, White, Marshall, Blackmun, Stevens; O'Connor (parts I, II)
- Concur/dissent: O'Connor
- Dissent: Scalia
- Kennedy took no part in the consideration or decision of the case.

Laws applied
- National Security Act of 1947

Webster v. Doe, 486 U.S. 592 (1988), is a case decided by the United States Supreme Court that presented statutory and constitutional claims by a former CIA employee who alleged that his termination was the result of discrimination based on sexual orientation.

== Background ==
The National Security Act of 1947 authorizes the Director of the CIA "in his discretion" to terminate the employment of any employee whenever he shall deem it to be in the security interests of the United States. John Doe, a CIA employee, voluntarily admitted to a CIA security guard that he was a homosexual. Despite having previously received ratings of "excellent" and "outstanding" employee performance, the employee was placed on administrative leave and later terminated as the result of his admission. William J. Casey, the Director of the CIA at that time, cited Doe's homosexuality as a threat to security. (Note that even though William H. Webster is named as the petitioner, Casey was the Director at the time of Doe's termination.)

== Opinion of the Court ==
The issue presented before the Supreme Court was whether, and to what extent, the termination decisions of the Director under 102(c) are judicially reviewable. The Court, in an opinion delivered by Chief Justice Rehnquist, held that Section 102(c) of the National Security Act, 50 U.S.C. 403(c), precluded review under the Administrative Procedure Act. However, the Court held that the Act did not preclude review of constitutional claims (as opposed to the procedural claims). The Court reasoned that Congress should not be taken to have intended to preclude constitutional claims unless it has explicitly so provided (603).

=== Dissent ===
Justice Scalia was the only justice to completely dissent; Justice O'Connor concurred in part and dissented in part while Justice Kennedy took no part in the consideration or decision of the case. Justice Scalia wrote in his dissent, "Neither the Constitution, nor our laws, nor common sense gives an individual a right to come into court to litigate the reasons for his dismissal as an intelligence agent" (620).

== See also ==
- Don't ask, don't tell
- List of LGBTQ-related cases in the United States Supreme Court
- List of United States Supreme Court cases, volume 486
- List of United States Supreme Court cases
- Lists of United States Supreme Court cases by volume
- List of United States Supreme Court cases by the Rehnquist Court
