= Atomic Weapons Rewards Act of 1955 =

United States federal statute

- Long title: An Act to provide rewards for information concerning the illegal introduction into the United States or the illegal manufacture or acquisition in the United States, of special nuclear material and atomic weapons.
- Acronyms (colloquial): AWRA
- Nicknames: Atomic Weapons and Special Nuclear Materials Rewards Act
- Enacted by: the 84th United States Congress
- Effective: July 15, 1955

Citations
- Public law: 84-165
- Statutes at Large: 69 Stat. 365

Codification
- Titles amended: 50 U.S.C.: War and National Defense
- U.S.C. sections created: 50 U.S.C. ch. 4C § 47a et seq.

Legislative history
- Introduced in the Senate as S. 609 by Clinton Presba Anderson (D–NM) on June 22, 1955; Committee consideration by Joint Committee on Atomic Energy; Passed the Senate on June 28, 1955 (Passed); Passed the House on July 5, 1955 (Passed, in lieu of H.R. 6901) with amendment; Senate agreed to House amendment on July 7, 1955 (Agreed); Signed into law by President Dwight D. Eisenhower on July 15, 1955

Atomic Weapons Rewards Act of 1955 authorized financial transactions for information pertaining to the unlawful acquisition, importation, or manufacture of special nuclear material into the United States. The United States federal statute specifies financial reward payments of fifty thousand dollars be approved by the United States President with an inclusion not to exceed five hundred thousand dollars. The Act of Congress established an Awards Board embodying Federal Directorates from Secretary of the Treasury, Secretary of Defense, Attorney General, Central Intelligence, and Atomic Energy Commission.

Senate bill 609 legislation was passed by the 84th United States Congressional session and enacted into law by the 34th President of the United States Dwight Eisenhower on July 15, 1955.

== Sections of the Act ==
Atomic Weapons Rewards Act was authored as seven sections defining the United States codified law formulation for appropriating United States currency for fissile material information.

50 U.S.C. § 47a ~	Short Title; Cited as "Atomic Weapons Rewards Act of 1955"
50 U.S.C. § 47a ~	Illegal Acquisition, Importation, or Manufacture of Special Nuclear Material; Basis of Provided Information; Reward Amount Restriction
50 U.S.C. § 47b ~	Awards Board Establishment; Reward Determination by Board; Reward Financial Amount; United States President Approval
50 U.S.C. § 47c ~	Aliens and Foreign Nationals; Immigrant Visas Authorization; Permanent Residence Admission
50 U.S.C. § 47d ~	Awards Board Hearings; Amend Rules and Regulations
50 U.S.C. § 47e ~	Certification of Award; Approval by Awards Board; Approval by President of the United States
50 U.S.C. § 47f ~	Definitions; Atomic Energy; Atomic Weapon; Special Nuclear Material; United States

== Atomic Weapons Rewards Act Amendment of 1974 ==
The 93rd United States Congressional session amended the 1955 Act with the passage of Senate bill 3669. The legislation was enacted into law by the 38th President of the United States Gerald Ford on August 17, 1974.

== See also ==
1958 US–UK Mutual Defence Agreement	Glienicke Bridge
Atomic Age	History of nuclear weapons
Atomic Energy Act of 1954	Intermediate-Range Nuclear Forces Treaty
Atomic spies	Nuclear Non-Proliferation Act of 1978
Atomium	Nuclear terrorism
Atoms for Peace	Project Y
Bulletin of the Atomic Scientists	Soviet Scientists Immigration Act of 1992
Emergency Committee of Atomic Scientists	Trinity Atmospheric Test
FBI Silvermaster File	United States Strategic Bombing Survey

== Bibliography ==
- Watts, Richard (December 2, 1942). "Manhattan Project Notebook (1942)". NARA Milestone Documents. U.S. National Archives and Records Administration.
- Truman, Harry S. (August 6, 1945). "Statement by the President Announcing the Use of the A-Bomb at Hiroshima - August 6, 1945". Internet Archive. Washington, D.C.: National Archives and Records Service. pp. 197–200.
- Truman, Harry S. (January 31, 1950). "Statement by the President on the Hydrogen Bomb - January 31, 1950". Internet Archive. Washington, D.C.: National Archives and Records Service. p. 138.

== Periodical Resources ==
- "BILL URGES CASH FOR ATOMIC TIPS; Rewards Up to Half a Million Asked by Brownell for Data on Traffic in Weapons". The New York Times. July 31, 1954.
- "Rewards Up to $500,000 Are Proposed For Informers on Atom Smuggling Here". The New York Times. January 19, 1955.
- "HOUSE ACTS TO BAR ATOM SMUGGLERS; Rewards of Up to $500,000 Approved for Information Leading to Capture". The New York Times. July 6, 1955.
- "Atom Reward Bill Signed". The New York Times. July 16, 1955.
- "$500,000 REWARD CITED; Post Offices Display Text of Law on Atom Arms Entry". The New York Times. May 25, 1957.

== Historical Video Archives ==
- "You Can Beat The Atomic Bomb 26092". Internet Archive. Periscope Film. 1950.
- "Atomic Alert". Internet Archive. Encyclopaedia Britannica Films. 1951.
- "Duck and Cover". Internet Archive. U.S. Federal Civil Defense Administration. 1951.
- "The Atomic Bomb: Its Effects and How To Meet Them". Periscope Film. Verity Films Ltd. 1952.
- "A is for Atom". Internet Archive. John Sutherland Productions. 1953.
- "Target: You!". Internet Archive. U.S. Federal Civil Defense Administration. 1953.
- "Let's Face It". Internet Archive. U.S. Federal Civil Defense Administration. 1954.
- "A New Look at the Hydrogen Bomb". Internet Archive. U.S. Federal Civil Defense Administration. 1955.
- "About Fallout". Internet Archive. Wilding Picture Productions, Inc. 1955.
- "Uranium Prospecting". Periscope Film. P.R.I. Productions. 1955.
- "Bombproof 28162". Periscope Film. Burroughs Corporation. 1956.
- "History of the Atom Bomb, Manhattan Project, and Atomic Power 71674z". Periscope Film. The March of Time. 1956.
- "Three Two One Zero ~ 1950s Birth of Atomic Bomb and Atomic Energy". Periscope Film. National Broadcasting Company. 1956.
- "Warning Red". Internet Archive. Norwood Studios. 1956.
- "Stay Safe, Stay Strong: The Facts About Nuclear Weapons". Internet Archive. Cinefonics, Inc. 1960.
- "About Fallout". Internet Archive. U.S. Office of Civil Defense. 1963.
- "Shelter on a Quiet Street XD13814" [1963 Civil Defense Film Construction of Home Fallout Shelter]. Periscope Film. United States Department of Defense. 1963.
