= Arizona v. Roberson =

- Supreme Court of the United States

Argued January 11, 1988 Decided May 23, 1988
- Full case name: State of Arizona v. Jonathan Roberson
- Docket no.: 87-526
- Citations: 486 U.S. 675 (more) 108 S. Ct. 2093; 100 L. Ed. 2d 704

Holding
- Once a suspect in custody requests counsel, police may not initiate further interrogation about any offense, even if unrelated to the original charge.

Court membership
- Chief Justice William Rehnquist Associate Justices William J. Brennan Jr. · Byron White; Thurgood Marshall · Harry Blackmun; John P. Stevens · Sandra Day O'Connor; Antonin Scalia · Anthony Kennedy

Case opinions
- Majority: Stevens, joined by Brennan, Marshall, Blackmun, O'Connor, Scalia
- Dissent: Kennedy, joined by Rehnquist

Laws applied
- U.S. Const. amend. V; Edwards v. Arizona

Arizona v. Roberson, 486 U.S. 675 (1988), is a decision by the United States Supreme Court that clarified and extended the protections provided under Edwards v. Arizona. The Court held that once a suspect in police custody invokes their right to counsel under the Fifth Amendment, law enforcement may not initiate further custodial interrogation about any offense—related or unrelated—unless the suspect initiates the conversation. The ruling reinforced the requirement that all questioning cease until an attorney is present, emphasizing the importance of protecting suspects from coercive police practices after requesting legal representation.

== Background ==
=== History of the Fifth Amendment ===
The Fifth Amendment to the United States Constitution, ratified in 1791 as part of the United States Bill of Rights, provides several protections for individuals in legal proceedings. One of its most well-known clauses states that no person “shall be compelled in any criminal case to be a witness against himself.” This protection against self-incrimination is the foundation for the Miranda warning, which requires law enforcement to inform suspects of their rights before custodial interrogation.

Over time, the Supreme Court has interpreted the Fifth Amendment to ensure that individuals are not coerced into confessing or speaking without legal representation. Landmark cases, such as Miranda v. Arizona and Edwards v. Arizona, strengthened these protections by setting rules for how and when police can question suspects. Arizona v. Roberson continued this line of jurisprudence by further limiting police-initiated interrogations once the right to counsel is invoked.

=== Connection of Edward v. Arizona ===
The Supreme Court's ruling in Arizona v. Roberson built directly on the foundation established in Edwards v. Arizona. While Edwards prohibited police from reinitiating questioning once a suspect requested counsel, Roberson clarified that this protection applies even when officers attempt to question the suspect about a different, unrelated offense. The Court emphasized that allowing such questioning would undermine the purpose of Edwards and risk eroding the suspect's Fifth Amendment rights.

=== History of the case ===
On April 16, 1985, Jonathan Roberson was arrested in Tucson, Arizona, in connection with a burglary. Following his arrest, Roberson was read his Miranda rights and subsequently requested to speak with a lawyer. Under the precedent established in Edwards v. Arizona, law enforcement officers were required to cease questioning once a suspect invoked their right to counsel.

Despite this, three days later—while Roberson remained in custody—a different officer, unaware of Roberson's earlier request, initiated a new interrogation about a separate and unrelated burglary investigation. During that second questioning, Roberson was again advised of his Miranda rights, waived them, and made incriminating statements about the new offense.

Roberson's legal counsel later moved to suppress those statements, arguing that the second interrogation violated the Edwards rule. The trial court denied the motion, and the Arizona Court of Appeals affirmed. However, the Arizona Supreme Court reversed that decision, holding that Roberson's rights under Edwards had been violated. The State of Arizona then appealed to the U.S. Supreme Court.

== Argument ==
The State of Arizona argued that the second interrogation was lawful because it concerned a different offense and Roberson had been re-advised of his Miranda rights. They contended that Edwards should not apply when the questioning is unrelated to the original offense for which the right to counsel was invoked.

Roberson's defense argued that once a suspect requests counsel, any police-initiated custodial interrogation—regardless of the subject matter—violates the suspect's Fifth Amendment rights unless the suspect initiates further discussion. The defense relied on the language and reasoning in Edwards v. Arizona.

== Lower courts ==
The trial court admitted Roberson's confession, ruling the second interrogation did not violate his rights. The Arizona Court of Appeals affirmed. However, the Arizona Supreme Court reversed, holding that the confession should have been suppressed under Edwards, because Roberson had previously invoked his right to counsel and had not initiated the later conversation.

== Supreme Court decision ==
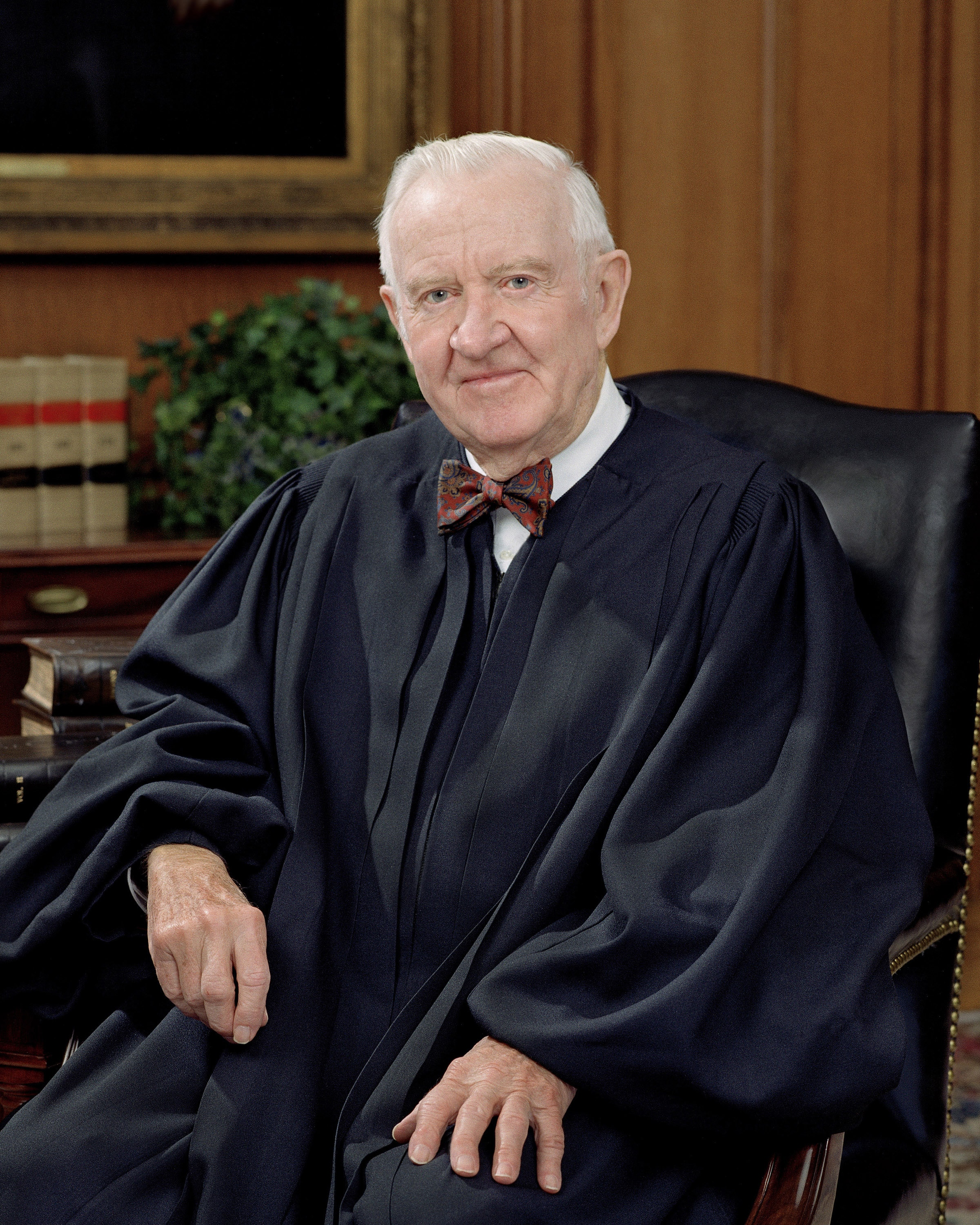
Justice John Paul Stevens delivered the majority opinion in Arizona v. Roberson (1988).

=== Opinion of the Court ===
In a 6–2 decision, the United States Supreme Court affirmed the Arizona Supreme Court's ruling. The majority held that the protections established in Edwards v. Arizona apply even when law enforcement attempts to interrogate a suspect about a different crime than the one that initially led the suspect to request legal counsel. Writing for the Court, Justice John Paul Stevens emphasized that once a suspect invokes their right to counsel, any police-initiated custodial interrogation must cease until an attorney is present, regardless of whether the new questioning concerns a separate investigation.

The Court reasoned that allowing further interrogations about unrelated offenses would undermine the clarity and protective purpose of the Edwards rule. The majority concluded that re-administering Miranda warnings alone is not sufficient once the right to counsel has been invoked.

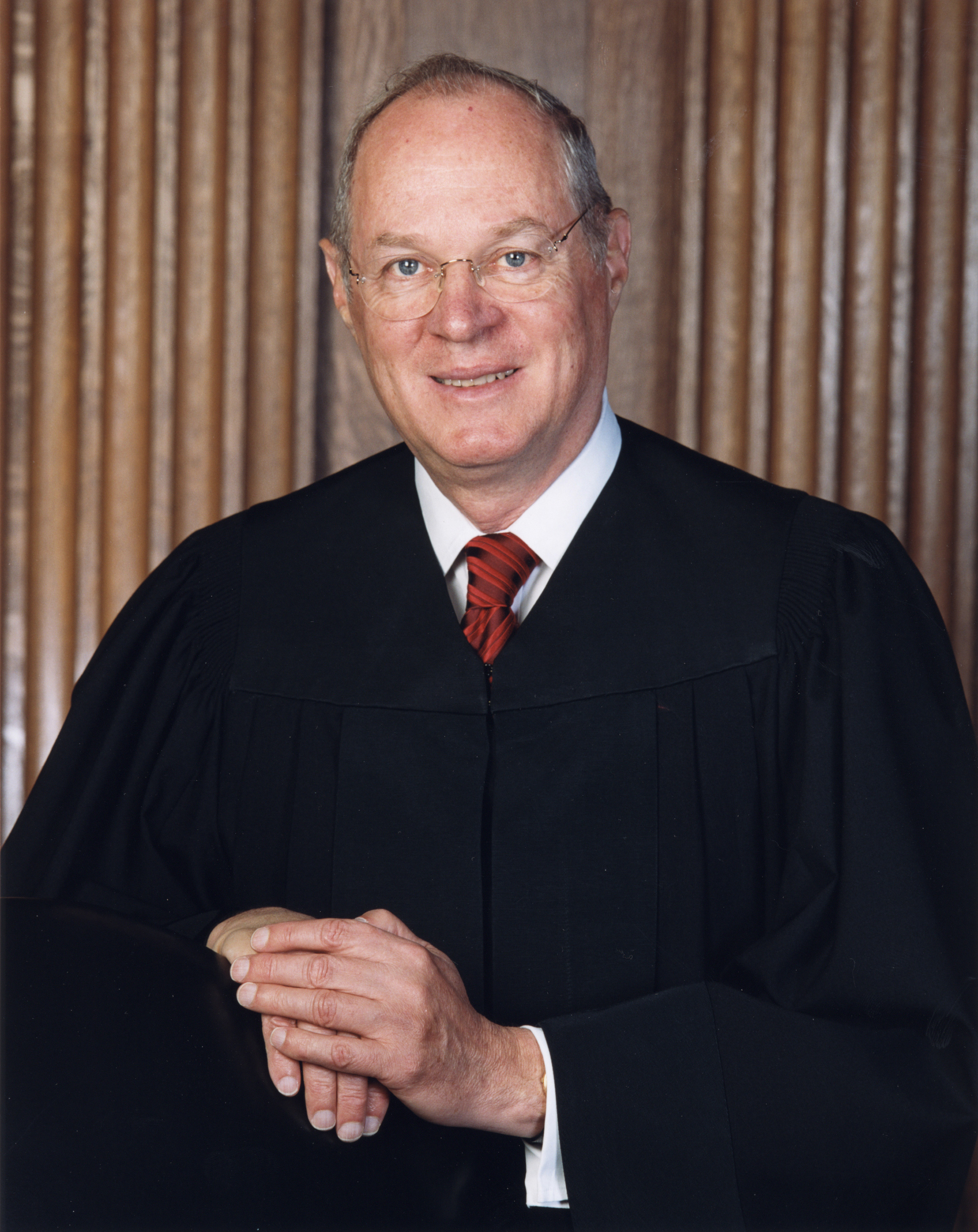
Justice Anthony Kennedy authored the dissenting opinion in Arizona v. Roberson (1988).

=== Dissent ===
Justice Anthony Kennedy, joined by Chief Justice William Rehnquist, dissented from the majority opinion. The dissent argued that the Court's extension of Edwards v. Arizona was unnecessary and overly rigid. Justice Kennedy contended that once a suspect is given fresh Miranda warnings and voluntarily waives those rights, any statements made in a subsequent interrogation—even about a different crime—should be considered admissible.

He expressed concern that the majority's decision would hamper legitimate police investigations by imposing an absolute rule that was not grounded in the practical realities of custodial interrogation. The dissent favored a more flexible approach that allowed officers to question a suspect about unrelated offenses, provided that proper Miranda procedures were followed.

== Significance ==
Arizona v. Roberson extended the application of Edwards v. Arizona by clarifying that once a suspect requests counsel, law enforcement may not initiate any custodial interrogation—even about unrelated crimes—unless the suspect initiates further conversation. This decision strengthened protections for individuals in police custody and reinforced the procedural safeguards required under Miranda and the Fifth Amendment.
