= Gammator =

A Gammator was a gamma irradiator made by the Radiation Machinery Corporation during the U.S. Atoms for Peace project of the 1950s and 1960s. The gammator was distributed by the "Atomic Energy Commission to schools, hospitals, and private firms to promote nuclear understanding." Around 120-140 Gammators were distributed throughout the U.S. and the whereabouts of several of them are unknown, although the Department of Energy has removed and destroyed many of the units.

== Specifications ==
A Gammator weighed about 1,850 pounds and contained about 400 curies of caesium-137 in a pellet roughly the size of a pen.

== Concerns ==
Because of the massive shielding of a Gammator, the machine is very safe when used as intended (e.g. school science experiments); according to the Los Alamos National Laboratory, it is similar to machines used to irradiate blood. However, this amount of nuclear material could pose a significant problem if used as the radioactive component in a dirty bomb.
