= Atoms for Peace =

1953 speech by US President Eisenhower

- Part of the Cold War
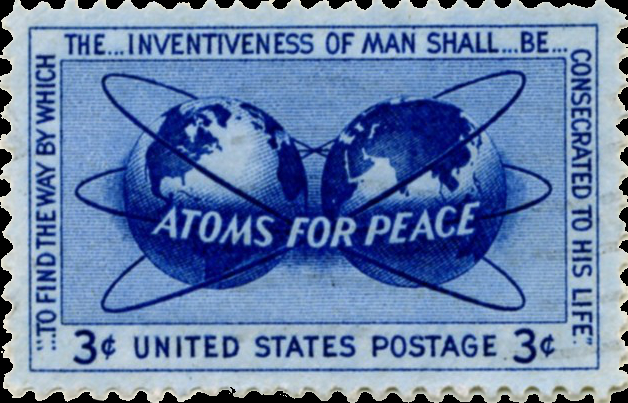
- American commemorative stamp of 1955 in allusion to the program Atoms for Peace
- Date: December 8, 1953; 72 years ago
- Location: New York City
- Theme: Arms control
- Participants: Dwight Eisenhower
- Website: www.eisenhowerlibrary.gov/research/online-documents/atoms-peace

"Atoms for Peace" was the title of a speech delivered by U.S. president Dwight D. Eisenhower to the UN General Assembly in New York City on December 8, 1953.

I feel impelled to speak today in a language that in a sense is new—one which I, who have spent so much of my life in the military profession, would have preferred never to use. That new language is the language of atomic warfare.

The United States then launched an "Atoms for Peace" program that supplied equipment and information to schools, hospitals, and research institutions within the U.S. and throughout the world. The first nuclear reactors in Israel and Pakistan were built under the program by American Machine and Foundry, a company more commonly known as a major manufacturer of bowling equipment.

== Philosophy ==
The speech was part of a carefully orchestrated media campaign, called "Operation Candor", to enlighten the American public on the risks and hopes of a nuclear future. It was designed to shift public focus away from the military, a strategy that Eisenhower referred to as "psychological warfare." Both Operation Candor and Atoms for Peace were influenced by the January 1953 report of the State Department Panel of Consultants on Disarmament, which urged that the United States government practice less secrecy and more honesty toward the American people about the realities of the nuclear balance and the dangers of nuclear warfare, which triggered in Eisenhower a desire to seek a new and different approach to the threat of nuclear war in international relations.

"Atoms for Peace" was a propaganda component of the Cold War strategy of containment. Eisenhower's speech opened a media campaign that would last for years and that aimed at "emotion management", balancing fears of continuing nuclear armament with promises of peaceful use of uranium in future nuclear reactors. The speech was a tipping point for international focus on peaceful uses of atomic energy, even during the early stages of the Cold War. Eisenhower, with some influence from J. Robert Oppenheimer, may have been attempting to convey a spirit of comfort to a terrified world after the horror of Hiroshima and Nagasaki and of the nuclear tests of the early 1950s.

It presented an ostensible antithesis to brinkmanship, the international intrigue that subsequently kept the world at the edge of war.

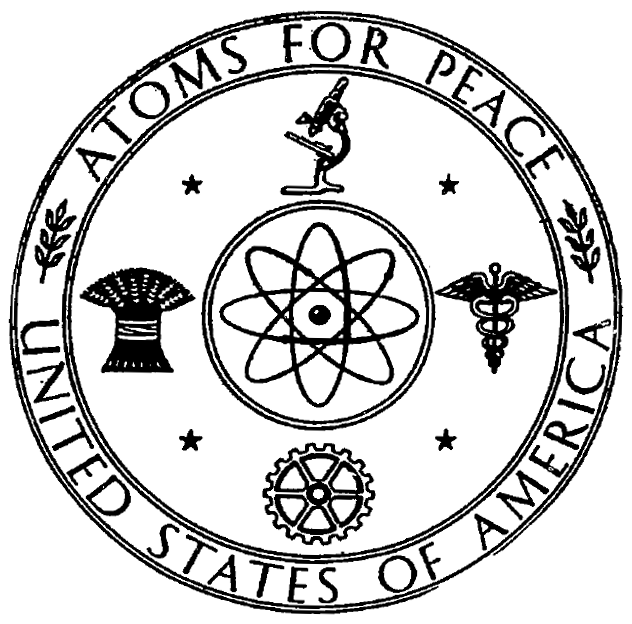
The Atoms for Peace symbol mounted over the door to the American swimming pool reactor building during the 1955 International Conference on the Peaceful Uses of Atomic Energy in Geneva, often called the Atoms for Peace conference

Eisenhower's invoking of "those same great concepts of universal peace and human dignity which are so clearly etched in" the UN Charter placed new emphasis upon the U.S. responsibility for its nuclear actions—past, present, and future. This address laid down the rules of engagement for the new kind of warfare: the Cold War.

Two quotations from the speech follow:

It is with the book of history, and not with isolated pages, that the United States will ever wish to be identified. My country wants to be constructive, not destructive. It wants agreement, not wars, among nations. It wants itself to live in freedom, and in the confidence that the people of every other nation enjoy equally the right of choosing their own way of life.

— Dwight D. Eisenhower

To the making of these fateful decisions, the United States pledges before you—and therefore before the world its determination to help solve the fearful atomic dilemma—to devote its entire heart and mind to find the way by which the miraculous inventiveness of man shall not be dedicated to his death, but consecrated to his life.

— Dwight D. Eisenhower

=== Effects of the speech ===
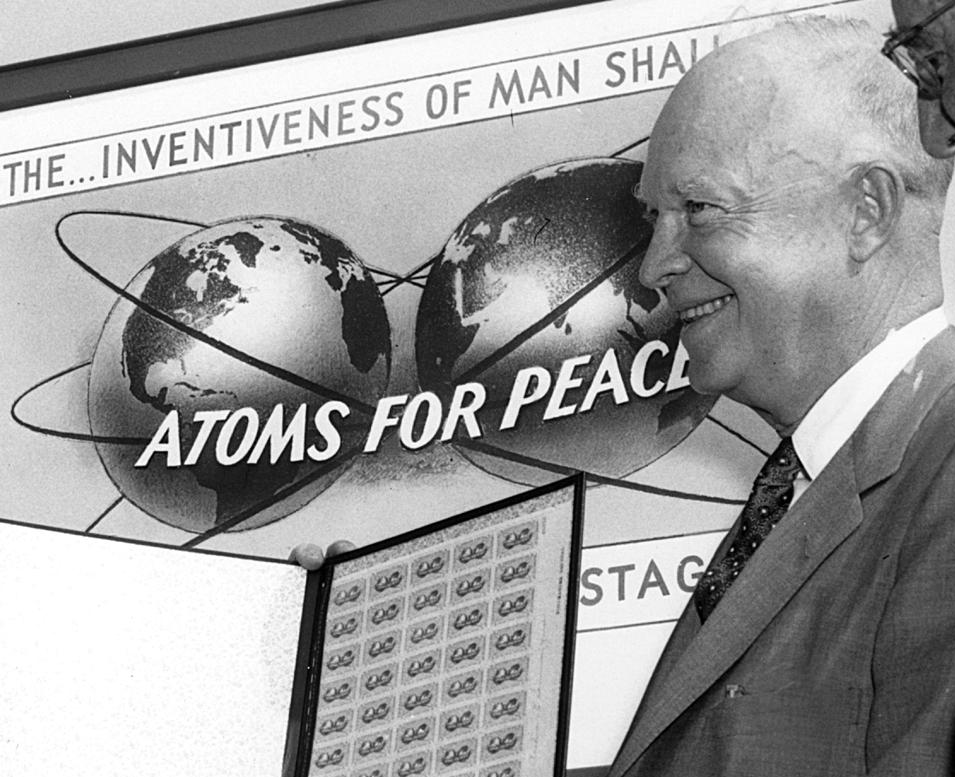
"Atoms for Peace" 3 cent U.S. stamp presentation with President Eisenhower in 1955

Prior to Eisenhower's speech, the state of atomic development in the world was under strict secrecy. The information and expertise needed for atomic development was bound by the secret Quebec Agreement of 1943 and thus not devoted to peaceful processes, but instead as a weapon to defend against other countries which were developing and using the same weaponry.

Eisenhower's speech brought the atomic issue which had been kept quiet for "national security" into the public eye, asking the world to support his solution. Eisenhower was determined to solve "the fearful atomic dilemma" by finding some way by which "the miraculous inventiveness of man would not be dedicated to his death, but consecrated to his life." However, Eisenhower was not completely effective in his repurposing; Eisenhower himself approved the National Security Council (NSC) document which stated that only a massive atomic weapon base would deter violence from the Soviet Union. The belief that to avoid a nuclear war, the United States must stay on the offensive, ready to strike at any time, is the same reason that the Soviet Union would not give up its atomic weapons either. During Eisenhower's time in office the nuclear holdings of the US rose from 1,005 to 20,000 weapons.

The Atoms for Peace program opened up nuclear research to civilians and countries that had not previously possessed nuclear technology (South Africa, Iran, Israel, Pakistan, India, Argentina, and Brazil). Eisenhower argued for a nonproliferation agreement throughout the world and argued for a stop of the spread of military use of nuclear weapons. Although the nations that already had atomic weapons kept their weapons and grew their supplies, very few other countries have developed similar weapons—in this sense, it has been very much contained. The Atoms for Peace program also created regulations for the use of nuclear power and through these regulations stopped other countries from developing weapons while allowing the technology to be used for positive means.

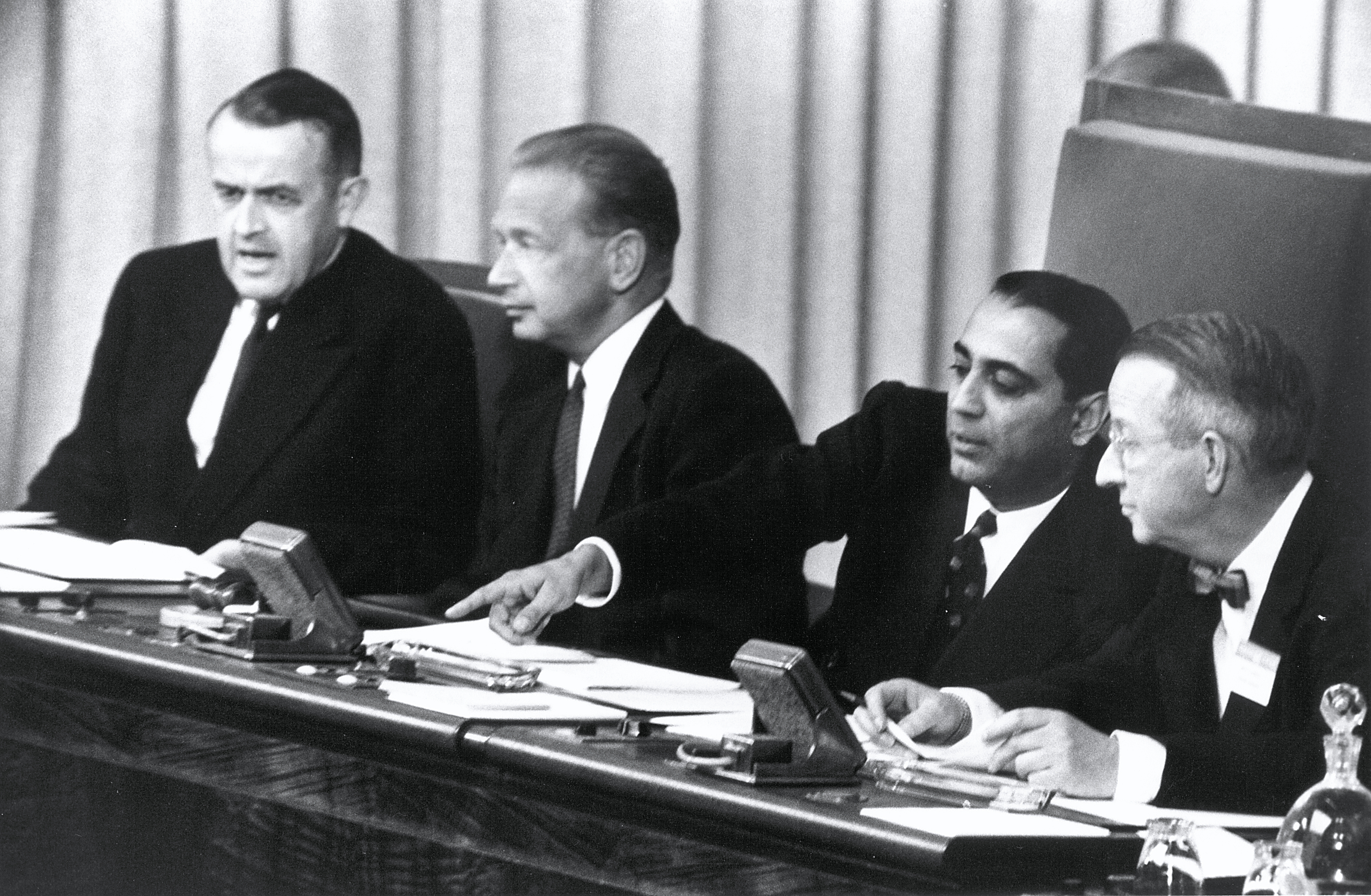
At the rostrum of the Palais des Nations' Assembly hall for the opening of the International Conference on Peaceful Uses of Atomic Energy. (Left to right) Max Petitpierre, President of the Swiss Confederation, U.N. Secretary General Dag Hammarskjold, Homi J. Bhabha of India, President of the Conference, and Walter G. Whitman from the United States, Conference Secretary General

== Legacy ==
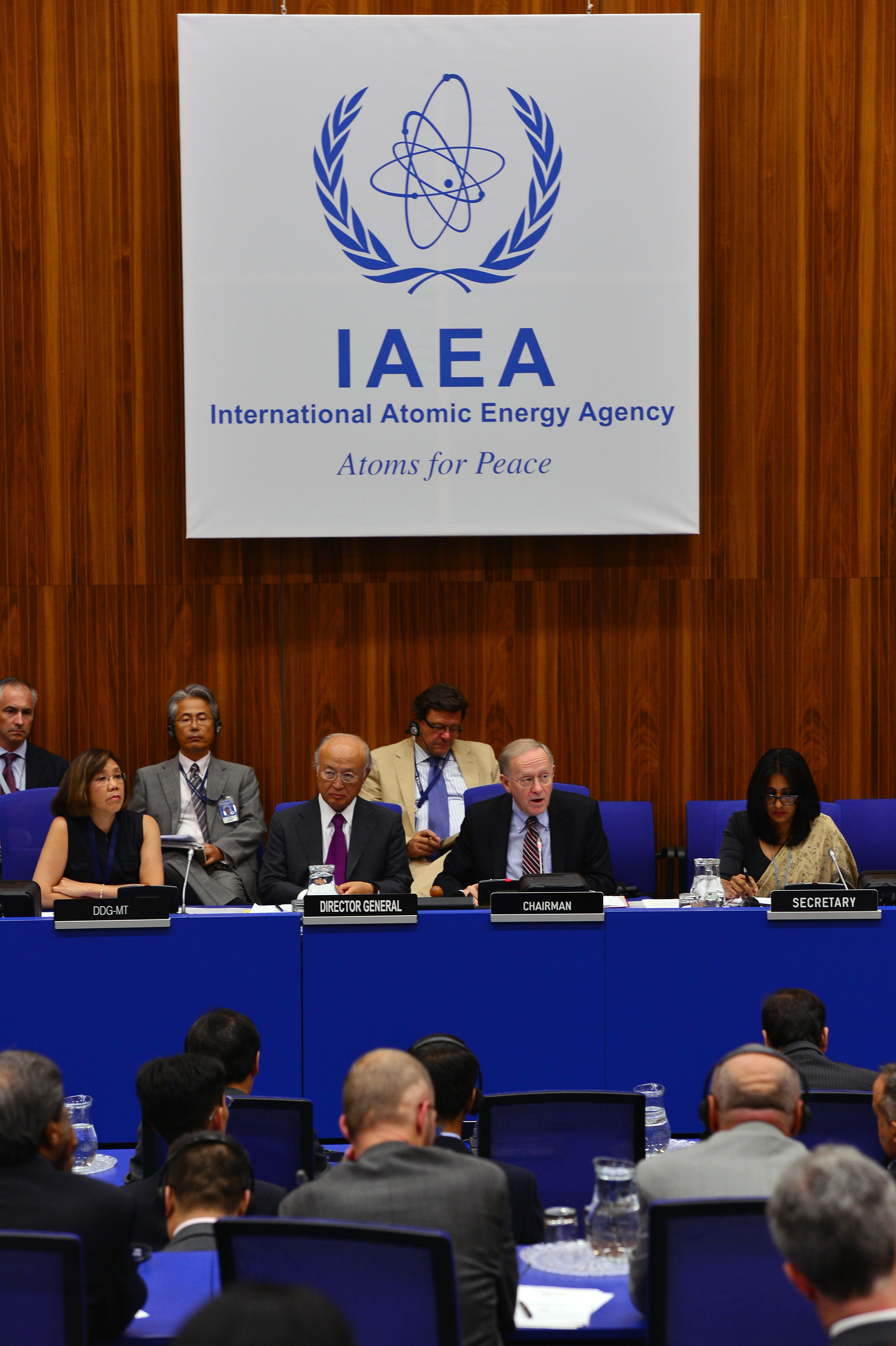
The "Atoms for Peace" slogan still in use above the panel at a 2013 IAEA meeting

Atoms for Peace created the ideological background for the creation of the International Atomic Energy Agency and the Treaty on the Non-Proliferation of Nuclear Weapons, but also gave political cover for the U.S. nuclear weapons build-up, and the backdrop to the Cold War arms race. Under Atoms for Peace related programs the U.S. exported over 25 tons of highly enriched uranium (HEU) to 30 countries, mostly to fuel research reactors, which is now regarded as a proliferation and terrorism risk. Under a similar program, the Soviet Union exported over 11 tons of HEU.

Research by Matthew Fuhrmann has linked civilian nuclear cooperation to nuclear weapons programs, as the technology, know-how and materials used and generated by civilian nuclear use reduced the costs of pursuing a nuclear weapons program.

== See also ==
- Atomic gardening
- Atoms for Peace Award
- Atoms for Peace Galaxy
- Baruch Plan
- Gammator
- NS Savannah
- NS Otto Hahn
- Nuclear fuel bank
- Nuclear program of Iran
- Nuclear power plant
- Operation Plowshare
- Our Friend the Atom
- Pro-nuclear movement
- Science diplomacy
- Shippingport Reactor
- Swords into ploughshares
- World Nuclear Association
- World Nuclear University

== Sources ==
- Chernus, Ira (2002). Eisenhower's Atoms for Peace. Texas A&M University Press. ISBN 978-1-58544-220-1.
- Cooke, Stephanie (2009). In Mortal Hands: A Cautionary History of the Nuclear Age. Bloomsbury. ISBN 978-1-59691-617-3.
- Fuhrmann, Matthew (2012). Atomic Assistance: How 'Atoms for Peace' Programs Cause Nuclear Insecurity. Cornell University Press. ISBN 978-0-8014-5090-7. JSTOR 10.7591/j.cttn34vg.
- Pilat, Joseph F.; Pendley, Robert E.; Ebinger, Charles K., eds. (2019). Atoms For Peace: An Analysis After Thirty Years. doi:10.4324/9780429038327. ISBN 978-0-429-03832-7. OCLC 1090001300.
