= List of United States Supreme Court cases, volume 486 =

This is a list of all United States Supreme Court cases from volume 486 of the United States Reports:

| Case name | Citation | Date decided |
|---|---|---|
| Dept. of Justice v Julian J | 486 U.S. 1 | 1988 |
| D.H. Holmes Co. Ltd. v. McNamara | 486 U.S. 24 | 1988 |
| California v. Greenwood | 486 U.S. 35 | 1988 |
| City of New York v. FCC | 486 U.S. 57 | 1988 |
| Bankers Life & Casualty Co. v. M. Crenshaw | 486 U.S. 71 | 1988 |
| Patrick v. M. Burget | 486 U.S. 94 | 1988 |
| EEOC v. Com. Office Products Co. | 486 U.S. 107 | 1988 |
| McLaughlin v. Richland Shoe Co. | 486 U.S. 128 | 1988 |
| Chick Kam Choo v. Exxon Corp. | 486 U.S. 140 | 1988 |
| Wheat v. United States | 486 U.S. 153 | 1988 |
| Goodyear Atomic Corp. v. Miller | 486 U.S. 174 | 1988 |
| Budinich v. Becton Dickinson & Co. | 486 U.S. 196 | 1988 |
| Fed. Energy Regulatory Comm'n v. Martin Exploration Management Co. | 486 U.S. 204 | 1988 |
| Amadeo v. Zant | 486 U.S. 214 | 1988 |
| FDIC v. E Mallen | 486 U.S. 230 | 1988 |
| Satterwhite v. Texas | 486 U.S. 249 | 1988 |
| New Energy Co. v. Limbach | 486 U.S. 269 | 1988 |
| Mart Corp. v. Cartier Inc. 47th Street Photo Inc. | 486 U.S. 281 | 1988 |
| Monessen Sw. Ry. Co. v. L Morgan | 486 U.S. 330 | 1988 |
| Maynard v. T. Cartwright | 486 U.S. 356 | 1988 |
| Mills v. Maryland | 486 U.S. 367 | 1988 |
| Lingle v. Norge Division of Magic Chef Inc. | 486 U.S. 399 | 1988 |
| Meyer v. K. Grant | 486 U.S. 414 | 1988 |
| McCoy v. Ct. App. | 486 U.S. 429 | 1988 |
| Clark v. Jeter | 486 U.S. 456 | 1988 |
| Shapero v. Ky. Bar Ass'n | 486 U.S. 466 | 1988 |
| Allied Tube Conduit Corp. v. Indian Head Inc. | 486 U.S. 492 | 1988 |
| van Cauwenberghe v. Biard | 486 U.S. 517 | 1988 |
| Berkovitz v. United States | 486 U.S. 531 | 1988 |
| Loeffler v. M. Frank | 486 U.S. 549 | 1988 |
| Michigan v. Chesternut | 486 U.S. 567 | 1988 |
| Johnson v. Mississippi | 486 U.S. 578 | 1988 |
| Webster v. Doe | 486 U.S. 592 | 1988 |
| "B.J." Pinter v. Dahl | 486 U.S. 622 | 1988 |
| Huffman v. W. Nuclear Inc. | 486 U.S. 663 | 1988 |
| Arizona v. Roberson | 486 U.S. 675 | 1988 |
| Volkswagenwerk A.G. v. J. Schlunk J. | 486 U.S. 694 | 1988 |
| Sun Oil Co. v. Wortman | 486 U.S. 717 | 1988 |
| City of Lakewood v. Plain Dealer Pub. Co. | 486 U.S. 750 | 1988 |
| Christianson v. Colt Industries Operating Corp. | 486 U.S. 800 | 1988 |
| Mackey v. Lanier Collection Agency & Serv. Inc. | 486 U.S. 825 | 1988 |
| Liljeberg v. Health Serv. Acquisition Corp | 486 U.S. 847 | 1988 |
| INS v. Pangilinan | 486 U.S. 875 | 1988 |
| Bendix Autolite Corp v. Midwesco Enterprises Inc. | 486 U.S. 888 | 1988 |
