= 1895 in science =

The year 1895 in science and technology involved some significant events, listed below.

== Astronomy and space sciences ==
- Konstantin Tsiolkovsky proposes a space elevator.

== Biology ==
- April 26 – The New York Zoological Society, the modern-day Wildlife Conservation Society, is chartered.
- David Bruce discovers the Trypanosoma parasite carried by the tsetse fly which causes the fatal cattle disease nagana.

== Chemistry ==
- March 26 – Scottish chemist William Ramsay isolates helium on Earth by treating the mineral cleveite. These samples are identified as helium by Norman Lockyer and William Crookes. It is independently isolated from cleveite in the same year by Per Teodor Cleve and Abraham Langlet in Uppsala, Sweden, who determine its atomic weight.
- Emil Fischer and Arthur Speier first describe Fischer–Speier esterification.
- Carl von Linde files for patent of the Linde cycle.

== Climatology ==
- December 11 – Svante Arrhenius delivers quantified data about the sensitivity of global climate to atmospheric carbon dioxide (the "Greenhouse effect") as he presents his paper "On the Influence of Carbonic Acid in the Air Upon The Temperature of the Ground" to the Royal Swedish Academy of Sciences.

== Ecology ==
- Eugen Warming publishes Plantesamfund (translated as Oecology of Plants, 1909) and founds the scientific discipline ecology.
- The first international meeting for the protection of birds is held in Paris.

== Mathematics ==
- Diederik Korteweg and Gustav de Vries derive the Korteweg–de Vries equation, a description of the development of long solitary water waves in a canal of rectangular cross section.
- Georg Cantor publishes the first part of a paper on set theory containing the arithmetic of infinite cardinal numbers and the continuum hypothesis.
- Henri Poincaré publishes his paper "Analysis Situs", providing the first systematic treatment of topology.
- Gaston Tarry publishes a systematic algorithm for traversing a maze without prior knowledge of its layout.

== Medicine ==
- The term naturopathy is coined by Dr John Scheel.
- Adolphe Pinard invents the Pinard horn, a fetal stethoscope.

== Physics ==
- May 7 – Alexander Stepanovich Popov demonstrates a radio receiver (containing a coherer) refined as a lightning detector to the Russian Physico-Chemical Society, recognized as the first practical application of electromagnetic waves.
- November 8 – Wilhelm Röntgen discovers a type of electromagnetic radiation which he calls X-rays.

== Psychiatry ==
- Sigmund Freud and Josef Breuer publish Studien über Hysterie (Studies on Hysteria).

== Technology ==
- February 13 – Brothers Auguste and Louis Lumière patent their cinematograph motion picture film camera/projector in France.
- March 18 – The world's first gasoline bus route is started in Germany, between Siegen and Netphen.
- March 22 – Auguste and Louis Lumière make what is probably the first presentation of a projected celluloid film moving picture, the 46-second Workers Leaving the Lumière Factory, to members of the Société d'encouragement pour l'industrie nationale in Paris.
- March 30 – Rudolf Diesel patents the Diesel engine in Germany.
- May 6 – The Metropolitan West Side Elevated Railroad is opened in Chicago as the first electrically operated rapid transit system in the United States, including the first completed Scherzer rolling lift bridge.
- June 26 – Second prototype of Rudolf Diesel's Motor 250/400 (220/400) passes brake testing for the first time, using kerosene fuel.
- December 31 – Ogden Bolton Jr. is granted U.S. patent 552,271 for an electric bicycle.
- The world's first portable handheld electric drill is developed by brothers Wilhelm and Carl Fein in Germany.
- Ernest A. Hummel, a jeweler of St. Paul, Minnesota, invents the telediagraph.

== Other events ==
- May – Publication of H. G. Wells' first "scientific romance", the novella The Time Machine (serial publication completed and first book editions).
- July 25 – Maria Skłodowska marries Pierre Curie in the town hall at Sceaux.

== Awards ==
- Copley Medal: Karl Weierstrass
- Wollaston Medal for Geology: Archibald Geikie

== Births ==
- January 11 – Laurens Hammond (died 1973), American inventor.
- January 15 – Artturi Ilmari Virtanen (died 1973), Finnish winner of the Nobel Prize in Chemistry.
- January 21 – Robert Stumper (died 1977), Luxembourgish myrmecologist, chemist and international footballer.
- May 8 – Lionel Whitby (died 1956), English haematologist, clinical pathologist, pharmacologist and army officer.
- May 20 – R. J. Mitchell (died 1937), English aeronautical engineer.
- May 31 – Asatour Sarafian, later Oscar H. Banker (died 1979), Armenian American inventor.
- June 29 – Dorothy Stuart Russell (died 1983), Australian-born British pathologist
- October 19 – Lewis Mumford (died 1990), American historian & philosopher of science.
- October 22 – Rolf Nevanlinna (died 1980), Finnish mathematician.
- October 23 – Hans Ferdinand Mayer (died 1980), German physicist.
- October 30
  - Gerhard Domagk (died 1964), German bacteriologist, winner of the Nobel Prize in Physiology or Medicine.
  - Dickinson W. Richards (died 1964), American pulmonary physiologist, winner of the Nobel Prize in Physiology or Medicine.
- December 2 – W. Conway Pierce (died 1974), American chemist.
- December 24 – Marguerite Williams (died 1991?), African American geologist.

== Deaths ==
- January 26 – Arthur Cayley (born 1821), English mathematician.
- April 11 – Lothar Meyer (born 1830), German chemist.
- May 5 – Carl Vogt (born 1817), German scientist who published notable works in zoology, geology and physiology.
- June 29 – Sir Thomas Henry Huxley (born 1825), English biologist.
- August 10 – Felix Hoppe-Seyler (born 1825), German physiologist.
- August 26 – Friedrich Miescher (born 1844), Swiss biochemist.
- September 24 – Hermann Hellriegel (born 1831), German agricultural chemist who discovered the mechanism by which leguminous plants assimilate the free nitrogen of the atmosphere.
- September 28 – Louis Pasteur (born 1822), French biologist.
- December 27 – Eivind Astrup (born 1871), Norwegian Arctic explorer.
