= Langlet =

Langlet is a surname of French or Swedish origin. People with the name include:

- Abraham Langlet (1868–1936), Swedish chemist, co-discoverer of the element helium
- Amanda Langlet (born 1967), French actress
- Emil Victor Langlet (1824–1898), Swedish architect
- Valdemar Langlet (1872–1960), Swedish publisher and Esperantist; credited with saving many Jews from the Holocaust
- Yoann Langlet (born 1982), French-Mauritanian professional football player
