= Cleveite =

Radioactive variety of uraninite

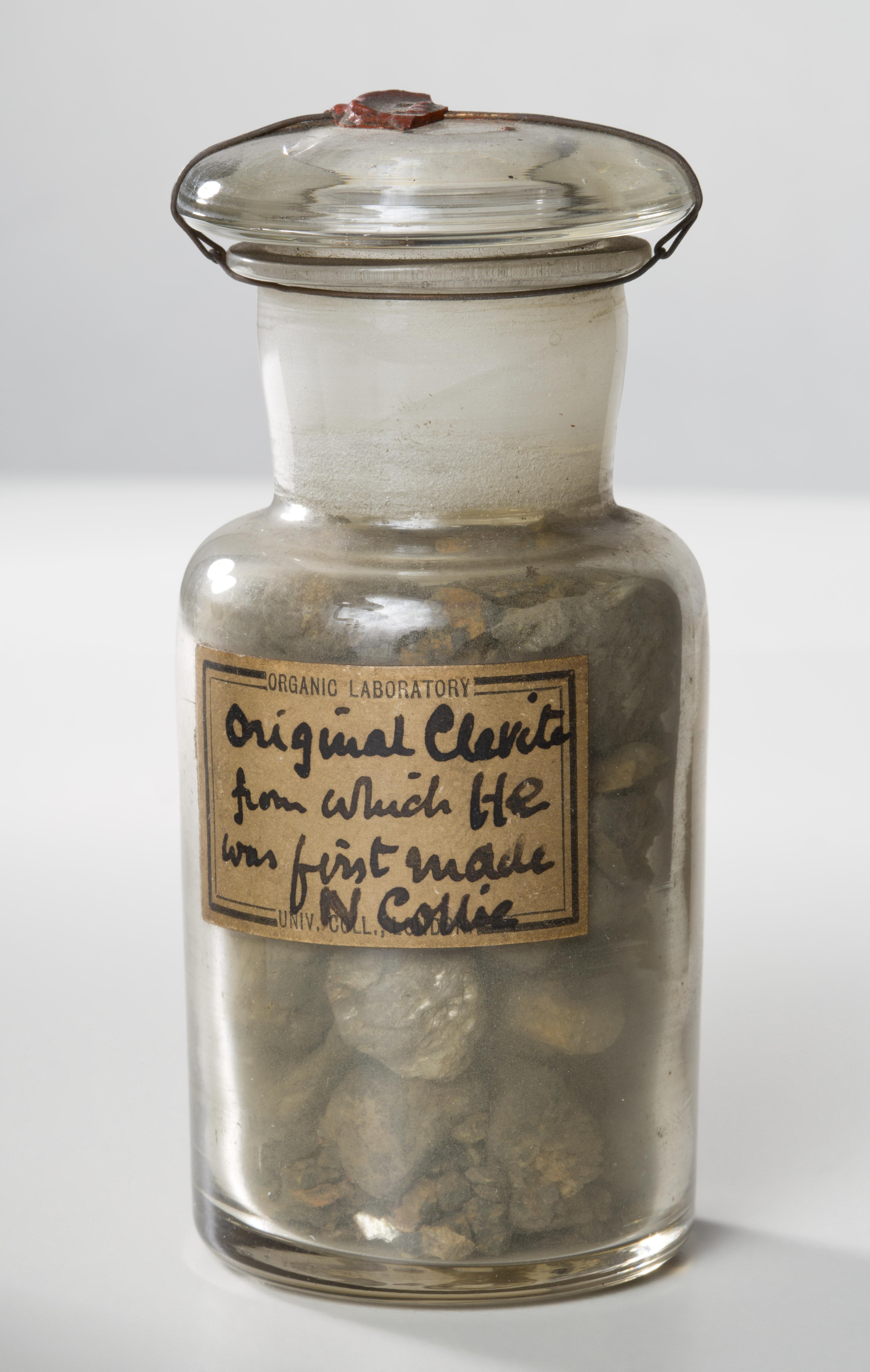
- The cleveite sample from which Ramsay first purified helium, in the collection of University College London

General
- Category: Minerals
- Formula: UO_{2}

Identification

Cleveite is an impure radioactive variety of uraninite containing uranium, found in Norway. It has the composition UO_{2} with about 10% of the uranium substituted by rare-earth elements. It was named after Swedish chemist Per Teodor Cleve. It was first described by Adolf Erik Nordenskiöld in 1878 from the Garta Feldspar quarry in Arendal, Norway. It was described by Ramsey to be "imbedded in felspathic rock, and forms black nodules and veins in the light reddish feldspar".

Cleveite was the first known terrestrial source of helium, which is created over time by alpha decay of the uranium and accumulates trapped (occluded) within the mineral. The first sample of terrestrial helium was obtained by William Ramsay in 1895 when he treated a sample of the mineral with dilute sulfuric acid. Cleve and Abraham Langlet succeeded in isolating helium from cleveite at about the same time.

Yttrogummite is a variant of cleveite, also found in Norway.

== See also ==
- List of minerals
- List of minerals named after people
