= Helium cryogenics =

Applications of liquid helium

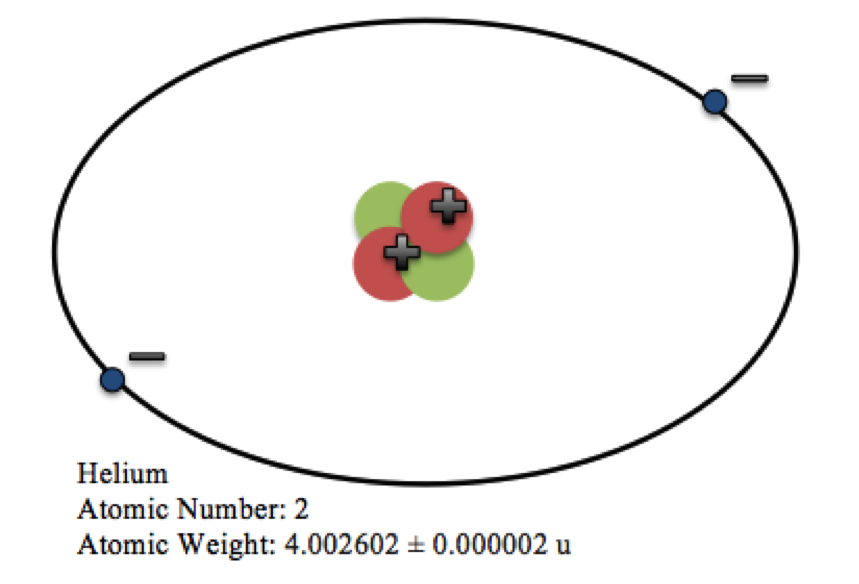

In the field of cryogenics, helium [He] is utilized for a variety of reasons. The combination of helium’s extremely low molecular weight and weak interatomic reactions yield interesting properties when helium is cooled below its critical temperature of 5.2 K to form a liquid. Even at absolute zero (0K), helium does not condense to form a solid under ambient pressure. In this state, the zero point vibrational energies of helium are comparable to very weak interatomic binding interactions, thus preventing lattice formation and giving helium its fluid characteristics. Within this liquid state, helium has two phases referred to as helium I and helium II. Helium I displays thermodynamic and hydrodynamic properties of classical fluids, along with quantum characteristics. However, below its lambda point of 2.17 K, helium transitions to He II and becomes a quantum superfluid with zero viscosity.

Under extreme conditions such as when cooled beyond T_{λ}, helium has the ability to form a new state of matter, known as a Bose–Einstein condensate (BEC), in which the atoms virtually lose all their energy. Without energy to transfer between molecules, the atoms begin to aggregate creating a volume of equivalent density and energy. From observations, liquid helium only exhibits super-fluidity because it contains isolated islands of BECs, which have well-defined magnitude and phase, as well as well-defined phonon–roton (P-R) modes. A phonon refers to a quantum of energy associated with a compressional wave such as the vibration of a crystal lattice while a roton refers to an elementary excitation in superfluid helium. In the BEC’s, the P-R modes have the same energy, which explains the zero point vibrational energies of helium in preventing lattice formation.

When helium is below T_{λ}, the surface of the liquid becomes smoother, indicating the transition from liquid to superfluid. Experiments involving neutron bombardment correlate with the existence of BEC’s, thereby confirming the source of liquid helium’s unique properties such as super-fluidity and heat transfer.

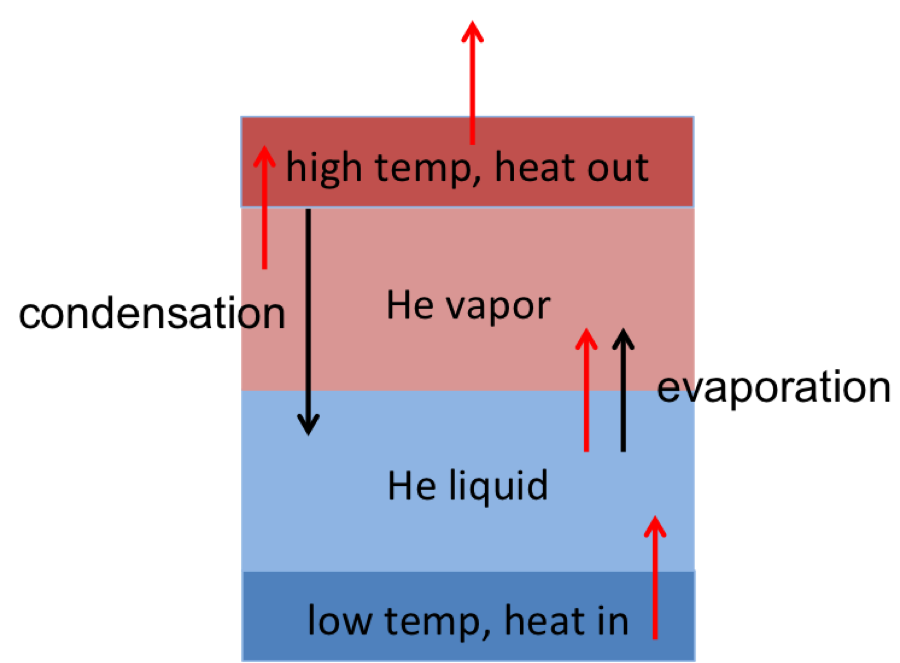
A schematic of a helium cooling system; heat flow is represented by red arrows and helium flow is by black arrows.

Though seemingly paradoxical, cryogenic helium systems can move heat from a volume of relatively low temperature to a volume of relatively high temperature. Though this phenomenon appears to violate the second law of thermodynamics, experiments have shown this to prevail in systems where the volume of low temperature is constantly heated, and the volume of high temperature is constantly cooled. It is believed this phenomenon is related to the heat associated with the phase change between liquid and gaseous helium.

== Applications ==
=== Superconductors ===
Liquid helium is used as a coolant for various superconducting applications. Notable are particle accelerators where magnets are used for steering charged particles. If large magnetic fields are required then superconducting magnets are used. In order for superconductors to be efficient, they must be kept below their respective critical temperature. This requires very efficient heat transfer. Because of the reasons discussed previously, superfluid helium can be used to effectively transfer heat away from superconductors.

=== Quantum computing ===
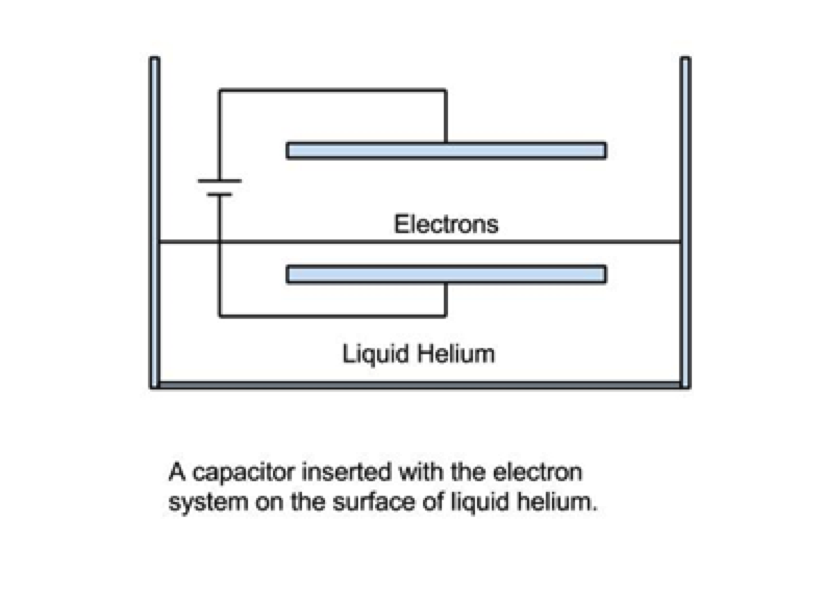

One proposed use for superfluid helium is in quantum computing. Quantum computers utilize the quantum states of matter, such as the electron spin, as individual quantum bits (qubits), a quantum analogue of the bit used in traditional computers to store information and perform processing tasks. The spin states of the electrons present on the surface of superfluid helium in a vacuum show promise as excellent qubits. In order to be considered a usable qubit, a closed system of individual quantum objects must be created that interact with each other, but whose interaction with the outside world is minimal. In addition, the quantum objects must be able to be manipulated by the computer, and the quantum system’s properties must be readable by the computer to signal the termination of a computational function. It is believed that in vacuum, superfluid helium satisfies many of these criteria since a closed system of its electrons can be read and easily manipulated by the computer in a similar fashion as electrostatically manipulated electrons in semiconductor heterostructures. Another beneficial aspect of the liquid helium quantum system is that application of an electrical potential to liquid helium in a vacuum can move qubits with little decoherence. In other words, voltage can manipulate qubits with little effect on the ordering of the phase angles in the wave functions between the components of the liquid helium quantum system.

=== X-ray crystallography ===
The advent of high-flux X-rays provides a useful tool for developing high-resolution structures of proteins. However, higher energy crystallography incurs radiation damage to the proteins studied. Cryogenic helium systems can be used with greater efficacy than nitrogen cryogenic systems to prevent radical damage to protein crystals.

== See also ==
- Dilution refrigerator
