= Per Teodor Cleve =

Swedish chemist who discovered holmium and thulium (1840–1905)

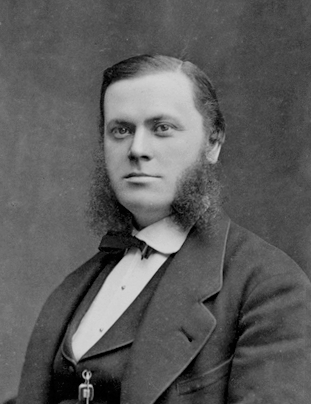
- Per Teodor Cleve, c. 1880–1890
- Born: 10 February 1840; Stockholm, Sweden
- Died: 18 June 1905 (aged 65); Uppsala, Sweden
- Education: Stockholms Lyceum (1858); Uppsala University (1863)
- Known for: discovery of holmium and thulium
- Spouse: Carolina Alma Öhbom (m. 1874)
- Children: Astrid Cleve; Agnes Cleve-Jonand; Célie Brunius
- Awards: Davy Medal (1894)
- Scientific career
- Fields: Chemistry, geology

Per Teodor Cleve (10 February 1840 – 18 June 1905) was a Swedish chemist, biologist, mineralogist and oceanographer. He is best known for his discovery of the chemical elements holmium and thulium.

Born in Stockholm in 1840, Cleve earned his BSc and PhD from Uppsala University in 1863 and 1868, respectively. After receiving his PhD, he became an assistant professor of chemistry at the university. He later became professor of general and agricultural chemistry. In 1874 he theorised that didymium was in fact two elements; this theory was confirmed in 1885 when Carl Auer von Welsbach discovered neodymium and praseodymium.

In 1879 Cleve discovered holmium and thulium. His other contributions to chemistry include the discovery of aminonaphthalenesulfonic acids, also known as Cleve's acids. From 1890 on he focused on biological studies. He developed a method of determining the age and order of late glacial and postglacial deposits from the types of diatom fossils in the deposits, and wrote a seminal text in the field of oceanography. He died in 1905 at age 65.

== Early life ==
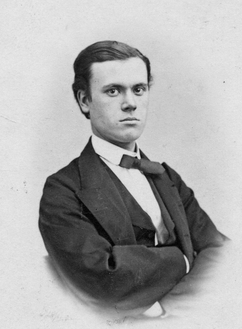
Cleve in 1863

Cleve was born in Stockholm, Sweden, as the thirteenth child of his father, a merchant known as Fredrik Theodor Cleve. Cleve's ancestors on his father's side came from western Germany and settled in Sweden in the late 18th century.

Cleve showed interest in natural science and natural history from an early age. He attended the Stockholms Lyceum in 1858, studying chemistry and biology. He gained a Bachelor of Science degree from the University of Uppsala in 1863 and a PhD from the same university in 1868.

== Career ==
In 1860, aged 20, Cleve became assistant professor of mineralogy at the University of Uppsala, and was appointed assistant professor of chemistry in 1868. He also taught at the Royal Institute of Technology between 1870 and 1874, and eventually became professor of general and agricultural chemistry at the University of Uppsala. He was the chair of chemistry at the University of Uppsala starting in 1874. He was also the president of the Nobel Committee for Chemistry.

Cleve's first work was Några ammoniakaliska chromföreningar (Some compounds of ammonia and chromium, 1861). He also wrote several more papers on complex compounds, including the compounds of platinum. Additionally, Cleve synthesized several hundred complex platinum compounds.

Cleve visited a number of laboratories in England, France, Italy, and Switzerland in the 1860s. While in Paris, he visited the laboratory of Charles-Adolphe Wurtz and also made a number of friends there.

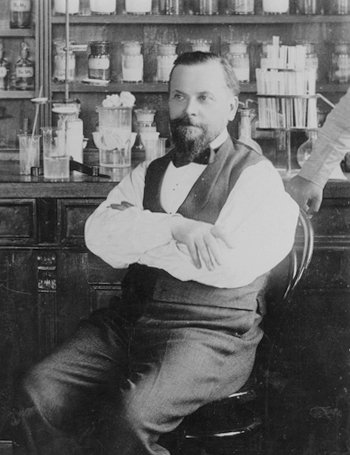
Cleve in the lab, c. 1900

Cleve worked on the synthesis of complex chemical compounds until 1872. He theorized in 1874 that the element didymium consisted of two elements. This theory was proven right with the discovery of praseodymium and neodymium in 1885 by Carl Auer von Welsbach. In 1879, Cleve proved that the newly discovered element scandium was an element predicted by Dmitri Mendeleev to be "eka-boron". He isolated a quantity of scandium in this same year and determined its atomic weight. He discovered the element holmium in 1879 by examining a sample of erbium oxide. While removing impurities from a sample of erbium oxide, Cleve discovered a brown substance and a green substance, and the brown substance was holmium oxide (the green substance was thulium oxide). However, this sample may have been impure. He separated thulium from an erbium oxide sample in 1879. Additionally, Cleve and Abraham Langlet discovered helium in the mineral cleveite in 1895.

Cleve discovered six forms of dichloronaphthalene and discovered aminonaphthalenesulfonic acids, which are sometimes named after him. He prepared a number of nitrosulfonic acids as well. In 1883, Cleve was the first person to describe the plankton species Nitzschia seriata. In 1890, Cleve began to mainly focus on the field of biology, mainly studying freshwater algae, diatoms, and plankton. Cleve participated in a Swedish expedition to Spitsbergen in 1898. While on this mission, he discovered a number of species of spumellarians, nassellarians, and phaeodarians. With Johann Diedrich Möller he issued and distributed an exsiccata-like series of microscope slides under the title Diatoms edited by P. T. Cleve and J. D. Möller.

Cleve, in collaboration with Otto Höglund prepared numerous previously-undiscovered salts of yttrium and erbium. The two also did work on the chemistry of the chemical elements thorium and lanthanum. By 1874, Cleve discovered that thorium was a quadrivalent element and also determined lanthanum to be trivalent. These findings were initially doubted by the scientific community.

Cleve was the first observer of isomerism in platinumamine derivatives.

Additionally, Cleve created a method of dating glacial and post-glacial deposits in the fossil record.

Cleve's PhD dissertation was "Mineral-analytiska under-sökningar". He wrote a paper on samarium in 1879 and The Seasonal Distribution of Atlantic Plankton Organisms in 1900. In 1883, he published Kemiskt Handlexicon, which translates to Chemical Handbook. Notable students of Cleve include Ellen Fries (the first Swedish woman to earn a PhD) and Svante Arrhenius (a winner of the Nobel Prize).

Cleve also studied hydrography and geology.

== Personal life, family, and death ==
In 1874, Cleve married Carolina Alma "Caralma" Öhbom (known as Alma Cleve), a teacher and author; the couple had three daughters. The first daughter, Astrid Maria Cleve (born 22 January 1875), became a botanist. His son-in-law and grandson, Hans von Euler-Chelpin and Ulf von Euler, both won Nobel Prizes. Cleve was friends with Thomas Edward Thorpe. The second daughter, Agnes Cleve-Jonand (born Agnes Elisabet Cleve) (1876-1951), was a visual artist and pioneer of Modernism in Sweden. The third and last daughter, Célie Brunius (born Gerda Cecilia Afrodite Cleve) (1882-1980), was a journalist. His daughter Agnes was married to illustrator, set designer and artist John Jon-And. His daughter Célie was married to writer August Brunius and was the mother of artist Göran Brunius, journalist Clas Brunius and associate professor Teddy Brunius. The television host and politician Lisette Schulman was his great-granddaughter.

Per Teodore Cleve was a supporter of women's equality and Ellen Fries, the first Swedish woman to receive a PhD, was one of his students.

Cleve began experiencing pleurisy in December 1904 and it affected his heart. He thought that he had recovered by the spring of 1905, and he returned home to Uppsala, Sweden,. but he died there on 18 June 1905.

== Awards and legacy ==
Cleve joined the Royal Swedish Academy of Sciences in 1871. He received a Davy Medal in 1894 and 1904.

The mineral cleveite is named for Cleve.
