= Valdemar Langlet =

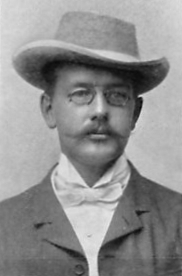
Valdemar Langlet.

Valdemar Langlet (Swedish: [lanˈlé]; December 17, 1872 in Lerbo, Sweden – October 16, 1960 in Stockholm) was a Swedish publisher, and an early Esperantist. With his wife Nina Borovko-Langlet in Budapest, he is credited with saving many Jews from the Holocaust, by providing Swedish documents saying that people were waiting for Swedish nationality. Raoul Wallenberg was inspired by Langlet and used the same method to save Jewish people when he came to Budapest. In 1965, Valdemar and Nina Langlet were recognized as Righteous Among the Nations by Yad Vashem.

== Early life ==
He was the son of architect Emil Victor Langlet and his wife author Clara Mathilda Ulrika Clementine Söderén (1832-1904). His brother included chemist Abraham Langlet (1868-1936).

After his student years (in Germany, Austria and Switzerland) he worked as an engineer, and later journalist and editor of many Swedish newspapers (among others, Svensk Handelstidning and Svenska Dagbladet). He wrote books about current affairs and about voyages to Russia and Hungary. In 1890, he learned Esperanto, and was a founding member of the Esperanto club of Uppsala in 1891, the second Esperanto club in the world, and for many years he served as president of the club. When the Swedish Esperanto Federation was founded in 1906, he became its president, until the great Ido-schism during Easter of 1909.

In 1899, he married a Finnish esperantist Signe Blomberg from Turku. After her death in 1921, he met Nina Borovko, the daughter of Nikolai Afrikanovich Borovko, a friend and a pioneering Esperantist in Russia. In 1925, Valdemar and Nina married.

In 1932, Langlet was hired by the University of Budapest, where he served as lecturer on the Swedish language. At the same time, he worked as an officer in the Swedish Embassy in Budapest.

== War years ==
In 1944, when World War II became more and more dangerous for the life of Hungarians, Langlet still worked at the university and the embassy. He saw the cruel persecution not only of Jews, but also other people not favored by the fascist regime. Together with his wife Nina, he initiated humanitarian work under the protection of the Swedish Red Cross. At first, he helped his own acquaintances one at a time. But little by little the group grew, and soon he had a long line of people at his door begging his help.

Nina and Valdemar's home no longer was sufficient for his humanitarian work. They searched and rented apartments, homes and farms. People who left town gave their home to the Langlets. Many locations, both in Budapest and the surrounding areas, they arranged for orphanages and safehouses for older people. They distributed food and medicine. In some of these homes, they occasionally secretly hid people who were persecuted because they were Jews, or people who for one reason or another were unwanted by the Hungarian fascists or the German SS.

During the last year of the war, thousands and thousands of Hungarian Jews were transported to certain death in German concentration camps. Langlet already during his first years in Budapest established warm interrelations with many Jewish families. In early 1944, he suddenly noticed that some people he knew disappeared without warning. Other people secretly sought Langlet to express their fear of arrest and transport to the camps. Langlet now understood what he had to do. By means of official actions of the Swedish Embassy, he could help some people which had some kind of relation to Sweden. For others he could do nothing. The situation seemed hopelessly dark. Although he did not have the right to act without sanction of the Swedish authorities in Stockholm, he set up a special protective unit of the embassy, and afterward in his home office. In the name of the Swedish Red Cross he started to publish printed verification documents attesting Swedish citizenship and because of that, the person carrying it was under "special Swedish protection."
