= Yttrogummite =

General
- Category: Minerals

Identification
- Other characteristics: Radioactive

Yttrogummite is an yttrium-bearing variety of gummite mineral. It is a rare earth mineral containing relatively large amounts of the yttrium earths. It is an alteration product of yttrian uraninite.

It was first described by Adolf Erik Nordenskiöld in 1878, from the Garta Feldspar quarry in Arendal, Norway.
