= Helium =

Helium, _{2}He
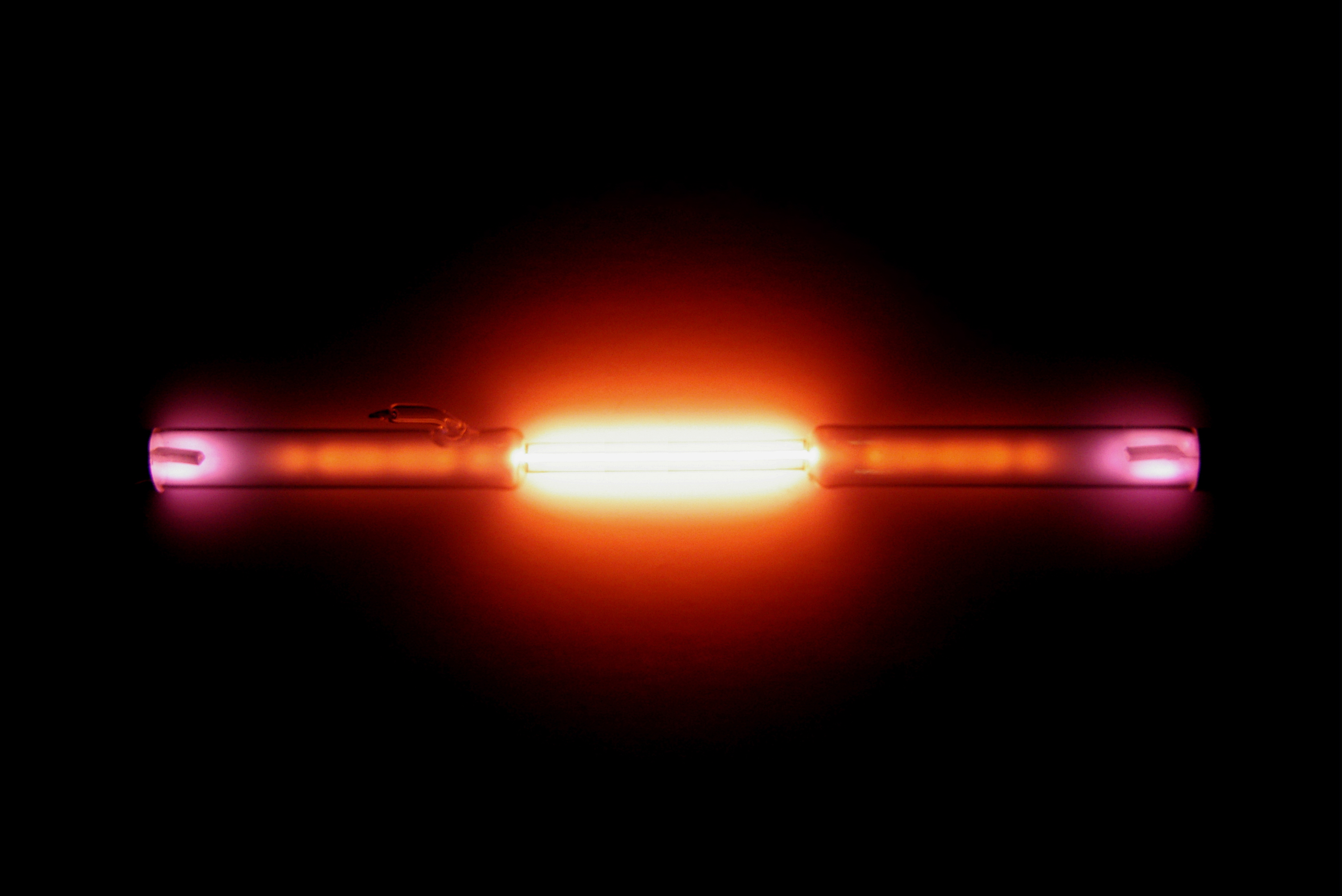

Helium
- Pronunciation: /ˈhiːliəm/ (HEE-lee-əm)
- Appearance: colorless gas, exhibiting a gray, cloudy glow (or reddish-orange if an especially high voltage is used) when placed in an electric field

Standard atomic weight A_{r}°(He)
- 4.002602±0.000002; 4.0026±0.0001 (abridged)

Helium in the periodic table
Hydrogen																															Helium
Lithium	Beryllium																									Boron	Carbon	Nitrogen	Oxygen	Fluorine	Neon
Sodium	Magnesium																									Aluminium	Silicon	Phosphorus	Sulfur	Chlorine	Argon
Potassium	Calcium															Scandium	Titanium	Vanadium	Chromium	Manganese	Iron	Cobalt	Nickel	Copper	Zinc	Gallium	Germanium	Arsenic	Selenium	Bromine	Krypton
Rubidium	Strontium															Yttrium	Zirconium	Niobium	Molybdenum	Technetium	Ruthenium	Rhodium	Palladium	Silver	Cadmium	Indium	Tin	Antimony	Tellurium	Iodine	Xenon
Caesium	Barium	Lanthanum	Cerium	Praseodymium	Neodymium	Promethium	Samarium	Europium	Gadolinium	Terbium	Dysprosium	Holmium	Erbium	Thulium	Ytterbium	Lutetium	Hafnium	Tantalum	Tungsten	Rhenium	Osmium	Iridium	Platinum	Gold	Mercury (element)	Thallium	Lead	Bismuth	Polonium	Astatine	Radon
Francium	Radium	Actinium	Thorium	Protactinium	Uranium	Neptunium	Plutonium	Americium	Curium	Berkelium	Californium	Einsteinium	Fermium	Mendelevium	Nobelium	Lawrencium	Rutherfordium	Dubnium	Seaborgium	Bohrium	Hassium	Meitnerium	Darmstadtium	Roentgenium	Copernicium	Nihonium	Flerovium	Moscovium	Livermorium	Tennessine	Oganesson
–
↑
He
↓
Ne
hydrogen ← helium → lithium
- Atomic number (Z): 2
- Group: group 18 (noble gases)
- Period: period 1
- Block: s-block
- Electron configuration: 1s^{2}
- Electrons per shell: 2

Physical properties
- Phase at STP: gas
- Boiling point: 4.222 K (−268.928 °C, −452.070 °F)
- Density (at STP): 0.1786 g/L
- when liquid (at b.p.): 0.125 g/cm^{3}
- Triple point: 2.177 K, 5.043 kPa
- Critical point: 5.1953 K, 0.22746 MPa
- Heat of fusion: 0.0138 kJ/mol
- Heat of vaporization: 0.0829 kJ/mol
- Molar heat capacity: 20.78 J/(mol·K)
- Specific heat capacity: 5191.625 J/(kg·K)
Vapor pressure (defined by ITS-90)
P (Pa)	1	10	100	1 k	10 k	100 k
at T (K)			1.23	1.67	2.48	4.21

Atomic properties
- Oxidation states: common: (none)
- Electronegativity: Pauling scale: no data
- Ionization energies: 1st: 2372.3 kJ/mol; 2nd: 5250.5 kJ/mol
- Atomic radius: empirical: 31 pm
- Covalent radius: 28 pm
- Van der Waals radius: 140 pm
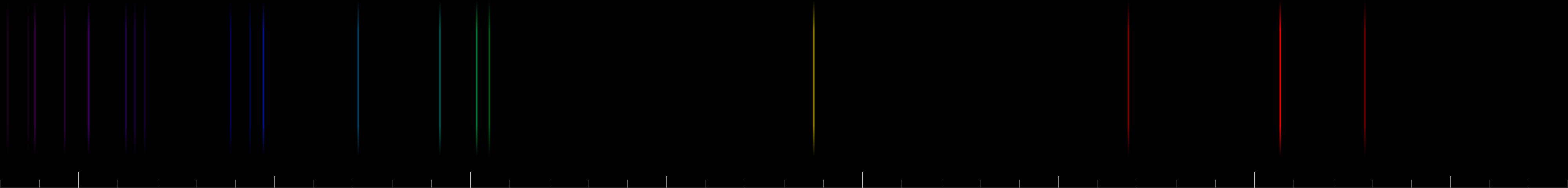
- Spectral lines of helium

Other properties
- Natural occurrence: primordial
- Crystal structure: hexagonal close-packed (hcp)
- Thermal conductivity: 0.1513 W/(m⋅K)
- Magnetic ordering: diamagnetic
- Molar magnetic susceptibility: −1.88×10^{−6} cm^{3}/mol (298 K)
- Speed of sound: 972 m/s
- CAS Number: 7440-59-7

History
- Naming: after Helios, Greek god of the Sun
- Discovery: Norman Lockyer (1868)
- First isolation: William Ramsay, Per Teodor Cleve, Abraham Langlet (1895)

Isotopes of helium
Main isotopes			Decay	
Isotope	abundance	half-life (t_{1/2})	mode	product
^{3}He	0.0002%	stable		
^{4}He	99.9998%	stable		

Helium (from Ancient Greek: ἥλιος, romanized: helios, lit. 'sun') is a chemical element; it has symbol He and atomic number 2. It is a colorless, odorless, non-toxic, inert, monatomic gas and the first in the noble gas group in the periodic table. (Note: A few authors dispute the placement of helium in the noble gas column, preferring to place it above beryllium with the alkaline earth metals. They do so on the grounds of helium's 1s^{2} electron configuration, which is analogous to the ns^{2} valence configurations of the alkaline earth metals, and furthermore point to some specific trends that are more regular if helium is placed in group 2. These tend to relate to kainosymmetry and the first-row anomaly: the first orbital of any type is unusually small, since unlike its higher analogues, it does not experience interelectronic repulsion from a smaller orbital of the same type. Because of this trend in the sizes of orbitals, a large difference in atomic radii between the first and second members of each main group is seen in groups 1 and 13–17: it exists between neon and argon, and between helium and beryllium, but not between helium and neon. This similarly affects the noble gases' boiling points and solubilities in water, where helium is too close to neon, and the large difference characteristic between the first two elements of a group appears only between neon and argon. Moving helium to group 2 makes this trend consistent in groups 2 and 18 as well, by making helium the first group 2 element and neon the first group 18 element: both exhibit the characteristic properties of a kainosymmetric first element of a group. However, the classification of helium with the other noble gases remains near-universal, as its extraordinary inertness is extremely close to that of the other light noble gases neon and argon.) Its boiling point is the lowest among all the elements, and it does not have a melting point at standard pressures. It is the second-lightest and second-most abundant element in the observable universe, after hydrogen. It is present at about 24% of the total elemental mass, which is more than 12 times the mass of all the heavier elements combined. Its abundance is similar to this in both the Sun and Jupiter, because of the very high nuclear binding energy (per nucleon) of helium-4 with respect to the next three elements after helium. This helium-4 binding energy also accounts for why it is a product of both nuclear fusion and radioactive decay. The most common isotope of helium in the universe is helium-4, the vast majority of which was formed during the Big Bang. Large amounts of helium are created by nuclear fusion of hydrogen in stars.

Helium was first detected as an unknown, yellow spectral line signature in sunlight during a solar eclipse in 1868 by Georges Rayet, Captain C. T. Haig, Norman R. Pogson, and Lieutenant John Herschel, and was subsequently confirmed by French astronomer Jules Janssen. Janssen is often jointly credited with detecting the element, along with Norman Lockyer. Janssen recorded the helium spectral line during the solar eclipse of 1868, while Lockyer observed it from Britain. However, only Lockyer proposed that the line was due to a new element, which he named after the Sun. The formal discovery of the element was made in 1895 by chemists Sir William Ramsay, Per Teodor Cleve, and Nils Abraham Langlet, who found helium emanating from the uranium ore cleveite, which is no longer regarded as a separate mineral species, but as a variety of uraninite. In 1903, large reserves of helium were found in natural gas fields in parts of the United States, by far the largest supplier of the gas.

Liquid helium is used in cryogenics (its largest single use, consuming about a quarter of production), and in the cooling of superconducting magnets, with its main commercial application in MRI scanners. Helium's other industrial uses—as a pressurizing and purge gas, as a protective atmosphere for arc welding, and in processes such as growing crystals to make silicon wafers—account for half of the gas produced. A small but well-known use is as a lifting gas in balloons and airships. As with any gas whose density differs from that of air, inhaling a small volume of helium temporarily changes the timbre and quality of the human voice. In scientific research, the behavior of the two fluid phases of helium-4 (helium I and helium II) is important to researchers studying quantum mechanics (in particular the property of superfluidity) and to those looking at the phenomena, such as superconductivity, produced in matter near absolute zero.

On Earth, it is relatively rare—5.2 ppm by volume in the atmosphere. Most terrestrial helium present today is created by the natural radioactive decay of heavy radioactive elements (thorium and uranium, although there are other examples), as the alpha particles emitted by such decays consist of helium-4 nuclei. This radiogenic helium is trapped with natural gas in concentrations as great as 7% by volume, from which it is extracted commercially by a low-temperature separation process called fractional distillation. Terrestrial helium is a non-renewable resource because once released into the atmosphere, it promptly escapes into space. Its supply is thought to be rapidly diminishing. However, some studies suggest that helium produced deep in the Earth by radioactive decay can collect in natural gas reserves in larger-than-expected quantities, in some cases having been released by volcanic activity.

== History ==
=== Scientific discoveries ===
The first evidence of helium was observed on August 18, 1868, as a bright yellow line with a wavelength of 587.49 nanometers in the spectrum of the chromosphere of the Sun. The line was detected by French astronomer Jules Janssen during a total solar eclipse in Guntur, India. This line was initially assumed to be sodium. On October 20 of the same year, English astronomer Norman Lockyer observed a yellow line in the solar spectrum, which he named the D_{3} because it was near the known D_{1} and D_{2} Fraunhofer lines of sodium. He concluded that it was caused by an element in the Sun unknown on Earth. Lockyer named the element helium, from the Greek word for the Sun, ἥλιος (helios). It is sometimes said that English chemist Edward Frankland was also involved in the naming, but this is unlikely as he doubted the existence of this new element. The ending "-ium" is unusual, as it normally applies only to metallic elements; probably Lockyer, being an astronomer, was unaware of the chemical conventions.

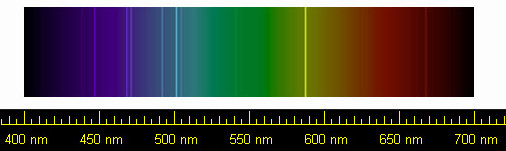
Spectral lines of helium

In 1881, Italian physicist Luigi Palmieri detected helium on Earth for the first time through its D_{3} spectral line, when he analyzed a material that had been sublimated during a recent eruption of Mount Vesuvius.

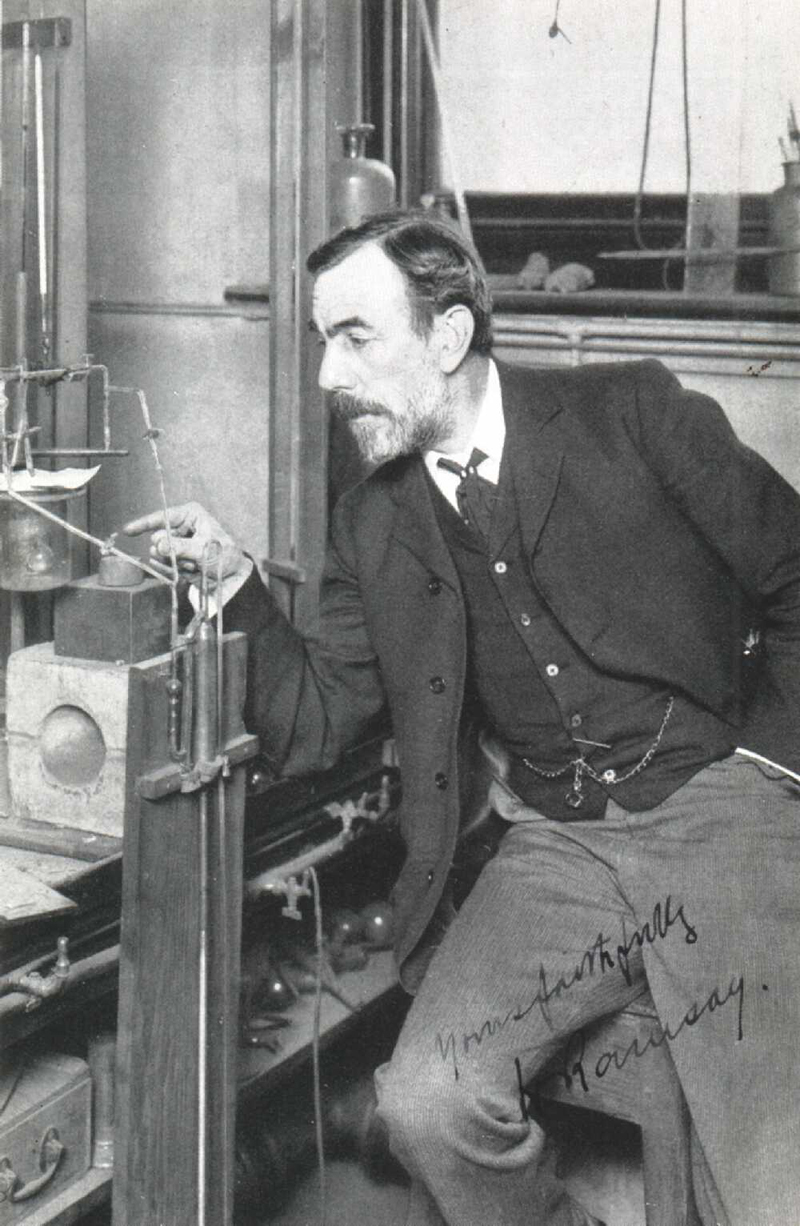
Sir William Ramsay, the discoverer of terrestrial helium

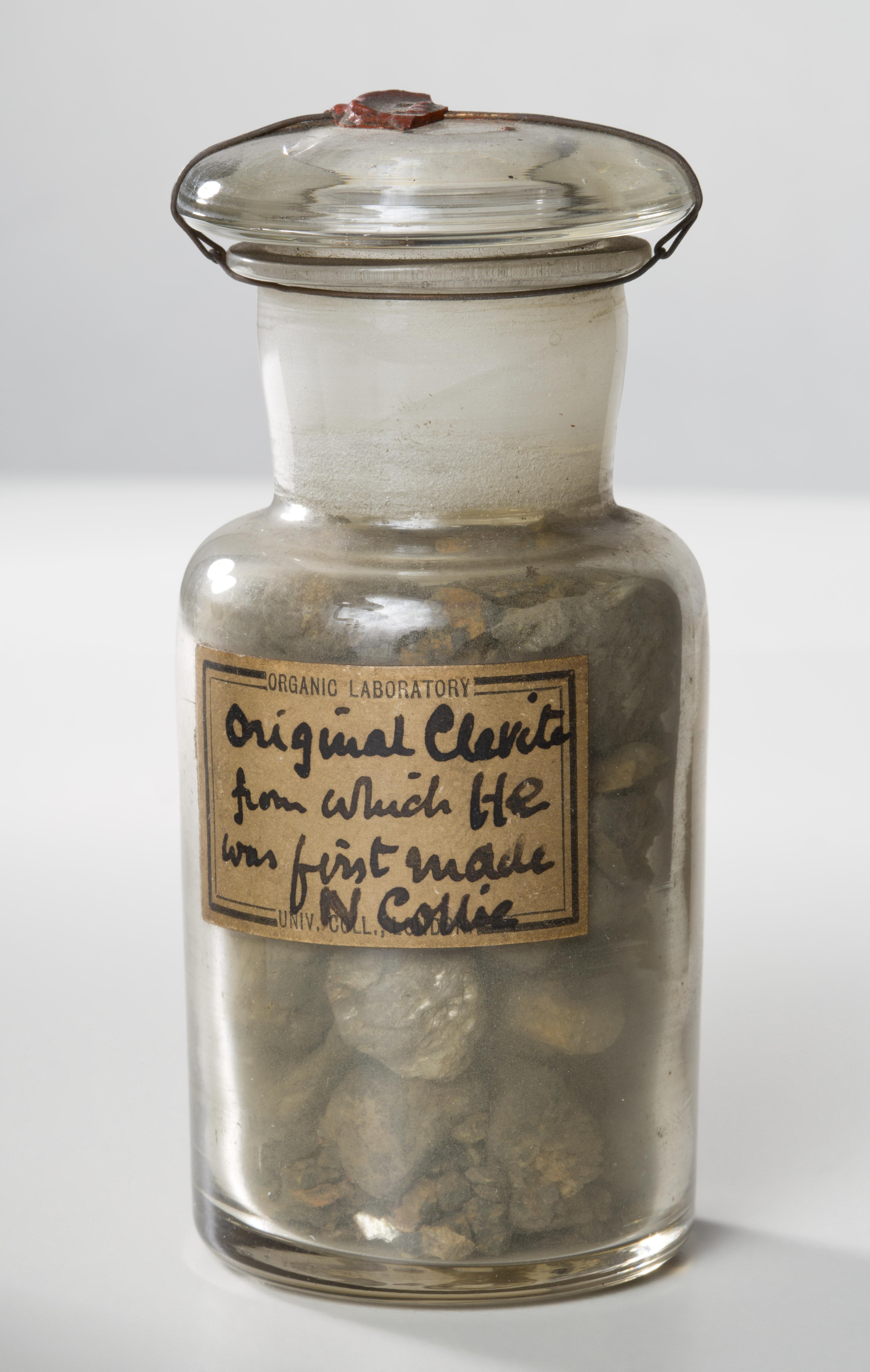
The cleveite sample from which Ramsay first purified helium

On March 26, 1895, Scottish chemist Sir William Ramsay isolated helium on Earth by treating the mineral cleveite (a variety of uraninite with at least 10% rare-earth elements) with mineral acids. Ramsay was looking for argon but, after separating nitrogen and oxygen from the gas, liberated by sulfuric acid, he noticed a bright yellow line that matched the D_{3} line observed in the spectrum of the Sun. These samples were identified as helium by Lockyer and British physicist William Crookes. It was independently isolated from cleveite in the same year by chemists Per Teodor Cleve and Abraham Langlet in Uppsala, Sweden, who collected enough of the gas to accurately determine its atomic weight. Before he was aware of the identity with Lockyer's helium, Ramsay originally intended to name the new gas krypton, a name he later reused for one of the heavier noble gases. Helium was also isolated by American geochemist William Francis Hillebrand prior to Ramsay's discovery, when he noticed unusual spectral lines while testing a sample of the mineral uraninite. Hillebrand, however, attributed the lines to nitrogen. His letter of congratulations to Ramsay offers an interesting case of discovery, and near-discovery, in science.

In 1907, Ernest Rutherford and Thomas Royds demonstrated that alpha particles are helium nuclei by allowing the particles to penetrate the thin glass wall of an evacuated tube, then creating a discharge in the tube, to study the spectrum of the new gas inside. In 1908, helium was first liquefied by Dutch physicist Heike Kamerlingh Onnes by cooling the gas to less than 5 K (−268.15 °C; −450.67 °F). He tried to solidify it by further reducing the temperature but failed, because helium does not solidify at atmospheric pressure. Onnes' student Willem Hendrik Keesom was eventually able to solidify 1 cm^{3} of helium in 1926 by applying additional external pressure.

In 1913, Niels Bohr published his "trilogy" on atomic structure that included a reconsideration of the Pickering–Fowler series as central evidence in support of his model of the atom. This series is named for Edward Charles Pickering, who in 1896 published observations of previously unknown lines in the spectrum of the star ζ Puppis (these are now known to occur with Wolf–Rayet and other hot stars). Pickering attributed the observation (lines at 455.1, 541.1, and 1012.3 nm) to a new form of hydrogen with half-integer transition levels. In 1912, Alfred Fowler managed to produce similar lines from a hydrogen-helium mixture, and supported Pickering's conclusion as to their origin. Bohr's model does not allow for half-integer transitions (nor does quantum mechanics) and Bohr concluded that Pickering and Fowler were wrong, and instead assigned these spectral lines to ionised helium, He^{+}. Fowler was initially skeptical but was ultimately convinced that Bohr was correct, and by 1915 "spectroscopists had transferred [the Pickering–Fowler series] definitively [from hydrogen] to helium." Bohr's theoretical work on the Pickering series had demonstrated the need for "a re-examination of problems that seemed already to have been solved within classical theories" and provided important confirmation for his atomic theory.

In 1938, Russian physicist Pyotr Leonidovich Kapitsa discovered that helium-4 has almost no viscosity at temperatures near absolute zero, a phenomenon now called superfluidity. This phenomenon is related to Bose–Einstein condensation. In 1972, the same phenomenon was observed in helium-3, but at temperatures much closer to absolute zero, by American physicists Douglas D. Osheroff, David M. Lee, and Robert C. Richardson. The phenomenon in helium-3 is thought to be related to pairing of helium-3 fermions to make bosons, in analogy to the Cooper pairs of electrons producing superconductivity.

In 1961, Vignos and Fairbank reported the existence of a different phase of solid helium-4, designated the gamma-phase. It exists for a narrow range of pressure between 1.45 K (−271.70 °C; −457.06 °F) and 1.78 K (−271.37 °C; −456.47 °F).

=== Extraction and use ===
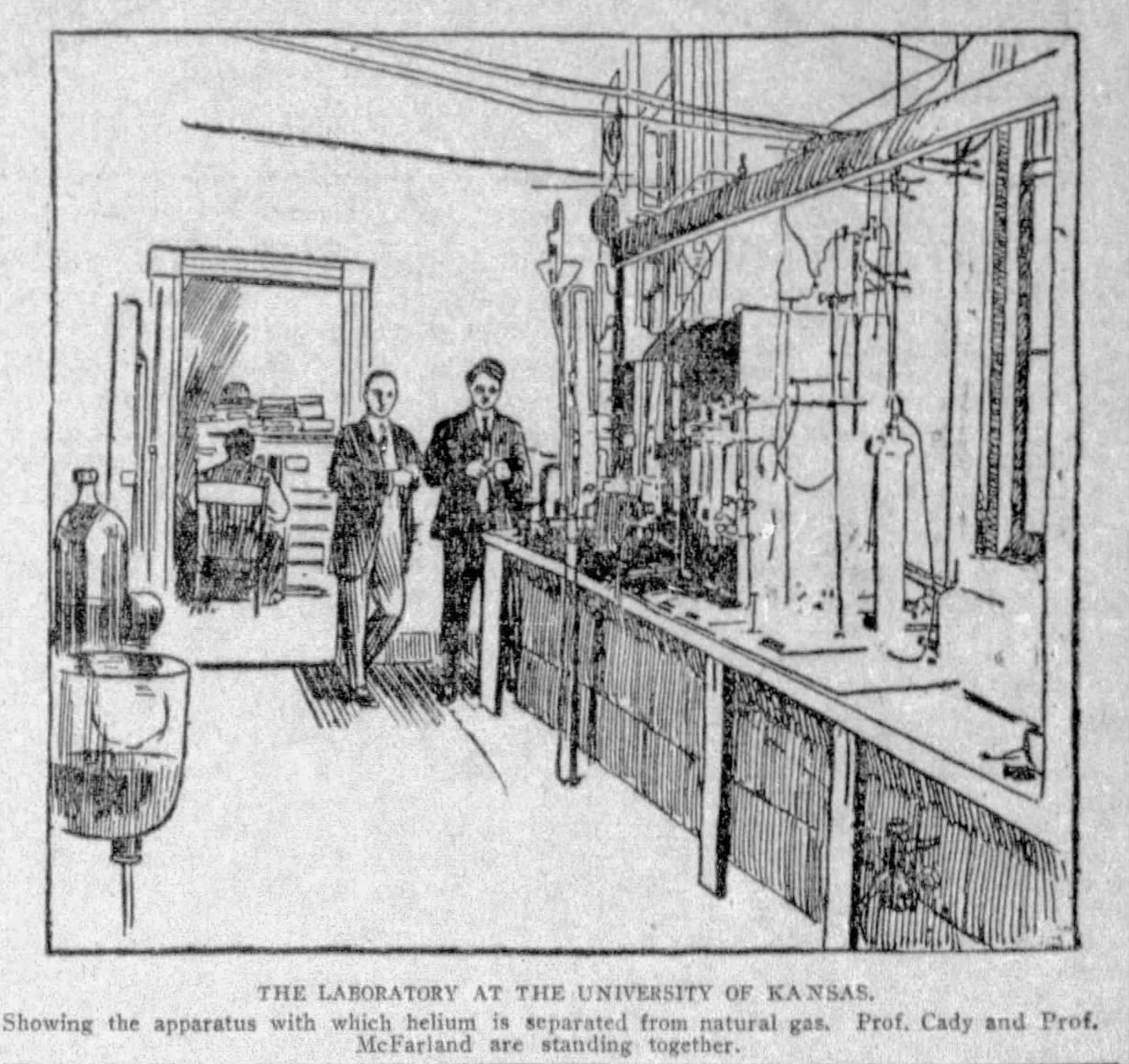
The Kansas City Star's coverage of Cady and McFarland's experiments at KU

After an oil drilling operation in 1903 in Dexter, Kansas produced a gas geyser that would not burn, Kansas geologist Erasmus Haworth collected samples of the escaping gas and took them back to the University of Kansas at Lawrence where, with the help of chemists Hamilton Cady and David McFarland, he discovered that the gas consisted of, by volume, 72% nitrogen, 15% methane (a combustible percentage only with sufficient oxygen), 1% hydrogen, and 12% an unidentifiable gas. With further analysis, Cady and McFarland discovered that 1.84% of the gas sample was helium. This showed that despite its overall rarity on Earth, helium was concentrated in large quantities under the American Great Plains, available for extraction as a byproduct of natural gas.

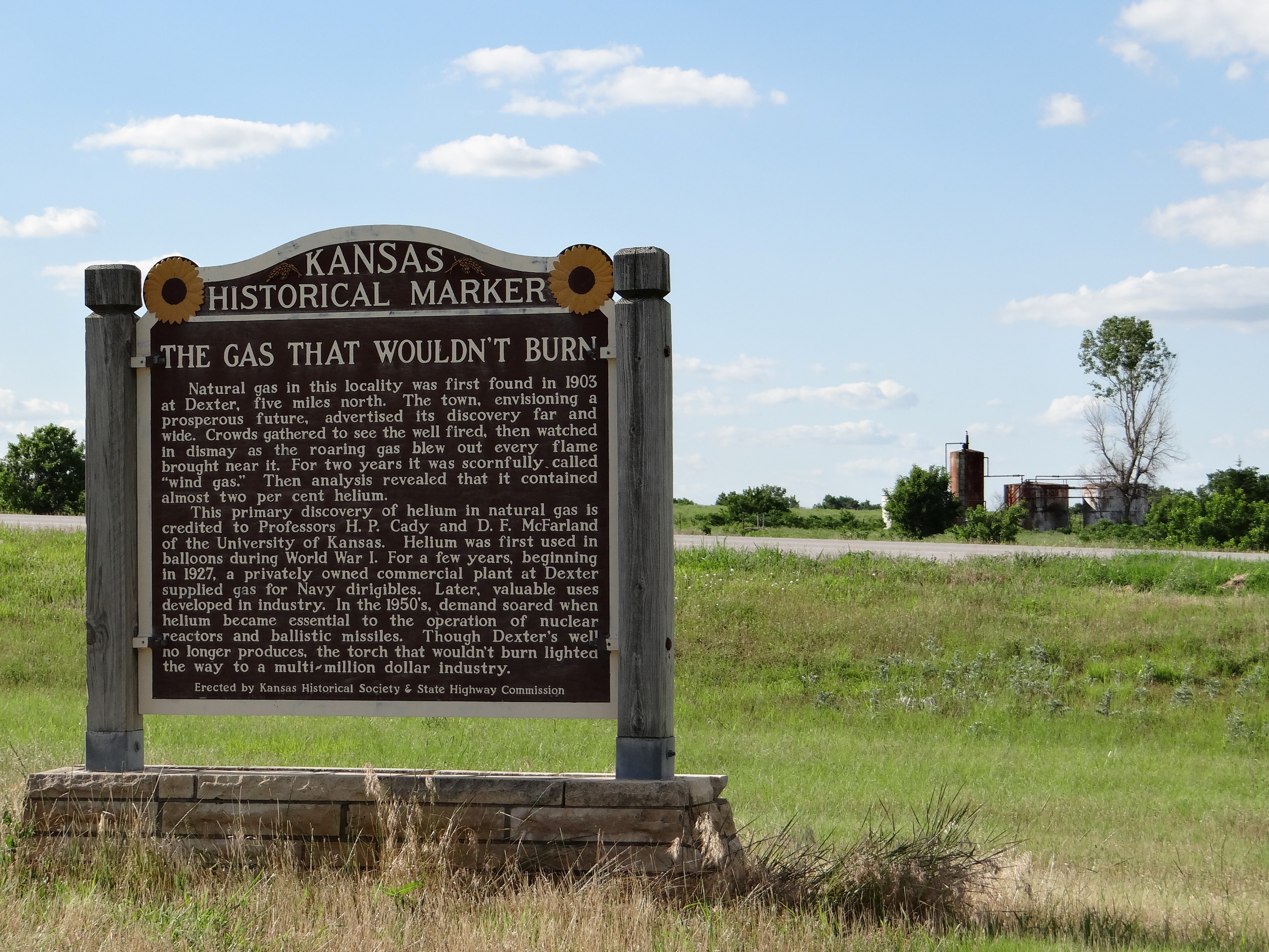
Historical marker, denoting a massive helium find near Dexter, Kansas

Following a suggestion by Sir Richard Threlfall, the United States Navy sponsored three small experimental helium plants during World War I. The goal was to supply barrage balloons with the non-flammable, lighter-than-air gas. A total of 5,700 m^{3} (200,000 ft^{3}) of 92% helium was produced in the program even though less than a cubic meter of the gas had previously been obtained. Some of this gas was used in the world's first helium-filled airship, the U.S. Navy's C-class blimp C-7, which flew its maiden voyage from Hampton Roads, Virginia, to Bolling Field in Washington, D.C., on December 1, 1921, nearly two years before the Navy's first rigid helium-filled airship, the Naval Aircraft Factory-built USS Shenandoah, flew in September 1923.

Although the extraction process using low-temperature gas liquefaction was not developed in time to be significant during World War I, production continued. Helium was primarily used as a lifting gas in lighter-than-air craft. During World War II, the demand increased for helium for lifting gas and for shielded arc welding. The helium mass spectrometer was also vital in the atomic bomb Manhattan Project.

The government of the United States set up the National Helium Reserve in 1925 at Amarillo, Texas, with the goal of supplying military airships in time of war and commercial airships in peacetime. Because of the Helium Act of 1925, which banned the export of scarce helium on which the US then had a production monopoly, together with the prohibitive cost of the gas, German Zeppelins were forced to use hydrogen as lifting gas, which would gain infamy in the Hindenburg disaster. The helium market after World War II was depressed but the reserve was expanded in the 1950s to ensure a supply of liquid helium as a coolant to create oxygen/hydrogen rocket fuel (among other uses) during the Space Race and Cold War. Helium use in the United States in 1965 was more than eight times the peak wartime consumption.

After the Helium Acts Amendments of 1960 (Public Law 86–777), the U.S. Bureau of Mines arranged for five private plants to recover helium from natural gas. For this helium conservation program, the Bureau built a 425-mile (684 km) pipeline from Bushton, Kansas, to connect those plants with the government's partially depleted Cliffside gas field near Amarillo, Texas. This helium-nitrogen mixture was injected and stored in the Cliffside gas field until needed, at which time it was further purified.

By 1995, a billion cubic meters of the gas had been collected and the reserve was US$1.4 billion in debt, prompting the Congress of the United States in 1996 to discontinue the reserve. The resulting Helium Privatization Act of 1996 (Public Law 104–273) directed the United States Department of the Interior to empty the reserve, with sales starting by 2005.

Helium produced between 1930 and 1945 was about 98.3% pure (2% nitrogen), which was adequate for airships. In 1945, a small amount of 99.9% helium was produced for welding use. By 1949, commercial quantities of Grade A 99.95% helium were available.

For many years, the United States produced more than 90% of commercially usable helium in the world, while extraction plants in Canada, Poland, Russia, and other nations produced the remainder. In the mid-1990s, a new plant in Arzew, Algeria, producing 17 million cubic metres (600 million cubic feet) began operation, with enough production to cover all of Europe's demand. Meanwhile, by 2000, the consumption of helium within the U.S. had risen to more than 15 million kg per year. In 2004–2006, additional plants in Ras Laffan, Qatar, and Skikda, Algeria were built. Algeria quickly became the second leading producer of helium. Through this time, both helium consumption and the costs of producing helium increased. From 2002 to 2007 helium prices doubled.

As of 2012, the United States National Helium Reserve accounted for 30 percent of the world's helium. The reserve was expected to run out of helium in 2018. Despite that, a proposed bill in the United States Senate would allow the reserve to continue to sell the gas. Other large reserves were in the Hugoton in Kansas, United States, and nearby gas fields of Kansas and the panhandles of Texas and Oklahoma. New helium plants were scheduled to open in 2012 in Qatar, Russia, and the US state of Wyoming, but they were not expected to ease the shortage.

In 2013, Qatar started up the world's largest helium unit, although the 2017 Qatar diplomatic crisis severely affected helium production there. 2014 was widely acknowledged to be a year of over-supply in the helium business, following years of renowned shortages. Nasdaq reported (2015) that for Air Products, an international corporation that sells gases for industrial use, helium volumes remain under economic pressure due to feedstock supply constraints.

== Characteristics ==
=== Atom ===
The helium atom. Depicted are the nucleus (pink) and the electron cloud distribution (black). The nucleus (upper right) in helium-4 is in reality spherically symmetric and closely resembles the electron cloud, although for more complicated nuclei this is not always the case.

==== In quantum mechanics ====
In the perspective of quantum mechanics, helium is the second simplest atom to model, following the hydrogen atom. Helium is composed of two electrons in atomic orbitals surrounding a nucleus containing two protons and (usually) two neutrons. As in Newtonian mechanics, no system that consists of more than two particles can be solved with an exact analytical mathematical approach (see 3-body problem) and helium is no exception. Thus, numerical mathematical methods are required, even to solve the system of one nucleus and two electrons. Such computational chemistry methods have been used to create a quantum mechanical picture of helium electron binding which is accurate to within < 2% of the correct value, in a few computational steps. Such models show that each electron in helium partly screens the nucleus from the other, so that the effective nuclear charge Z_{eff} which each electron sees is about 1.69 units, not the 2 charges of a classic "bare" helium nucleus.

==== Related stability of the helium-4 nucleus and electron shell ====
The nucleus of the helium-4 atom is identical with an alpha particle. High-energy electron-scattering experiments show its charge to decrease exponentially from a maximum at a central point, exactly as does the charge density of helium's own electron cloud. This symmetry reflects similar underlying physics: the pair of neutrons and the pair of protons in helium's nucleus obey the same quantum mechanical rules as do helium's pair of electrons (although the nuclear particles are subject to a different nuclear binding potential), so that all these fermions fully occupy 1s orbitals in pairs, none of them possessing orbital angular momentum, and each cancelling the other's intrinsic spin. This arrangement is thus energetically extremely stable for all these particles and has astrophysical implications. Namely, adding another particle – proton, neutron, or alpha particle – would consume rather than release energy; all systems with mass number 5, as well as beryllium-8 (comprising two alpha particles), are unbound.

For example, the stability and low energy of the electron cloud state in helium accounts for the element's chemical inertness, and also the lack of interaction of helium atoms with each other, producing the lowest melting and boiling points of all the elements. In a similar way, the particular energetic stability of the helium-4 nucleus, produced by similar effects, accounts for the ease of helium-4 production in atomic reactions that involve either heavy-particle emission or fusion. Some stable helium-3 (two protons and one neutron) is produced in fusion reactions from hydrogen, though its estimated abundance in the universe is about 10^{−5} relative to helium-4.

Binding energy per nucleon of common isotopes. The binding energy per particle of helium-4 is significantly larger than all nearby nuclides.

The unusual stability of the helium-4 nucleus is also important cosmologically: it explains the fact that in the first few minutes after the Big Bang, as the "soup" of free protons and neutrons which had initially been created in about 6:1 ratio cooled to the point that nuclear binding was possible, almost all first compound atomic nuclei to form were helium-4 nuclei. Owing to the relatively tight binding of helium-4 nuclei, its production consumed nearly all of the free neutrons in a few minutes, before they could beta-decay, and thus few neutrons were available to form heavier atoms such as lithium, beryllium, or boron. Helium-4 nuclear binding per nucleon is stronger than in any of these elements (see nucleogenesis and binding energy) and thus, once helium had been formed, no energetic drive was available to make elements 3, 4 and 5. It is barely energetically favorable for helium to fuse into the next element with a lower energy per nucleon, carbon. However, due to the short lifetime of the intermediate beryllium-8, this process requires three helium nuclei striking each other nearly simultaneously (see triple-alpha process). There was thus no time for significant carbon to be formed in the few minutes after the Big Bang, before the early expanding universe cooled to the temperature and pressure point where helium fusion to carbon was no longer possible. This left the early universe with a very similar ratio of hydrogen/helium as is observed today (3 parts hydrogen to 1 part helium-4 by mass), with nearly all the neutrons in the universe trapped in helium-4.

All heavier elements (including those necessary for rocky planets like the Earth, and for carbon-based or other life) have thus been created since the Big Bang in stars which were hot enough to fuse helium itself. All elements other than hydrogen and helium today account for only 2% of the mass of atomic matter in the universe. Helium-4, by contrast, comprises about 24% of the mass of the universe's ordinary matter—nearly all the ordinary matter that is not hydrogen.

=== Gas and plasma phases ===
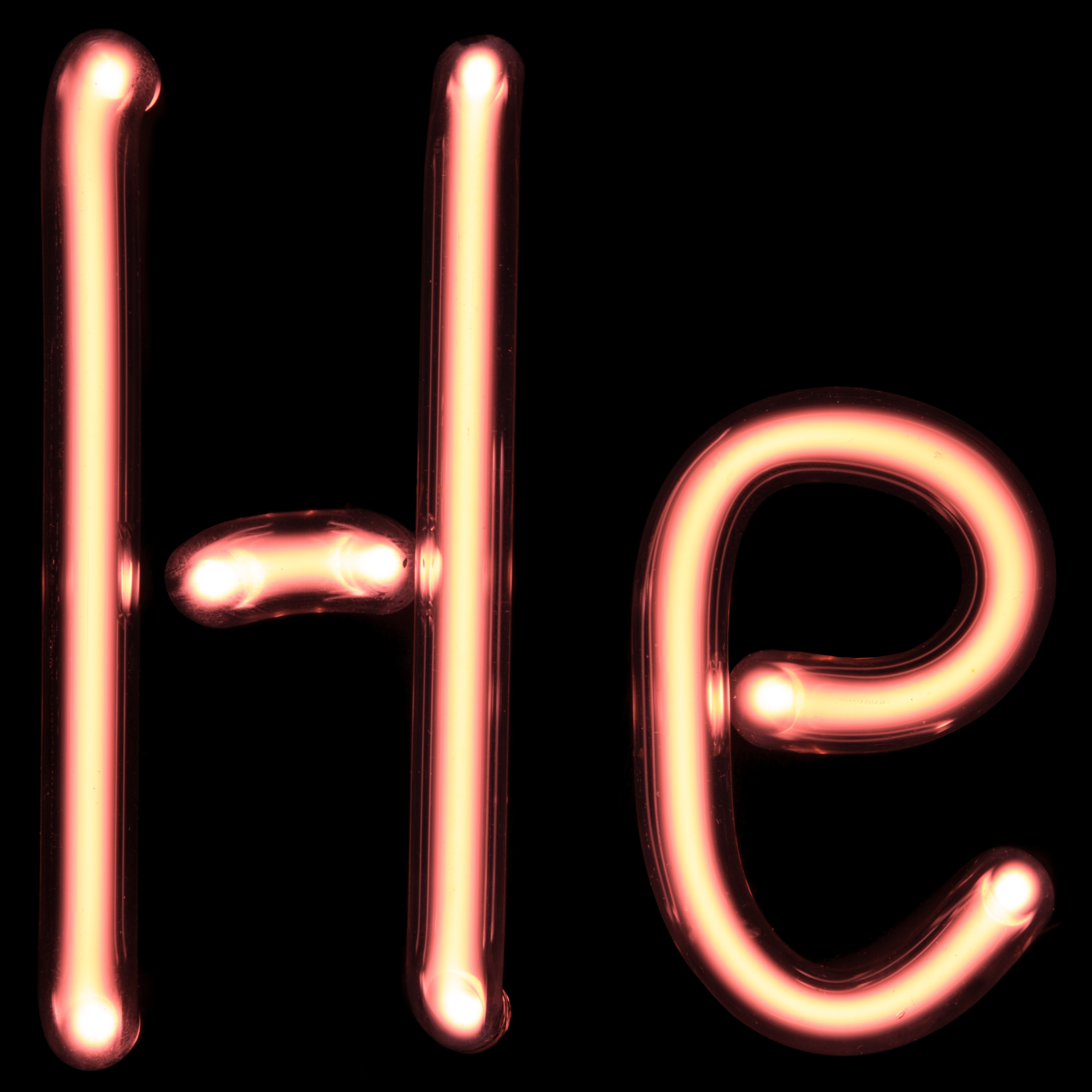
Helium discharge tube shaped into 'He', the element's symbol.

Helium is the second least reactive noble gas after neon, and thus the second least reactive of all elements. It is chemically inert and monatomic in all standard conditions. Because of helium's relatively low molar (atomic) mass, its thermal conductivity, specific heat, and sound speed in the gas phase are all greater than any other gas except hydrogen. For these reasons and the small size of helium monatomic molecules, helium diffuses through solids at a rate three times that of air and around 65% that of hydrogen.

Helium is the least water-soluble monatomic gas, and one of the least water-soluble of any gas (CF_{4}, SF_{6}, and C_{4}F_{8} have lower mole fraction solubilities: 0.3802, 0.4394, and 0.2372 x_{2}/10^{−5}, respectively, versus helium's 0.70797 x_{2}/10^{−5}), and helium's index of refraction is closer to unity than that of any other gas. Helium has a negative Joule–Thomson coefficient at normal ambient temperatures, meaning it heats up when allowed to freely expand. Only below its Joule–Thomson inversion temperature (of about 32 to 50 K (−241.2 to −223.2 °C; −402.1 to −369.7 °F) at one atm (0.10 MPa)) does it cool upon free expansion. Once precooled below this temperature, helium can be liquefied through expansion cooling.

Most extraterrestrial helium is plasma in stars, with properties quite different from those of atomic helium. In a plasma, helium's electrons are not bound to its nucleus, resulting in very high electrical conductivity, even when the gas is only partially ionized. The charged particles are highly influenced by magnetic and electric fields. For example, in the solar wind together with ionized hydrogen, the particles interact with the Earth's magnetosphere, giving rise to Birkeland currents and the aurora.

=== Liquid phase ===
Phase diagram of helium-4. (Atmospheric pressure is about 0.1 MPa (0.99 atm))

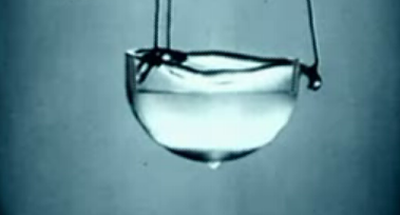
Liquefied helium. This helium is not only liquid, but has been cooled to the point of superfluidity. The drop of liquid at the bottom of the glass represents helium spontaneously escaping from the container over the side, to empty out of the container. The energy to drive this process is supplied by the potential energy of the falling helium.

Helium liquifies when cooled below 4.2 K (−268.95 °C; −452.11 °F) at atmospheric pressure. Unlike any other element, however, helium remains liquid down to a temperature of absolute zero. This is a direct effect of quantum mechanics: specifically, the zero point energy of the system is too high to allow freezing. Pressures above about 2.5 MPa (25 atm) are required to freeze it. There are two liquid phases: Helium I is a conventional liquid, and Helium II, which occurs at a lower temperature, is a superfluid.

==== Helium I ====
Below its boiling point of 4.22 K (−268.93 °C; −452.07 °F) and above the lambda point of 2.1768 K (−270.9732 °C; −455.7518 °F), the isotope helium-4 exists in a normal colorless liquid state, called helium I. Like other cryogenic liquids, helium I boils when it is heated and contracts when its temperature is lowered. Below the lambda point, however, helium does not boil, and it expands as the temperature is lowered further.

Helium I has a gas-like index of refraction of 1.026 which makes its surface so hard to see that floats of Styrofoam are often used to show where the surface is. This colorless liquid has a very low viscosity and a density of 0.145–0.125 g/mL (between about 0 and 4 K), which is only one-fourth the value expected from classical physics. Quantum mechanics is needed to explain this property and thus both states of liquid helium (helium I and helium II) are called quantum fluids, meaning they display atomic properties on a macroscopic scale. This may be an effect of its boiling point being so close to absolute zero, preventing random molecular motion (thermal energy) from masking the atomic properties.

==== Helium II ====
Liquid helium below its lambda point (called helium II) exhibits very unusual characteristics. Due to its high thermal conductivity, when it boils, it does not bubble but rather evaporates directly from its surface. Helium-3 also has a superfluid phase, but only at much lower temperatures; as a result, less is known about the properties of the isotope.

Unlike ordinary liquids, helium II will creep along surfaces in order to reach an equal level; after a short while, the levels in the two containers will equalize. The Rollin film also covers the interior of the larger container; if it were not sealed, the helium II would creep out and escape.

Helium II is a superfluid, a quantum mechanical state of matter with strange properties. For example, when it flows through capillaries as thin as 10 to 100 nm it has no measurable viscosity. However, when measurements were done between two moving discs, a viscosity comparable to that of gaseous helium was observed. Existing theory explains this using the two-fluid model for helium II. In this model, liquid helium below the lambda point is viewed as containing a proportion of helium atoms in a ground state, which are superfluid and flow with exactly zero viscosity, and a proportion of helium atoms in an excited state, which behave more like an ordinary fluid.

In the fountain effect, a chamber is constructed which is connected to a reservoir of helium II by a sintered disc through which superfluid helium leaks easily but through which non-superfluid helium cannot pass. If the interior of the container is heated, the superfluid helium changes to non-superfluid helium. In order to maintain the equilibrium fraction of superfluid helium, superfluid helium leaks through and increases the pressure, causing liquid to fountain out of the container.

The thermal conductivity of helium II is greater than that of any other known substance, a million times that of helium I and several hundred times that of copper. This is because heat conduction occurs by an exceptional quantum mechanism. Most materials that conduct heat well have a valence band of free electrons which serve to transfer the heat. Helium II has no such valence band but nevertheless conducts heat well. The flow of heat is governed by equations that are similar to the wave equation used to characterize sound propagation in air. When heat is introduced, it moves at 20 meters per second at 1.8 K through helium II as waves in a phenomenon known as second sound.

Helium II also exhibits a creeping effect. When a surface extends past the level of helium II, the helium II moves along the surface, against the force of gravity. Helium II will escape from a vessel that is not sealed by creeping along the sides until it reaches a warmer region where it evaporates. It moves in a 30 nm-thick film regardless of surface material. This film is called a Rollin film and is named after the man who first characterized this trait, Bernard V. Rollin. As a result of this creeping behavior and helium II's ability to leak rapidly through tiny openings, it is very difficult to confine. Unless the container is carefully constructed, the helium II will creep along the surfaces and through valves until it reaches somewhere warmer, where it will evaporate. Waves propagating across a Rollin film are governed by the same equation as gravity waves in shallow water, but rather than gravity, the restoring force is the van der Waals force. These waves are known as third sound.

=== Solid phases ===
Helium remains liquid down to absolute zero at atmospheric pressure, but it freezes at high pressure. Solid helium requires a temperature of 1–1.5 K (about −272 °C or −457 °F) at about 25 bar (2.5 MPa) of pressure. It is often hard to distinguish solid from liquid helium since the refractive index of the two phases are nearly the same. The solid has a sharp melting point and has a crystalline structure, but it is highly compressible; applying pressure in a laboratory can decrease its volume by more than 30%. With a bulk modulus of about 27 MPa it is ~100 times more compressible than water. Solid helium has a density of 0.214±0.006 g/cm^{3} at 1.15 K and 6.7 MPa (66 atm); the projected density at 0 K and 2.5 MPa (25 atm) is 0.187±0.009 g/cm^{3}. At higher temperatures, helium will solidify with sufficient pressure. At room temperature, this requires about 11,600 MPa (114,000 atm).

Helium-4 and helium-3 both form several crystalline solid phases, all requiring at least 25 bar. They both form an α phase, which has a hexagonal close-packed (hcp) crystal structure, a β phase, which is face-centered cubic (fcc), and a γ phase, which is body-centered cubic (bcc).

=== Isotopes ===
There are eight known isotopes of helium of which two, helium-3 and helium-4, are stable. In the Earth's atmosphere, one atom is ^{3}He for every million that are ^{4}He. Unlike most elements, helium's isotopic abundance varies greatly by origin, due to the different formation processes. The most common isotope, helium-4, is produced on Earth by alpha decay of heavier radioactive elements; the alpha particles that emerge are fully ionized helium-4 nuclei. Helium-4 is an unusually stable nucleus because its nucleons are arranged into complete shells. It was also formed in enormous quantities during Big Bang nucleosynthesis.

Helium-3 is present on Earth only in trace amounts. Most of it has been present since Earth's formation, though some falls to Earth trapped in cosmic dust. Trace amounts are also produced by the beta decay of tritium. Rocks from the Earth's crust have isotope ratios varying by as much as a factor of ten, and these ratios can be used to investigate the origin of rocks and the composition of the Earth's mantle. ^{3}He is much more abundant in stars as a product of nuclear fusion. Thus in the interstellar medium, the proportion of ^{3}He to ^{4}He is about 100 times higher than on Earth. Extraplanetary material, such as lunar and asteroid regolith, have trace amounts of helium-3 from being bombarded by the solar wind. The Moon's surface contains helium-3 at concentrations on the order of 10 ppb, much higher than the approximately 5 ppt found in the Earth's atmosphere. A number of people, starting with Gerald Kulcinski in 1986, have proposed to explore the Moon, mine lunar regolith, and use the helium-3 for fusion.

Liquid helium-4 can be cooled to about 1 K (−272.15 °C; −457.87 °F) using evaporative cooling in a 1-K pot. Similar cooling of helium-3, which has a lower boiling point, can achieve about 0.2 kelvin in a helium-3 refrigerator. Equal mixtures of liquid ^{3}He and ^{4}He below 0.8 K separate into two immiscible phases due to their dissimilarity (they follow different quantum statistics: helium-4 atoms are bosons while helium-3 atoms are fermions). Dilution refrigerators use this immiscibility to achieve temperatures of a few millikelvins.

It is possible to produce exotic helium isotopes, which rapidly decay into other substances. The shortest-lived heavy helium isotope is the unbound helium-10 with a half-life of 2.6(4)×10^{−22} s. Helium-6 decays by emitting a beta particle and has a half-life of 0.8 seconds. Helium-7 and helium-8 are created in certain nuclear reactions. Helium-6 and helium-8 are known to exhibit a nuclear halo.

=== Properties ===
Table of thermal and physical properties of helium gas at atmospheric pressure:

Temperature (K)	Density (kg/m^3)	Specific heat (kJ/kg °C)	Dynamic viscosity (kg/m s)	Kinematic viscosity (m^2/s)	Thermal conductivity (W/m °C)	Thermal diffusivity (m^2/s)	Prandtl number
100		5.193	9.63×10^{−6}	1.98×10^{−5}	0.073	2.89×10^{−5}	0.686
120	0.406	5.193	1.07×10^{−5}	2.64×10^{−5}	0.0819	3.88×10^{−5}	0.679
144	0.3379	5.193	1.26×10^{−5}	3.71×10^{−5}	0.0928	5.28×10^{−5}	0.7
200	0.2435	5.193	1.57×10^{−5}	6.44×10^{−5}	0.1177	9.29×10^{−5}	0.69
255	0.1906	5.193	1.82×10^{−5}	9.55×10^{−5}	0.1357	1.37×10^{−4}	0.7
366	0.1328	5.193	2.31×10^{−5}	1.74×10^{−4}	0.1691	2.45×10^{−4}	0.71
477	0.10204	5.193	2.75×10^{−5}	2.69×10^{−4}	0.197	3.72×10^{−4}	0.72
589	0.08282	5.193	3.11×10^{−5}	3.76×10^{−4}	0.225	5.22×10^{−4}	0.72
700	0.07032	5.193	3.48×10^{−5}	4.94×10^{−4}	0.251	6.66×10^{−4}	0.72
800	0.06023	5.193	3.82×10^{−5}	6.34×10^{−4}	0.275	8.77×10^{−4}	0.72
900	0.05451	5.193	4.14×10^{−5}	7.59×10^{−4}	0.33	1.14×10^{−3}	0.687
1000		5.193	4.46×10^{−5}	9.14×10^{−4}	0.354	1.40×10^{−3}	0.654

== Compounds ==
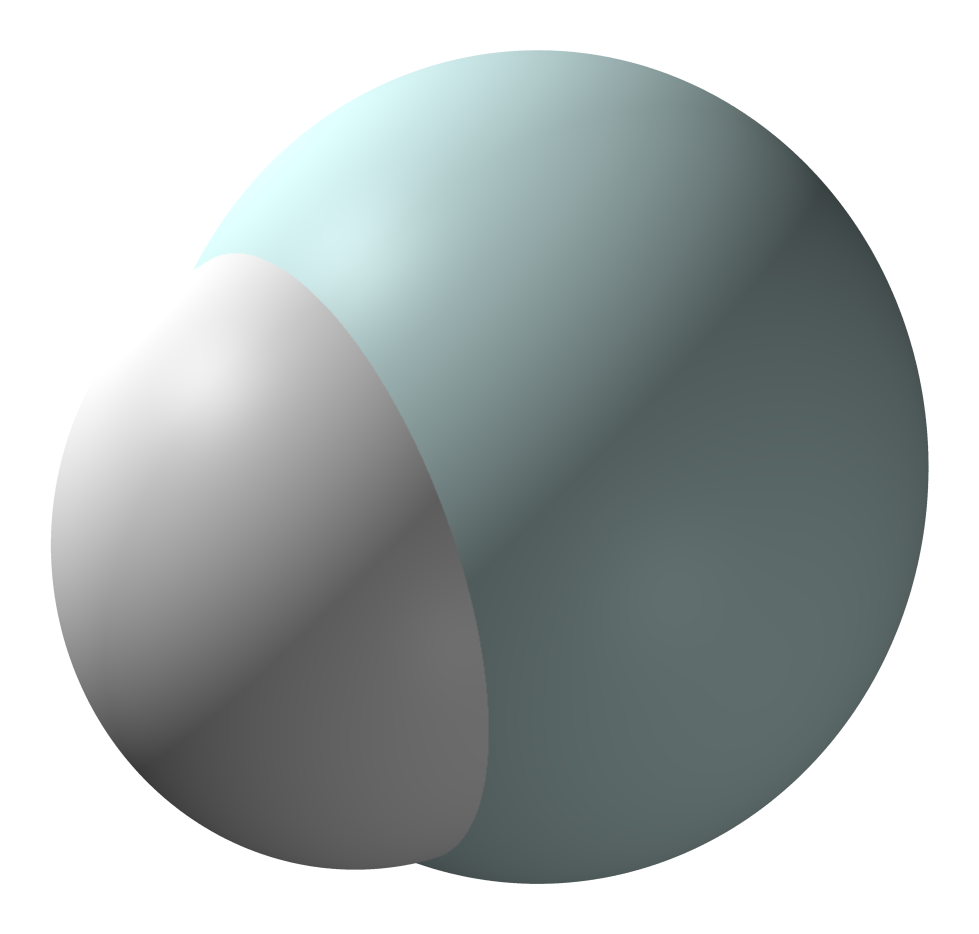
Structure of the helium hydride ion, HeH^{+}

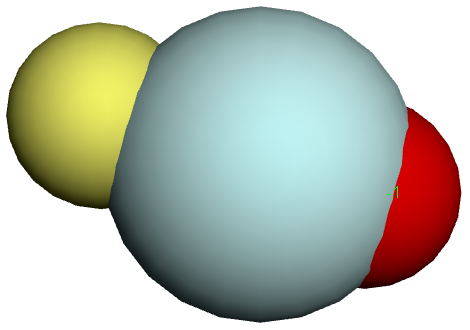
Structure of the suspected fluoroheliate anion, OHeF^{−}

Helium has a valence of zero and is chemically unreactive under all normal conditions. It is an electrical insulator unless ionized. As with the other noble gases, helium has metastable energy levels that allow it to remain ionized in an electrical discharge with a voltage below its ionization potential. Helium can form unstable compounds, known as excimers, with tungsten, iodine, fluorine, sulfur, and phosphorus when it is subjected to a glow discharge, to electron bombardment, or reduced to plasma by other means. The molecular compounds HeNe, HgHe_{10}, and WHe_{2}, and the molecular ions He^{+}_{2}, He^{2+}_{2}, HeH^{+}, and HeD^{+} have been created this way. HeH^{+} is also stable in its ground state but is extremely reactive—it is the strongest Brønsted acid known, and therefore can exist only in isolation, as it will protonate any molecule or counteranion it contacts. This technique has also produced the neutral molecule He_{2}, which has a large number of band systems, and HgHe, which is apparently held together only by polarization forces.

Van der Waals compounds of helium can also be formed with cryogenic helium gas and atoms of some other substance, such as LiHe and He_{2}.

Theoretically, other true compounds may be possible, such as helium fluorohydride (HHeF), which would be analogous to HArF, discovered in 2000. Calculations show that two new compounds containing a helium-oxygen bond could be stable. Two new molecular species, predicted using theory, CsFHeO and N(CH_{3})_{4}FHeO, are derivatives of a metastable FHeO^{−} anion first theorized in 2005 by a group from Taiwan.

Helium atoms have been inserted into the hollow carbon cage molecules (the fullerenes) by heating under high pressure. The endohedral fullerene molecules formed are stable at high temperatures. When chemical derivatives of these fullerenes are formed, the helium stays inside. If helium-3 is used, it can be readily observed by helium nuclear magnetic resonance spectroscopy. Many fullerenes containing helium-3 have been reported. Although the helium atoms are not attached by covalent or ionic bonds, these substances have distinct properties and a definite composition, like all stoichiometric chemical compounds.

Under high pressures helium can form compounds with various other elements. Helium-nitrogen clathrate (He(N_{2})_{11}) crystals have been grown at room temperature at pressures ca. 10 GPa in a diamond anvil cell. The insulating electride Na_{2}He has been shown to be thermodynamically stable at pressures above 113 GPa. It has a fluorite structure.

== Occurrence and production ==
Helium production

=== Natural abundance ===
Although it is rare on Earth, helium is the second most abundant element in the known Universe, constituting 23% of its baryonic mass. Only hydrogen is more abundant. The vast majority of helium was formed by Big Bang nucleosynthesis one to three minutes after the Big Bang. As a result, measurements of its abundance contribute to cosmological models. The first molecular bonds were formed when primordial helium atoms combined with protons to form helium hydride ions, HeH^{+}. In stars, helium is formed by the nuclear fusion of hydrogen in proton–proton chain reactions and the CNO cycle, part of stellar nucleosynthesis.

In the Earth's atmosphere, the concentration of helium by volume is only 5.2 parts per million. The concentration is low and fairly constant despite the continuous production of new helium because most helium in the Earth's atmosphere escapes into space by several processes. In the Earth's heterosphere, a part of the upper atmosphere, helium and hydrogen are the most abundant elements.

Most helium on Earth is a result of radioactive decay. Helium is found in large amounts in minerals of uranium and thorium, such as uraninite and its varieties cleveite and pitchblende, as well as carnotite and monazite (a group name; "monazite" usually refers to monazite-(Ce)), because they emit alpha particles (helium nuclei, He^{2+}) to which electrons immediately combine as soon as the particle is stopped by the rock. In this way an estimated 3000 metric tons of helium are generated per year throughout the lithosphere. In the Earth's crust, the concentration of helium is 8 parts per billion. In seawater, the concentration is only 4 parts per trillion. There are also small amounts in mineral springs, volcanic gas, and meteoric iron. Because helium is trapped in the subsurface under conditions that also trap natural gas, the greatest natural concentrations of helium on the planet are found in natural gas, from which most commercial helium is extracted. The concentration varies in a broad range from a few ppm to more than 7% in a small gas field in San Juan County, New Mexico.

As of 2021, the world's helium reserves were estimated at 31,000,000,000 cubic metres (1.1×10^{12} cu ft), with a third of that being in Qatar. In 2015 and 2016 additional probable reserves were announced to be under the Rocky Mountains in North America and in the East African Rift.

The Bureau of Land Management (BLM) has proposed an October 2024 plan for managing natural resources in western Colorado. The plan involves closing 543,000 acres to oil and gas leasing while keeping 692,300 acres open. Among the open areas, 165,700 acres have been identified as suitable for helium recovery. The United States possesses an estimated 8.7×10^{9} m^{3} (306,000,000,000 cu ft) of recoverable helium, sufficient to meet current consumption rates of 61,000,000 m^{3} (2,150,000,000 cu ft) per year for approximately 150 years.

=== Modern extraction and distribution ===
Extracting helium from air is not economical. For large-scale use, helium is extracted by fractional distillation from natural gas, which can contain as much as 7% helium. Since helium has a lower boiling point than any other element, low temperatures and high pressure are used to liquefy nearly all the other gases (mostly nitrogen and methane). The resulting crude helium gas is purified by successive exposures to lowering temperatures, in which almost all of the remaining nitrogen and other gases are precipitated out of the gaseous mixture. Activated charcoal is used as a final purification step, usually resulting in 99.995% pure Grade-A helium. The principal impurity in Grade-A helium is neon. In a final production step, most of the helium that is produced is liquefied via a cryogenic process. This is necessary for applications requiring liquid helium and also allows helium suppliers to reduce the cost of long-distance transportation, as the largest liquid helium containers have more than five times the capacity of the largest gaseous helium tube trailers.

In 2008, approximately 169 million standard cubic meters (SCM) (6.0 × 10^{9} cubic feet) of helium were extracted from natural gas or withdrawn from helium reserves, with approximately 78% from the United States, 10% from Algeria, and most of the remainder from Russia, Poland, and Qatar. By 2013, increases in helium production in Qatar (under the company Qatargas managed by Air Liquide) had increased Qatar's fraction of world helium production to 25%, making it the second largest exporter after the United States. In 2024, the United States surpassed Qatar as the world's largest producer of the gas, having extracted 68 million SCM of helium that year compared to Qatar's 64 million SCM. An estimated 54 billion cubic feet (1.5×10^{9} m^{3}) deposit of helium was found in Tanzania in 2016, and a large-scale helium plant was opened in Ningxia, China in 2020.

In the United States, most helium is extracted from the natural gas of the Hugoton and nearby gas fields in Kansas, Oklahoma, and the Panhandle Field in Texas. Much of this gas was once sent by pipeline to the National Helium Reserve, but since 2005, this reserve has been depleted and sold off, and it was expected to be largely depleted by 2021 under the October 2013 Responsible Helium Administration and Stewardship Act (H.R. 527). Despite efforts to sell the remaining reserve in 2021, the remnants of the National Helium Reserve were auctioned off by the Bureau of Land Management over the course of 3 years. It was finally sold to Messer Group on June 27, 2024. The helium fields of the western United States are emerging as an alternate source of helium supply, particularly those of the "Four Corners" region (the states of Arizona, Colorado, New Mexico and Utah).

Diffusion of crude natural gas through special semipermeable membranes and other barriers is another method to recover and purify helium. In 1996, the U.S. had proven helium reserves in such gas well complexes of about 147 billion standard cubic feet (4.2 billion SCM). At rates of use at that time (72 million SCM per year in the U.S.; see pie chart below) this would have been enough helium for about 58 years of U.S. use, and less than this (perhaps 80% of the time) at world use rates, although factors in saving and processing impact effective reserve numbers.

Helium is commercially available in either liquid or gaseous form. As a liquid, it can be supplied in small insulated containers called dewars which hold as much as one cubic metre (1,000 L) of helium, or in large ISO containers, which have nominal capacities as large as 42 m^{3} (around 11,000 U.S. gallons). In gaseous form, small quantities of helium are supplied in high-pressure cylinders holding as much as 8 m^{3} (approximately .282 standard cubic feet), while large quantities of high-pressure gas are supplied in tube trailers, which have capacities of as much as 4,860 m^{3} (approx. 172,000 standard cubic feet).

=== Conservation advocates ===
According to helium conservationists like Nobel laureate physicist Robert Coleman Richardson, writing in 2010, the free market price of helium has contributed to "wasteful" usage (e.g. for helium balloons). Prices in the 2000s had been lowered by the decision of the U.S. Congress to sell off the country's large helium stockpile by 2015. Richardson posited that the price of helium needed to be multiplied by 20 to eliminate excessive wasting of the gas. In a 2012 paper by Nuttall and colleagues titled "Stop squandering helium", they proposed to create an International Helium Agency that would build a sustainable helium market.

== Applications ==
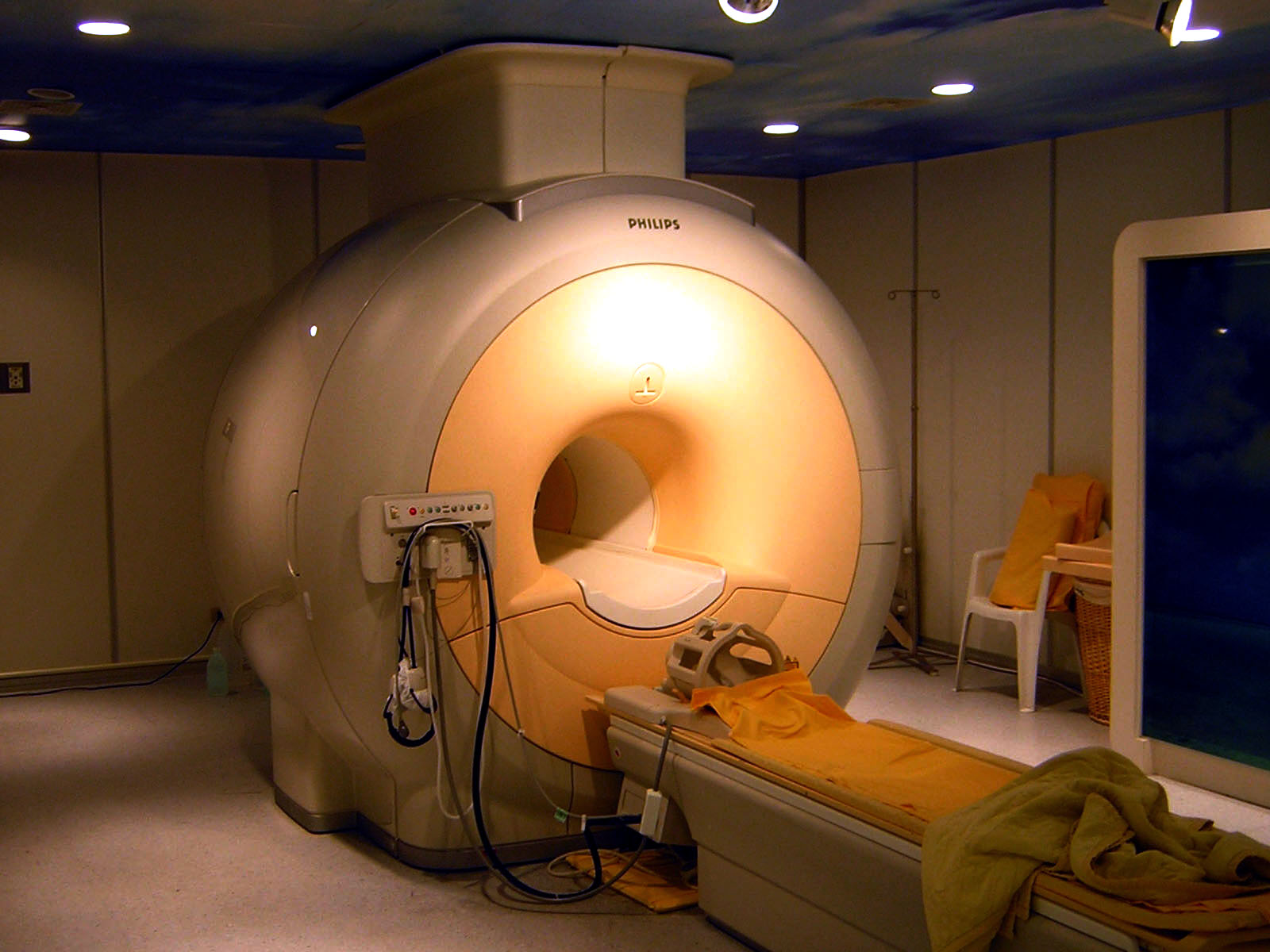
The largest single use of liquid helium is to cool the superconducting magnets in modern MRI scanners.

Estimated 2014 U.S. fractional helium use by category. Total use is 34 million cubic meters (1.2 × 10^{9} cubic feet).
1. Cryogenics (32%)
2. Pressurizing and purging (18%)
3. Welding (13%)
4. Controlled atmospheres (18%)
5. Leak detection (4%)
6. Breathing mixtures (2%)
7. Other (13%)

While balloons are perhaps the best-known use of helium, they are a minor part of all helium use. Helium is used for many purposes that require some of its unique properties, such as its low boiling point, low density, low solubility, high thermal conductivity, or inertness. Of the 2014 world helium total production of about 32 million kg (180 million standard cubic meters) of helium per year, the largest use (about 32% of the total in 2014) is in cryogenic applications, most of which involves cooling the superconducting magnets in medical MRI scanners and NMR spectrometers. Other major uses were pressurizing and purging systems, welding, maintenance of controlled atmospheres, and leak detection. Other uses by category were relatively minor fractions.

=== Controlled atmospheres ===
Helium is used as a protective gas in growing silicon and germanium crystals, in titanium and zirconium production, and in gas chromatography, because it is inert. Because of its inertness, thermally and calorically perfect nature, high speed of sound, and high value of the heat capacity ratio, it is also useful in supersonic wind tunnels and impulse facilities.

=== Gas tungsten arc welding ===
Helium is used as a shielding gas in arc welding processes on materials that are contaminated and weakened by air or nitrogen at welding temperatures. A number of inert shielding gases are used in gas tungsten arc welding, but helium is used instead of cheaper argon especially for welding materials that have higher heat conductivity, like aluminium or copper.

=== Minor uses ===
==== Industrial leak detection ====
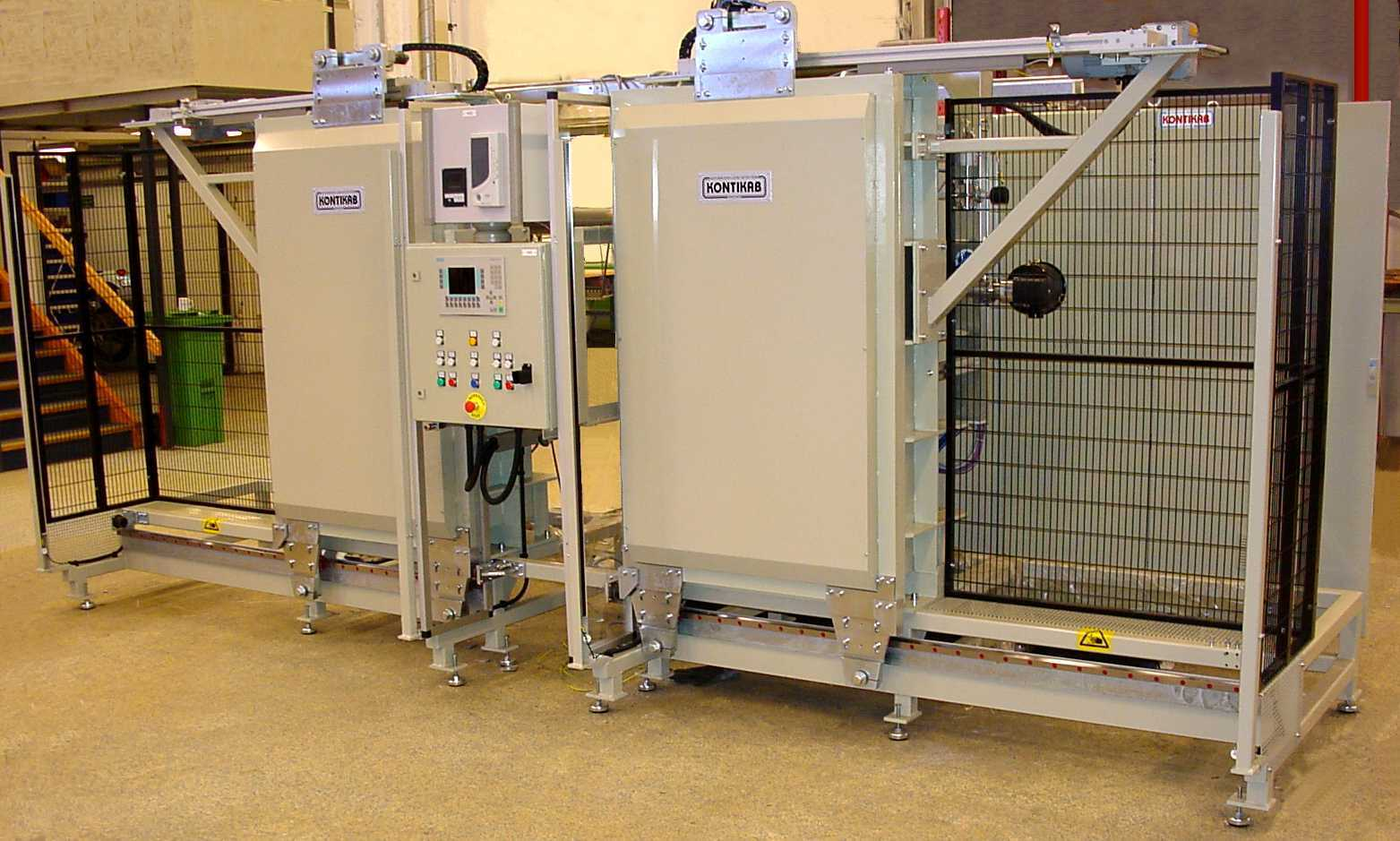
A dual chamber helium leak detection machine

One industrial application for helium is leak detection. Because helium diffuses through solids three times faster than air, it is used as a tracer gas to detect leaks in high-vacuum equipment (such as cryogenic tanks) and high-pressure containers. The tested object is placed in a chamber, which is then evacuated and filled with helium. The helium that escapes through the leaks is detected by a sensitive device (helium mass spectrometer), even at the leak rates as small as 10^{−9} mbar·L/s (10^{−10} Pa·m^{3}/s). The measurement procedure is normally automatic and is called helium integral test. A simpler procedure is to fill the tested object with helium and to manually search for leaks with a hand-held device.

Helium leaks through cracks should not be confused with gas permeation through a bulk material. While helium has documented permeation constants (thus a calculable permeation rate) through glasses, ceramics, and synthetic materials, inert gases such as helium will not permeate most bulk metals.

==== Flight ====
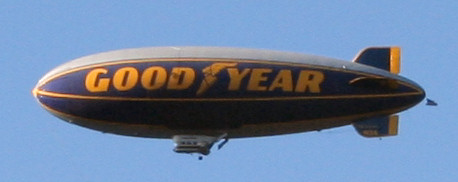
Because of its low density and incombustibility, helium is the gas of choice to fill airships such as the Goodyear Blimp.

Because it is lighter than air, airships and balloons are inflated with helium for lift. While hydrogen gas is more buoyant and escapes permeating through a membrane at a lower rate, helium has the advantage of being non-flammable, and indeed fire-retardant. Another minor use is in rocketry, where helium is used as an ullage medium to backfill rocket propellant tanks in flight and to condense hydrogen and oxygen to make rocket fuel. It is also used to purge fuel and oxidizer from ground support equipment prior to launch and to pre-cool liquid hydrogen in space vehicles. For example, the Saturn V rocket used in the Apollo program needed about 370,000 cubic metres (13 million cubic feet) of helium to launch.

==== Minor commercial and recreational uses ====
Helium as a breathing gas has no narcotic properties, so helium mixtures such as trimix, heliox and heliair are used for deep diving to reduce the effects of narcosis, which worsen with increasing depth. As pressure increases with depth, the density of the breathing gas also increases, and the low molecular weight of helium is found to considerably reduce the effort of breathing by lowering the density of the mixture. This reduces the Reynolds number of flow, leading to a reduction of turbulent flow and an increase in laminar flow, which requires less breathing. At depths below 150 metres (490 ft) divers breathing helium-oxygen mixtures begin to experience tremors and a decrease in psychomotor function, symptoms of high-pressure nervous syndrome. This effect may be countered to some extent by adding an amount of narcotic gas such as hydrogen or nitrogen to a helium–oxygen mixture.

Helium–neon lasers, a type of low-powered gas laser producing a red beam, had various practical applications which included barcode readers and laser pointers, before they were almost universally replaced by cheaper diode lasers.

For its inertness and high thermal conductivity, neutron transparency, and because it does not form radioactive isotopes under reactor conditions, helium is used as a heat-transfer medium in some gas-cooled nuclear reactors.

Helium, mixed with a heavier gas such as xenon, is useful for thermoacoustic refrigeration due to the resulting high heat capacity ratio and low Prandtl number. The inertness of helium has environmental advantages over conventional refrigeration systems which contribute to ozone depletion or global warming.

Helium is also used in some hard disk drives.

==== Scientific uses ====
The use of helium reduces the distorting effects of temperature variations in the space between lenses in some telescopes due to its extremely low index of refraction. This method is especially used in solar telescopes where a vacuum tight telescope tube would be too heavy.

Helium is a commonly used carrier gas for gas chromatography.

The age of rocks and minerals that contain uranium and thorium can be estimated by measuring the level of helium with a process known as helium dating.

Helium at low temperatures is used in cryogenics and in certain cryogenic applications. As examples of applications, liquid helium is used to cool certain metals to the extremely low temperatures required for superconductivity, such as in superconducting magnets for magnetic resonance imaging. The Large Hadron Collider at CERN uses 96 metric tons of liquid helium to maintain the temperature at 1.9 K (−271.25 °C; −456.25 °F).

==== Medical uses ====
Helium was approved for medical use in the United States in April 2020 for humans and animals.

== Inhalation and safety ==
=== Effects ===
Neutral helium at standard conditions is non-toxic, plays no biological role and is found in trace amounts in human blood.

Effect of helium on a human voice
The effect of helium on a human voice

The speed of sound in helium is nearly three times the speed of sound in air. Because the natural resonance frequency of a gas-filled cavity is proportional to the speed of sound in the gas, when helium is inhaled, a corresponding increase occurs in the resonant frequencies of the vocal tract, which is the amplifier of vocal sound. This increase in the resonant frequency of the amplifier (the vocal tract) gives increased amplification to the high-frequency components of the sound wave produced by the direct vibration of the vocal folds, compared to the case when the voice box is filled with air. When a person speaks after inhaling helium gas, the muscles that control the voice box still move in the same way as when the voice box is filled with air; therefore the fundamental frequency (sometimes called pitch) produced by direct vibration of the vocal folds does not change. However, the high-frequency-preferred amplification causes a change in timbre of the amplified sound, resulting in a reedy, duck-like vocal quality. The opposite effect, lowering resonant frequencies, can be obtained by inhaling a dense gas such as sulfur hexafluoride or xenon.

=== Hazards ===
Helium
Hazards
- GHS labelling
Pictograms	(GHS04: Compressed Gas)
Signal word	Warning
Hazard statements	H280
Precautionary statements	P410+P403
NFPA 704 (fire diamond)	1 0 0

Inhaling helium can be dangerous if done to excess, since helium is a simple asphyxiant and so displaces oxygen needed for normal respiration. Fatalities have been recorded, including a youth who suffocated in Vancouver in 2003 and two adults who suffocated in South Florida in 2006. In 1998, an Australian girl from Victoria fell unconscious and temporarily turned blue after inhaling the entire contents of a party balloon. Inhaling helium directly from pressurized cylinders or even balloon filling valves is extremely dangerous, as high flow rate and pressure can result in barotrauma, fatally rupturing lung tissue.

Death caused by helium is rare. The first media-recorded case was that of a 15-year-old girl from Texas who died in 1998 from helium inhalation at a friend's party; the exact type of helium death is unidentified.

In the United States, only two fatalities were reported between 2000 and 2004, including a man who died in North Carolina of barotrauma in 2002. A youth asphyxiated in Vancouver during 2003, and a 27-year-old man in Australia had an embolism after breathing from a cylinder in 2000. Since then, two adults asphyxiated in South Florida in 2006, and there were cases in 2009 and 2010, one of whom was a Californian youth who was found with a bag over his head, attached to a helium tank, and another teenager in Northern Ireland died of asphyxiation. At Eagle Point, Oregon a teenage girl died in 2012 from barotrauma at a party. A girl from Michigan died from hypoxia later in the year.

On February 4, 2015, it was revealed that, during the recording of their main TV show on January 28, a 12-year-old member (name withheld) of Japanese all-girl singing group 3B Junior suffered from air embolism, losing consciousness and falling into a coma as a result of air bubbles blocking the flow of blood to the brain after inhaling huge quantities of helium as part of a game. The incident was not made public until a week later. The staff of TV Asahi held an emergency press conference to communicate that the member had been taken to the hospital and is showing signs of rehabilitation such as moving eyes and limbs, but her consciousness has not yet been sufficiently recovered. Police have launched an investigation due to a neglect of safety measures.

The safety issues for cryogenic helium are similar to those of liquid nitrogen; its extremely low temperatures can result in cold burns, and the liquid-to-gas expansion ratio can cause explosions if no pressure-relief devices are installed. Containers of helium gas at 5 to 10 K should be handled as if they contain liquid helium due to the rapid and significant thermal expansion that occurs when helium gas at less than 10 K is warmed to room temperature.

At high pressures (more than about two MPa (20 atm)), a mixture of helium and oxygen (heliox) can lead to high-pressure nervous syndrome, a sort of reverse-anesthetic effect; adding a small amount of nitrogen to the mixture can alleviate the problem.

== See also ==
- Abiogenic petroleum origin
- Helium-3 propulsion
- Leidenfrost effect
- Superfluid
- Tracer-gas leak testing method
- Hamilton Cady

== Bibliography ==
- Bureau of Mines (1967). Minerals yearbook mineral fuels Year 1965. Vol. II. U. S. Government Printing Office.
- Committee on the Impact of Selling the Federal Helium Reserve; Commission on Physical Sciences, Mathematics, and Applications; Commission on Engineering and Technical Systems; National Research Council (2000). The Impact of Selling the Federal Helium Reserve. The National Academies Press. ISBN 978-0-309-07038-6.
- Emsley, John (1998). The Elements (3rd ed.). New York: Oxford University Press. ISBN 978-0-19-855818-7.
- Vercheval, J. (2003). "The thermosphere: a part of the heterosphere". Belgian Institute for Space Aeronomy. Archived from the original on 2005-01-01.
