= Stockholms Lyceum =

Defunct private school in Sweden

Coordinates: 59°20′07″N 18°04′05″E

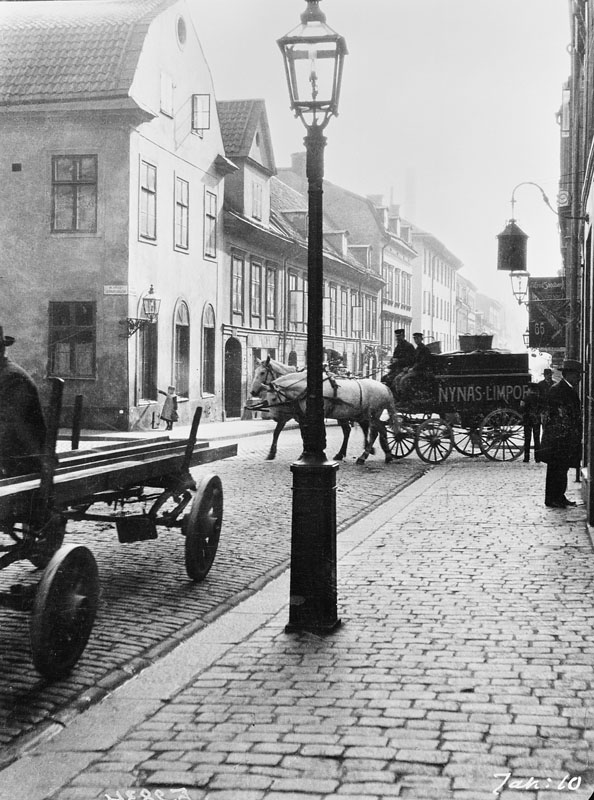
Stockholms Lyceum; the school occupied the large corner house, Regeringsgatan 54

Stockholms lyceum was a private secondary school (högre allmänt läroverk) in Stockholm, Sweden, functioning from 1839 until 1875.

The Lyceum was opened in 1839 by Claes Olof Ramström. He transferred the school in 1851 to Dr Carl Johan Bohman and Dr Otto von Feilitzen, who ran the school until 1875, when it was merged with the Stockholms ateneum. During the period of joint rectorship of the latter two, the school had 1,426 pupils, of whom 265 continued to university and another 191 to the Karlberg War Academy.

Alumni of the school include the writer August Strindberg (1849–1912), the poet Carl Snoilsky (1841–1903), the physician and writer Axel Munthe (1857–1949), the industrialist Oscar Lamm (1848–1930), and the palaeozoologist Gerhard Holm (1853–1926).

In his autobiographical novel, The Son of a Servant (chapter 5), Strindberg contrasts the private Lyceum to the "terror regime" of the contemporary Swedish public schools. In the Lyceum corporal punishment was abolished and the pupils were treated as "thinking beings", were allowed to discuss issues with, and even contradict, the teachers. He notes that many of the boys came from the aristocracy (another occasion for the author to point out the perceived inferiority experienced by his alter ego Johan), but that the spirit of the school and the attitude of its principal was liberal and democratic.
