= Abraham Langlet =

Swedish chemist (1868–1936)

Nils Abraham Langlet (9 July 1868 – 30 March 1936; known by his second given name) was a Swedish chemist.

== Biography ==
Langlet was born in Södertälje, Sweden. He was the son of architect Emil Victor Langlet (1824–1898) and his wife, author Clara Mathilda Ulrika Clementine Söderén (1832–1904). His brothers included author Valdemar Langlet (1872–1960).

From 1886 to 1896, he studied chemistry under Per Teodor Cleve (1840–1905) at Uppsala University, where he became a philosophy graduate in 1888, Philosophy Licentiate in 1893 and obtained a doctorate in 1896 and was made docent in the same year. In 1899, he became lecturer in Chemistry and Chemical Technology at the Chalmers University of Technology in Gothenburg, where he received a professorship in the same field in 1911. From 1926, when his professorship was divided, he was professor of Organic Chemistry.

In 1895, Langlet had made plans to reinvestigate the gas often present in samples of the uranium-bearing mineral cleveite. Although the American chemist William Francis Hillebrand had identified the gas as nitrogen in 1890, Langlet had been prompted by Cleve's suggestion that the gas might instead be argon, which had just been discovered by William Ramsay and John William Strutt, 3rd Baron Rayleigh. In the paper he wrote on his investigation, Langlet stated "Obstructed by other work, however, I had to postpone this investigation for a couple of weeks and had just begun it when the news reached Prof. Cleve that helium had been found [by Ramsay] in cleveite.... I continued the investigation I had begun in the hope of obtaining a product that differed from Ramsay's at least to some extent through possible differences in starting material and method of preparation." Although Langlet cannot be credited as an independent discoverer of the element helium, he was the first to correctly measure its atomic weight. He died in Gothenburg, Sweden.
