= 2012 in science =

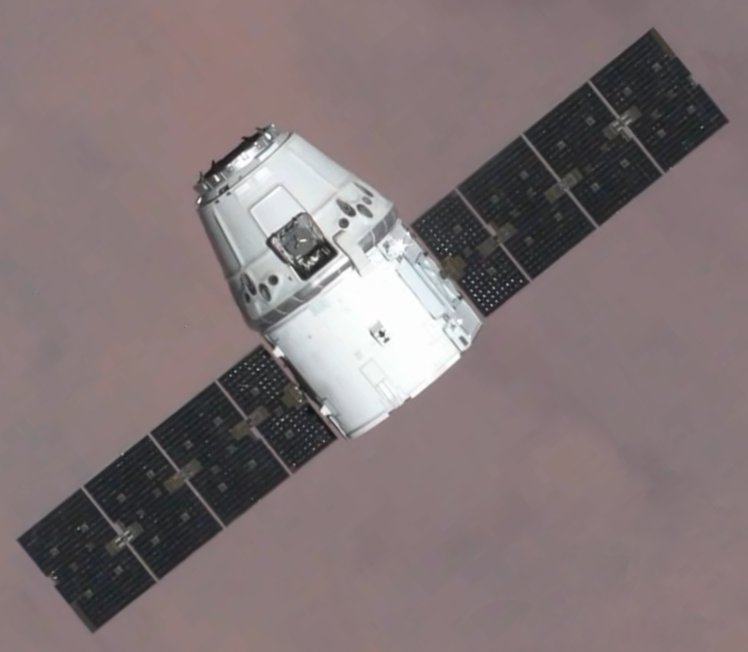
25 May 2012: SpaceX's Dragon spacecraft (pictured) becomes the first commercial spacecraft to rendezvous with the International Space Station.

The year 2012 involved many significant scientific events and discoveries, including the first orbital rendezvous by a commercial spacecraft, the discovery of a particle highly similar to the long-sought Higgs boson, and the near-eradication of guinea worm disease. A total of 72 successful orbital spaceflights occurred in 2012, and the year also saw numerous developments in fields such as robotics, 3D printing, stem cell research and genetics. Over 540,000 technological patent applications were made in the United States alone in 2012.

2012 was declared the International Year of Sustainable Energy for All by the United Nations. 2012 also marked Alan Turing Year, a celebration of the life and work of the English mathematician, logician, cryptanalyst and computer scientist Alan Turing.

== Events, discoveries and inventions ==
=== April ===
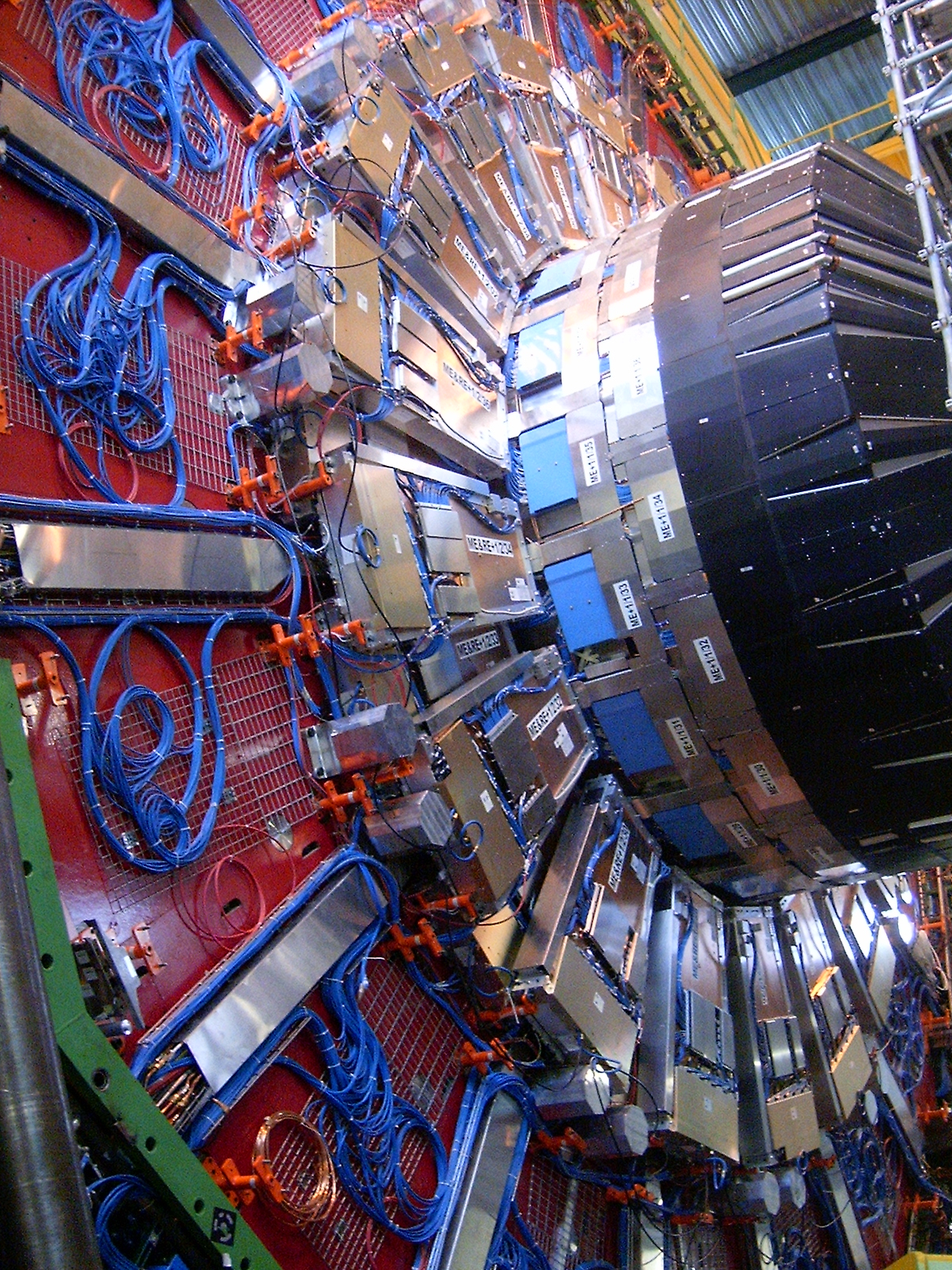
5 April 2012: the Large Hadron Collider completes a landmark energy upgrade.

- 2 April – The British Army announces the development of a conductive smart fabric for infantry uniforms. The fabric, which should enter widespread service by 2015, will eliminate the need for heavy, vulnerable power cables, making soldiers' electronics safer, cheaper and more durable.
- 4 April
  - A new, detailed record of past climate change has shown compelling evidence that the last ice age was ended by a rise in temperature driven by an increase in atmospheric carbon dioxide. The key result from the new study is that it shows the carbon dioxide rise during this major transition ran slightly ahead of increases in global temperature.
  - Austrian and Japanese researchers unveil solar cells that are thinner than a thread of spider silk, and flexible enough to be wrapped around a single human hair.
  - American researchers begin a new project, funded by the National Science Foundation, to develop printable robots that can be designed and made to order by the average person in less than 24 hours. The project, which is hoped to come to fruition by 2020, could allow any individual to cheaply build automated tools for any task in their own home.
- 5 April
  - Dutch and American researchers report that they have created a working quantum computer out of diamond, using the diamond's natural impurities as superimposed qubits to perform calculations.
  - Google unveils Project Glass, which aims to develop augmented reality glasses capable of layering information such as email, real-time traffic updates and video calls over a user's field of vision.
  - The Large Hadron Collider re-enters operation after an energy upgrade. It now has a total collision energy of 8 trillion electronvolts, a major increase over its pre-upgrade energy of 7 TeV.
- 6 April – An international team of researchers reports that a new, drug-resistant strain of malaria has emerged on the Thai–Cambodian border, potentially threatening global efforts to contain the disease.
- 8 April – American scientists reveal that transparent graphene sheets can be used to encapsulate liquids for study by electron microscopes. The discovery will greatly ease the accurate imaging of liquids at micro- and nanoscales.
- 10 April – The Wellcome Trust, one of the world's largest private funders of scientific research, states that it is launching a new online journal to promote the free sharing of scientific papers. The new journal, titled eLife, is part of a widespread push for open access to scientific research, and will compel researchers to make their work freely available online.
- 12 April
  - A team of researchers from France's Laboratoire Univers et Théorie releases the first ever computer model simulation of the structure of the entire observable universe, from the Big Bang to the present day. The simulation has made it possible to follow the evolution of 550 billion individual particles.
  - A report reveals that the United States invested more in renewable energy technology in 2011 than any other nation, totalling US$48 billion. China was the second-largest investor, spending US$45.5 billion on renewables. Worldwide, the combined investment in renewables reached an all-time high, at US$236 billion. A later report published by the United Nations amends these figures, stating that China invested $52 billion in renewable energy in 2011, while the US spent $51 billion.
  - German physicists develop the world's first universal quantum computing network, linking two laboratories using entangled rubidium atoms as network nodes.
  - An international team of researchers has used new, massively parallel DNA sequencing technology to fast-track the discovery of a breast cancer risk gene, XRCC2.
  - DARPA, the US military's advanced research agency, offers a US$2 million prize to any team who can independently develop a rescue robot capable of multiple tasks, including climbing ladders, clearing obstacles, using power tools and driving cars.
  - After studying 40 years of medical records, Swedish scientists state that those with Huntington's disease are around 50% less likely to develop cancer than those without the disease. Further study may reveal the genetic mechanism behind this resistance, allowing new cancer treatments to be developed.
  - The United Kingdom reports that it is considering the installation of undersea power cables to allow its National Grid to draw clean energy from Iceland's volcanoes.
  - Scientists report that complexity analysis studies of the Labeled Release experiments of the 1976 Viking mission to Mars may suggest the detection of "extant microbial life on Mars."

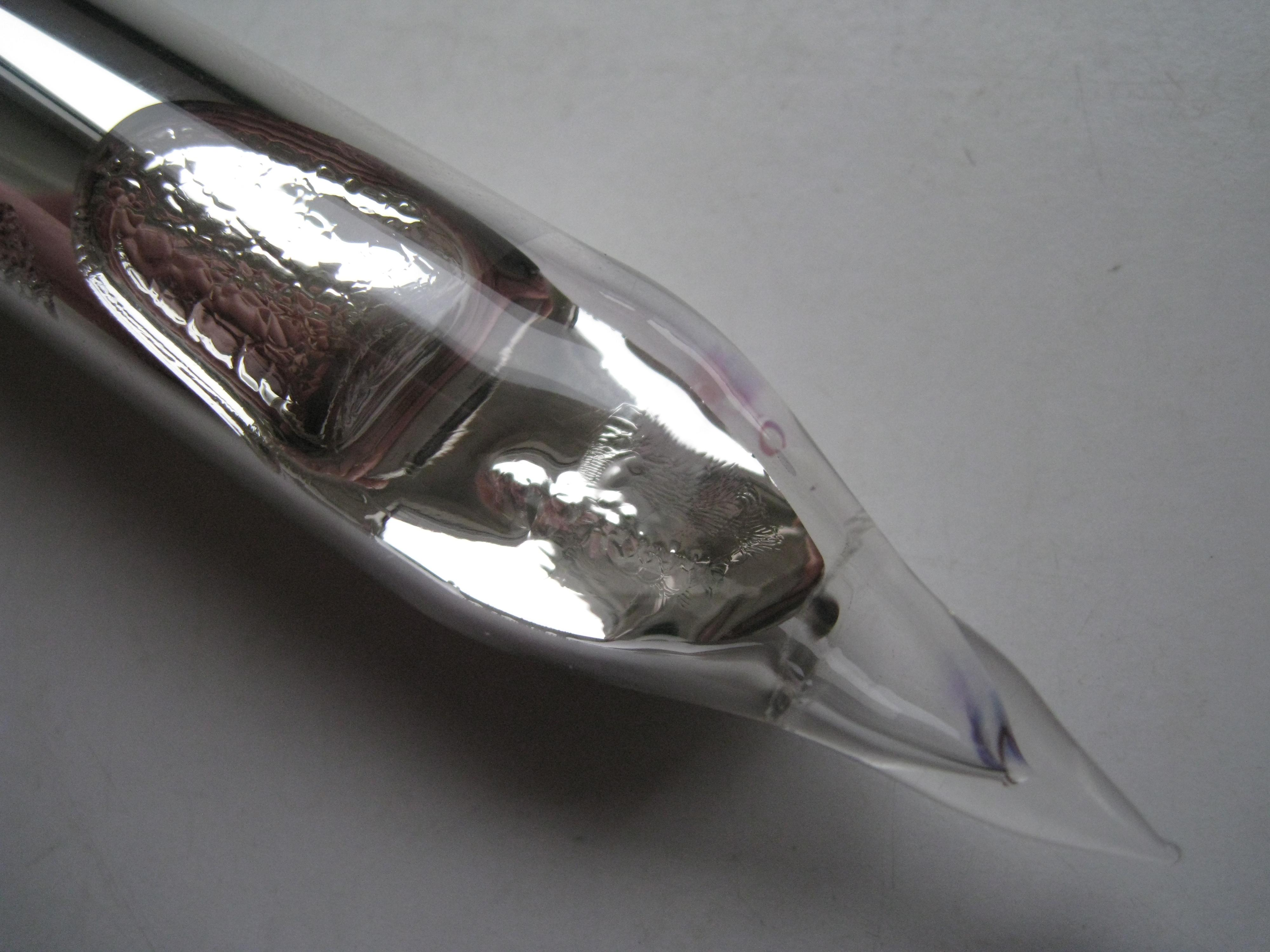
12 April 2012: German scientists create the world's first quantum computing network using entangled rubidium atoms (rubidium sample shown).

- 13 April
  - North Korea's Unha-3 orbital rocket disintegrates in mid-flight over the Yellow Sea, destroying its payload, the Kwangmyŏngsŏng-3 satellite. Analysts fear that the failed launch may raise the likelihood of North Korea conducting another nuclear weapons test.
  - German scientists develop a fiber-based "earthquake-proof" wallpaper capable of reinforcing masonry and delaying building collapses during violent quakes. The invention could save lives by giving people more time to flee from collapsing buildings.
  - The Pentagon places an order for advanced dual-focus contact lenses, designed to give soldiers greater visual awareness, in tandem with a new HUD system. The technology may enter the civilian market by 2014.
  - Dutch scientists report that they have found evidence of the existence of the Majorana fermion, a particle that is its own antiparticle. The existence of the Majorana was first theorized by the Italian scientist Ettore Majorana in the 1930s.
  - Researchers at UCLA announce that they have genetically engineered stem cells to seek out and kill HIV in mice.
- 15 April – Researchers claim that new satellite imagery shows an increase in the mass of some glaciers in Asia's Karakoram mountain range. This data contrasts with the wider global trend of glacial melting.
- 16 April – A new treatment for prostate cancer can rid the disease from nine in ten men without debilitating side effects, a study has found.
- 17 April – It is revealed that the Chinese and American militaries have been conducting informal war games together to help prevent military escalation in the event of a future cyber war.
- 18 April – Researchers at the American National Institutes of Health demonstrate a nanotechnology-based drug treatment which can successfully alleviate some symptoms of cerebral palsy (CP). The drug, which was tested in rabbits, caused a dramatic improvement of the movement disorders and brain inflammation that are characteristic of many cases of CP.

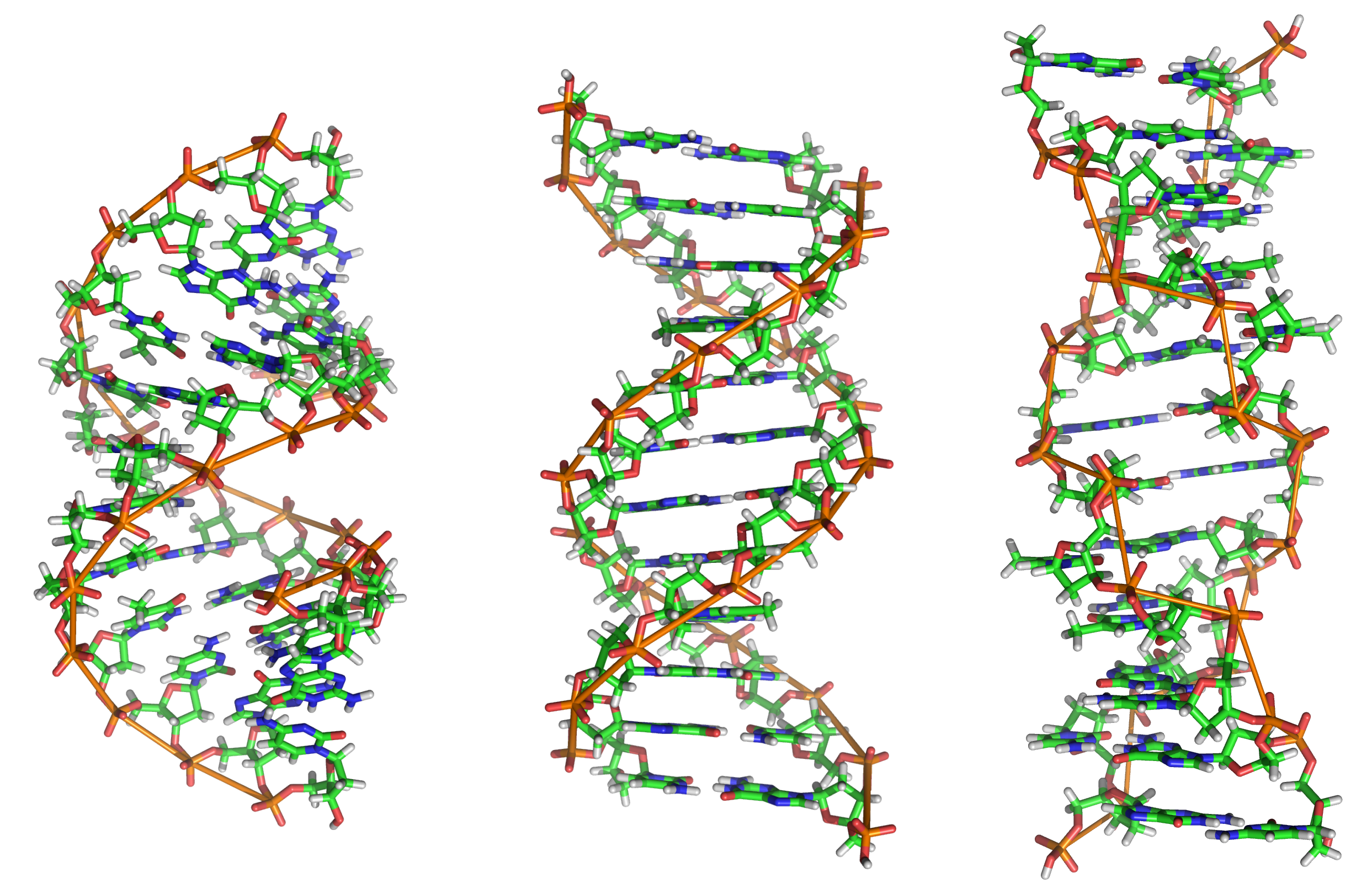
19 April 2012: international researchers develop synthetic DNA compounds.

- 19 April
  - A landmark study by British and Canadian scientists reveals that breast cancer can be subdivided into ten distinct types, with its aggressiveness determined by certain genes. The new data may make breast cancer diagnoses much more precise, and allow cancer treatments to be more effectively tailored to each patient.
  - Led by British scientists, a consortium including American, Belgian and Danish scientists successfully develop synthetic DNA compounds, dubbed "XNA", which demonstrate evolution when faced with selective pressure.
  - British researchers identify key genes that "switch off" as the human body ages. These genes may be targeted by future anti-aging therapies.
- 20 April
  - Scientists say the notoriously dry continent of Africa is sitting on a vast reservoir of groundwater.
  - A NASA-backed group of universities begins testing a GPS-derived earthquake warning system. The system, which uses satellite data to track seismic activity in real-time, may allow accurate earthquake and tsunami warnings to be issued up to ten times faster than is currently possible.
  - After three years of development, IBM reveals a new, ultra-lightweight lithium-air battery, offering greater energy density than any current lithium-ion battery. The new battery may permit the production of electric vehicles with far greater range and battery life than current models.
- 21 April – Scientists at Chicago's Northwestern University successfully trial a brain-computer interface capable of restoring naturalistic muscle movements in paralyzed rhesus monkeys. It is hoped the invention will eventually be approved to treat paralytic or brain-damaged humans.
- 22 April – Intel Corporation releases its new Ivy Bridge microprocessors – the world's first commercial 22 nanometer microchips, featuring increased processing power and energy efficiency.
- 24 April – Planetary Resources, a startup company backed by Google billionaires Larry Page and Eric Schmidt and film director James Cameron, announces plans to develop technology to survey and mine asteroids for minerals by 2020. The company plans to launch the first element of its project, a network of orbital surveying telescopes, by 2014.
- 26 April
  - Australian scientists develop a multi-layered, silica-based hydrophobic coating with greater durability than previous such coatings. The invention may be used to make self-cleaning fabrics and antibacterial medical equipment.
  - Researchers develop a crystalline quantum computer, composed of just 300 atoms, that theoretically is so powerful that it would take a conventional computer the size of the known universe to match it.
  - Scientists report that lichen survived over 34 days under Martian conditions in the Mars Simulation Laboratory (MSL) maintained by the German Aerospace Center (DLR).
- 27 April
  - Researchers identify 53 key neurons in the brains of homing pigeons which may explain how the birds navigate using Earth's geomagnetic field.
  - The British company Reaction Engines begins testing the advanced engine precooler system intended for its reusable Skylon spaceplane. If the tests are successful, the hybrid-rocket Skylon – designed to vastly reduce the cost of orbital spaceflight – may begin flying cargo to Earth's orbit by 2020.

=== May ===
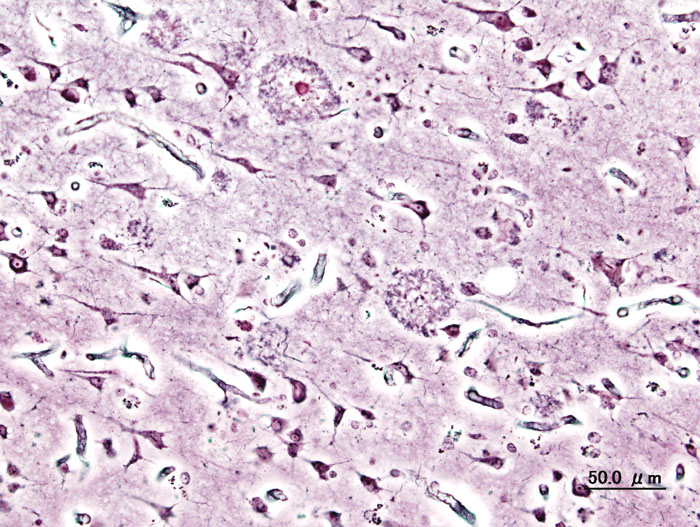
6 May 2012: scientists develop a drug capable of preventing the breakdown of cerebral protein production, potentially offering a new treatment for Alzheimer's disease (cerebral plaques pictured).

- 1 May
  - Scientists report that a new genetic test could diagnose the risk of breast cancer years before the disease actually develops, allowing much more effective early treatment.
  - French researchers successfully create silicene, a one-atom-thick sheet of silicon that is analogous to the much-vaunted graphene. Silicene is theorized to retain silicon's excellent semiconductor properties even at extremely small scales, and could allow the simple mass production of efficient nanoscale computers.
- 2 May – The European Space Agency selects the Jupiter Icy Moon Explorer (JUICE) proposal for its next major space exploration program. The robotic JUICE probe, which is planned to launch in 2022, will conduct in-depth studies of the Jovian moons Callisto, Europa and Ganymede.
- 3 May – In the United Kingdom's first successful ocular implant trial, two men blinded by retinitis pigmentosa have their sight partially restored by prototype microchip implants.
- 8 May – Claire Lomas, a paralyzed British woman, becomes the first person to complete a marathon using a bionic mobility suit. The ReWalk suit allowed her to complete the London Marathon in 16 days.
- 9 May – A detailed design is released for a practical artificial leaf – a potentially revolutionary milestone in the development of sustainable energy.
- 11 May
  - American researchers report that preventable infections are the leading cause of child mortality worldwide. Of the 7.6 million children who died before their fifth birthday in 2010, over 60% died of infections such as pneumonia.
  - Scientists at the University of Science and Technology of China use quantum teleportation to transmit photons over a distance of 97 kilometres (60 mi) – a world record. The teleportation method, which utilises quantum entanglement to transfer information between points without crossing the intervening space, could allow the development of ultra-secure satellite communications.

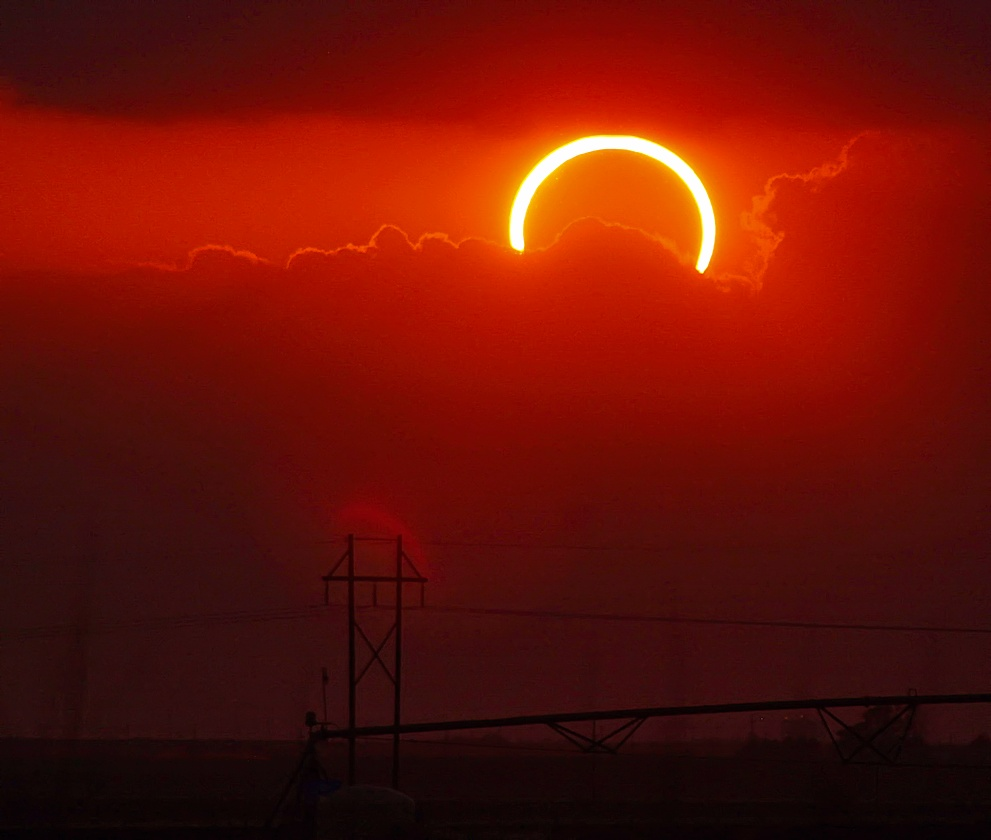
20 May 2012: an annular solar eclipse occurs (eclipse photograph from Wolfforth, Texas, shown).

- 12 May – Scientists refute the theory that sex-linked chromosomes, such as the male Y chromosome, will become extinct. A new study shows that, although such chromosomes have shrunk and lost genetic material, they remain crucially important predictors of fertility.
- 13 May – Researchers claim that there is a strong correlation between the loss of biodiversity and the disappearance of endangered languages and cultures.
- 14 May
  - Researchers extend the lifespan of mice by 24%, using gene therapy applied when the mice were adults. The success of the technique, which involved inducing cells to produce more of the enzyme telomerase, suggests that adult life extension is feasible.
  - Scientists grow healthy bone from human embryonic stem cells. This breakthrough could allow much quicker and easier bone grafts for human patients.
  - Scientists at California's Stanford University invent a working bionic eye powered only by focused light. Though currently a prototype, the device could eventually restore the sight of millions of people with eye diseases such as macular degeneration and retinitis pigmentosa.
- 15 May
  - The United States announces a national plan to develop an effective treatment for Alzheimer's disease by 2025.
  - American scientists develop a device which uses genetically engineered viruses to generate electricity. The invention could allow the development of ubiquitous piezoelectric micro-generators which gather energy from everyday vibrations such as closing doors.
- 16 May
  - American surgeons successfully restore hand function to a partly paralyzed man using a pioneering nerve transfer technique. Following the surgery and subsequent physiotherapy, the patient – who entirely lost the use of his hands in a car accident – can now feed himself and even write with some assistance.
  - Japanese scientists develop a wireless data transmission system which operates in the currently unregulated terahertz frequency spectrum. The system can transmit data at a rate of 3 Gbit/s, a record for wireless data transmission; it could potentially be upgraded to transmit at 100 Gbit/s.
  - The USGS and IAU officially name areas of Mars, including Aeolis Mons, Aeolis Palus and Robert Sharp Crater, relevant to the landing of NASA's Curiosity Mars rover on 6 August 2012.
  - Engineers at Virginia Tech build the world's first 3D-printing vending machine, which allows any member of the public to rapidly print objects on demand by submitting a blueprint to the machine.

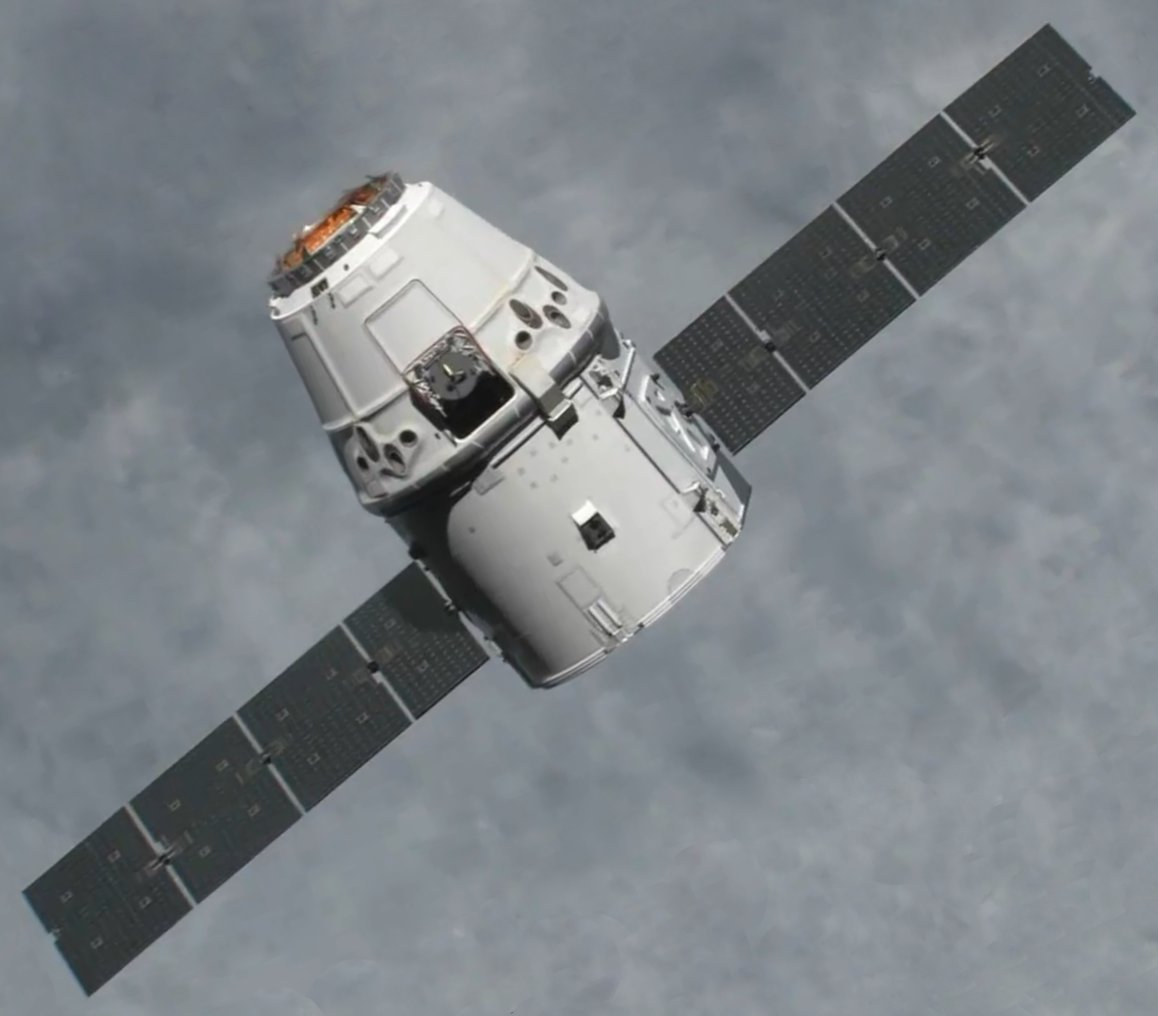
25 May 2012: SpaceX's Dragon becomes the first commercial spacecraft to dock with the International Space Station.

- 20 May – An annular solar eclipse takes place.
- 22 May – American researchers demonstrate a rewritable DNA memory capable of storing digital data.
- 23 May – In a breakthrough for adult stem cell therapy, Israeli scientists grow healthy heart muscle cells from the skin cells of patients. This development could offer a new treatment for heart failure patients.
- 25 May
  - SpaceX's uncrewed Dragon spacecraft completes a successful rendezvous with the International Space Station, becoming the first commercial spacecraft ever to do so.
  - South Africa, Australia and New Zealand agree to co-host the Square Kilometre Array (SKA), the world's largest single radio telescope project. The SKA, which will comprise thousands of individual antennae with a combined signal-collecting area of 1 square kilometre (1,000,000 m^{2}), is expected to begin operations by 2025.
  - American researchers unveil a cloaking device capable of slowing light to a virtual halt within an array of 25,000 microscopic lenses.
  - Archeologists announce the discovery of a 42,000-year-old bone flutes in a German cave – the oldest musical instruments yet discovered.
- 29 May
  - A "road train" of wirelessly linked autonomous vehicles successfully completes a 200-kilometre (120 mi) motorway journey, in Spain's first public test of autonomous vehicles.
  - Iran claims to have developed antivirus software capable of defending against the powerful Flame cyberweapon, which has infected computer networks across the Middle East.
- 30 May
  - Scientists successfully sequence the tomato genome, and state that tastier and more pesticide-resistant tomato varieties can be engineered for commercial use within five years.
  - Geologists report that supervolcanoes can develop much faster than previously suspected – erupting within just a few hundred years of their formation, instead of tens of thousands of years.

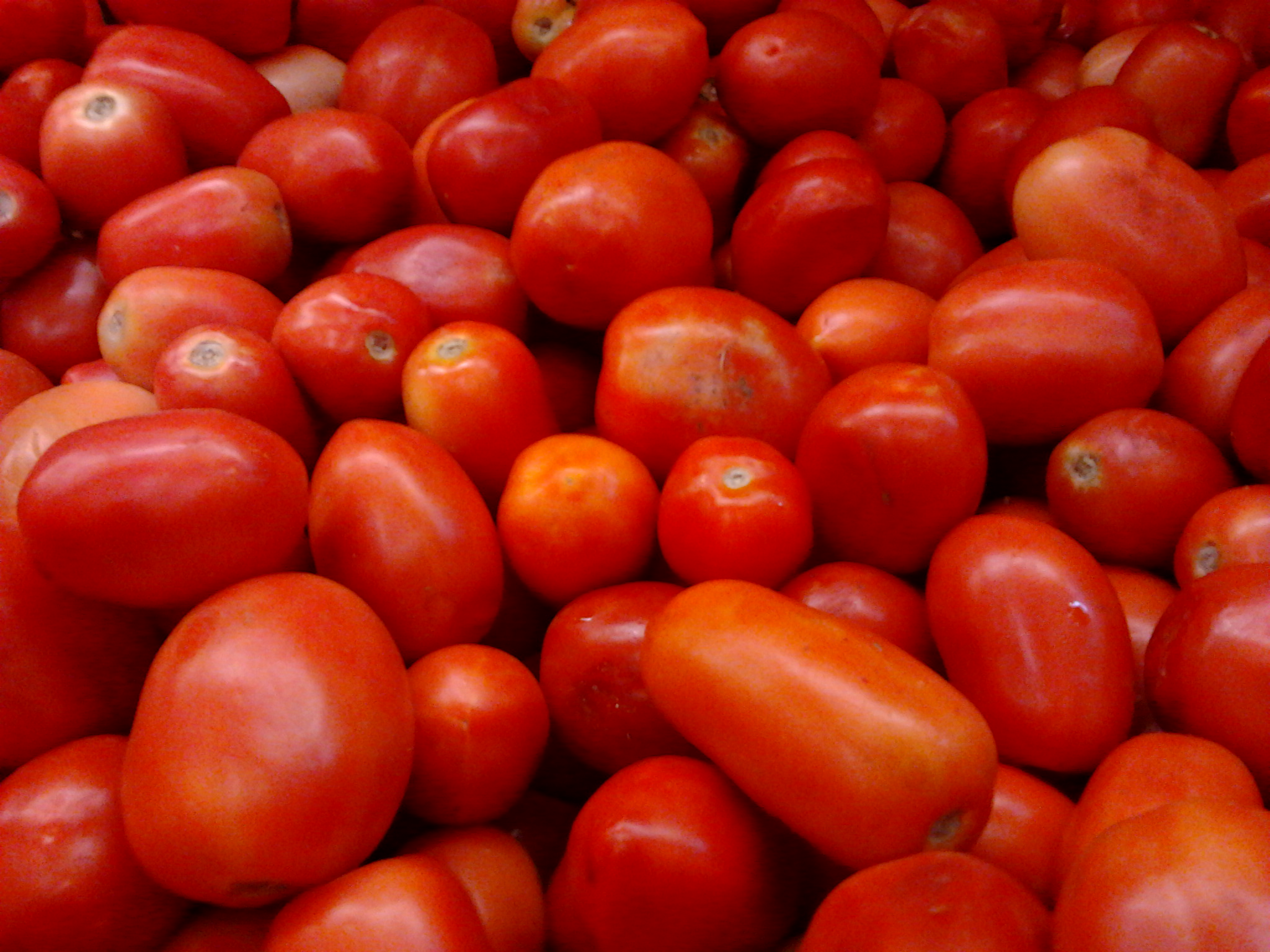
30 May 2012: the tomato genome is fully sequenced by international researchers.

- 31 May
  - SpaceX's Dragon spacecraft returns to Earth following its successful test mission to the International Space Station.
  - Scientists develop a nanotechnology-based immunoassay test which is potentially three million times more sensitive than conventional tests. The new test could revolutionise the early detection of maladies such as cancer and Alzheimer's disease.
  - The International Union of Pure and Applied Chemistry (IUPAC) officially names synthetic elements 114 and 116 "flerovium" and "livermorium", respectively.
  - Sharp Corporation develops a solar cell with the highest solar energy conversion efficiency yet achieved. A conversion efficiency of 43.5% was obtained by using a concentrator triple-junction compound cell, combining a focusing lens with multiple layers of light-absorbing compounds.

=== June ===
- 1 June
  - In a major milestone for neuroscience, researchers publicly release the first installment of data from their project to construct the first whole-brain wiring diagram of a vertebrate brain, that of a mouse.
  - Scientists publish the results of a successful neurorehabilitation study, in which paralysed rats regained the ability to walk and even sprint after receiving targeted electrochemical therapy. The rats' damaged spinal cords were stimulated with chemicals and implanted electrodes, and a robotic assistive harness was used to "teach" the rats to walk again.
  - Australian researchers publish a new study revealing how the zebrafish heals its spinal cord after injury. According to the study, a specialised protein prevents paralysing glial scars forming when zebrafish have spinal cord damage. It is hoped that this protein may be exploited for the treatment of paralysed humans.
- 4 June – A partial lunar eclipse takes place.
- 5 June
  - American glass manufacturer Corning Inc. unveils an ultra-thin, flexible glass dubbed "Willow Glass". The invention, which is similar to Corning's widely used Gorilla Glass, could be used in the development of flexible computer displays and ultra-thin smartphones.
  - The solar-powered Solar Impulse aircraft lands in Morocco after a 19-hour flight from Spain, marking the first intercontinental flight of a purely solar-powered aircraft.

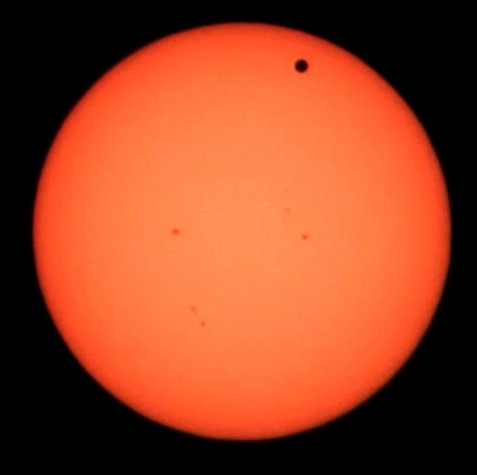
5–6 June 2012: a transit of Venus, the last such event until 2117, occurs (transit image from Minneapolis shown).

- 5–6 June – A transit of Venus, one of the rarest predictable astronomical phenomena, occurs. Another such transit will not occur until the year 2117.
- 6 June
  - An international group of scientists warns that population growth, widespread destruction of natural ecosystems, and climate change may be driving the Earth toward an irreversible change in the biosphere – a planet-wide "tipping point".
  - Scientists at Sweden's Karolinska Institutet achieve a breakthrough in creating a new vaccine, CAD106, for Alzheimer's disease.
  - IPv6, a new version of the Internet Protocol, is officially launched, offering trillions of possible new web addresses.
  - Wales becomes the first nation in the world to have its plants DNA barcoded. A tiny fragment of leaf, seed or root, or even a single pollen grain, can now be used to identify species.
  - German scientists develop zeolite thermal storage pellets that can store four times as much thermal energy as water, and can retain their energy almost indefinitely.
- 7 June
  - According to NOAA scientists, the average temperature for the contiguous United States during May 2012 was 64.3 °F (17.9 °C), 3.3 °F above the long-term average, making it the second-warmest May on record. The month's high temperatures also contributed to the warmest spring, warmest year-to-date, and warmest 12-month period the United States has experienced since recordkeeping began in 1895.
  - Scientists at the University of Washington successfully sequence the genome of an 18-week-old human fetus in the womb by taking blood samples from the mother. In future, millions of children could be safely screened for genetic disorders in this way.
  - The US Naval Research Laboratory has developed a form of underwater solar energy.
  - A team of New Zealand scientists report that measuring the ratio of hydrogen and methane levels on the planet Mars may help determine the likelihood of life on Mars. According to the scientists, "...low H_{2}/CH_{4} ratios (less than approximately 40) indicate that life is likely present and active."
  - In a separate study, a team of Netherland scientists associated with MIT reported methods of detecting hydrogen and methane in extraterrestrial atmospheres.
- 8 June
  - American researchers report that they have successfully developed a key insulation technology required for the ITER nuclear fusion demonstration reactor.
  - American scientists build a tabletop-sized X-ray laser, vastly smaller and cheaper than most such devices. The invention could permit ultra-high-resolution imaging of microscopic structures such as living cells.
  - British researchers begin trialling "smart" hand pumps equipped with transmitters that can immediately detect and report mechanical breakdowns. This will allow vital water pumps to be fixed much more quickly in rural Africa.
  - Japanese researchers grow a tiny, functioning human liver from stem cells.

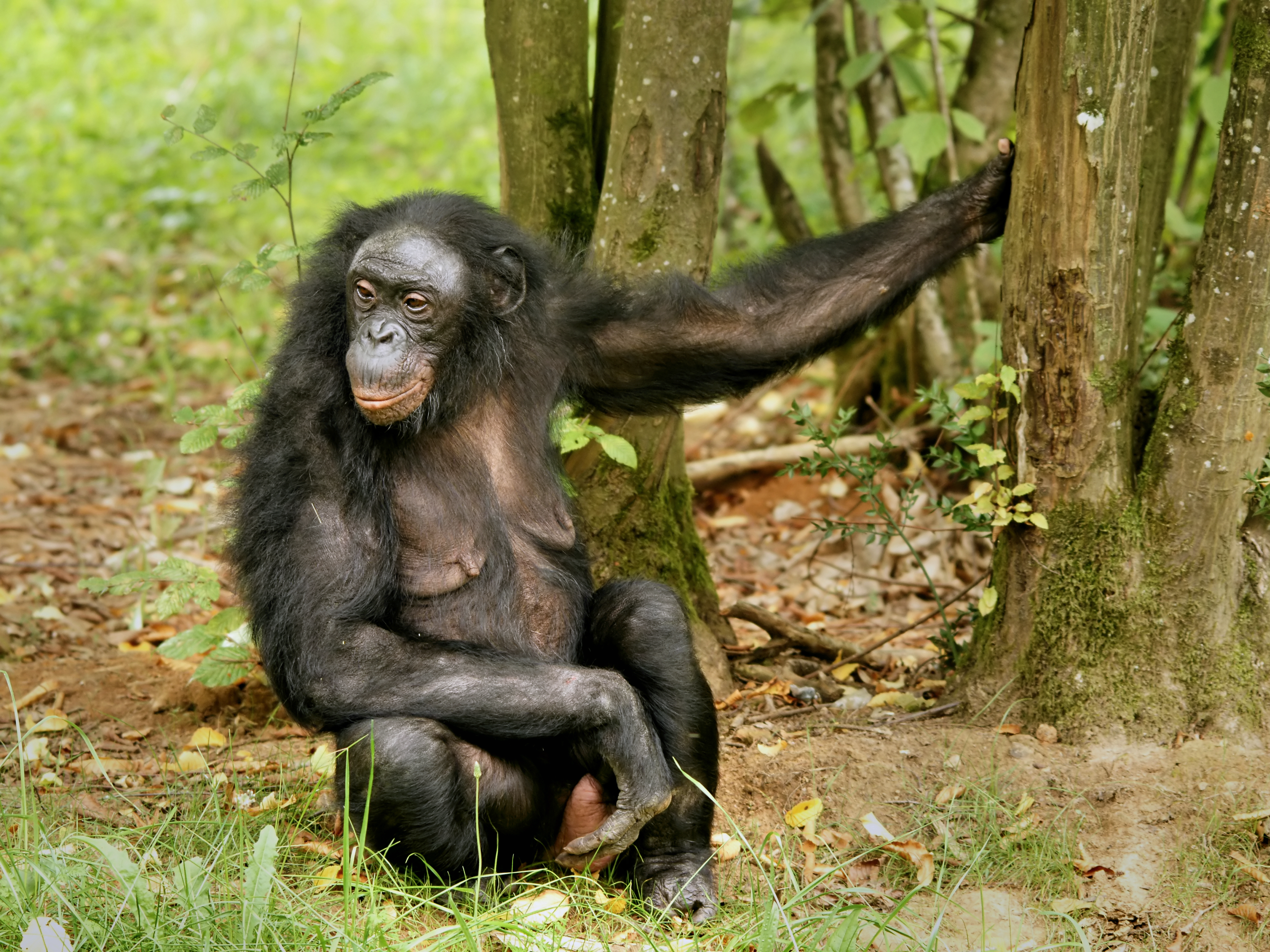
13 June 2012: scientists publish the complete genome of the bonobo (female pictured).

- 10 June
  - Canadian scientists develop a new method of accurately visualising complex protein interactions. The development could have broad implications for the biomedical and bioengineering sciences, including the design of functional bionanomachines.
- 11 June
  - The European Extremely Large Telescope is approved for construction by member states of the European Southern Observatory organization.
- 12 June
  - Scientists unveil a new porous metal-organic framework, NOTT-202, capable of capturing and storing excess carbon dioxide within its structure.
  - An extensive study concludes that several factors aligned to cause the extinction of woolly mammoths.
  - The IARC, a WHO research agency, concludes that diesel exhaust exposure can cause cancer.
  - A123 Systems develops an improved version of its lithium-ion battery cells, potentially lowering the cost of electric vehicles.
- 13 June
  - NASA successfully launches its NuSTAR X-ray space telescope.
  - Scientists fully decode the bonobo genome.
- 14 June
  - Swedish surgeons report having implanted a patient with a working lab-grown vein created with the patient's own stem cells.
  - Chinese researchers report that fields of GM crops can be beneficial to nearby non-GM plants by encouraging the proliferation of beneficial predator insects, which reduce the need for pesticides.
  - Examples of cave art in Spain are dated to around 38,000 BC, making them the oldest examples of art yet discovered in Europe. Scientists theorize that the paintings may have been made by Neanderthals, rather than by homo sapiens.
  - 2012 LZ1, a large near-Earth asteroid, passes by the planet.
  - Physical activity levels are declining worldwide, a trend that raises major health concerns, according to a new study.
  - New research warns that pH levels along the US western seaboard will drop to 7.8 by 2050, with serious consequences for many organisms.
- 15 June
  - American scientists report a possible genetic link between diabetes and an increased risk of Alzheimer's disease.
  - NASA scientists report that Voyager 1 may be very close to entering interstellar space and becoming the first human-made object to leave the Solar System.
- 16 June
  - China successfully launches the crewed Shenzhou 9 spacecraft on a mission to the Tiangong-1 space station module. Shenzhou 9 carries a crew of three, including China's first female astronaut, Liu Yang.
  - The United States Air Force's robotic Boeing X-37B spaceplane returns to Earth after a successful 469-day orbital mission.
- 18 June – Researchers design a robot that can outperform humans in identifying a wide range of natural materials according to their textures. The invention paves the way for advancements in prostheses, personal assistive robots and consumer product testing.
- 19 June – Men who are heavy tea drinkers may be more likely to develop prostate cancer, according to new research.
- 20 June
  - Engineers build a working 50-gigapixel camera by synchronizing 98 tiny cameras in a single device.
  - Renewable energy sources can fill 80 percent of American electricity demand by 2050, according to a new report.
- 21 June
  - Scientists develop the world's first magnetic emulsion, based on magnetic surfactant molecules. The invention could be used to clean up oil spills or even guide medicines through human blood vessels.
  - 2.8-million-year-old climate data is reconstructed from sediment cores recovered from Lake El'gygytgyn, Russia. The data is considerably older than the 800,000-year-old ice cores found in the Antarctic.
- 23 June – 100 years after the birth of English cryptanalyst and computer pioneer Alan Turing, British experts cast doubt on the long-held notion that Turing's death was a suicide.
- 24 June
  - China successfully completes its first manual orbital rendezvous, as the crewed Shenzhou 9 spacecraft docks with the Tiangong-1 module without the assistance of automated docking systems.
  - Rates of sea level rise are increasing three-to-four times faster along portions of the U.S. Atlantic Coast than globally, according to a new U.S. Geological Survey report published in Nature Climate Change.
  - Lonesome George, the last known individual of the Pinta Island tortoise subspecies, dies in Galápagos National Park, probably aged over 100, thus making the subspecies extinct presumptively.
- 26 June
  - Researchers at Google Brain train a large-scale neural network on 10 million images from YouTube videos; the system learned to recognize high-level concepts including cats without being explicitly trained to identify them.
  - The discovery of a new mineral, panguite, is announced, with samples found in the Allende meteorite.
- 27 June
  - Physicists collide gold ions together to produce a quark–gluon plasma, similar to that which existed in the first instant after the Big Bang. In doing so, they momentarily produce what Guinness World Records reports is the highest artificial temperature ever: 4 trillion °C (7.2 trillion °F).
  - Scientists develop a new, high-precision method for modifying organic compounds with new active molecules, easing the development of new medicines.
  - Scientists associated with University of the Witwatersrand, Johns Hopkins University and other international Universities report that early humans, such as Australopithecus sediba, may have lived in savannas but ate fruit and other foods from the forest – behavior similar to modern-day savanna chimpanzees.
- 28 June – An international team of astronomers discovers evidence that the Milky Way had an encounter with a small galaxy or massive dark matter structure perhaps as recently as 100 million years ago, and as a result of that encounter it is still ringing like a bell.

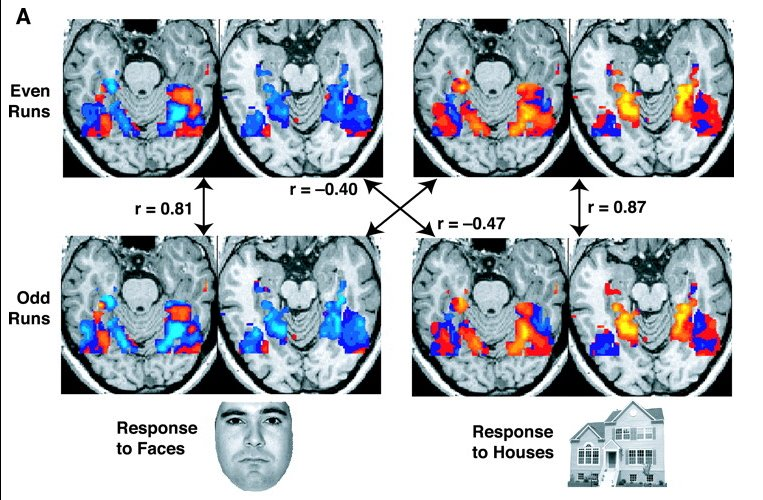
29 June 2012: scientists develop an fMRI brain scanner which allows paralyzed people to communicate using thought alone (fMRI images shown).

- 29 June
  - American researchers demonstrate "paint-on" batteries, composed of active layers just 0.5 mm thick, capable of being spray-painted onto almost any surface. The technology could allow for the creation of lighter, more flexible electronic devices with a wide range of form factors.
  - Dutch and German scientists unveil a new brain-scanning functional magnetic resonance imaging device that allows paralyzed people to type out words using only their thoughts.
  - Scientists discover the remains of an enormous, 3-billion-year-old impact near the Maniitsoq region of West Greenland, a billion years older than any other known collision on Earth.

=== July ===
- 1 July – The London Symphony Orchestra performs a musical composition created without human input by the Iamus computer.
- 2 July
  - American researchers use a 3D printer to build a sugar framework for growing an artificial liver. The sugar structure simulates a human vascular system, allowing artificial blood vessels to be grown to support the liver.
  - Scientists use ultrasound to display 3D video on a modified liquid soap membrane, creating the world's thinnest transparent video display.
  - Graphene sheets with precisely controlled pores can purify water more efficiently than existing methods, according to scientists at MIT.
  - Scientists report that indirect evidence supporting the existence of the Higgs boson has been found.
- 3 July
  - Researchers photograph the shadow of a single atom for the first time.
  - A study led by Kansas State University discovers a new quantum state, which allows three, but not two, atoms to stick together.
- 4 July
  - CERN physicists announce the discovery of a particle consistent with the Standard Model's Higgs boson at a "5 sigma" level of significance, indicating that there is only one chance in 3.5 million to get such a result by chance without a particle.
  - American scientists develop an electrically conductive gel that can easily be printed onto surfaces with a standard inkjet printer, allowing the rapid and simple production of a wide range of electronics.
  - Researchers have identified seven genetic markers linked with a woman's breast size, according to a new study.

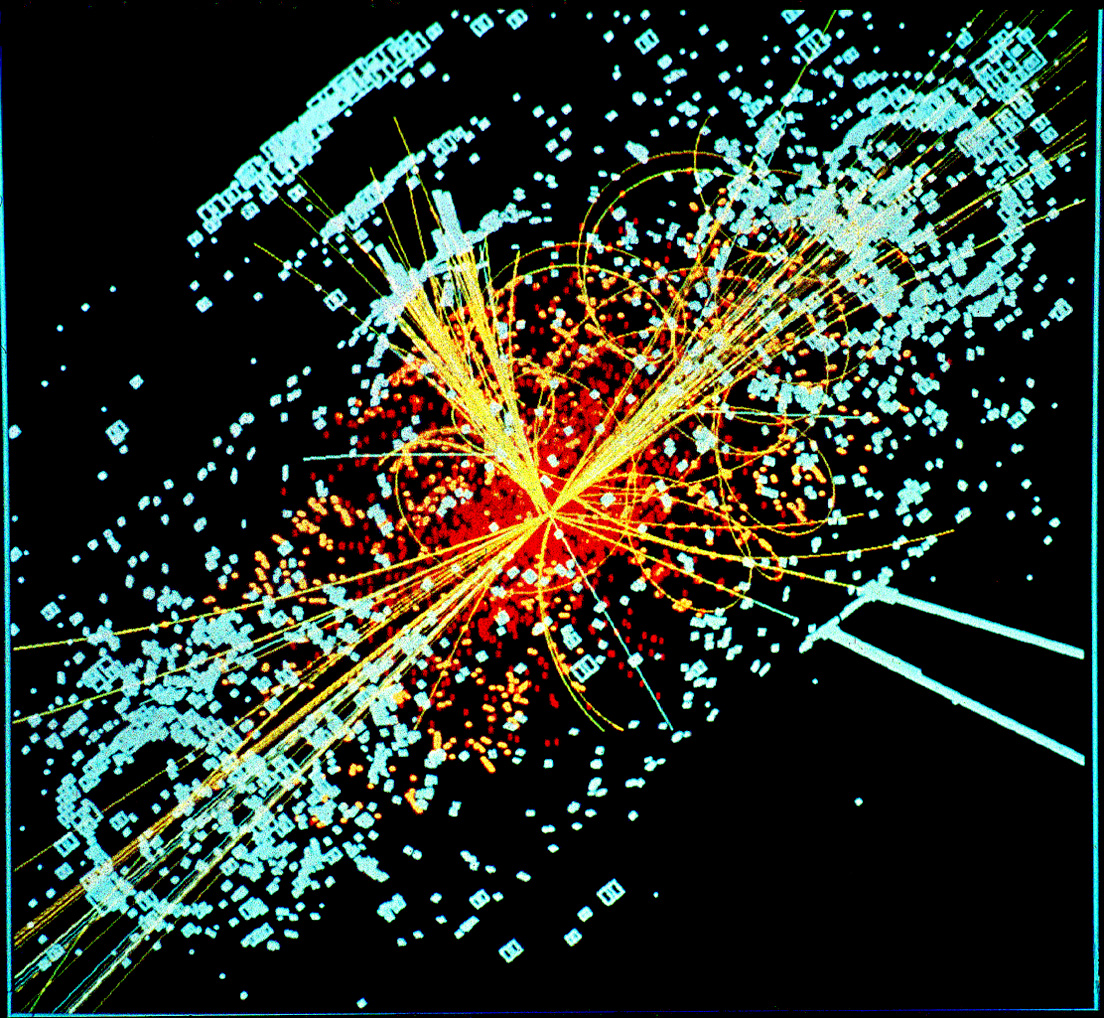
4 July 2012: CERN scientists report the discovery of a particle with significant similarities to the Higgs boson (Higgs collision signature shown).

- 5 July – Scientists have produced the most detailed footage of a single neuron ever seen. In the timelapse video, individual proteins are shown moving through different pathways within the cell.
- 6 July
  - UCLA engineers develop an ultra-high-speed optical microscope capable of quickly and reliably identifying cancer cells in human blood, paving the way for faster, cheaper and more reliable cancer diagnoses.
  - Scientists construct the most biologically accurate robotic legs yet built, closely mimicking the motion of human leg muscles.
- 7 July – Non-human animals including all mammals and birds, and many other creatures including octopuses possess consciousness, according to the new Cambridge Declaration on Consciousness.
- 9 July
  - Scientists discover a new molecule that could potentially make teeth cavity-proof.
  - Scientists have, for the first time, directly detected part of the invisible dark matter "scaffolding" of the universe, where more than half of all matter is believed to reside.
- 10 July
  - A new biofuel production process created by Michigan State University researchers produces energy more than 20 times higher than existing methods.
  - In two new scientific articles, researchers refute NASA's claims that bacteria can successfully incorporate arsenic into their DNA.
  - American scientists develop an electrode-based T-shirt capable of charging cellphones on the move.
  - It is reported that staying seated for long periods of time can reduce the human lifespan, unless mitigated by regular strenuous exercise.
- 11 July
  - New research from the University of Manchester indicates that graphene – already noted for its strength and conductivity – is capable of repairing its structure without human assistance by absorbing loose carbon atoms from its vicinity.
  - NASA's Cassini space probe images a huge gaseous vortex shrouding the south pole of Saturn's moon Titan.
  - Virgin Galactic unveils its privately developed satellite launch vehicle, LauncherOne, and confirms that its SpaceShipTwo spaceplane will soon begin powered test flights.
  - The Hubble Space Telescope discovers a fifth moon of the dwarf planet Pluto.
- 13 July – A new survey shows that lemurs are far more threatened by extinction than previously thought.
- 15 July – It is reported that Dracunculiasis, also called guinea worm disease (GWD), is on the verge of being wiped out – becoming only the second human disease after smallpox to be eradicated.
- 16 July – A major milestone in HIV prevention is reached, as the FDA approves an existing drug, Truvada, for uninfected adults at high risk of acquiring the disease.
- 19 July
  - An iceberg twice as large as Manhattan reportedly breaks off from Greenland's Petermann Glacier.
  - A new nanoparticle coating with self-repairing surface functionality has been developed. The coating uses polymer stalks tipped with functional compounds to repair surface damage.
  - Astronomers have discovered the most ancient spiral galaxy yet, dating back 10.7 billion years.
- 20 July
  - A giant potable aquifer is discovered in Namibia, potentially offering enough drinkable water to sustain the country for centuries.
  - Using mice, researchers have grown sweat glands from newly identified stem cells.

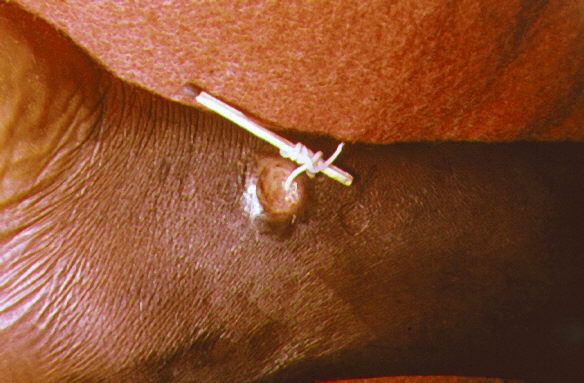
15 July 2012: the parasitic disease Dracunculiasis (extraction of a causative guinea worm pictured) is reportedly close to being eradicated.

- 23 July
  - American scientists create an artificial jellyfish out of silicone and lab-grown heart cells. The construct is capable of swimming in a similar manner to real jellyfish when stimulated with an electric current.
  - Researchers report that 14% of British stomach cancer cases could be prevented by reducing public salt intakes.
  - Researchers create the first complete computer model of a living organism, fully simulating a bacterium.
- 25 July
  - Satellite data reveals that 97% of Greenland's ice is undergoing a thaw, the greatest level of ice melt ever recorded on the landmass.
  - A rift in the Antarctic rock as deep as the Grand Canyon is increasing ice melt from the continent, researchers say.
  - The International Space Station's Alpha Magnetic Spectrometer instrument reports that it has recorded 18 billion cosmic ray events since its installation in 2011.
- 26 July
  - The rapid decline in Arctic sea ice is at least 70% due to man-made global warming, according to a new study, and may even be up to 95% caused by humans – a far higher proportion than scientists had previously thought.
  - Using complex algorithms, researchers have found that pop songs over the last 50 years have become increasingly louder and more bland in terms of the chords, melodies and types of sound used.
  - Using a bone marrow transplant, two men have been "cured" of HIV infection.
  - Ageing termite workers are discovered to use a toxic crystalline structure to "self-destruct", spraying enemy insects with toxins in defence of their termite mounds.
  - An American gunsmith produces the world's first functional 3D-printed plastic firearm.
- 27 July
  - In preparation for the beginning of the 2012 Summer Olympics in London, British telecom companies create a hugely expanded network infrastructure in the city, including over 1,000 new Wi-Fi hotspots and thirty additional mobile phone masts.
  - Swiss scientists claim that Earth's Moon may have been formed in a glancing "hit and run" collision with a large, fast-moving protoplanet.
  - Japanese women have fallen behind Hong Kong citizens in life expectancy for the first time in 25 years, dropping from 86.3 years in 2010 to 85.9 years in 2011. This was partly due to the earthquake and tsunami of March 2011, according to a report by Japan's health ministry.
  - American scientists use microbes to cleanly convert electricity into methane gas, potentially offering a new form of renewable energy.
- 29 July – Major technology companies predict that as many as 50 billion electronic devices may be wirelessly connected worldwide by 2020, as automated machine-to-machine communication sees increasing use in retail and manufacturing.
- 31 July – People with even minor symptoms of mental illness have a lower life expectancy, according to a large-scale population-based study published in the British Medical Journal.

=== August ===
- 1 August – Researchers claim to have resolved one of the biggest controversies in cancer research – discovering the specific cancer cells that seem to be responsible for the regrowth of tumours.

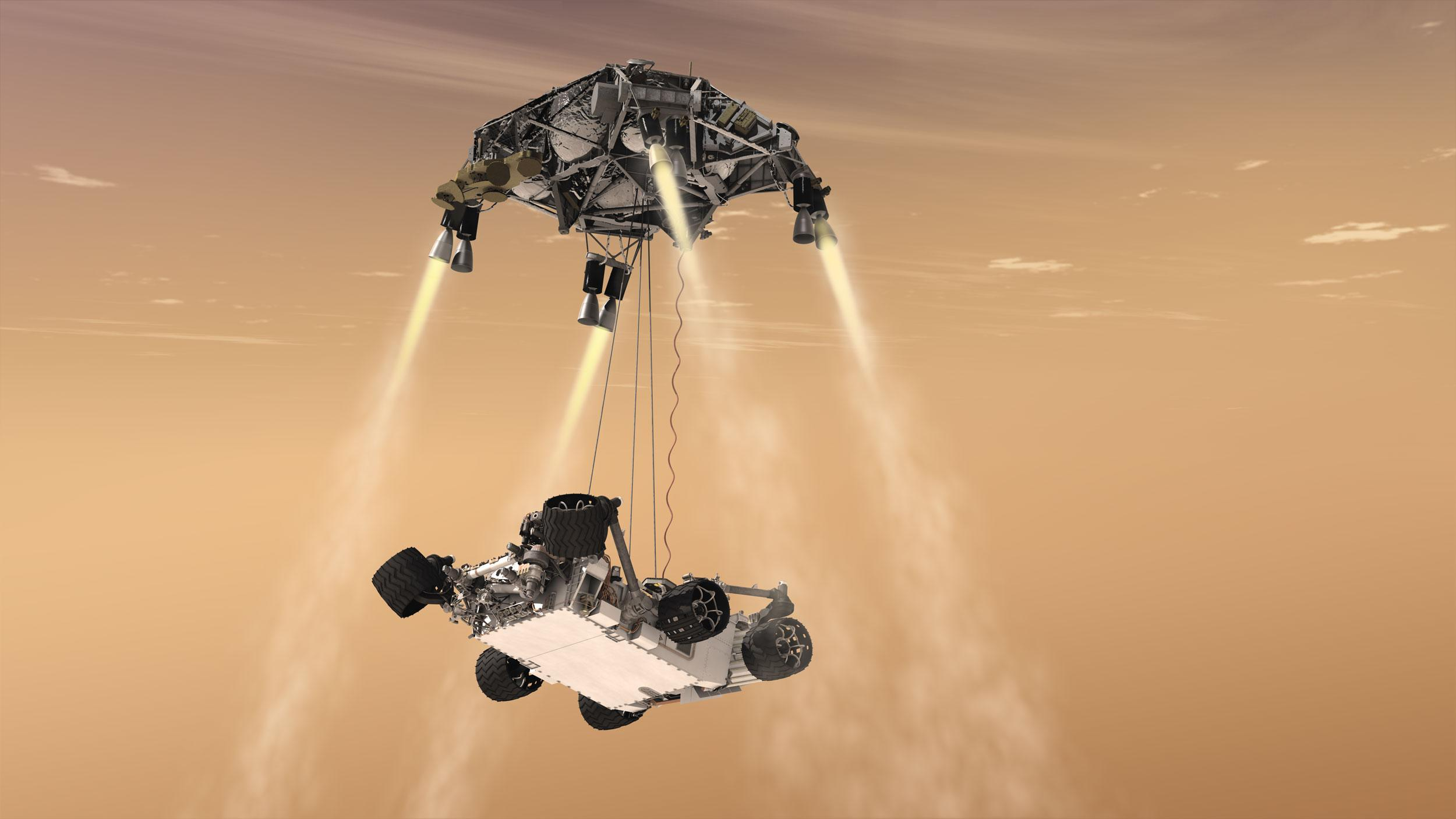
6 August 2012: NASA's Curiosity rover, the largest such spacecraft yet launched, successfully lands on Mars (artist's impression pictured).

- 2 August
  - Scientists in Antarctica announce that they have discovered what appears to be the remains of an ancient rainforest from the early Eocene period buried deep beneath the ice.
  - A study published in Animal Behavior finds that female spiders that cannibalize their mates produce much healthier offspring than non-cannibalizing spiders, supporting a link between sexual cannibalism in the animal kingdom and reproductive success.
- 3 August
  - Deforestation in the Amazon rainforest has fallen again in the past 12 months, according to preliminary data published by Brazil's National Institute for Space Research.
  - American and Canadian researchers develop a medical spray which uses human skin cells and coagulant proteins to speed up the healing of open wounds such as leg ulcers. In medical trials, the "skin spray" proved over 20% more effective than other ulcer treatments.
- 6 August
  - NASA's Mars Science Laboratory mission successfully lands Curiosity, the largest Mars rover yet built, in Mars' Gale Crater.
  - Papua New Guinea's government has approved the world's first commercial deep-sea mining project, despite strong environmental concerns.
- 7 August – New brain research refutes the results of earlier studies that cast doubts on free will.
- 8 August
  - Anthropologists in northern Kenya unearth fossils of a previously unconfirmed species of human that lived approximately 2 million years ago.
  - Almost one-quarter of the world's population lives in regions where groundwater is being used up faster than it can be replenished, concludes a comprehensive global analysis of groundwater depletion published in Nature.
- 9 August – American and South Korean engineers build a flexible, worm-like robot that moves by mimicking the contraction of an earthworm. The robot's artificial muscle is based on a nickel–titanium wire that expands and contracts in response to electric currents. It can squeeze through tight spaces and absorb heavy impacts, and could be used in future for covert reconnaissance missions.
- 10 August – Engineers successfully test a new algorithm that allows autonomous UAVs to fly through complex structures without requiring GPS navigation.
- 11 August
  - The Perseid meteor shower reaches its peak for 2012, becoming widely visible in the Northern Hemisphere.
  - Experts declare the 2012 London Olympics to be the "greenest Olympics ever", praising its use of recycled materials and temporary venues, and noting the improvements made to London's transport infrastructure.
  - Sea ice in the Arctic is disappearing at a far greater rate than previously expected, according to data from the first purpose-built satellite launched to study the thickness of the Earth's polar caps.
- 12 August – Scientists discover a single genetic switch that triggers the loss of brain connections in humans, and also causes depression in animal models. The findings could lead to more effective antidepressant therapies.

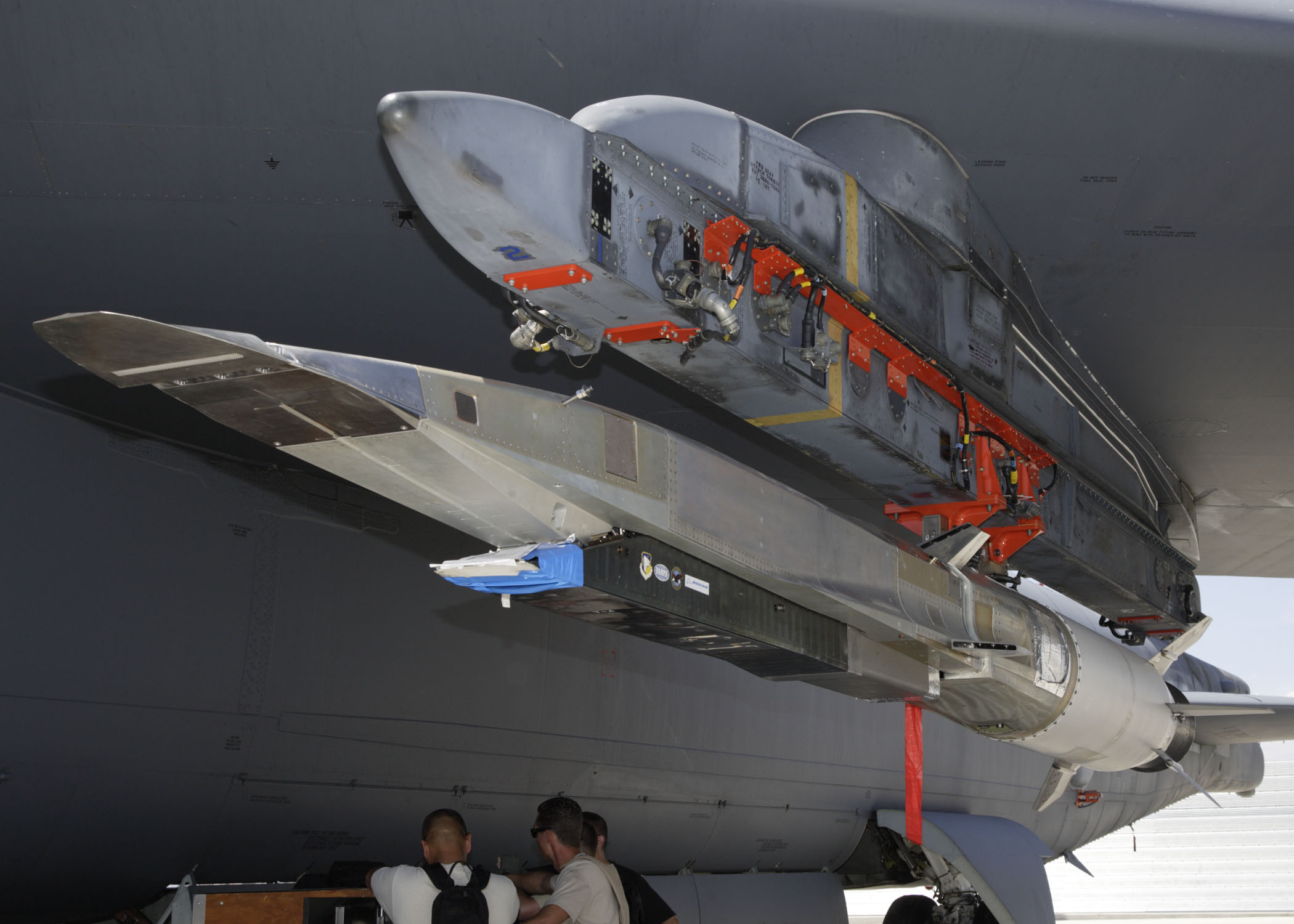
14 August 2012: Boeing's X-51 hypersonic scramjet prototype (pictured in launch configuration) is destroyed following a test flight malfunction.

- 13 August
  - South Korean researchers develop a cheap electronic ink based on tiny rectennas, capable of transmitting data over short distances. The printable invention could potentially revolutionise the field of augmented reality.
  - A new class of polymers has been discovered that are resistant to bacterial attachment. These new materials could lead to a significant reduction in hospital infections and medical device failures.
  - US wind energy reaches 50 gigawatts of capacity.
- 14 August
  - Boeing's X-51 hypersonic scramjet prototype is destroyed during a powered test flight after a control fin failure.
  - Scientists from Singapore shrink the 1972 Playboy centerfold image of Swedish model Lena Soderberg to the width of a human hair. It is hoped that this new miniaturization method will lead to more efficient watermarks or covert messages.
- 15 August – In a major breakthrough, an international team of scientists has proven that addiction to morphine and heroin can be blocked, while at the same time increasing pain relief.
- 16 August
  - Researchers have finally found a compound that may offer the first effective and hormone-free birth control pill for men.
  - British scientists develop the world's first room-temperature maser, using a crystal of p-Terphenyl to modify a commercial medical laser to produce coherent microwave emissions without the need for expensive magnets and coolant. The maser could be used to develop more sensitive medical scanners and radio telescopes.
  - Harvard University scientists develop a flexible, octopus-inspired robot capable of rapidly camouflaging or advertising itself by pumping liquid dyes into channels on its surface. The relatively inexpensive robots could be used in a variety of fields, from surgery to search-and-rescue to covert operations.
- 17 August
  - Jennifer Doudna and Emmanuelle Charpentier publish a pioneering paper on CRISPR-mediated programmable genome editing.
  - A group of South Korean scientists has reportedly developed a carbon battery for electric vehicles capable of charging up to 120 times faster than standard batteries.
  - Researchers have demonstrated a way to potentially "hack into" a person's brain, using BCI technology.
  - Researchers at Harvard's Wyss Institute for Biologically Inspired Engineering successfully store 5.5 petabits of data – around 700 terabytes – in a single gram of DNA, breaking the previous DNA data density record by a thousand times.
- 18 August – Scientists in the United States report that they have found a new family of spiders in the caves of California and Oregon. It is the first such discovery in North America for more than 140 years.
- 19 August – Scientists are reportedly close to developing a baldness cure.
- 20 August – The first evidence of a planet's destruction by its aging star has been discovered by an international team of astronomers.

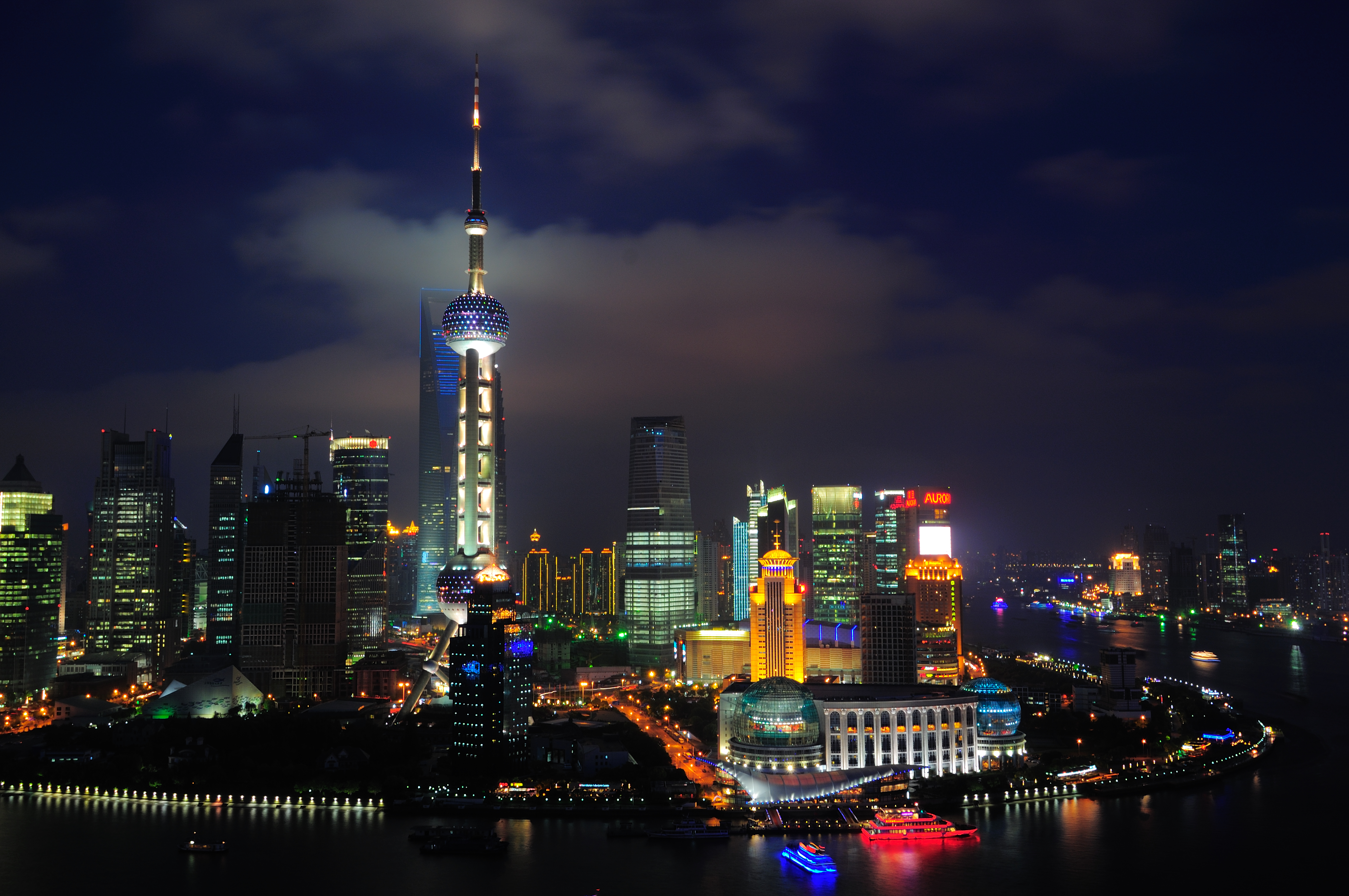
21 August 2012: a study of major coastal cities asserts that Shanghai (skyline pictured) may be highly vulnerable to large-scale flooding in the near future.

- 21 August
  - MIT researchers report that a genetically modified organism could turn carbon dioxide or waste products into a gasoline-compatible transportation fuel.
  - A new study of nine coastal cities around the world suggests that Shanghai is most vulnerable to serious flooding later this century.
  - Life in the world's oceans is facing a potential mass extinction, largely due to human activity, say researchers.
  - Researchers have developed an "electronic nose" prototype that can detect small quantities of harmful airborne substances.
  - Scientists have identified the crucial role of a protein called Mof in the epigenetics of stem cells. The protein helps prime stem cells to become specialized cells in mice.
  - Analysts report that robotic technology is seeing increased use in the global mining industry, as mining and drilling companies seek to reduce personnel costs by installing autonomous trains, trucks, drills and underwater vehicles.
- 22 August
  - LG Electronics unveils the world's largest commercial ultra-definition TV, boasting four times the resolution of 1080p high-definition screens.
  - NASA names the Curiosity rover's Martian landing site "Bradbury Landing", in honour of the American science fiction author Ray Bradbury, who died in June 2012 aged 91. Meanwhile, Curiosity conducts a successful short-range test drive, proving that its mobility system is in nominal condition.
  - A large-scale test of smart vehicle data sharing begins in Ann Arbor, Michigan. Over the course of the year-long trial, around 2,800 vehicles will be fitted with vehicle-to-vehicle wireless communications, allowing them to share data about their movements and alert their drivers if they are at risk of collision. Such technology could be used in future to drastically reduce traffic accidents.
- 23 August – New research links the origins of Indo-European languages with the spread of farming from Anatolia approximately 8,000-9,500 years ago.
- 25 August
  - NASA's Voyager 1 crosses the heliopause and enters interstellar space, the first human-made object to do so.
  - Researchers discover a promising new drug target for the treatment and prevention of heart failure.
- 26 August
  - Besse Cooper, at the time the world's oldest living human, celebrates her 116th birthday, becoming one of only eight people in recorded history to indisputably do so.
  - Miniature surgical nets could be used to safely extract dangerous blood clots from the brains of stroke patients, potentially alleviating symptoms such as speech loss and paralysis, according to two new medical studies.
- 27 August – Young people who smoke cannabis run the risk of a significant and irreversible reduction in their IQ, according to one of the largest cannabis studies ever carried out.
- 28 August – Three decades after its last sighting, the Japanese river otter is declared extinct.
- 29 August
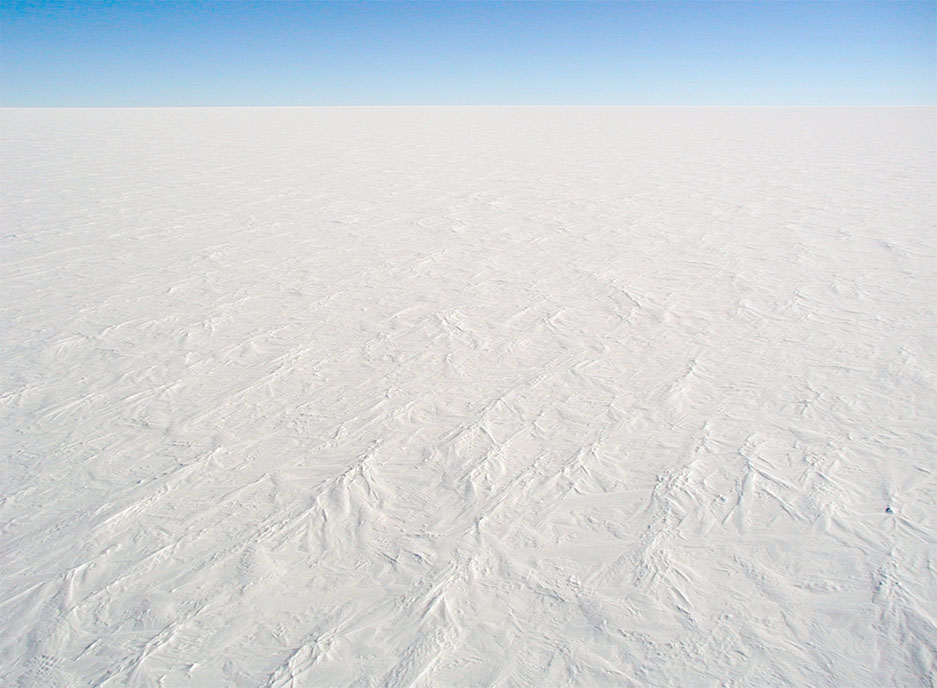
  29 August 2012: scientists claim that large volumes of methane could be trapped beneath the Antarctic ice.
  - Scientists report the discovery of two new exoplanets orbiting a binary star – the first such planetary system yet discovered.
  - Caloric restriction fails to extend primate lifespan, according to the results of a long-term study.
  - Large volumes of methane – a potent greenhouse gas – could be locked beneath the Antarctic ice, according to a new study.
  - Better management of agricultural systems could provide enough food for the expected global population of 9 billion by 2050, according to a new study. However, the study ignores factors such as climate change and geopolitics.
  - A cost analysis of the technologies needed to transport materials into the stratosphere to reduce the amount of sunlight hitting Earth and therefore reduce the effects of global climate change shows that they are both feasible and affordable.
  - In a world first, astronomers at Copenhagen University report the detection of a specific sugar molecule, glycolaldehyde, in a distant star system. The molecule was found around the protostellar binary IRAS 16293-2422, which is located 400 light years from Earth. Glycolaldehyde is needed to form ribonucleic acid, or RNA, which is similar in function to DNA. This finding suggests that complex organic molecules may form in stellar systems prior to the formation of planets, eventually arriving on young planets early in their formation.
  - Scientists at the University of Liverpool are leading a £1.65 million project to produce and test the first nanomedicines for treating HIV/AIDS.
- 30 August – South African scientists claim that a breakthrough drug cures all strains of malaria. Clinical trials on humans are set to start in 2013.
- 31 August
  - Researchers successfully perform the first implantation of an early prototype bionic eye with 24 electrodes.
  - Swedish roboticists begin a crowdsourcing project to collect thousands of 3D Kinect images of household objects which can be used to improve the navigation capabilities of domestic robots.
  - A gaze-tracking smart television that can be controlled by the eye movements of users is unveiled at a Berlin trade show.

=== September ===
- 1 September
  - When they encounter a fallen bird, western scrub jays call out and gather around the body in a funeral-like display, scientists discover.
  - NASA scientists report that polycyclic aromatic hydrocarbons (PAHs), subjected to interstellar medium (ISM) conditions, are transformed, through hydrogenation, oxygenation and hydroxylation, into more complex organics. This process is described as "a step along the path toward amino acids and nucleotides, the raw materials of proteins and DNA, respectively". Furthermore, as a result of these transformations, the PAHs lose their spectroscopic signature which could be one of the reasons "for the lack of PAH detection in interstellar ice grains, particularly the outer regions of cold, dense clouds or the upper molecular layers of protoplanetary disks."
- 2 September – Austrian scientists develop a 3D printing method which can construct complex microscopic structures out of individual molecules.
- 3 September – Swiss engineers build a versatile, self-righting all-terrain legged robot, similar to Boston Dynamics' BigDog military robot.

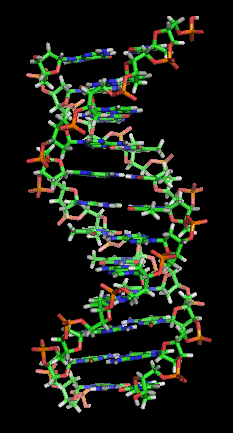
5 September 2012: the most detailed analysis of the human genome yet produced is published.

- 4 September
  - The UK Office for National Statistics estimates that almost all British children born in 2012 could live to the age of 100, assuming recent improvements in healthcare and living standards continue.
  - A formal study finds little evidence of health benefits from organic foods.
  - British scientists develop a smart, pressure-mapping carpet with an optical layer that can raise the alarm if it detects sudden falls. The carpet can also map and record walking patterns over time, allowing doctors to track movement problems in elderly patients.
  - A physically active lifestyle can lower the risk of breast cancer by up to 13%, according to the largest-ever study of its kind.
  - Coastal erosion due to rising sea levels may have been "dramatically underestimated", according to a new scientific model.
- 5 September
  - An international research team achieves quantum teleportation over a record-breaking distance of 143 kilometres (89 mi) through free space.
  - Scientists publish (in Science, Nature and elsewhere) the most detailed analysis to date of the human genome, revealing that much more of our genetic code is biologically active than previously thought, and largely disproving the notion of junk DNA.
  - Increased precipitation and river discharge in the Arctic has the potential to speed climate change, according to the results of a new study.
  - A new report by Oxfam suggests that the full impact of climate change on future food prices is being greatly underestimated.
  - NASA's Dawn spacecraft departs the asteroid 4 Vesta for the dwarf planet Ceres, which it is expected to reach in 2015.
- 6 September
  - Japan sets a new world record for ocean drilling depth, reaching 2,111 metres (6,926 ft) below the seafloor off Shimokita Peninsula.
  - A regular intake of fish oils, together with moderate exercise, significantly helps to slow aging decline, according to a recent trial.
  - Researchers in the US produce the shortest-ever laser pulses, with a duration of 67 attoseconds. Such "attosecond science" will make it possible to observe some of the briefest microscopic events in the universe, such as electrons moving in their orbitals, in real time.
  - DARPA's cheetah legged robot prototype is recorded running faster than Usain Bolt, the world's fastest sprinter, in a treadmill test.
- 7 September
  - Harvest Automation begins deliveries of its HV-100 agricultural robot, a commercial automaton capable of navigating around obstacles and working in teams to perform horticultural tasks such as pruning and spraying crops.
  - Flooded mines could supply 40% of Glasgow's heating, say geologists.
- 9 September – If it is fully harnessed, wind energy could easily meet all of the world's long-term electricity demand, according to a new study.

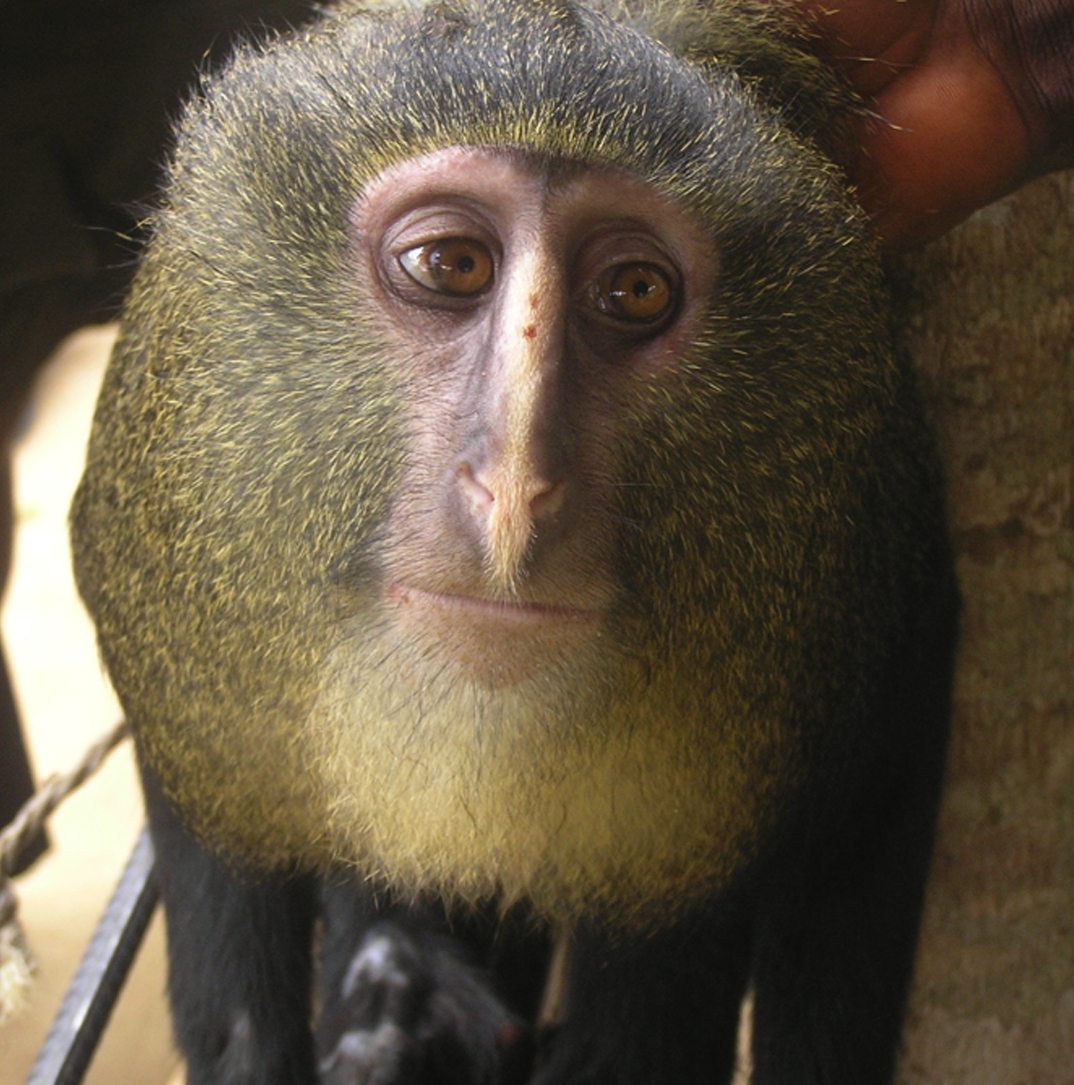
12 September 2012: the monkey species Cercopithecus lomamiensis is formally described.

- 10 September
  - A new scientific model suggests that even more extrasolar planets could harbour life than previously estimated. The model assumes that subsurface liquid water could host alien life, in addition to the surface water that scientists are searching for on nearby exoplanets.
  - Caribbean coral reefs are on the verge of collapse, with less than 10% of the reef area showing live coral cover.
- 12 September
  - UK researchers report a major advance in the treatment of deafness, using stem cells to successfully restore hearing in animals for the first time.
  - A new species of monkey is identified in the Democratic Republic of Congo. Found in remote forests, it is only the second new monkey species to be discovered in Africa in 28 years.
  - Intel Corporation reveals details of its new Haswell microarchitecture, a 22 nanometer microchip family offering unprecedented computing power and energy efficiency for consumer electronics. The first commercial Haswell-powered devices are expected to emerge in 2013.
  - Microsoft unveils a patent for a 3D video gaming system that would allow real-time video to be projected on the walls of any room, creating a 360-degree game environment to immerse players.
- 13 September
  - Small spherical "blueberries" found in Martian rocks may have been formed by microbes, possibly indicating that life existed on Mars in the distant past.
  - UNICEF reports that global child mortality rates have decreased significantly in recent years. Whereas approximately 12 million children died before their fifth birthday in 1990, by 2011 this figure had dropped to 6.9 million. This improvement is reportedly due to a combination of rising living standards, foreign aid and broader immunisation.
  - An IBM team in Zürich has published single-molecule images so detailed that the type of atomic bonds between their atoms can be discerned.
  - Scientists identify five genes that determine the form of the human face, in a find that could lead to police identification sketches based solely on DNA findings.
- 14 September
  - Scientists demonstrated that a brain implant can improve cognitive function in primates for the first time ever. IOP
  - UK weather forecasters can predict extreme winter weather in future seasons with more confidence, due to a new analytical computer model.

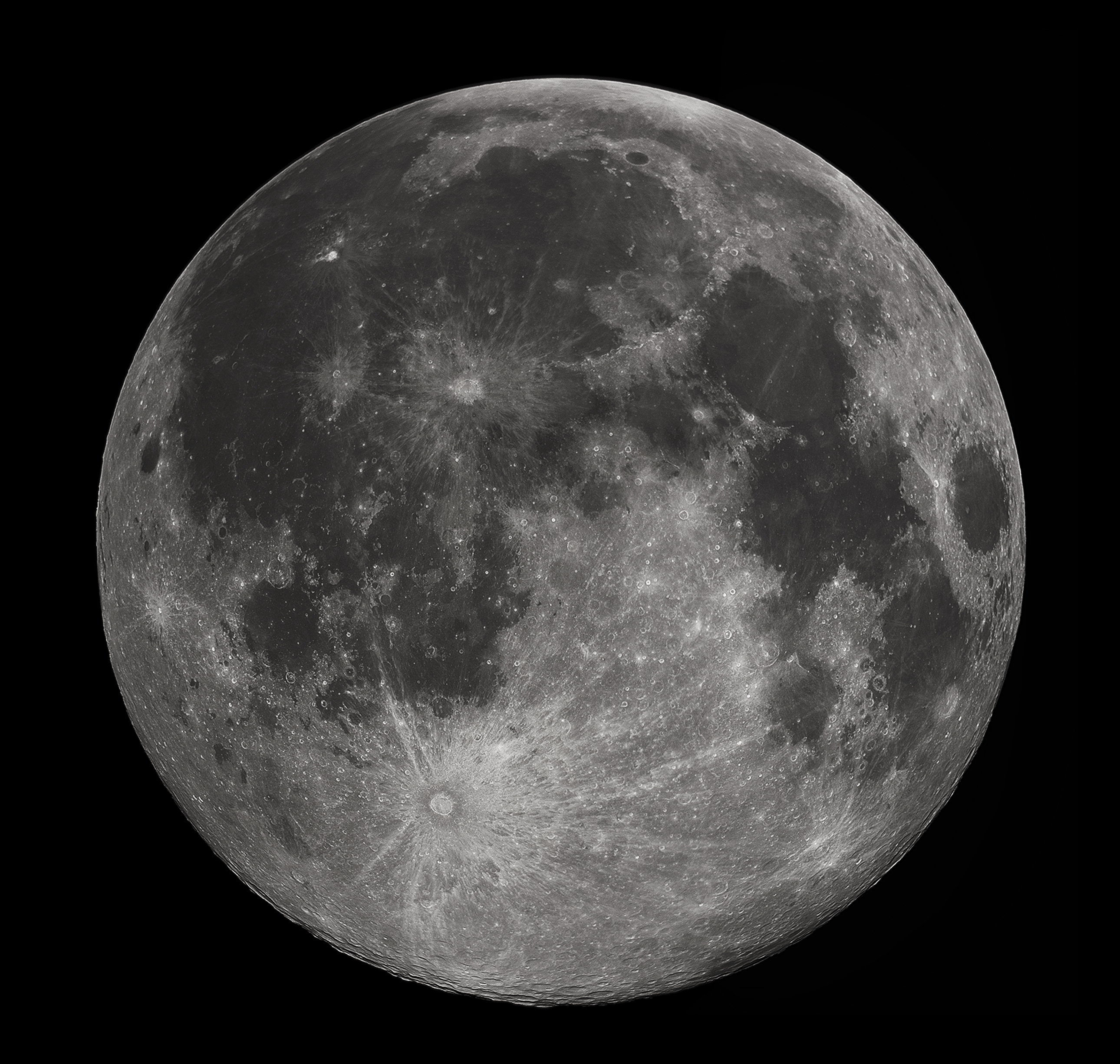
17 September 2012: after nine months studying the Moon's gravitational field, NASA's GRAIL satellites report that the lunar crust is much thinner than previously estimated.

- 17 September
  - A warp drive to achieve faster-than-light travel, a supposedly impossible goal, may not be as unrealistic as once thought, scientists say.
  - Scientists working on the Blue Brain Project have achieved a major breakthrough in mapping the human brain, identifying key principles that determine synapse-scale connectivity and making it possible to accurately predict the locations of synapses in the neocortex.
  - NASA's twin GRAIL gravitational research satellites reveal that the Moon has a much thinner crust than previously assumed.
- 18 September
  - The Dark Energy Survey's high-resolution camera begins operation in Chile, surveying distant galaxies for evidence of the action of dark energy.
  - Massachusetts-based company Rethink Robotics releases its Baxter industrial robot, the first humanoid robot designed to apply common sense and machine learning to factory operations.
  - Doctors in Sweden have performed the world's first mother-to-daughter uterus transplants.
- 19 September
  - Researchers at the University of Cambridge develop a method for cheaply printing liquid crystal-based lasers using a standard inkjet printer. The invention could allow the creation of "smart wallpaper" with built-in video displays.
  - Arctic sea ice has reached its minimum extent for the year, setting a record for the lowest cover since satellite records began in the 1970s. The 2012 extent has fallen to 3.41 million km^{2} (1.32 million sq mi), 50% lower than the 1979–2000 average.
  - When a huge meteor collided with Earth about 2.5 million years ago and fell into the southern Pacific Ocean, it not only could have generated a massive tsunami, but may also have plunged the world into the Ice Ages, a new study suggests.
  - A new study reveals that fast-flowing and narrow glaciers have the potential to trigger massive changes in the Antarctic ice sheet and contribute to rapid ice-sheet decay and sea-level rise.

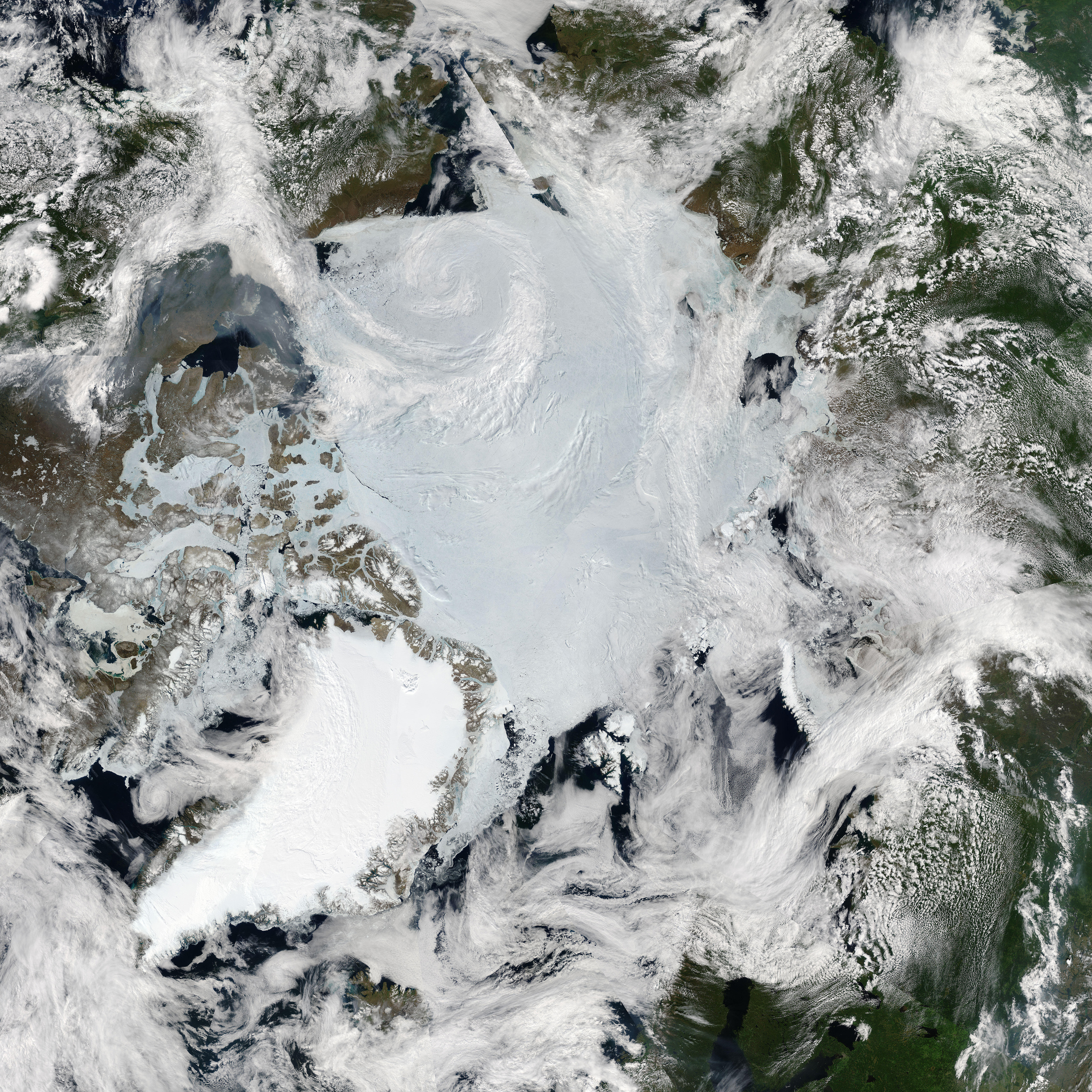
19 September 2012: sea ice cover in the Arctic reaches the lowest extent ever recorded.

- 20 September
  - MakerBot Industries, an American manufacturer of 3D printers, opens the world's first 3D printer retail outlet in New York City.
  - Elevated CO_{2} levels on humans cause decreased cognitive ability, starting at 600 ppm.
- 22 September – NASA reveals plans for the "Gateway Spacecraft", a permanent outpost beyond the Moon, to be constructed from leftover components of the International Space Station.
- 23 September
  - Researchers have shown that many species of fruit fly will be unable to survive even a modest increase in temperature. Many are now close to or beyond their temperature safety margin, and very few have the genetic ability to adapt to climate change.
  - Japanese researchers achieve a new world record for data transmission, demonstrating one-petabit-per-second fiber transmission over 50 kilometres (31 mi): equivalent to sending 5,000 HDTV videos per second over a single fiber.
  - The first continent-wide estimate of African great ape distribution and its changes over time has revealed a dramatic decline in ape habitats.
- 24 September
  - UK doctors report that a new "SARS-like" respiratory coronavirus has been identified. The disease has infected at least two people in the Middle East and killed one.
  - A major reassessment of 18 years of satellite observations provides a new, more detailed view of the changes in sea level around the world. Incorporating the data from a number of spacecraft, the study re-affirms that ocean waters globally are rising by just over 3mm per year.
  - The entire field of particle physics is set to switch to open-access publishing, a milestone in the push to make research results freely available to readers.
- 25 September
  - New data from the Chandra X-Ray Observatory suggests that the Milky Way galaxy is surrounded by a gigantic halo of hot gas, with a far greater radius than the galaxy itself, and a roughly equal mass. If the halo's dimensions are confirmed, its concentration of mass may explain the apparent lack of baryonic matter in the galaxy.
  - China's first aircraft carrier, a retrofitted ex-Soviet vessel named the Liaoning, enters naval service.
- 26 September – An international team of scientists identifies a key factor responsible for declining muscle repair during ageing, and discovers how to halt the process in mice with a common drug.
- 27 September
  - Researchers have shown for the first time the trapping action of the pimpernel sundew, Drosera glanduligera, a carnivorous plant.
  - NASA scientists announce the Curiosity rover's discovery of evidence of ancient flowing liquid water on Mars.
  - Researchers demonstrate a new type of biodegradable electronics technology with wide applications in medical implants, environmental monitors and consumer devices.
  - Toyota begins development of the Human Support Robot, a voice-controlled domestic robot designed to help elderly and disabled people by moving objects, reaching high shelves and opening doors and curtains.
- 30 September – Climate change will lead to smaller fish, according to a new study led by fisheries scientists at the University of British Columbia. Under a high emissions scenario, the maximum body weight most fish species reach could decline by up to a quarter by 2050.

=== October ===
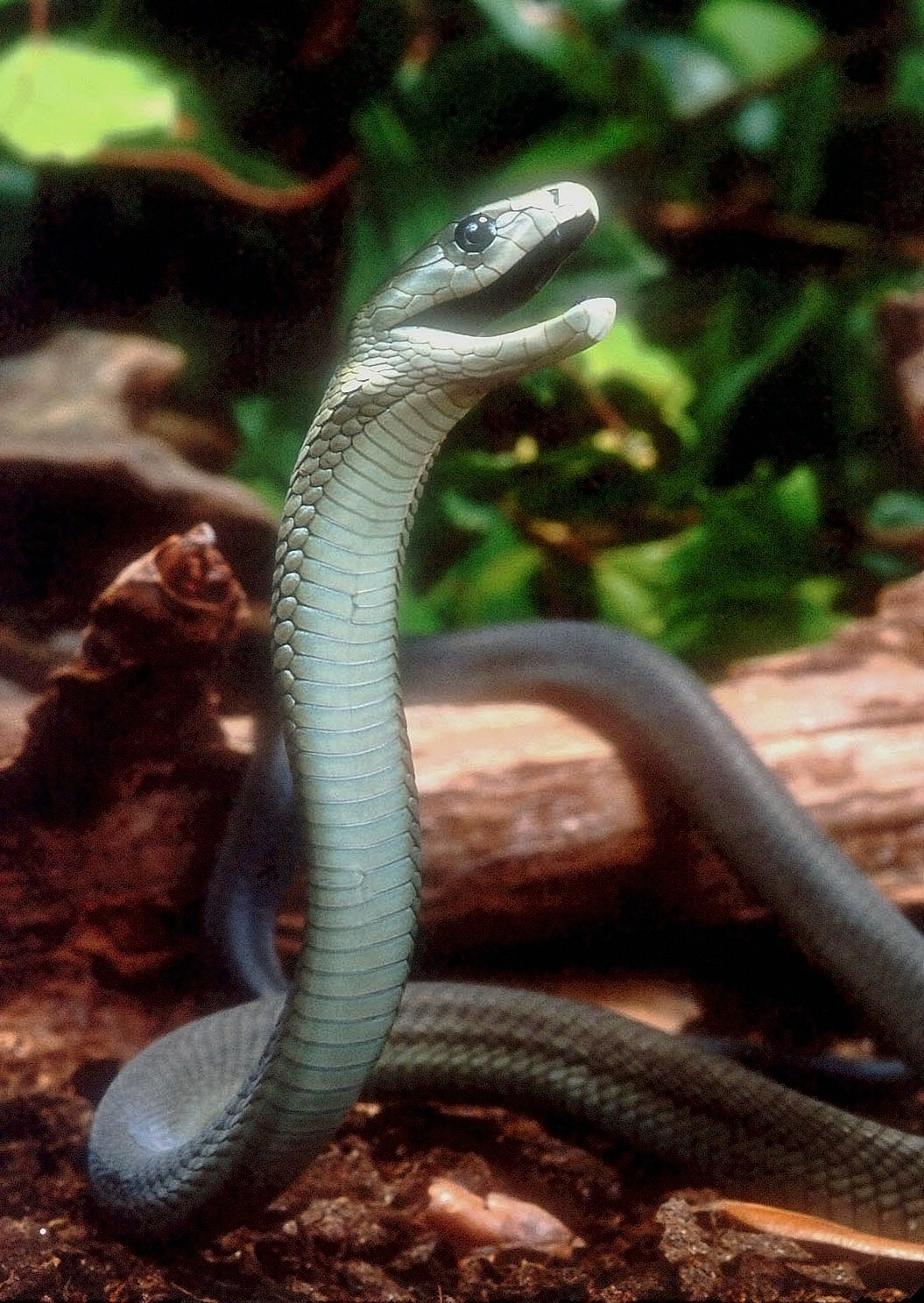
3 October 2012: scientists discover that the black mamba (pictured), best known for its lethal venom, also produces a highly effective painkiller.

- 1 October – Sea cucumbers and sea urchins are able to change the elasticity of collagen within their bodies, and could hold the key to maintaining a youthful appearance, according to scientists at Queen Mary, University of London.
- 2 October – Under a high-emissions climate change scenario, global sea levels could rise nearly 7 metres (23 ft) by the year 3000, according to new research.
- 3 October
  - In preparation for a land speed record attempt, the British Bloodhound SSC team conducts a successful hybrid rocket test in Newquay. The rocket will operate in tandem with a Eurofighter Typhoon jet engine to propel the Bloodhound vehicle at 1,000 miles (1,600 km) per hour during its record attempt in 2014.
  - Scientists report that the venomous black mamba produces a highly effective natural painkiller.
  - A startup company demonstrates a cheap and efficient method of printing complex electronics onto flexible substrates.
- 4 October
  - A new genetic test can fully sequence the genome of a newborn baby in just 50 hours, a major improvement over the usual month-long sequencing process. The test can screen for 3,500 genetic diseases, allowing critically ill infants to be diagnosed and treated much more effectively.
  - Nissan unveils the NSC-2015, a prototype electric driverless car that can park itself, understand road markings and quickly report attempted thefts. A commercial version is planned for 2015.
- 5 October
  - DARPA successfully tests technology which enables drones to conduct aerial refueling autonomously.
  - Tokyo Institute of Technology researchers make a breakthrough in teaching a computer to understand human brain function. The scientists used fMRI datasets to train a computer to predict the semantic category of an image originally viewed by five different people.
- 7 October – Expanding production of palm oil – a common ingredient in processed foods, soaps and personal care products – is driving rainforest destruction and massive carbon dioxide emissions, according to a new study led by researchers at Stanford and Yale universities.
- 8 October
  - SpaceX's Dragon spacecraft launches on its first operational resupply mission to the International Space Station, following a successful demonstration mission in May 2012.
  - A variant in a gene involved with inflammation and the immune response is linked with a decreased risk of lung cancer, according to researchers at the National Cancer Institute in Rockville, Maryland.
  - Researchers have found what they claim is the first fossil yet discovered of an ancient spider attacking prey caught in its web. The amber fossil dates back between 97 million and 110 million years.
  - A new Alzheimer's drug, Solanezumab, slows the pace of memory loss in patients by 34%, according to the results of two trials.
  - The 2012 Nobel Prize in Physiology or Medicine is awarded jointly to John B. Gurdon and Shinya Yamanaka, for the discovery that mature cells can be reprogrammed to become pluripotent stem cells.

8–10 October 2012: the year's Nobel Prizes in physics, chemistry and medicine (medal pictured) are awarded.

- 9 October
  - Microsoft tests a sensor bracelet that can quickly recognise a wide variety of human hand gestures. The invention could be used as a general-purpose remote control for electronics, allowing devices to be activated and controlled with simple hand movements.
  - The 2012 Nobel Prize in Physics is awarded jointly to Serge Haroche and David J. Wineland "for ground-breaking experimental methods that enable measuring and manipulation of individual quantum systems". Their work may eventually help make quantum computing possible.
- 10 October
  - Arizona State University researchers develop a new software system capable of estimating greenhouse gas emissions across entire urban landscapes, all the way down to roads and individual buildings. Previously, scientists quantified carbon dioxide (CO_{2}) emissions at a much broader level.
  - SpaceX's Dragon spacecraft docks with the International Space Station, becoming the first commercially contracted re-supply vehicle to do so.
  - The 2012 Nobel Prize in Chemistry is awarded jointly to Robert J. Lefkowitz and Brian Kobilka for their work on G-protein-coupled receptors.
  - The United States Navy begins funding the development of a versatile robot capable of adapting everyday materials to rescue trapped humans.
- 11 October
  - In the largest-ever genetic study of cholesterol and other blood lipids, an international consortium has identified 21 new gene variants associated with risks of heart disease and metabolic disorders. The findings expand the list of potential targets for drugs and other treatments for lipid-related cardiovascular disease, a leading global cause of death and disability.
  - New research led by Yale University scientists suggests that a rocky planet twice Earth's size orbiting a nearby star is composed largely of diamond.
- 12 October – Europe launches the third and fourth of its Galileo navigation satellites, making it possible for the Galileo system to be fully tested prior to the start of operations in 2015. The system is planned to become fully operational, with 27 active satellites, by 2020.
- 14 October
  - Austrian skydiver Felix Baumgartner performs the highest skydive yet attempted, jumping from a pressurized capsule 24 miles (39 km) above Roswell, New Mexico. Baumgartner became the first human to break the sound barrier without an aircraft during his jump.
  - Scientists claim that water molecules found in lunar soil could be produced by the solar wind reacting with the Moon's surface.

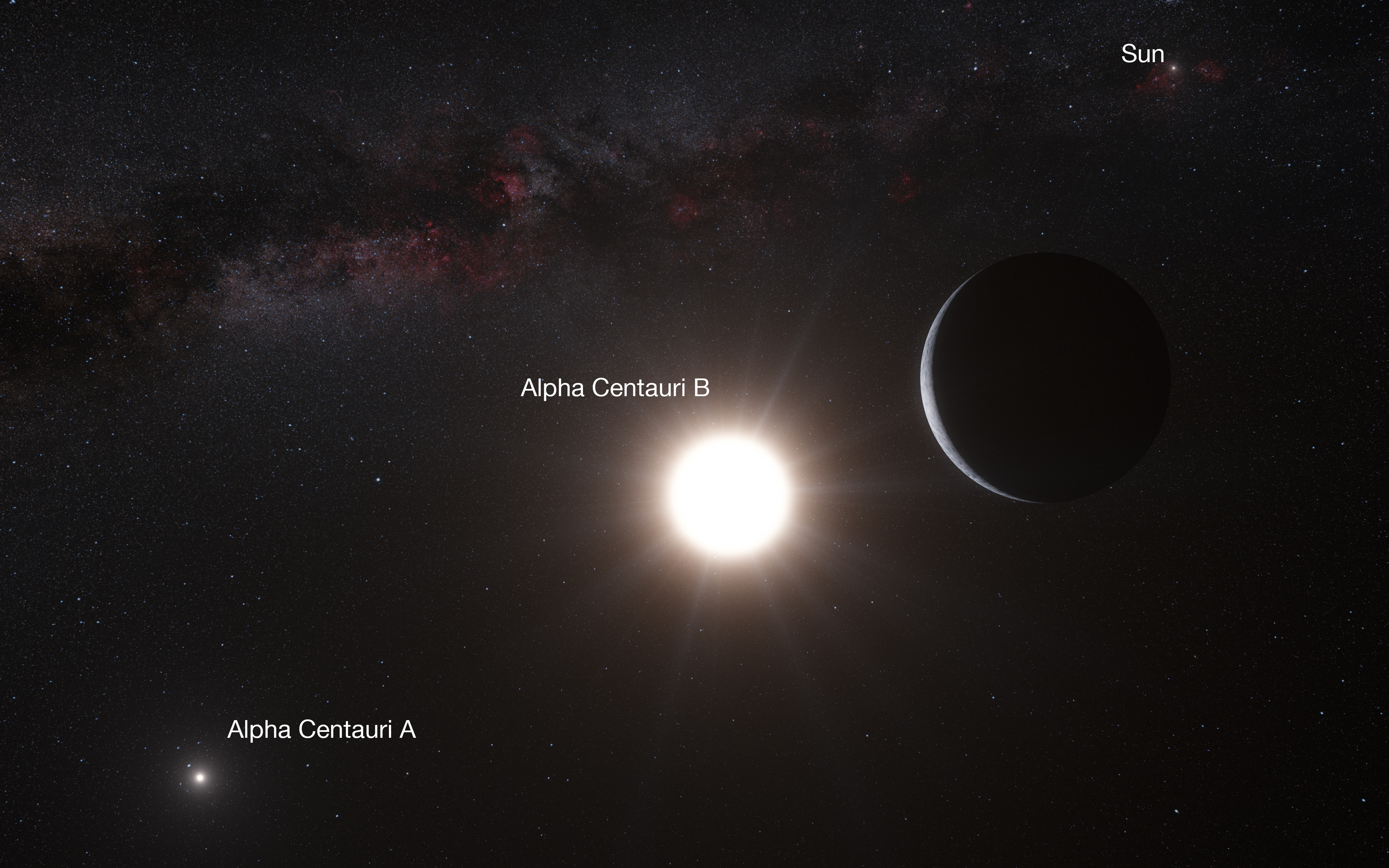
17 October 2012: scientists discover a new exoplanet (artist's impression pictured) orbiting Earth's nearest alien star, Alpha Centauri.

- 15 October
  - Astronomers have confirmed the existence of a Neptune-like exoplanet that has four suns, making it the first quadruple star system ever discovered.
  - September 2012 was tied as the warmest September ever recorded globally, according to data from the National Climatic Data Center.
  - New research clearly shows that there is an increasing tendency for cyclones to form when the climate is warmer, as it has been in recent years.
  - Researchers from North Carolina State University demonstrate new techniques for stretching carbon nanotubes to create carbon composites that can be used as stronger, lighter materials in a wide variety of applications.
  - NASA demonstrates its X1 powered exoskeleton, a robotic assistance suit based on its Robonaut humanoid robot. The X1 exoskeleton is designed to assist paraplegics with walking, and can also be set to provide walking exercise for non-disabled astronauts.
- 17 October
  - A new exoplanet is discovered orbiting Earth's closest stellar neighbour, Alpha Centauri. The new planet is believed to be too hot to sustain life, but there is a high probability that the system contains other planetary bodies, including potentially Earthlike ones.
  - Medical scientists report, on the basis of a decade-long double-blind study involving nearly 15,000 older male physicians, that subjects taking a daily multivitamin were associated with 8 percent fewer cancers compared to subjects taking a placebo.
  - A drug made from a plant known as "thunder god vine," or lei gong teng, that has long been used in traditional Chinese medicine, wipes out pancreatic tumors in mice, and may soon be tested in humans.
  - 83% of Madagascar's palms are threatened with extinction, putting the livelihoods of local people at risk, according to the latest update of the Red List of Threatened Species released today by the International Union for Conservation of Nature (IUCN).
- 18 October
  - A kidney-like organ grown from scratch in a laboratory has been shown to work in animals – an achievement that could lead to the production of spare kidneys for patients from their own stem cells.
  - Extinctions during the early Triassic period left Earth a virtual wasteland due to extreme heat, a new study suggests.
  - Using a new imaging technique, based on the detection of calcium ions in neurons, neuroscientists have developed a way to monitor how brain cells coordinate with each other to control specific behaviors.
  - For the first time, an assembly of nanomachines has been synthesised that is capable of producing a coordinated contraction, similar to the movements of biological muscle fibres.
- 19 October – The European Space Agency announces that it will launch a new satellite in 2017 to study super-Earths and other large exoplanets orbiting nearby stars. The CHaracterising ExOPlanets Satellite (CHEOPS) will orbit the Earth at an altitude of about 500 miles (800 km).

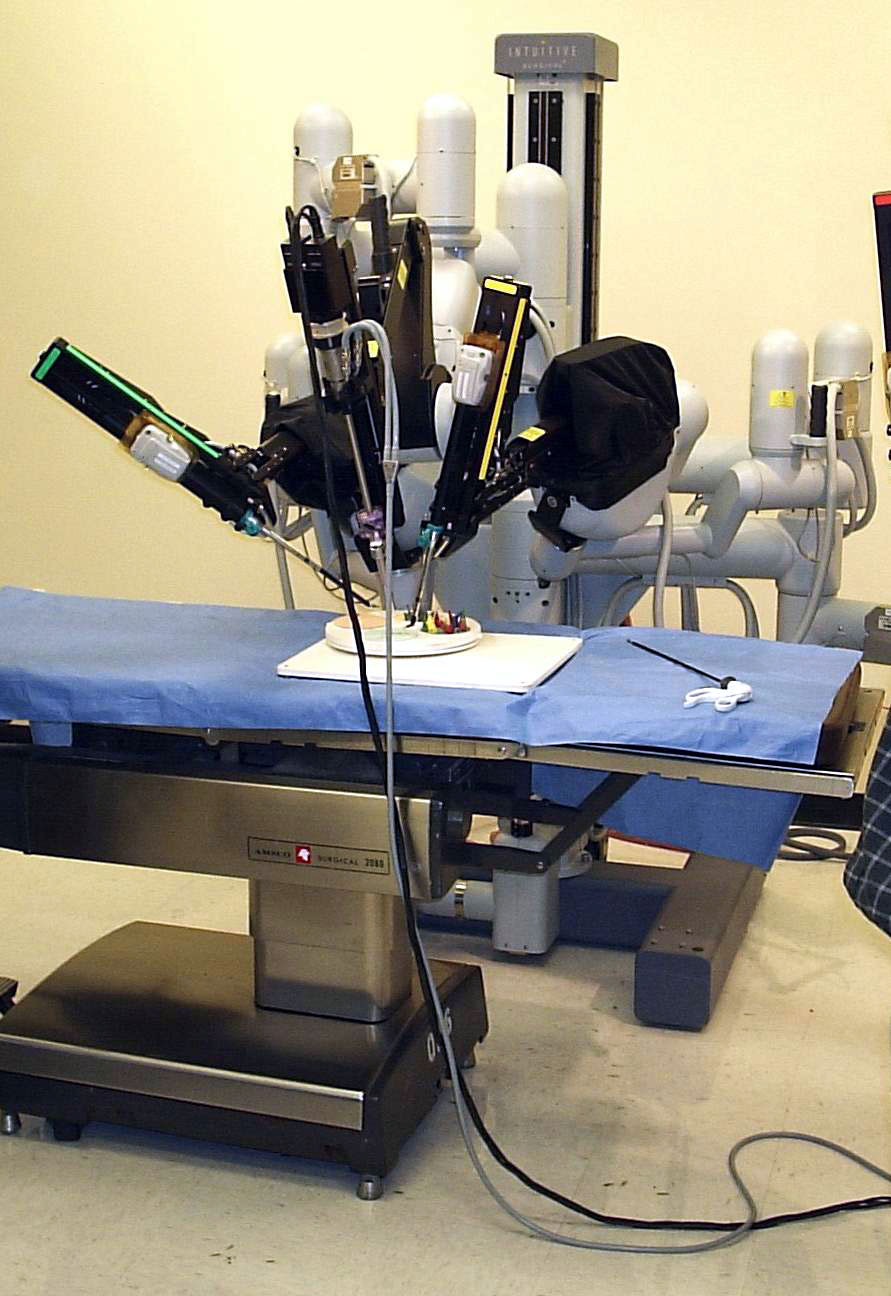
22 October 2012: a Da Vinci surgical robot (pictured) is used to perform the UK's first robot-assisted open-heart surgery.

- 22 October
  - Engineers develop an ultra-high-density form of magnetic tape, using barium ferrite particles to store up to 100 terabytes of data in a single tape cartridge. The invention is intended to store the huge volumes of astronomical data that the Square Kilometre Array will generate upon its inception in 2024.
  - British doctors use the remote-controlled Da Vinci Surgical System to perform the UK's first robotic open-heart surgery.
- 24 October
  - As much as 44 billion tons of nitrogen and 850 billion tons of carbon stored in Arctic permafrost could be released over the next century, according to a new study led by the U.S. Geological Survey. This is roughly the amount of carbon already stored in the atmosphere today.
  - Binge drinking – drinking less during the week and more on the weekends – significantly reduces the structural integrity of the adult brain, according to a new study.
  - A new gene therapy method to prevent the inheritance of certain genetic diseases has been successfully demonstrated in human cells. It is believed that this research, along with other efforts, will pave the way for future clinical trials in human subjects.
  - The world's first commercial vertical farm opens in Singapore. The farm maximizes its growing space by using 120 high-rise cultivation towers, and can produce half a ton of vegetables a day.
- 25 October – Microsoft launches Windows 8, the most fundamental update to its Windows operating system in 17 years.
- 26 October
  - The oldest Mayan tomb yet discovered is found in Guatemala. The ancient tomb is believed to date back to between 400 BC and 700 BC.
  - Scientists have recovered the sounds of music and laughter from the oldest playable American recording, dating back to 1878.
- 27 October – Women who give up smoking by the age of 30 will almost completely evade the risks of dying young from tobacco-related diseases, according to a study of more than a million women.
- 28 October
  - The uncrewed SpaceX Dragon spacecraft successfully completes its first fully operational resupply mission to the International Space Station (ISS), landing intact in the Pacific Ocean after over two weeks docked with the ISS.
  - British scientists invent a simple liquid-based test that can accurately diagnose diseases such as cancer or HIV by detecting small concentrations of biomarkers such as anomalous proteins.
  - IBM researchers demonstrate the initial steps toward commercial fabrication of carbon nanotubes as a successor to silicon-based electronics.
- 30 October
  - Britain's first 4G mobile network is launched, offering high-speed mobile data services in 11 major cities.
  - NASA scientists report that the Curiosity Mars rover has performed the first X-ray diffraction analysis of Martian soil at the "Rocknest" site. The results from the rover's CheMin analyzer revealed the presence of several minerals, including feldspar, pyroxenes and olivine, and suggested that the Martian soil in the sample was similar to the "weathered basaltic soils" of Hawaiian volcanoes.
  - IBM's Watson supercomputer is to help train doctors at a medical school in Cleveland, Ohio.
  - Amonix, a leading designer and manufacturer of concentrator photovoltaic (CPV) solar power, has achieved a milestone in the industry by successfully converting more than a third of sunlight into electricity. Its figure of 33.5% efficiency broke the previous record of 30.3%.
  - Pollen counts in the US will be more than double today's level by 2040, according to a new study.
- 31 October – Scientists in the Netherlands have demonstrated a form of self-healing concrete that uses limestone-producing bacteria.

=== November ===
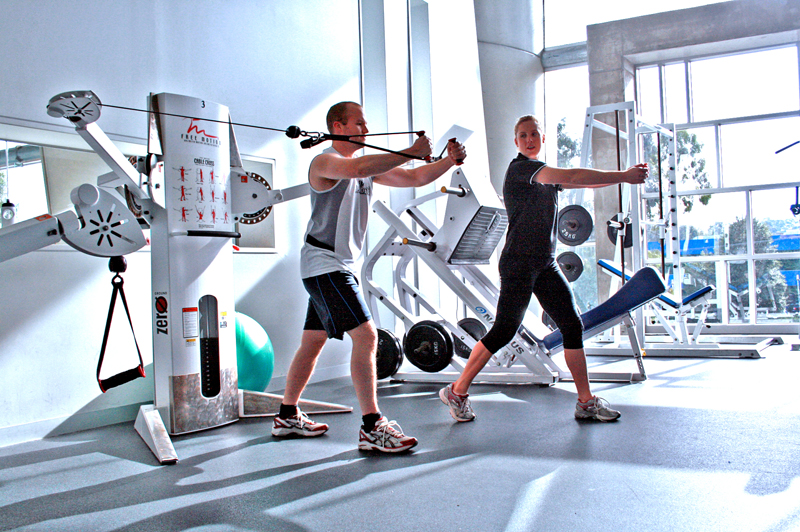
6 November 2012: scientists report that regular leisure-time exercise can extend human life expectancy by over 4 years.

- 1 November
  - Climate scientists are biased not toward "alarmism" (as the media often claims), but rather the reverse: toward cautious and conservative estimates, according to a new study.
  - A gene that is associated with regeneration of injured nerve cells has been identified by scientists at Penn State University and Duke University.
  - China announces plans to construct the world's first 100-petaflop supercomputer by 2015.
  - Sea levels are rising faster than expected from global warming, due to critical feedbacks missing from earlier models, according to the University of Colorado.
  - China reveals its second prototype stealth fighter, the J-13, which is a smaller and faster version of the existing Chengdu J-20.
- 2 November – Glybera becomes the first gene therapy approved by regulatory authorities in the Western world. Commercial roll-out is expected in late 2013.
- 5 November
  - New research suggests that just one or two individual herpes virus particles attack a skin cell in the first stage of an outbreak, resulting in a bottleneck in which the infection may be vulnerable to medical treatment.
  - A 15-year research project has succeeded in curbing the growth of polycystic kidney disease, one of the most common life-threatening genetic diseases, which affects 12.5 million people worldwide. Previously, only the symptoms of the disease could be treated.
  - A report in the November 6 issue of Current Biology offers the first complete description of the spade-toothed whale (Mesoplodon traversii), a species previously known only from a few bones. The description is based on two individuals – an adult female and her male calf – who became stranded and died on a New Zealand beach in 2010.
- 6 November
  - University of Bonn scientists develop a soccer-playing robot called NimbRo-OP, intended to develop new capabilities for humanoid bipedal robots, such as using tools, climbing stairs, and using human facial expressions, gestures and body language for communication.
  - Targeting a single chemical inside cancerous cells could one day lead to a single test for a broad range of cancers, researchers say. The same system could then be used to deliver precision radiotherapy treatments.
  - In the largest ever study of its kind, an international team of astronomers establishes that the rate of star formation in the universe is now only 1/30th of its peak, and that this decline is set to continue.
  - Leisure-time physical activity extends life expectancy by as much as 4.5 years, according to a study by the National Cancer Institute. Even half of the recommended weekly exercise can add 1.8 years.
- 7 November
  - Canadian researchers working to develop the world's first HIV vaccine have cleared a major hurdle. Initial results from a Phase I trial have shown no adverse effects, while significantly boosting immunity. The vaccine could be commercially available in five years.
  - Human diseases could soon be modeled in an electronic "organ-on-a-chip", with a new generation of research to replace animal testing.
  - Astronomers report that HD 40307 g, a super-Earth exoplanet 42 light-years away from Earth, is within the habitable zone of its host star HD 40307 and may be "just right to support life".
  - Rising temperatures due to climate change could mean wild arabica coffee becomes extinct within 70 years, posing a risk to the genetic sustainability of one of the world's basic commodities, according to new research.
- 8 November
  - Due to insufficient rates of decarbonisation, the world is on track for 6 °C (43 °F) of climatic warming by the year 2100, according to a new report.
  - Scientists debate the scientific basis and claims to novelty of a proposal to use the orbital angular momentum of light and radio waves to massively boost wireless data transfer.
  - MIT engineers develop a hearing aid battery which uses ions within the human inner ear to provide a steady electric current.
  - Nao robots are used to teach autistic primary school children in a groundbreaking trial in the UK.
  - University of Washington scientists have succeeded in removing the extra copy of chromosome 21 in cell cultures derived from a person with Down syndrome, a condition in which the body's cells contain three copies of chromosome 21 rather than the usual pair.
  - American climatologists report that the record-breaking 2012 North American drought continues to worsen, with over 19% of the contiguous United States suffering from extreme drought, and groundwater levels declining nationwide.
- 9 November
  - The United States Army develops a tactical 3D printing capability to allow it to rapidly manufacture critical components on the battlefield.
  - Microsoft demonstrates software that translates spoken English into Chinese while preserving the speaker's intonation.
- 11 November – Scientists develop a highly efficient metamaterial cloaking device capable of rendering objects invisible to microwaves.
- 12 November
  - The American Titan machine is declared the world's most powerful supercomputer, capable of performing 17.59 quadrillion floating point operations per second. Overall, the United States has the most supercomputers listed in the global top 500, with 251; China is in second place, with 72.
  - The Large Hadron Collider detects an extremely rare particle decay event, casting doubt on the popular theory of supersymmetry.
- 13 November
  - A total solar eclipse occurs.
  - A longevity gene is found which makes the Hydra vulgaris virtually immortal, and could extend human lifespans.
  - Physicists conduct the first quantum teleportation from one macroscopic object to another, potentially allowing the development of quantum routers and a quantum Internet.
- 14 November
  - An international team of researchers discovers a gene that helps explain how humans evolved from chimpanzees. Scientists say the gene – called miR-941 – appears to have played a crucial role in human brain development, and may shed light on how humans learned to use tools and language.
  - Even moderate drinking in pregnancy can affect a child's IQ, according to a new study using data from over 4,000 mothers and their children.
  - A gene that nearly triples the risk of Alzheimer's disease has been discovered by an international team including researchers from Mayo Clinic. It is the most potent genetic risk factor for Alzheimer's identified in the past 20 years.
  - Scientists sequence the genome of the domestic pig. The similarities between the pig and human genomes mean that the new data may have wide applications in the study and treatment of human genetic diseases.
  - Astronomers discover a wandering, starless rogue planet drifting through space around 100 light-years from Earth.
  - Researchers at the American National Institute of Standards and Technology (NIST) prove that single-wall carbon nanotubes may help protect DNA molecules from damage by oxidation.
- 15 November
  - Scientists warn that the lethal ebola virus can spread between species as an aerosol. However, they emphasize that these aerosol particles can only travel short distances.
  - An efficient, high-volume technique for testing potential drug treatments for Alzheimer's disease has uncovered an organic compound that restored motor function and longevity to fruit flies with the disease.
  - New artificial muscles made from nanotech yarns and infused with paraffin wax can lift more than 100,000 times their own weight, and generate 85 times more mechanical power than the natural muscle of the same dimensions, according to scientists.
  - If global temperatures were to rise just 1 degree Celsius, the Bhutanese glaciers would shrink by 25 percent and produce 65 percent less annual melt water, according to research published in Geophysical Research Letters.
  - The United States Navy announces plans to replace its trained minesweeping dolphins with robotic submarines such as the Knifefish by 2017.
- 16 November
  - Rat heart cells are used by University of Illinois scientists to power tiny, crawling "bio-robots".
  - New research has identified a common gene variant which influences when a person wakes up each day, as well as the time of day they are most likely to die.
- 18 November – A biodegradable nanoparticle has been developed which can stealthily deliver an antigen, tricking the immune system into stopping its attack on myelin and preventing multiple sclerosis in mice.
- 19 November
  - Scientists report a huge decline in UK birdlife – from 210 million nesting birds in 1966, down to 166 million in 2012.
  - Cambridge University scientists heal paralyzed dogs by injecting them with cells grown from their nasal linings. Many of the 23 injured dogs treated with the experimental therapy regained some use of their legs even 12 months after their injury, and scientists believe that human patients could be treated in a similar fashion.
  - A new tumor-tracking technique may improve outcomes for lung cancer patients.
  - IBM researchers have simulated 530 billion neurons and 100 trillion synapses on a supercomputer.

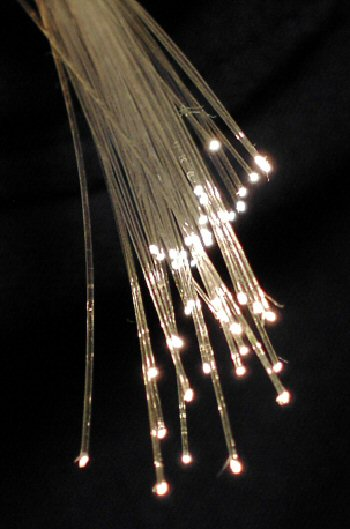
21 November 2012: in a breakthrough for quantum cryptography, scientists send encoded quantum signals using a standard commercial fiber optic, potentially allowing near-unbreakable quantum data security to be commercialised.

- 20 November
  - NASA scientists report (via an NPR interview) that the Curiosity Mars rover, apparently based on a SAM analysis, has provided, according to John Grotzinger (MSL Principal Investigator), "data that is gonna be one for the history books. It's looking really good." Later, a NASA spokesperson said the discovery "won't be earthshaking, but it will be interesting." Nonetheless, the scientists are presently verifying their results and expect to make an official announcement at the fall meeting of the American Geophysical Union, which will take place between 3 December and 7 December in San Francisco, according to Grotzinger in an interview with Space.com. The news is later played down by NASA.
  - More than 1,000 coal-fired power plants are being planned worldwide, new research from the World Resources Institute has revealed, with the majority being constructed in China and India.
  - The level of greenhouse gases in the atmosphere reached 390.9 parts per million in 2011, a new record high, according to the World Meteorological Organization. Between 1990 and 2011, there was a 30% increase in radiative forcing.
  - Physicists have shown that synthetic membrane channels can be constructed through "DNA nanotechnology."
  - Scientists have developed a computer chip that mimics a dog's nose. It is capable of rapidly identifying trace amounts of vapour molecules, providing continuous real-time monitoring at concentrations of just 1 part per billion (ppb).
- 21 November
  - For the first time, encrypted quantum signals are successfully sent down a conventional broadband fiber, instead of requiring a dedicated individual cable. This development could allow quantum cryptography, which offers near-impenetrable data security, to become available to the general public.
  - The effects of climate change are already evident in Europe and the situation is set to get worse, the European Environment Agency has warned.
  - A United Nations report – the Emissions Gap Report 2012 – says global attempts to limit CO_{2} emissions are falling well short of what is needed to stem dangerous climate change.
  - For the first time, scientists at Fred Hutchinson Cancer Research Center have defined key events that take place early in the process of cellular aging. They have shown that the acidity of the vacuole is critical to aging and the stable functioning of mitochondria.
  - The printing of 3D tissue has taken a major step forward with the creation of a novel hybrid printer that simplifies the process of creating implantable cartilage.
  - European Space Agency (ESA) member states agree at their ministerial council to a 10.1-billion-euro programme of activities, including a planned upgrade to the Ariane 5 rocket.
- 23 November
  - Footprints believed to have been made by the giant flightless bird Diatryma indicate that it was a "gentle herbivore" and not a fierce carnivore, scientists say.
  - Having a job with poor working conditions can be just as bad for a person's mental health as being unemployed, according to new research published in Psychological Medicine.
- 25 November
  - A Chinese Shenyang J-15 jet fighter conducts the first landing on the country's first aircraft carrier, the Liaoning. This milestone marks a major step forward in China's efforts to increase its naval power.
  - Pathological changes typical of Alzheimer's disease have been significantly reduced in mice by blockade of an immune system transmitter.

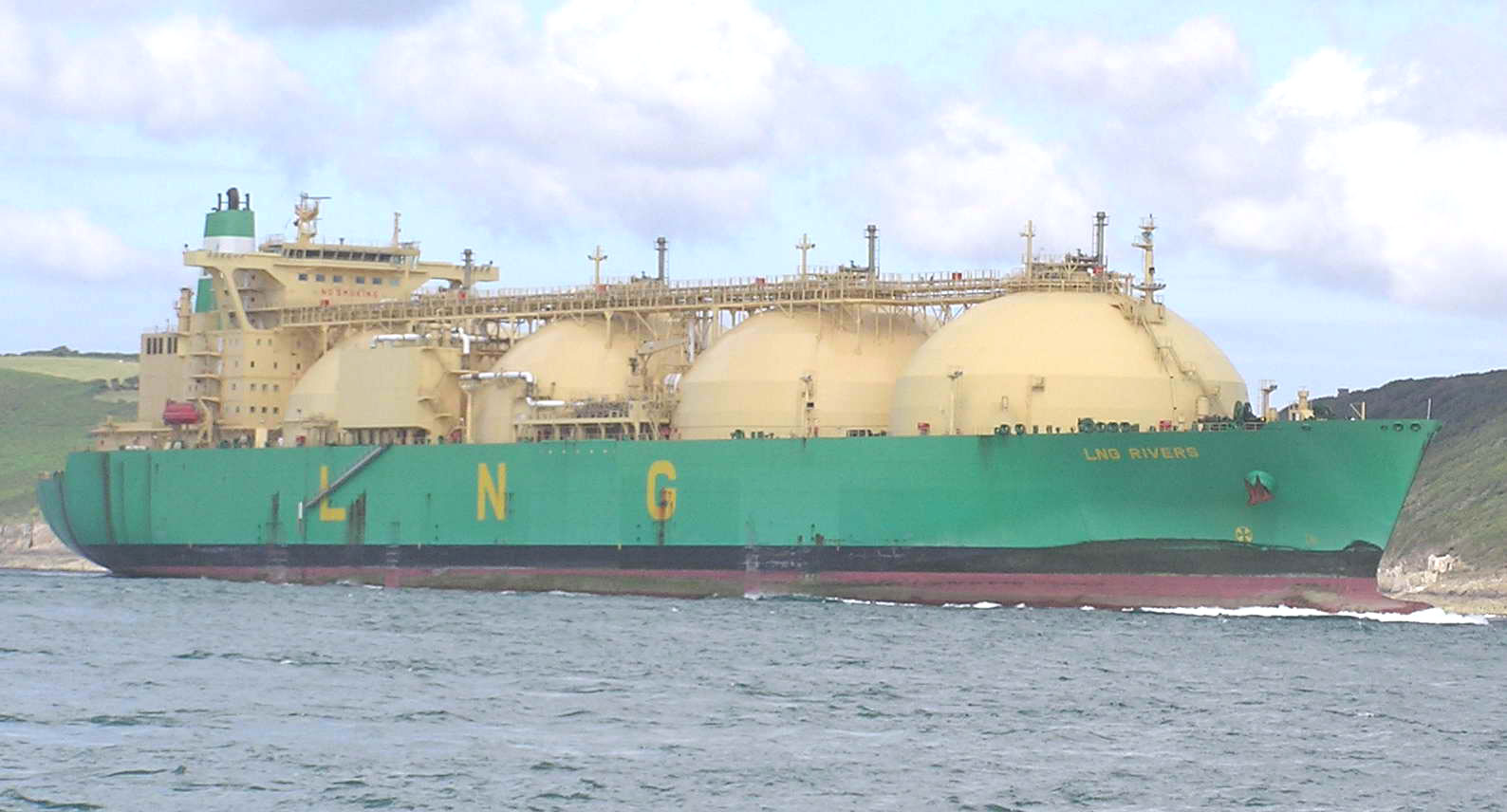
26 November 2012: a liquid natural gas tanker (example pictured) becomes the first large cargo vessel to attempt a winter crossing of the Arctic. As the Arctic sea ice melts in coming years, the sea route may become increasingly viable for large ships.

- 26 November
  - A Norwegian liquid natural gas tanker becomes the first ship of its size to attempt a winter crossing of the Arctic. As Arctic ice cover reduces due to climate change, the Arctic sea route may become increasingly viable for large ships.
  - Researchers, including NASA scientists and engineers from Los Alamos National Laboratory, have demonstrated a new concept for a reliable nuclear reactor that could be used on space flights. The Demonstration Using Flattop Fissions (DUFF) experiment produced 24 watts of electricity.
- 27 November
  - Permafrost covering almost a quarter of the Northern Hemisphere contains 1.7 trillion tonnes of carbon, twice that currently in the atmosphere, and could significantly amplify global warming should thawing accelerate as expected, according to a new report released today by the United Nations Environment Programme (UNEP).
  - A review reveals that grapefruit drug interactions affects even more than previously though, with the list of drugs with potentially serious interactions more than doubling since 2012. Users of heart medication are particularly vulnerable.
- 28 November
  - The Reaction Engines Skylon spaceplane project achieves a key engine design milestone.
  - Astronomers observe a penumbral lunar eclipse.
  - Previous estimates of sea level rise have been underestimated, while estimates of global temperature rises appear to be accurate, according to a new study published in the journal Environmental Research Letters.
  - A completely new method of manufacturing the smallest structures in electronics could make their manufacture thousands of times quicker, allowing for cheaper semiconductors. The findings have been published in the latest issue of Nature.
  - Scientists have achieved a major breakthrough in deciphering bread wheat's genetic code. This could lead to new varieties that are more productive and better able to cope with disease, drought and other stresses that cause crop losses.
  - American engineers build a 3D printer capable of manufacturing tools from lunar regolith, potentially allowing future astronauts to manufacture equipment on-site using lunar or Martian rock.
  - Vanderbilt University engineers develop a lightweight powered exoskeleton, which technology company Parker Hannifin plans to release commercially for those with paraplegia in 2014.

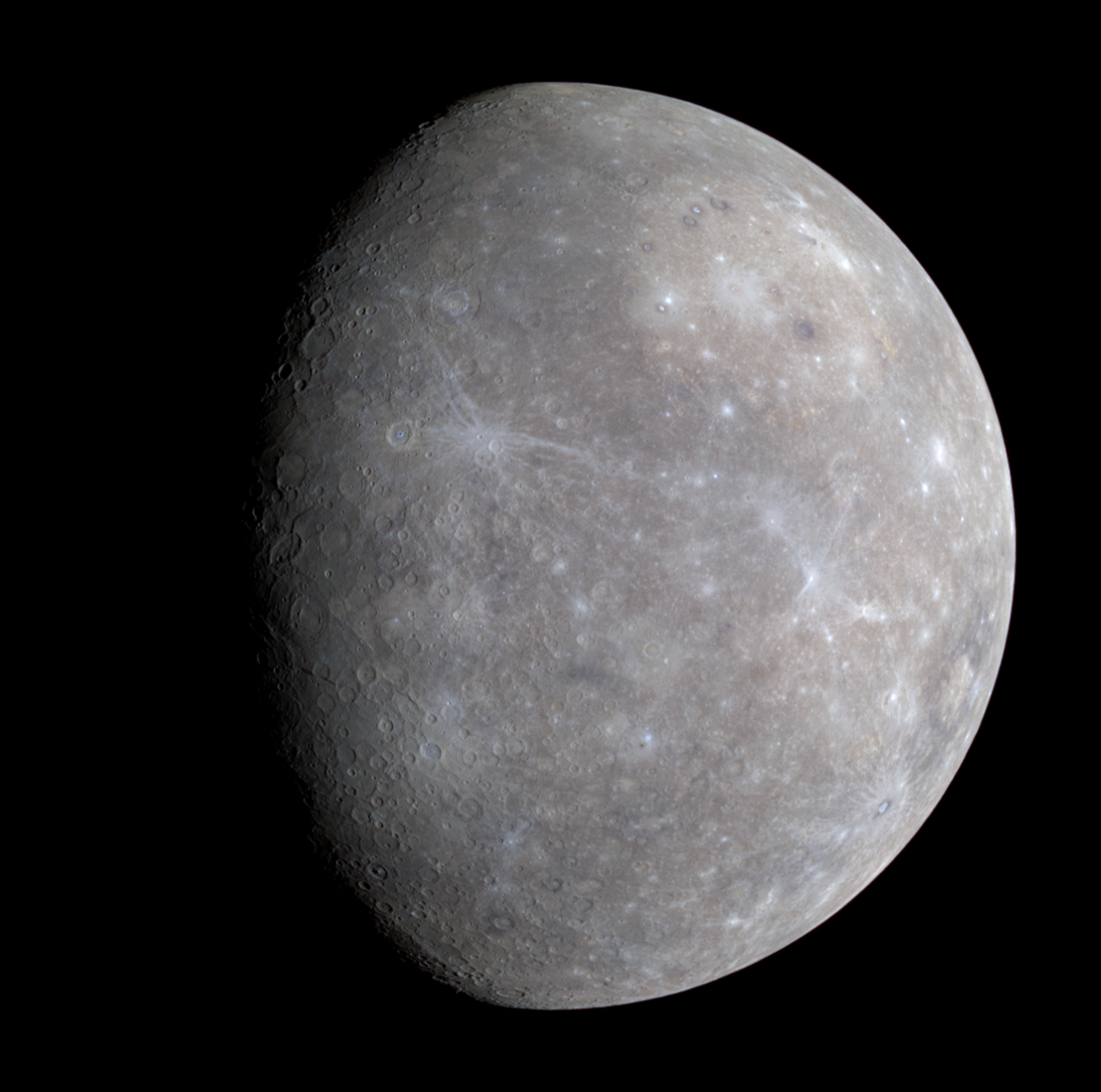
29 November 2012: NASA reports the discovery of water ice on the surface of Mercury (pictured).

- 29 November
  - Scientists discover the second-largest supermassive black hole ever detected, with a mass 17 billion times that of the Sun. However, the black hole resides in an anomalously small galaxy.
  - NASA reports that its MESSENGER probe has discovered water ice and organic compounds on the surface of Mercury.
  - Experts have combined data from multiple satellites and aircraft to produce the most comprehensive and accurate assessment to date of ice sheet losses in Greenland and Antarctica and their contributions to sea level rise. Ice sheet loss at both poles is increasing, the study finds.
  - A study published in Nature states that human genetic variation has accelerated rapidly in recent centuries, faster than natural selection can operate.
- 30 November
  - British scientists develop a method of safely cultivating medicinal stem cells from the blood of adult patients, potentially allowing each patient to have a personalised source of stem cells.
  - Italian scientists publish the first direct images of DNA, which were produced using a scanning electron microscope. The images provide photographic proof of DNA's double-helix structure, and could further scientific understanding of the compound's function.
  - At the Euromold trade show in Germany, manufacturers display numerous advances in commercial 3D printing technology, including a device that can rapidly print an entire bicycle.
  - MIT researchers develop a protein-inspired modular robot capable of magnetically folding itself into a wide variety of shapes, potentially heralding future devices that can reconfigure themselves for nearly any purpose.

=== December ===
- 1 December – The United States government announces the first major offering of Atlantic coastal sites for offshore wind farm developments. Around 432 square miles (1,120 km^{2}) will be sold off in 2013.
- 2 December
  - Researchers state that they have identified the point of origin of the genes that later enabled human thought and reasoning. This development, 500 million years ago, later granted humans the ability to learn complex skills, analyse situations and think flexibly.
  - Global carbon dioxide emissions are projected to have risen further in 2012, reaching a new record high of 35.6 billion tonnes, according to figures from the Global Carbon Project.
- 3 December – NASA reports that its Curiosity Mars rover has performed its first extensive soil analysis, revealing the presence of water molecules, sulfur and chlorine in the Martian soil.
- 4 December
  - A British energy firm announces plans to construct Africa's largest solar energy plant in Ghana.
  - NASA announces that it plans to launch another robotic Mars rover in 2020, following the success of its Curiosity rover.
  - Using a simple "drag-and-drop" computer interface and DNA self-assembly techniques, researchers have developed a new approach for drug development that could drastically reduce the time required to create and test medications.
  - Besse Cooper, the world's oldest living human and the last surviving person born in 1896, dies aged 116.

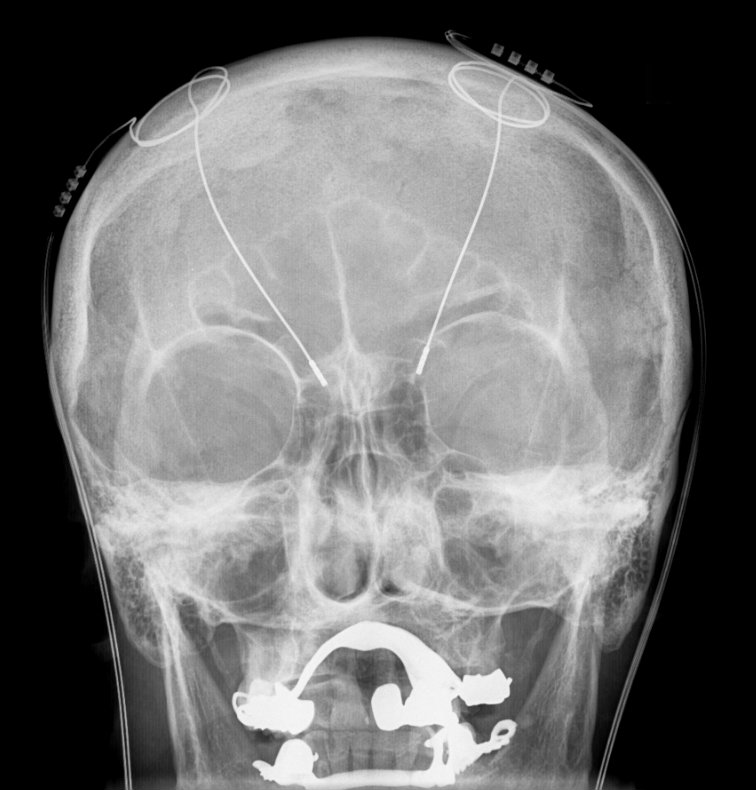
5 December 2012: scientists implant the first deep brain stimulation device (X-ray image pictured) to be used for the treatment of Alzheimer's disease in the United States.

- 5 December
  - Paleontologists announce the discovery of what is likely to be the oldest known dinosaur. Nyasasaurus parringtoni is believed to have lived 10-15 million years before the previous earliest known dinosaur specimens.
  - Liquid Robotics' autonomous Wave Glider nautical robot completes a record-breaking voyage from San Francisco to Australia. The data-gathering robot, powered by solar panels and wave energy, survived storms and shark attacks during its year-long journey.
  - In the first such operation in the United States, medical researchers implant a pacemaker-like device into the brain of an Alzheimer's disease patient in the early stages of the disease. The device, which provides deep brain stimulation and has already been used by those with Parkinson's disease, could boost memory and reverse cognitive decline.
  - A Belgian team develops a curved LCD contact lens display. Researchers say the prototype could be used in medicine, or lead to adaptable "in-eye" sunglasses.
- 6 December
  - The Golden Spike Company announces plans for commercial lunar expeditions by 2020, with flights to the Moon starting at around $750 million per person.
  - Scientists identify the mechanism that allows Toxoplasma gondii – a single-celled parasite – to pass from the human gut to the brain, where it may cause suicidal thoughts and risk-taking.
- 7 December
  - An interactive map showing the location of every German bomb dropped on London during World War II is created.
  - A young British girl successfully receives a pioneering bone replacement treatment to restore her damaged spine. The operation, the first of its kind ever attempted in Europe, used bone taken from the child's legs to replace her lower vertebrae, which were missing due to a rare and potentially lethal genetic condition.
  - NASA's Opportunity Mars rover discovers clay-bearing deposits on the surface of Mars, indicating the past presence of liquid water.
  - A new study shows that with "near perfect sensitivity", anatomical brain images alone can accurately diagnose chronic ADHD, schizophrenia, Tourette syndrome, bipolar disorder, or familial risks for major depression.
- 8 December – The 1997 Kyoto Protocol on the limitation of greenhouse gas emissions is extended until 2020, having previously been set to expire by the end of 2012.
- 9 December – French Polynesia establishes the world's largest shark sanctuary, protecting all shark species from fishing in an area of 4.7 million square kilometres.
- 10 December
  - The first close-up footage of the Sunda clouded leopard, one of the rarest cat species on Earth, is released.
  - Scientists succeed in making the skin cells of older people act like younger cells again, simply by adding more filler to the fiber-filled area around the cells.
  - Researchers create a shape-shifting metamaterial that could revolutionise the treatment of wounds. The liquid material could be infused with drugs, then shaped to fit perfectly inside a wound.
- 11 December
  - The United States Air Force launches its robotic Boeing X-37 spaceplane on its third classified long-duration mission.
  - Numerous major Japanese companies, including Mitsubishi, demonstrate new specialist robots for cleaning up the Fukushima Daiichi nuclear disaster.
- 12 December
  - North Korea conducts its first successful orbital launch, placing the Kwangmyŏngsŏng-3 satellite into low Earth orbit.
  - Astronomers report that the most distant known galaxy, UDFj-39546284, is now estimated to be even further away than previously believed. The galaxy, which is estimated to have formed around "380 million years" after the Big Bang (about 13.75 billion years ago), is approximately 13.37 billion light years from Earth.
  - DARPA announces funding for a medical foam technology that can rapidly staunch severe internal bleeding on the battlefield.
- 13 December
  - Scientists identify a new species of primate, the slow loris Nycticebus kayan, which is found to have a toxic bite.
  - China's uncrewed Chang'e 2 probe successfully performs a close flyby of the asteroid 4179 Toutatis, in the first such attempt by a Chinese spacecraft.
  - Physicists report the constancy, over space and time, of a basic physical constant of nature that supports the Standard Model of physics. The scientists, studying methanol molecules in a distant galaxy, found the change (∆μ/μ) in the proton-to-electron mass ratio μ to be equal to "(0.0 ± 1.0) × 10−7 at redshift z = 0.89" and consistent with "a null result".
- 14 December – British researchers partially sequence the genome of a fast-spreading fungus that is killing off ash trees across Europe.
- 16 December – American scientists use a genetically modified virus to partially convert the heart muscle of guinea pigs into cells which govern the heart's rhythm, effectively creating a biological pacemaker. If this development can be applied to humans, heart conditions could be treated without the need for expensive medical implants and their attendant maintenance surgeries.
- 17 December
  - Researchers at the University of Pittsburgh develop a robotic arm that can be precisely controlled by paralyzed patients using a set of motor cortex implants.
  - NASA's twin GRAIL lunar satellites deorbit and are intentionally crashed into the surface of the Moon, marking the end of their year-long gravity research mission.
  - The Terrafugia Transition flying car begins flight certification tests, in preparation for its planned commercial release in 2013.
- 19 December
  - Astronomers report that the nearby star Tau Ceti hosts five exoplanets, including one world believed to be within the star's habitable zone.
  - The final orbital spaceflight of 2012 occurs, marking the 72nd successful orbital launch of the year, and the 78th overall.
  - Chinese scientists discover fossil evidence which shows that the extinct elephant genus Palaeoloxodon survived in China until as recently as 1,000 BC. The genus was previously believed to have disappeared by 8,000 BC.
- 20 December – NASA scientists release the latest WMAP results and an image of the very early universe. The nine-year WMAP data shows "13.772+/-0.059"-billion-year-old temperature fluctuations and a temperature range of ± 200 microKelvin. In addition, the study finds that 95 percent of the early universe is composed of dark matter and energy, the curvature of space is less than 0.4 percent of "flat", and the universe emerged from the cosmic Dark Ages "about 400 million years" after the Big Bang.
- 21 December
  - A "Trojan horse" therapy which uses viruses concealed within white blood cells to attack tumours is successfully used to eliminate prostate cancer in mice. However, human trials have yet to be conducted.
  - As predicted by scientists, 21 December 2012 passes without any form of apocalyptic event, despite years of global anticipation.

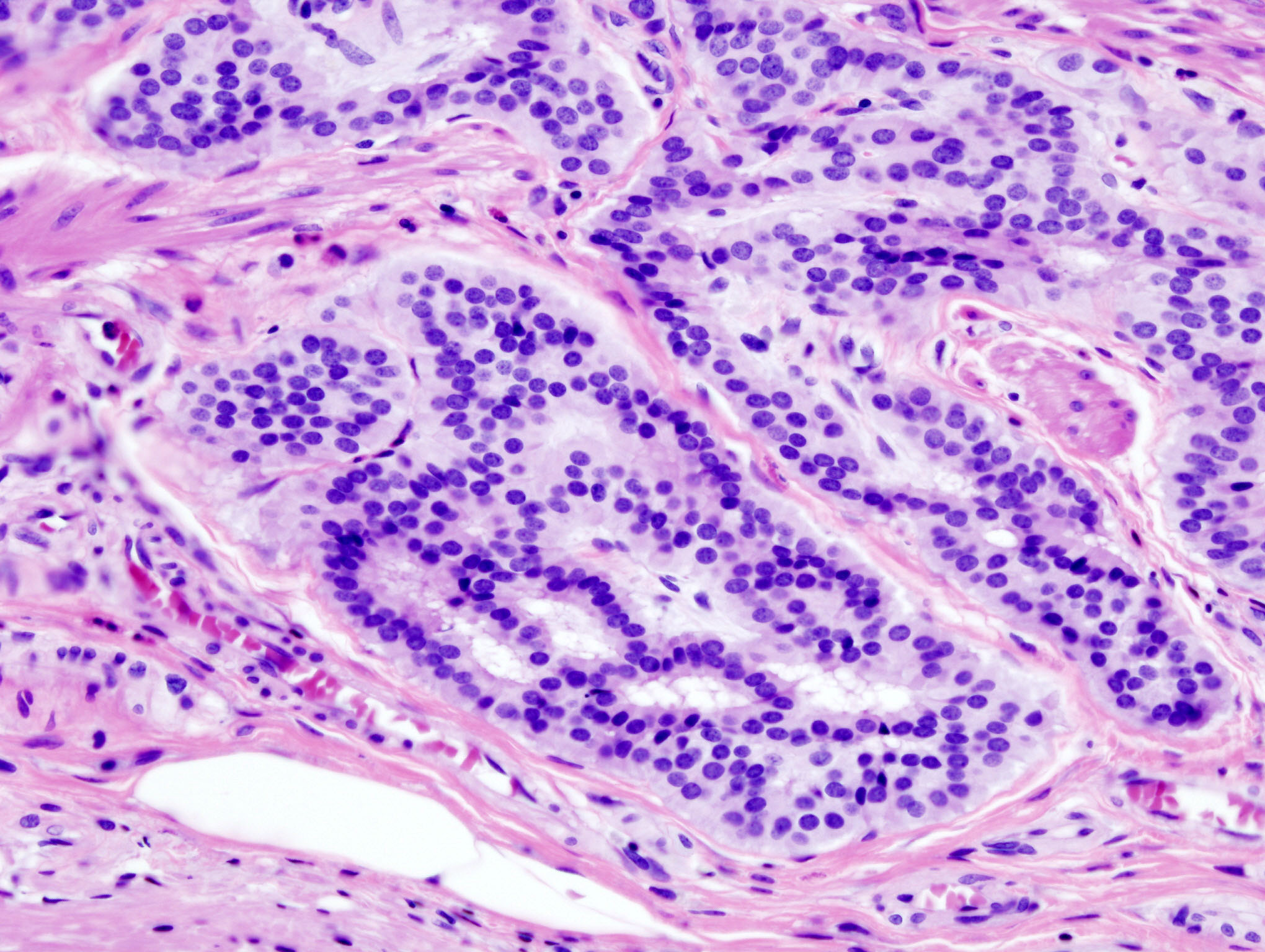
24 December 2012: British medical researchers discover two genes that are thought to greatly increase the risk of bowel cancer (carcinoid pictured).

- 24 December
  - Scientists analyse the genomes of individuals with a high familial risk of bowel cancer, and discover two flawed genes that may contribute to the disease.
  - American researchers report that their experiments with liquid crystals may yield future materials that can be directly controlled and re-shaped in real time.
- 26 December
  - The world's longest high-speed rail line enters operation in China. The 2,298-kilometre (1,428 mi) railway links Beijing with Guangzhou.
  - Tigers, having been on the verge of extinction, are now making a comeback in India and Thailand, according to the Wildlife Conservation Society.
- 28 December – Stanford University engineers publish a design for a future mission to the Martian moon Phobos, incorporating both an orbiting satellite and spherical surface rovers.
- 31 December – A NASA-supported study suggests that crewed spaceflight may harm the brains of astronauts and accelerate the onset of Alzheimer's disease.

== IISE Top 10 New Species ==
The Top 10 New Species 2013 was announced on 22 May 2013 by the International Institute for Species Exploration, commemorating unique species discovered during 2012. The ten selected new species were:

- Viola lilliputana
- Chondrocladia lyra
- Cercopithecus lomamiensis
- Sibon noalamina
- Ochroconis anomala
- Paedophryne amauensis
- Eugenia petrikensis
- Lucihormetica luckae
- Semachrysa jade
- Juracimbrophlebia ginkgofolia

== Prizes ==
=== Abel Prize ===
- 2012 Abel Prize: Endre Szemerédi

=== Fundamental Physics Prize ===
- 2012 Fundamental Physics Prize: Nima Arkani-Hamed, Alan Guth, Alexei Kitaev, Maxim Kontsevich, Andrei Linde, Juan Maldacena, Nathan Seiberg, Ashoke Sen and Edward Witten
- 2012 FPP special award: Stephen Hawking, Peter Jenni, Fabiola Gianotti, Michel Della Negra, Tejinder Singh Virdee, Guido Tonelli, Joe Incandela and Lyn Evans

=== Kyoto Prize ===
- 2012 Kyoto Prize in Advanced Technology: Ivan Sutherland
- 2012 Kyoto Prize in Basic Sciences: Yoshinori Ohsumi

=== Nobel Prize ===
- 2012 Nobel Prize in Physiology or Medicine: John B. Gurdon and Shinya Yamanaka
- 2012 Nobel Prize in Physics: Serge Haroche and David J. Wineland
- 2012 Nobel Prize in Chemistry: Robert J. Lefkowitz and Brian Kobilka

== Deaths ==
Sources: The Guardian and The Daily Telegraph

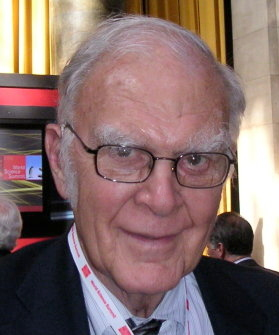
10 March 2012: Frank Sherwood Rowland, a Nobel Prize-winning American chemist, dies aged 84.

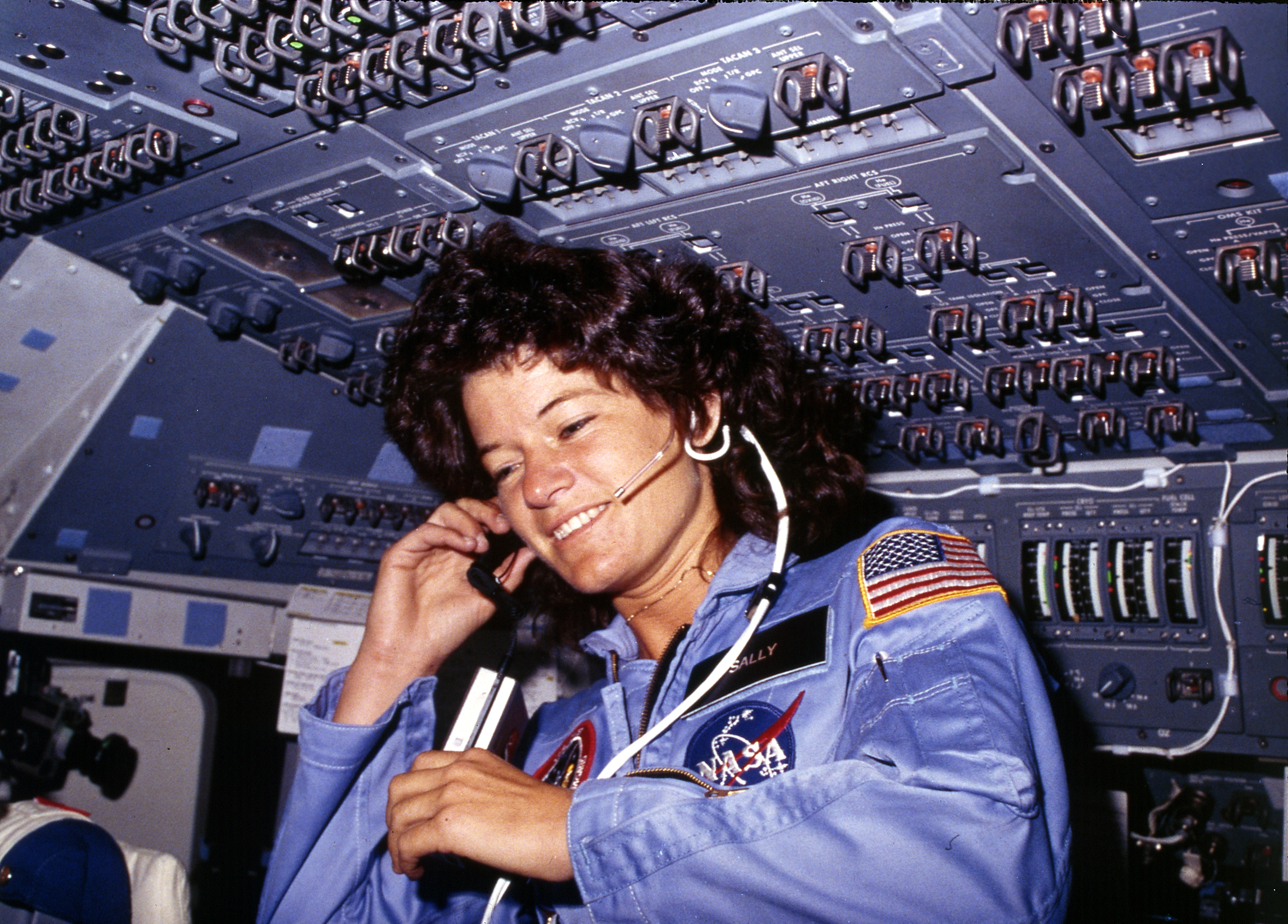
23 July 2012: Sally Ride, the first American woman in space, dies aged 61.

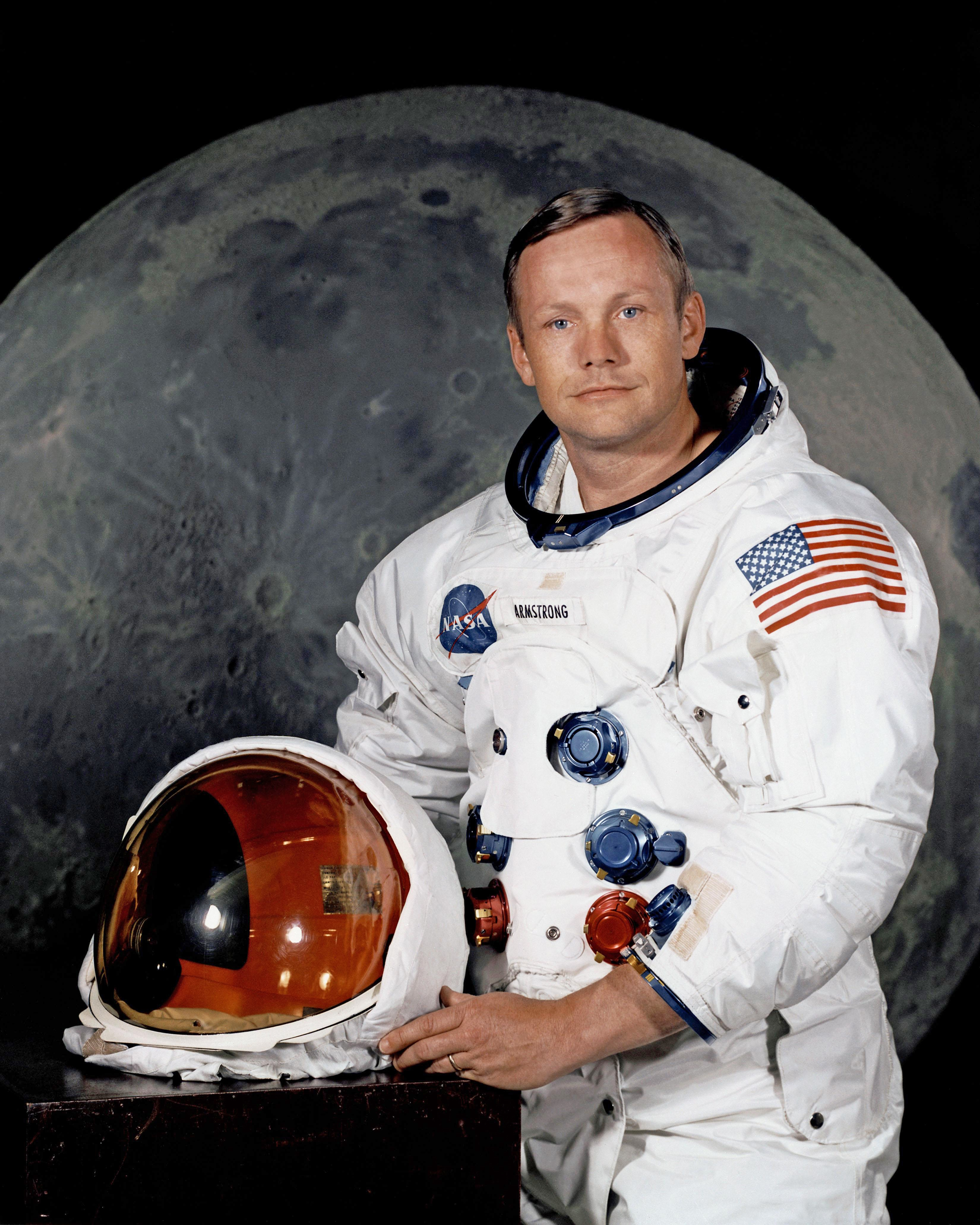
25 August 2012: Neil Armstrong, the first man to walk on the Moon, dies aged 82.

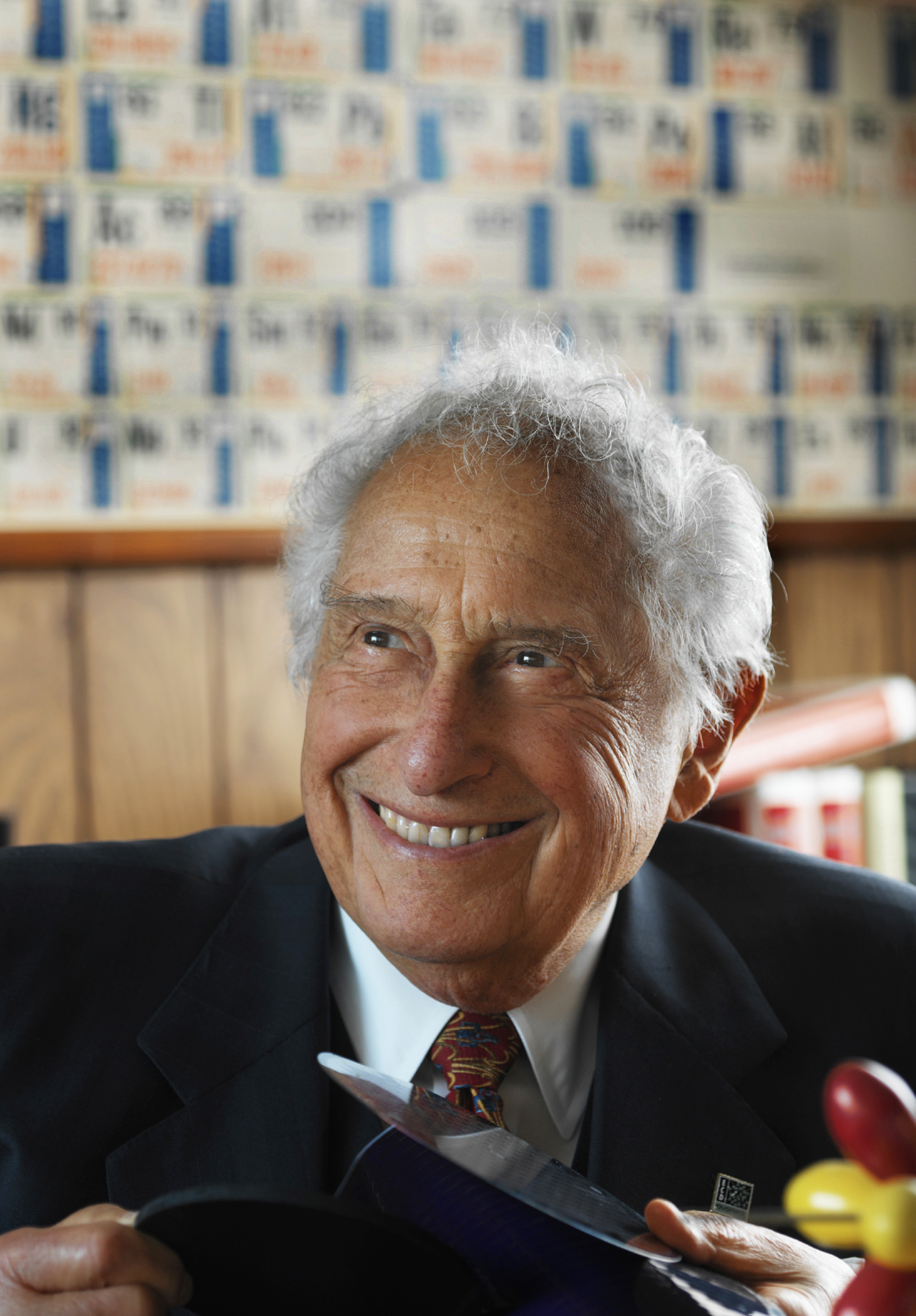
17 October 2012: Stanford Ovshinsky, a prolific American inventor and physicist, dies aged 89.

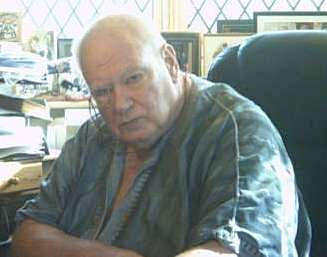
9 December 2012: Sir Patrick Moore, a prominent British astronomer and science popularizer, dies aged 89.

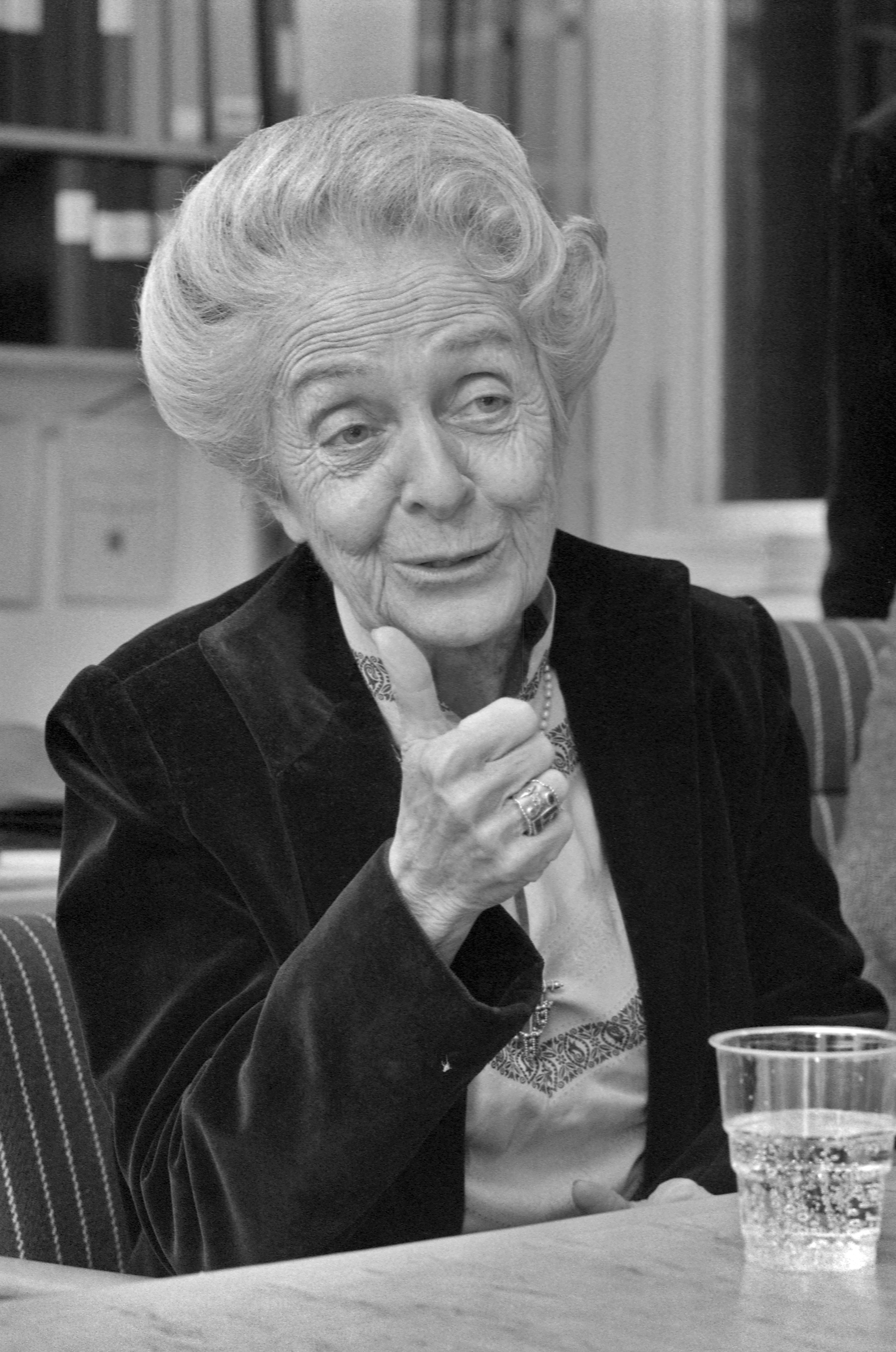
30 December 2012: Rita Levi-Montalcini, a Nobel Prize-winning Italian neurologist, dies aged 103.

=== January ===
- 3 January – James F. Crow, American geneticist (b. 1916).
- 6 January – Roger Boisjoly, American rocket engineer (b. 1938).
- 7 January – Herbert Wilf, American mathematician and academic (b. 1931)
- 12 January – Bjørn G. Andersen, Norwegian quaternary geologist (b. 1924).
- 21 January – Roy John Britten, American biologist and geneticist (b. 1919)

=== February ===
- 16 February – Donald Henry Colless, Australian entomologist (b. 1922).
- 19 February – Renato Dulbecco, Italian American virologist, winner of the 1975 Nobel Prize in Physiology or Medicine (b. 1914).
- 24 February – Oliver Wrong, British nephrologist (b. 1925).

=== March ===
- 10 March – Frank Sherwood Rowland, American atmospheric chemist, winner of the 1995 Nobel Prize in Chemistry (b. 1927).
- 24 March – Sir Paul Callaghan, New Zealand physicist (b. 1947).

=== April ===
- 8 April – Fang Lizhi, Chinese astrophysicist and political activist (b. 1936).
- 20 April – George Cowan, American chemist, Manhattan Project scientist and businessman (b. 1920).
- 29 April – Roland Moreno, Egyptian-born French inventor of the smart card, Légion d'honneur recipient (b. 1945).

=== May ===
- 12 May
  - Fritz Ursell, German-born British mathematician and fluid mechanics expert (b. 1923).
  - Donald Nicholson, British biochemist (b. 1916).
- 20 May – Eugene Polley, American engineer, inventor of the wireless television remote control (b. 1915).
- 21 May – Alan Thorne, Australian anthropologist (b. 1939).
- 27 May – Friedrich Hirzebruch, German mathematician (b. 1927).
- 30 May – Sir Andrew Huxley, British physiologist and biophysicist, winner of the 1963 Nobel Prize in Physiology or Medicine (b. 1917).

=== June ===
- 7 June
  - Phillip V. Tobias, South African paleoanthropologist (b. 1925).
  - F. Herbert Bormann, American plant ecologist, credited with the discovery of acid rain (b. 1922).
- 13 June – William Standish Knowles, American chemist, winner of the 2001 Nobel Prize in Chemistry (b. 1917).

=== July ===
- 3 July – Sergio Pininfarina, Italian automotive engineer and Senator for life (b. 1926).
- 8 July – Lord Henry Chilver, British engineer, lecturer and politician (b. 1926).
- 21 July – Geoffrey Hattersley-Smith, British geologist and glaciologist (b. 1923).
- 23 July – Sally Ride, American physicist and astronaut, first American woman in space (b. 1951).
- 26 July – Ralph Slatyer, Australian ecologist and first Chief Scientist of Australia (b. 1929).

=== August ===
- 2 August – Sir Gabriel Horn, British biologist (b. 1927).
- 3 August – Martin Fleischmann, British chemist and cold fusion theorist (b. 1927).
- 6 August – Sir Bernard Lovell, British physicist and radio astronomer (b. 1913).
- 14 August – Sergei Kapitsa, Russian physicist and TV host (b. 1928).
- 21 August – William Thurston, American mathematician, winner of the 1982 Fields Medal (b. 1946).
- 25 August – Neil Armstrong, American astronaut, first human being to set foot upon the Moon (b. 1930).

=== September ===
- 6 September – Jerome Horwitz, American chemist, inventor of the anti-HIV drug azidothymidine (b. 1919).
- 8 September – Bill Moggridge, British industrial designer who created the original laptop shape (b. 1943).
- 9 September – Ron Taylor, Australian shark expert, conservationist and filmmaker (b. 1934).
- 13 September – Dilhan Eryurt, Turkish astrophysicist (b. 1926).
- 25 September – Dame Louise Johnson, British biochemist (b. 1940).
- 29 September – Neil Smith, Scottish geographer (b. 1954).

=== October ===
- 5 October – Keith Campbell, British biologist who was involved in creating the first cloned mammal (b. 1954)
- 15 October – Maria Petrou, Greek-born British artificial intelligence researcher (b. 1953).
- 17 October – Stanford Ovshinsky, American physicist and inventor who designed the battery now used in hybrid cars (b. 1922).
- 20 October
  - E. Donnall Thomas, American physician, joint winner of the 1990 Nobel Prize in Physiology or Medicine (b. 1920).
  - Paul Kurtz, American skeptic, philosopher and secular humanist (b. 1925).
- 29 October – Wallace L. W. Sargent, Anglo-American astronomer (b. 1935).

=== November ===
- 11 November – Farish Jenkins, American paleontologist (b. 1940).
- 12 November – Daniel Stern, American psychologist (b. 1934).
- 14 November – Norman Greenwood, Australian chemist (b. 1925).
- 26 November – Joseph Murray, American surgeon and organ transplant pioneer, joint winner of the 1990 Nobel Prize in Physiology or Medicine (b. 1919).

=== December ===
- 9 December
  - Sir Patrick Moore, English astronomer (b. 1923).
  - Alex Moulton, English mechanical engineer and inventor (b. 1920).
  - Norman Joseph Woodland, American engineer, inventor of the barcode (b. 1921).
- 17 December – Colin Spedding, British agricultural scientist (b. 1925).
- 24 December – Guy Dodson, New Zealand biochemist (b. 1937).
- 27 December – Archie Roy, Scottish astronomer (b. 1924).
- 30 December
  - Rita Levi-Montalcini, Italian neurologist and Senator for life, joint winner of the 1986 Nobel Prize in Physiology or Medicine (b. 1909).
  - Carl Woese, American microbiologist (b. 1924).

== See also ==
- List of emerging technologies
- List of years in science
- 2012 in paleontology
- 2012 in spaceflight
