= 2011 in science =

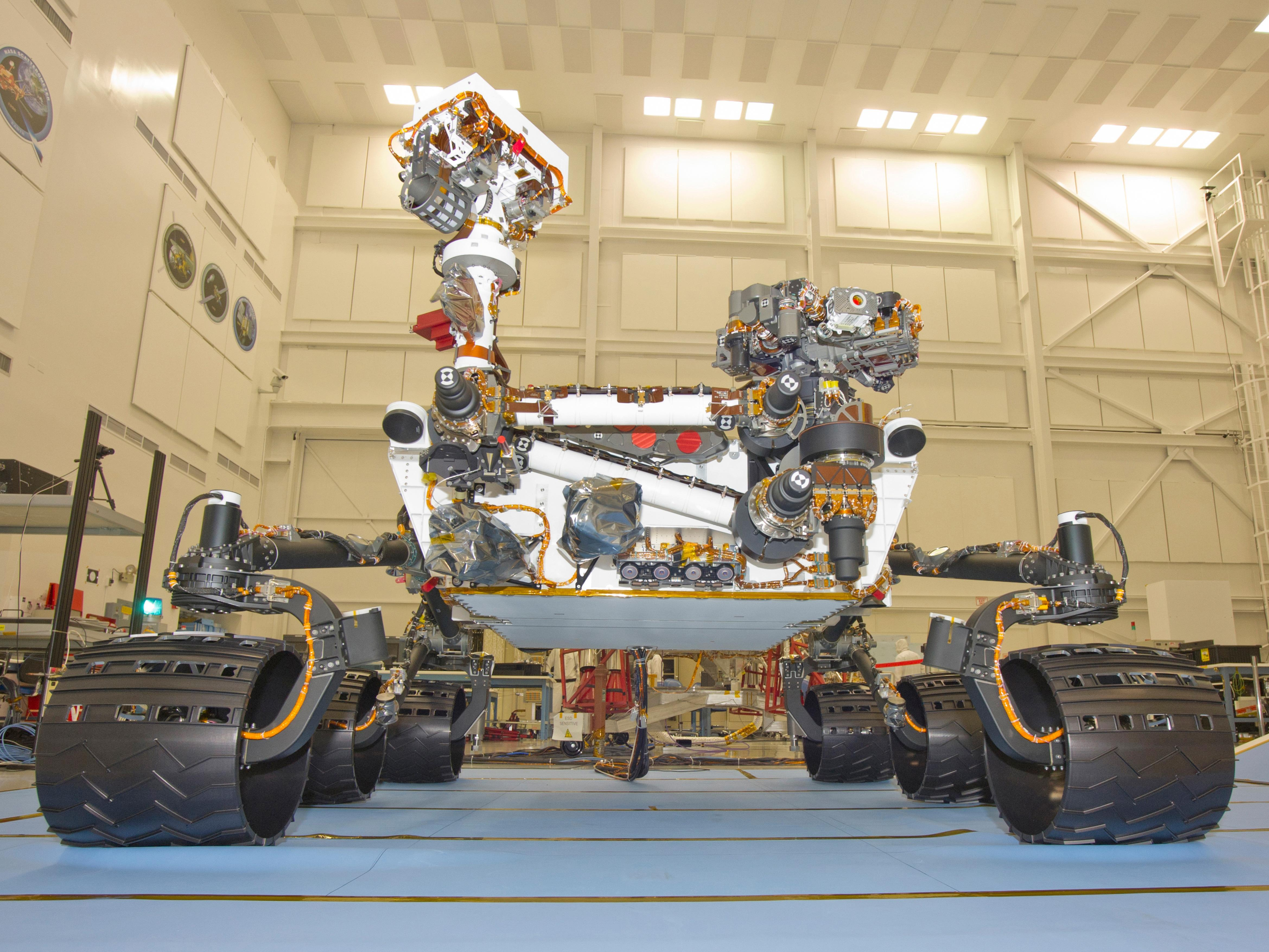
26 November 2011: NASA launches its Curiosity rover (pictured), the largest Mars rover yet built.

The year 2011 involved many significant scientific events, including the first artificial organ transplant, the launch of China's first space station and the growth of the world population to seven billion. The year saw a total of 78 successful orbital spaceflights, as well as numerous advances in fields such as electronics, medicine, genetics, climatology and robotics.

2011 was declared the International Year of Forests and Chemistry by the United Nations.

== Events, discoveries and inventions ==
=== January ===
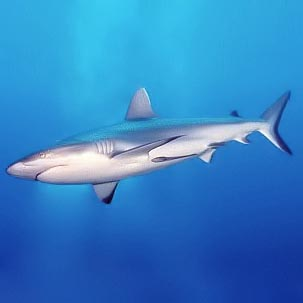
18 January 2011: scientists prove that sharks are functionally colorblind.

- 3 January – American pharmaceutical company Johnson & Johnson announces a partnership for the development of a test for the detection of metastatic cancer in the bloodstream.
- 5 January
  - Researchers at the University of Pennsylvania find that a major cause of baldness may be related to the inability of some stem cells to grow into full-sized hair follicles.
  - An engineer from the University of Missouri announces his ambition to create a flexible solar sheet of small nano-antennas, capable of capturing solar energy with 90% efficiency; this would mark a significant improvement over contemporary commercial solar panels, which have an average efficiency of around 20%.
- 6 January – The Journal of Personality and Social Psychology, a peer-reviewed journal of the American Psychological Association, announces that it will shortly publish a paper presenting strong evidence of ESP, the ability to sense future events.
- 11 January – Kepler-10b, the first confirmed small rocky exoplanet, is discovered in the constellation Draco using NASA's Kepler space telescope.
- 12 January – Researchers announce that salty junk food can damage arteries in as little as thirty minutes after being eaten.
- 14 January – A study conducted at the Innsbruck Medical University in Austria reveals that stainless steel or titanium tongue piercings harbor more bacteria than plastic piercings.
- 15 January – In a study funded by the U.S. National Cancer Institute, researchers reveal that smoking cigarettes can cause damages in the body in minutes rather than years.
- 18 January – Researchers in Australia announce that sharks are colorblind, after examining the eyes of 17 separate shark species.
- 19 January – A Cochrane Library review suggests that antioxidants may improve male fertility. This work was updated in 2019 and noted that only low quality evidence from small randomized controlled trials supports this association and higher quality larger studies are needed to understand more about the association between antioxidants and male fertility.

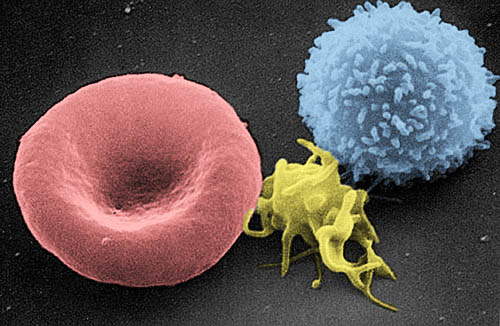
20 January 2011: researchers demonstrate a medical technique that renders human T-cells (pictured, right) resistant to HIV.

- 20 January
  - A landmark study unveils a medical technique that renders T-cells resistant to HIV.
  - The World Meteorological Organization concludes that 2010 was the joint-hottest year on record.
  - Scientists achieve 10 billion bits of quantum entanglement in silicon, a significant step in quantum computing.
- 21 January – An article in Science reveals the discovery of a Darwinopterus pterosaur in China with an unhatched egg, thereby allowing the genders to be differentiated.
- 24 January
  - Researchers publish direct evidence that massive volcanic eruptions took place 250 million years ago, likely causing the Permian–Triassic extinction event, the biggest single extinction event in Earth's history.
  - An article in Proceedings of the National Academy of Sciences reveals the discovery of Linhenykus monodactylus, an alvarezsaurid theropod dinosaur, in Inner Mongolia; though a cousin to the giant Tyrannosaurus rex, it is no bigger than a modern parrot, and possesses only one claw on each forelimb.
  - Scientists and students have built a 3D printer that makes edible food.
- 27 January
  - Under pressure from industry and governments, the European Commission is putting the final touches on a strategy to reduce Europe's dependence on Chinese-supplied rare-earth metals, which are essential in export products like cars and electronics.
  - Astronomers document H1504+65, a white dwarf in Ursa Minor with the hottest surface temperature known at this time, at 200,000 K.
- 30 January – Molybdenite is revealed to be up to 100,000 times more efficient than silicon transistors, and to have better electrical properties than graphene.

=== February ===
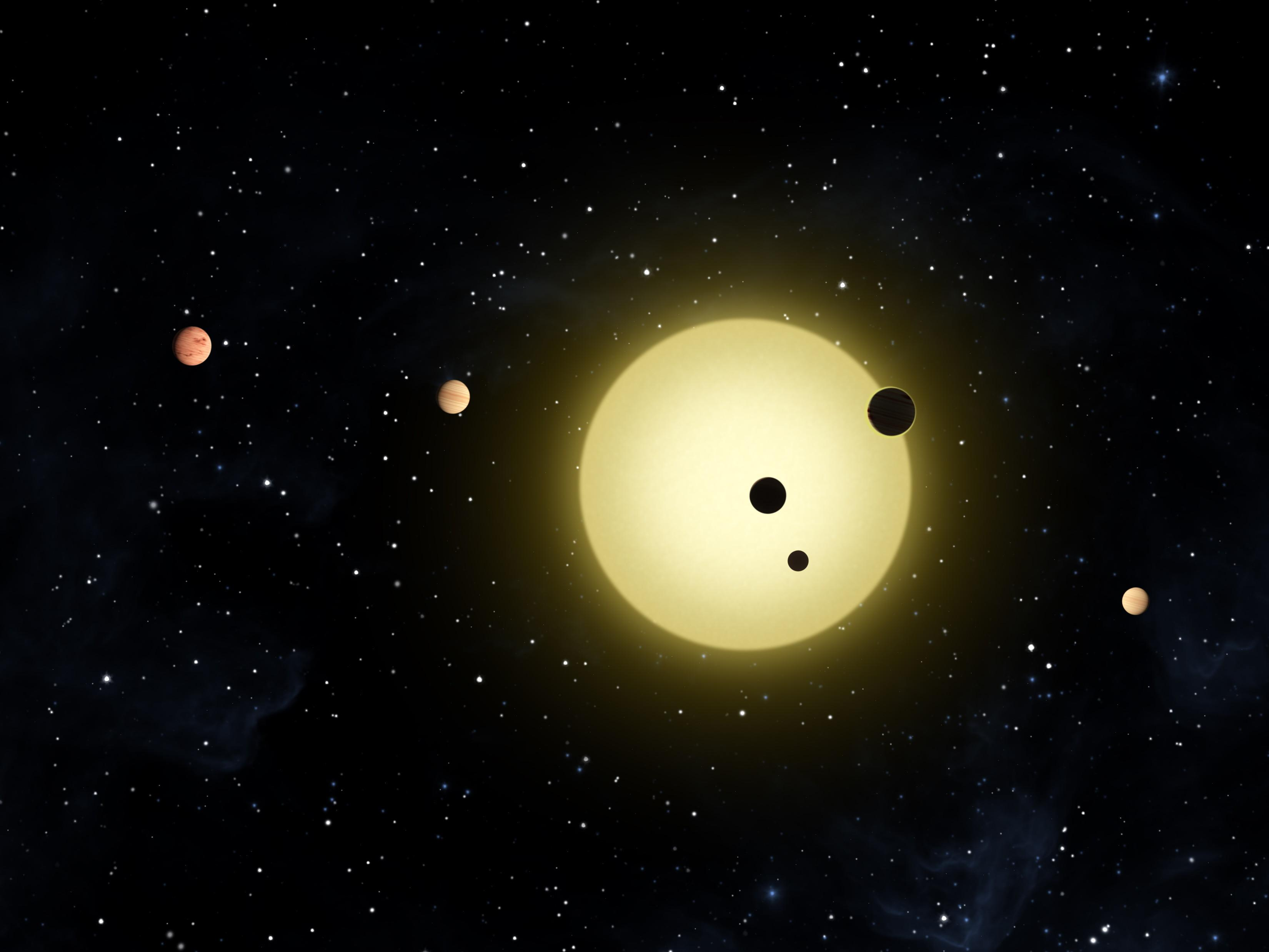
3 February 2011: the Kepler space telescope discovers a planetary system of six planets orbiting the star Kepler-11 (artist's impression pictured).

- 2 February – The Linac Coherent Light Source, an X-ray source a billion times brighter than previous sources, becomes operational at Stanford University. The device could potentially revolutionize 3D bioanalysis techniques, especially in the analysis of proteins and viruses.
- 3 February
  - A blood test to detect vCJD is developed by British scientists, who say it could identify healthy people who are carriers of the disease.
  - Further data from the Kepler space telescope published in Nature reveals that the star Kepler-11, located 2,000 light years from Earth, has a planetary system including six planets, which range between two and four-and-a-half times the radius of Earth, and between two and thirteen times its mass. Five orbit the star closer than Mercury orbits the Sun, and all are likely to have atmospheres made of light gases, and to be too hot to support life. The data also includes details of more than 1,000 additional exoplanet candidates.
- 4 February – Scientists reveal a tiny artificial brain, derived from rat neurons, that exhibits 12 seconds of short-term memory.
- 7 February – Scientists at Oxford University successfully test a universal flu vaccine, which should work against all known strains of the illness.
- 9 February – Using 25 years of evidence from over 470,000 participants, researchers show that sleep deprivation and disrupted sleep patterns can have long-term, serious health implications.
- 10 February – Scientists identify the root molecular cause of a variety of illnesses brought on by advanced age, including waning energy, failure of the heart and other organs, and metabolic disorders such as diabetes.
- 11 February – Scientists show that stem cells delivered via a nasal spray lead to an improvement of motor functions in rats with Parkinson's disease-like symptoms.
- 15 February
  - In a world first for artificial intelligence, IBM's Watson supercomputer defeats two humans on the Jeopardy! quiz show.
  - Scientists report stimulation of mouse muscle fibers in a way similar to the regeneration of severed limbs in newts and salamanders.
- 16 February – Researchers find a way of manipulating tiny swimming robots, just 1.3 millimetres long, using electric currents in water.
- 17 February
  - Scientists build the world's first anti-laser, capable of absorbing an incoming laser beam entirely.
  - A hummingbird-like "Nano Air Vehicle" is demonstrated for the first time, in an attempt to secure a DARPA contract to create small surveillance aircraft.
- 20 February – Stanford University researchers create new stretchable solar cells that could power artificial electronic 'super skin', capable of detecting chemicals and biological molecules. The potential applications include clothing, robotics, prosthetic limbs and more.
- 21 February – New research indicates that bilingual speakers are better at multitasking, because they are better at editing out irrelevant information; this overturns previous assumptions of bilingualism causing confusion, especially in children.
- 22 February
  - The first complete millimeter-scale computing system is developed.
  - Chinese scientists calculate a quantum law of protein folding that explains the impact of temperature on folding.
  - The first full-color quantum dot display prototype is unveiled by Samsung.
- 28 February
  - Scientists at Yale University demonstrate that bulk metallic glasses (BMGs) can be blow-molded into shapes that would be impossible with normal metals without loss in strength or durability.
  - A pacemaker the size of a Tic Tac is announced by Medtronic.

=== March ===
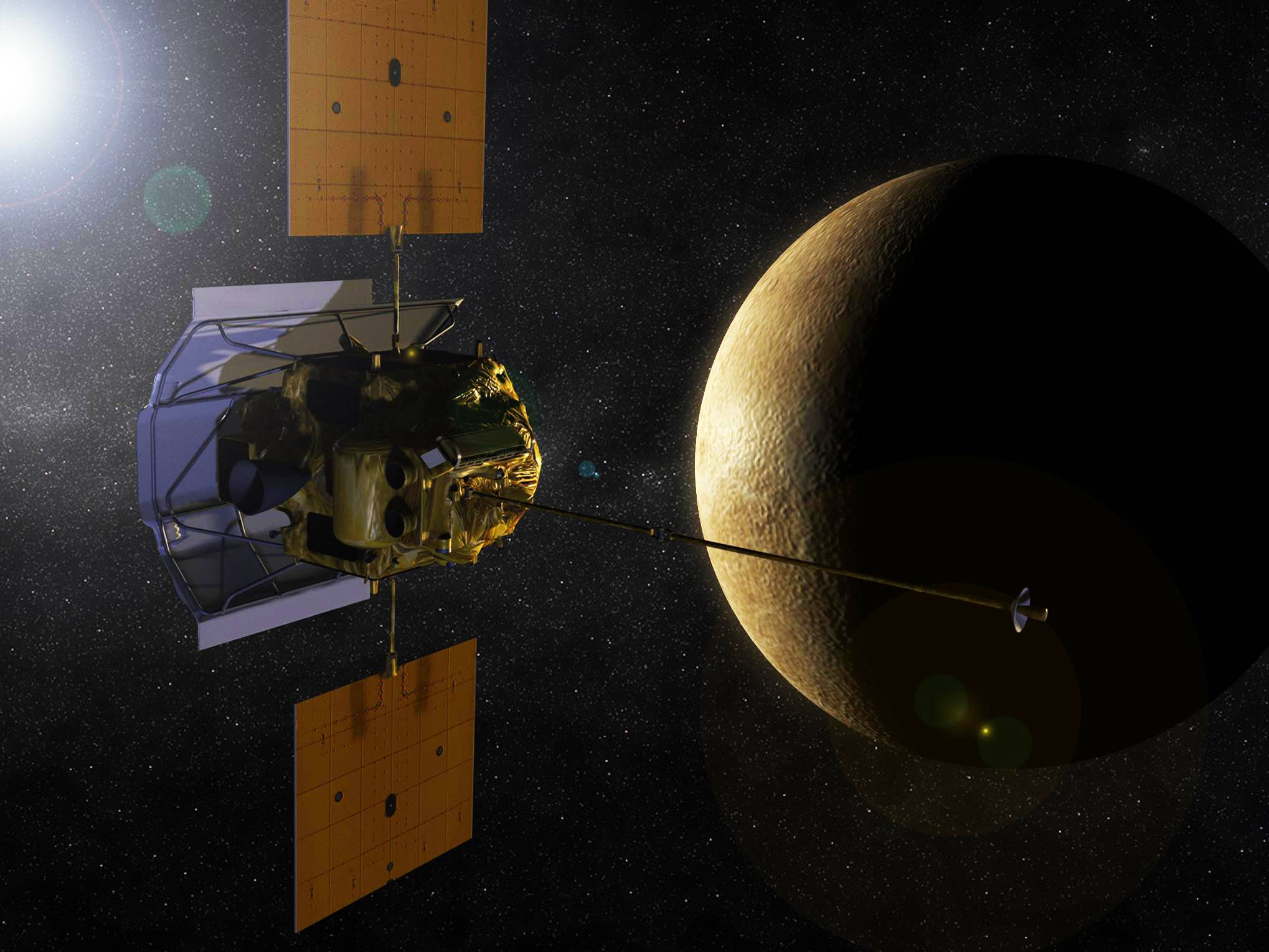
18 March 2011: the MESSENGER probe (artist's rendering shown) becomes the first spacecraft to orbit the planet Mercury.

- 1 March
  - UK researchers demonstrate an optical microscope with one of the highest resolutions yet achieved, capable of imaging objects as little as 50 nanometres across.
  - Scientists have determined how to generate a backward-pulling force from a forward-propagating beam, effectively creating a form of "tractor beam".
  - Swiss researchers discover a gene in wasps that allow them to reproduce asexually.
- 4 March
  - Researchers transform a human embryonic stem cell into a critical type of neuron that dies early in Alzheimer's disease and is a major cause of memory loss; the discovery may have major implications in the treatment of the disease.
  - A groundbreaking study of mice indicates the liver, not the brain, could be the source of amyloid brain plaques associated with Alzheimer's disease.
- 5 March – The United States Air Force launches its robotic Boeing X-37 spaceplane on its second long-duration spaceflight; the spaceplane ultimately remains in orbit for 469 days.
- 8 March – The world's first tissue-engineered urethras are successfully used.
- 12 March – Surgeons in Houston, Texas, successfully implant the world's first continuous-flow artificial heart in a human patient. The turbine-based device is efficient and long-lived, and may herald the mass production of smaller and more durable alternatives to conventional artificial hearts.
- 14 March – Archeologists believe that they have found the lost city of Atlantis in mud swamps near Cadiz, Spain. They theorize that a tsunami struck the ancient settlement; a television special on the National Geographic Channel later investigates their findings.
- 16 March – Scientists report the first successful use of microcarriers to bring anti-cancer drugs to the targeted area in the liver of a living rabbit.
- 18 March – NASA's MESSENGER spacecraft successfully enters orbit around the planet Mercury – the first probe to do so.
- 20 March
  - A new way of delivering drugs to the brain, using the body's own exosomes, is developed by scientists, overcoming a major barrier to the delivery of potential new drugs for many neurological diseases, including Alzheimer's.
  - Researchers announce the development of a three-dimensional nanostructure for battery cathodes that allows for dramatically faster charging, without sacrificing energy storage capacity. This could lead to cellphones that charge in seconds, and electric cars that charge in minutes.
  - A new way of making battery electrodes, based on nanostructured metal foams, can be used to make a lithium-ion battery that recharge by 90% in under two minutes.
  - Scientists demonstrate how SHANK3, a brain protein, may trigger autism-like behavior in mice by stopping effective communication between brain cells.
- 22 March – A 6 cm-by-6 cm chip holding nine quantum devices, among them four "quantum bits", is demonstrated at the American Physical Society meeting in Dallas, Texas. It is hoped that further scaling up to 10 qubits should be possible later this year.

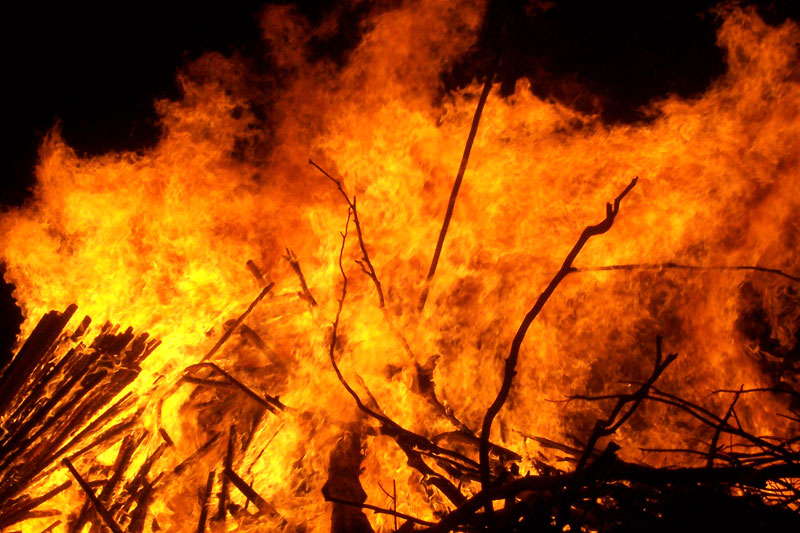
27 March 2011: American scientists successfully demonstrate a fire-suppression system which uses electric fields to extinguish open flames.

- 24 March
  - A landmark study indicates that pioglitazone prevents the development of type 2 diabetes in 72% of pre-diabetic subject participants, the largest such decrease yet demonstrated by any intervention.
  - The first sperm cells are grown in a lab.
- 27 March – Harvard University scientists demonstrate use of an electric field to extinguish an open flame more than 1 foot tall, a development they say could yield fire-suppression alternatives to water and chemical retardants.
- 31 March – Scientists announce the successful controlled entanglement of 14 quantum bits (qubits), realizing the largest quantum register yet produced—nearly double the previous record for the number of entangled quantum bits realized.

=== April ===
- 4 April
  - A human heart is grown in a laboratory from stem cells, marking a major advance in personalized medicine.
  - Five more genes which increase the risk of developing Alzheimer's have been identified, taking the number of genes linked to the disease to 10.
  - A meta-study indicates that people with autism process visual information differently from non-autistic people.
  - A particle accelerator in the United States shows compelling hints of a never-before-seen particle – researchers say it could be "the most significant discovery in physics in half a century".
- 5 April
  - Scientists develop a novel approach to inhibiting angiogenesis for cancer treatment.
  - The Russian Federal Space Agency announces a joint plan with NASA to develop a future nuclear-powered rocket.

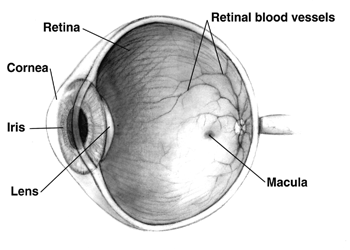
6 April 2011: scientists in Japan grow working retinas from mouse stem cells.

- 6 April – Japanese scientists announce that they have created working retinas from mouse stem cells.
- 11 April – ZRTP, a cryptographic key-agreement Real-time Transport Protocol devised by Phil Zimmermann, is published.
- 12 April
  - According to a controversial study, the aging process can be reduced by increasing telomere lengths without cancer risk.
  - Scientists produce the first comprehensive analysis of the greenhouse gas footprint of shale gas, concluding that its environmental impact is worse than coal.
- 13 April
  - Cellphones may be contributing to a global decline in honeybee populations, according to researchers.
  - American scientists discover that light can demonstrate strong magnetic effects when travelling through certain materials at certain intensities. This finding, which overturns a century-old scientific assumption that light's magnetic effects are too weak to be tangible, may lead to the development of solar panels capable of storing energy magnetically.
- 14 April
  - More than 1,000 UK patients with advanced pancreatic cancer have joined a trial using a new vaccine to treat the disease.
  - Shrinkage in parts of the brain of some with Alzheimer's disease can be detected up to a decade before symptoms appear.
- 15 April
  - The world's first human brain map is unveiled, providing an interactive research tool that will help scientists to understand how the brain works. The map is hoped to aid new discoveries in disease and treatments; one thousand anatomical sites in the brain can be searched, supported by more than 100 million data points that indicate the gene expression and biochemistry of each site.
- 16 April – Sci-Hub – a shadow library website for open access that provides free access to most paywalled research papers and books without regard to copyright – is launched.
- 17 April – Researchers have injected biodegradable nanofiber spheres carrying cells into wounds to grow tissue.
- 18 April
  - Scientists demonstrate mathematically that asymmetrical materials should be possible; such material would allow most light or sound waves through in one direction, while preventing them from doing so in the opposite direction; such materials would allow the construction of true one-way mirrors, soundproof rooms, or even quantum computers that use light to perform calculations.
  - A new design for thin-film solar cells has been developed that requires significantly less silicon than standard models, and may be more efficient at capturing solar energy.
- 19 April – An international research team publishes a new method to produce belts of graphene, called nanoribbons. By using hydrogen, they have managed to transform single-walled carbon nanotubes into ribbons.
- 20 April – Scientists describe a Chinese spider they say is the biggest fossilised arachnid yet found; Nephila jurassica, as they have called their specimen, would have had a leg span of some 15 cm.

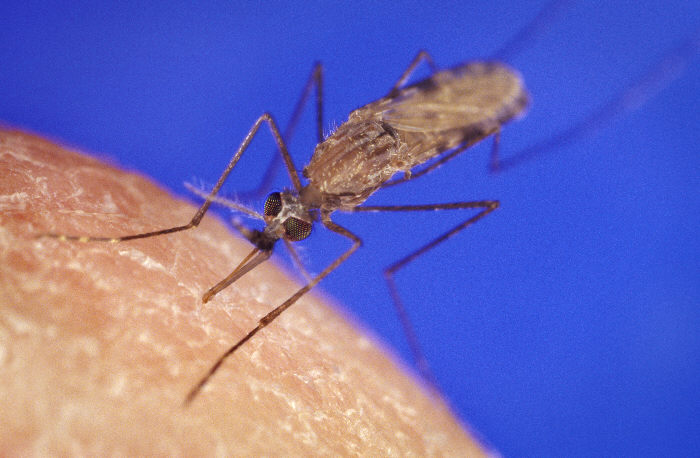
21 April 2011: a modified anti-malaria gene is successfully introduced to a population of mosquitoes.

- 21 April
  - Scientists successfully cause a modified anti-malaria gene to spread amongst a population of mosquitoes.
  - Researchers have built a carbon nanotube synapse circuit whose behavior in tests reproduces the function of a neuron, the building block of the human brain.
  - Israeli engineers have built an artificial device capable of detecting cancers of the head and neck by analysing breath.
- 22 April – Gene transcription is observed in real time in a live cell.
- 24 April – Small lasers capable of igniting a fuel/air mixture more efficiently, resulting in less pollution, may replace spark plugs in gasoline engines.
- 25 April
  - Some microbes can survive gravity more than 400,000 times that felt on Earth, a new study says. By contrast, most humans can tolerate three to five times Earth's surface gravity before losing consciousness.
  - The European Commission has approved plans to build a trio of lasers that will each dwarf the power of any previous laser. The project, called the Extreme Light Infrastructure, will lay the groundwork for building an even more powerful laser that could try to pull "virtual" particles out of the vacuum of space-time.
- 28 April
  - Researchers publish findings of three more genes linked to the most common form of breast cancer, which could provide targets for new treatments.
  - According to an American Physical Society report, technologies for removing carbon dioxide from the atmosphere are unlikely to offer an economically feasible way to slow human-driven climate change for several decades.

=== May ===
- 1 May
  - Researchers successfully store a qubit in a single atom by writing the quantum state of single photons into a rubidium atom and reading it out again later.
  - A Detroit entrepreneur has invented a heat-treatment that makes steel 7 percent stronger than any steel on record in less than 10 seconds.
- 3 May
  - Middle-aged people who are overweight but not obese are 71% more likely to develop dementia than those with a normal weight, according to new research; links between obesity and dementia had previously been found.
  - Scientists have used nanoscale capsules to release an immune system-stimulating protein directly into lung cancer tumors.
  - Australian researchers say they are a step closer to finding a vaccine for HIV, and hope to be able to offer a preventative jab by 2020.
- 4 May
  - Yukon fossils may represent the first early traces of biomineralization in eukaryotes.
  - Experimental data gathered by the Gravity Probe B satellite confirms two aspects of the general theory of relativity, which was published by Albert Einstein in 1916.
  - CERN scientists have confined antihydrogen atoms for 1,000 seconds, four orders of magnitude longer than has ever been achieved before in capturing and maintaining antimatter atoms.
  - Intel unveils its next generation of microprocessor technology, codenamed Ivy Bridge. The upcoming chips will be the first to use a 22 nanometre manufacturing process, which packs transistors more densely than the current 32nm system, providing greater efficiency.
- 6 May
  - A new study suggests that the drop in production of neurons in old age is due to the shrinking cache of adult stem cells in our brains.
  - A machine used for measuring impurities in semiconductors can be used to analyze immune cells in far more detail than has been previously possible, researchers from Stanford University have shown.
  - Researchers have identified a group of mitochondrial proteins, the absence of which allows other protein groups to stabilise the genome. This could delay the onset of age-related diseases and increase lifespan.
- 9 May – Smog-eating aluminium panels which clean themselves and the air around them are unveiled; their titanium dioxide coating, when combined with sunlight, acts as a catalyst to break down pollutants into harmless matter that rain washes away.
- 11 May
  - A new phylum of fungi is announced, and named cryptomycota ("hidden fungi").
  - A new vaccine can protect macaques against the monkey equivalent of HIV, and could provide a fresh approach to an HIV vaccine, a study suggests.
  - D-Wave Systems, after some 12 years of research, the accumulation of 60 patents, and the filing of 100 more, has released the world's first commercial quantum computer, priced at $10 million.
- 12 May – The exoplanet Gliese 581d can be considered the first confirmed exoplanet that could potentially support Earth-like life, according to a team of French scientists.

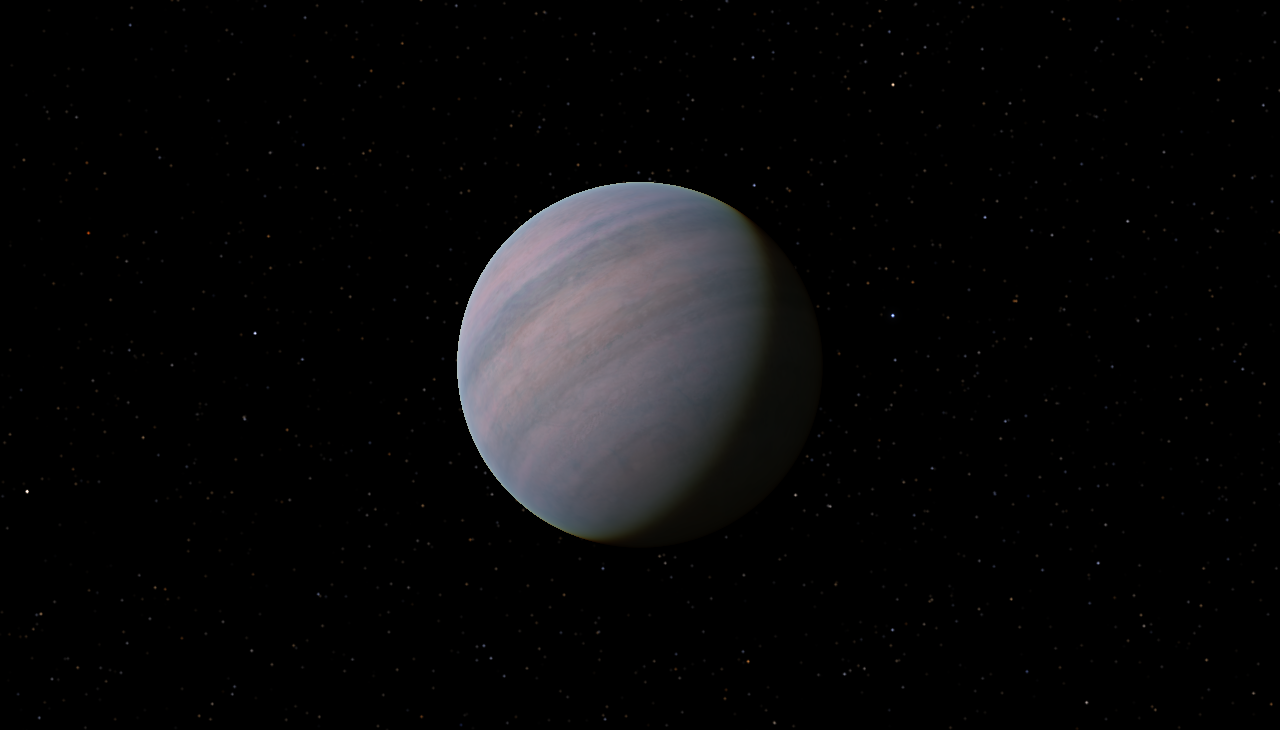
12 May 2011: astronomers state that the exoplanet Gliese 581d (artist's impression pictured) could potentially support Earth-like life.

- 13 May
  - New results from mice cast doubts on hopes for self-transplants generated from the receiver's stem cells, as such transplants can be rejected by the immune system.
  - According to new research, a small set of genes located within the mitochondria of cells is crucial to unravelling the secrets of male infertility.
  - The discovery of a new physical phenomenon could yield transistors with greatly enhanced capacitance – a measure of the voltage required to move a charge. This, in turn, could lead to the revival of clock speed as the measure of a computer's power.
  - Contaminated water can be cleaned much more effectively using a novel, cheap material, which could offer a low-cost way to purify water in the developing world.
- 15 May – Researchers have found that KLF14, a gene linked to type 2 diabetes and cholesterol levels, is in fact a 'master regulator' gene, which controls the behaviour of other genes found within fat in the body.
- 16 May – NASA's Space Shuttle Endeavour launches on its final mission.
- 18 May
  - Scientists have achieved invisibility in the visible light range of the spectrum.
  - Rogue planets lacking parent stars may outnumber "normal" exoplanets by at least 50 percent, and are nearly twice as common in our galaxy as main-sequence stars, according to a new study.
- 19 May
  - By using electrical stimulation of the spinal cord, a man from Oregon who became paralyzed after being hit by a car can stand and move his legs on his own.
  - Scientists have developed an open-source desktop genome analyzer. It works in conjunction with a browser that allows biologists to rapidly and easily analyze and process their high-throughput information.
- 20 May – A highly developed sense of smell kick-started the evolution of mammals' big brains, according to new research.
- 23 May
  - Researchers have set a new record for the rate of data transfer using a single laser: 26 terabits per second.
  - The bacteria responsible for stomach ulcers have been linked to Parkinson's disease, according to American researchers.
- 24 May – A superhot substance recently made in the Large Hadron Collider is the densest form of matter ever observed, scientists have announced.

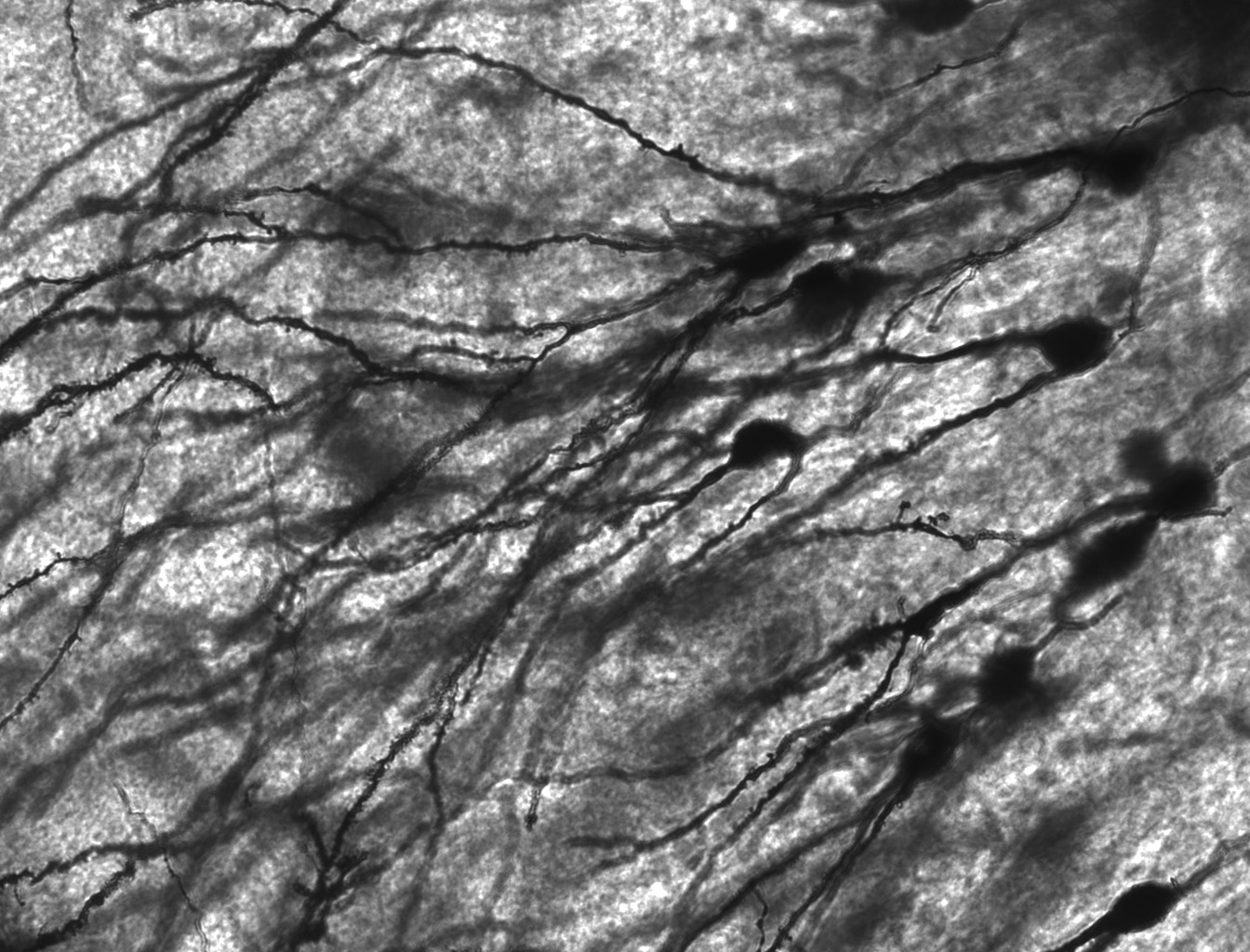
26 May 2011: American scientists successfully transmute human skin cells directly into neurons (pictured).

- 25 May
  - Reexamination of data indicates that the gamma-ray burst GRB 090423 may be the most distant single object yet detected; scientists believe the blast, which was detected by NASA's Swift Observatory, occurred a mere 520 million years after the Big Bang.
  - NASA ends its operational planning activities for the veteran Mars rover Spirit; it will now transition the Mars Exploration Rover Project to a single-rover operation focused on Spirit's still-active twin, Opportunity.
  - Swedish scientists unveil a technique that causes the brain to misinterpret the size of the human body.
- 26 May
  - Stanford University researchers have managed to turn human skin cells directly into neurons, without first turning them into pluripotent stem cells.
  - Researchers believe they have made the first experimental observation of the dynamical Casimir effect, using a rapidly moving mirror that turns virtual photons into real ones.
- 29 May – Human organs could be grown inside pigs for use in transplant operations, following research using stem cells.
- 31 May
  - A team of Chinese physicists successfully entangles eight photons simultaneously and observes them in action; the previous record was six.
  - Researchers have demonstrated the first true nanoscale waveguides for next generation on-chip optical communication systems; this holds potential for nanoscale photonic applications such as intra-chip optical communication, signal modulation, nanoscale lasers and bio-medical sensing.
  - A NASA-led research team unveils the most precise map ever produced of the carbon stored in Earth's tropical forests; the data is expected to provide a baseline for ongoing carbon monitoring and research.

=== June ===
1 June 2011: two new chemical elements, 114 and 116, are officially added to the periodic table.

- June – Baltic Sea anomaly discovered.
- 1 June
  - Elements 114 and 116 are officially added to the periodic table, becoming its heaviest members yet. (New Scientist) (IUPAC) (Pure Appl. Chem.)
  - Scientists have discovered a worm that is the deepest-living animal known, surviving in 48-degree-Celsius (118 Fahrenheit) water at depths of 1.3 kilometres (0.81 mi). (BBC) (Nature)
- 2 June – A team of students at the University of California is developing a first-of-its kind, phase-change memory solid-state storage device that provides performance thousands of times faster than a conventional hard drive, and up to seven times faster than current state-of-the-art solid-state drives. (Jacobs School of Engineering)
- 3 June
  - Researchers have bent one of the most basic rules of quantum mechanics by succeeding in observing light behaving as both a wave and a particle. (BBC) (Science)
  - Six men in the MARS-500 facility near Moscow have now been in isolation for exactly 365 days, simulating a human mission to Mars. (New Scientist) (ESA)
  - About one in 10 rocky planets around stars like the Sun may host a moon proportionally as large as Earth's. (BBC) (arXiv) (Icarus)
- 6 June – A team of Virginia Commonwealth University scientists has discovered a new class of 'superatoms' – a stable cluster of atoms that can mimic different elements of the periodic table – with unusual magnetic characteristics.(PNAS)
- 7 June – Fragranced clothing, triggered by scent molecules that are stable in the dark and only release their aroma when exposed to light, has been described in a thesis written by scientist Dr. Olga Hinze of Cologne University. (Henkel)
- 8 June – China's carbon dioxide emissions rose 10.4 percent in 2010 compared with the previous year, as global emissions rose at their fastest rate for more than four decades, according to data released by BP. (Reuters) (BP)
- 9 June
  - Researchers have achieved a breakthrough in anti-bacterial science, identifying natural ingredients capable of eradicating bacteria that have developed resistance to antibiotics. (TNO)
  - Type 2 diabetes, previously regarded as inevitably progressive, is successfully reversed in a group of newly diagnosed patients by an extreme eight-week diet of 600 calories a day. (BBC) (Diabetologia)
- 10 June
  - Cross-checks on data that hinted at the discovery of a new sub-atomic particle have failed to find support for the observation. (BBC) (arXiv) Phys. Rev. Lett.
  - US scientists publish data about how nicotine acts as an appetite suppressant, a finding that could help in fighting obesity. (Sunday Morning Herald) (Science)

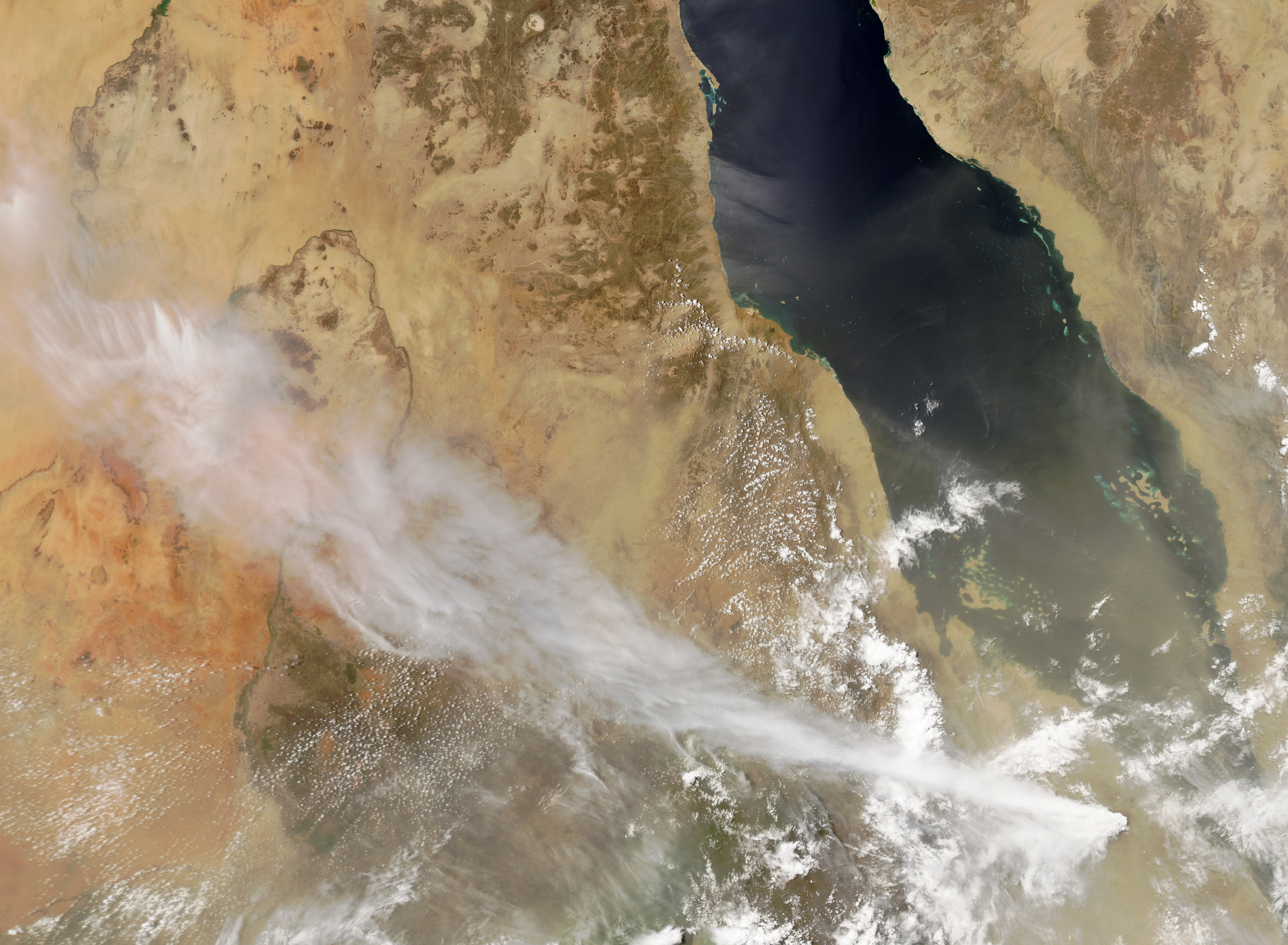
12 June 2011: the Nabro Volcano erupts in Eritrea (ash plume pictured), despite having been considered extinct.

- 12 June – The Nabro Volcano begins to erupt, releasing the highest quantity of sulfur dioxide ever observed by satellite. (Earthquake-Report.com)
- 13 June – A study suggests that protostars may be seeding the universe with water. These stellar embryos shoot jets of material from their north and south poles as their growth is fed by infalling dust, which circles the bodies in vast disks. (National Geographic) (Astron. Astrophys.)
- 14 June
  - A study reveals that, on average, three to five days of global human activity produces the equivalent amount of carbon dioxide that volcanoes produce globally each year. (US Geological Survey)
  - Ten new planets outside our Solar System have been spotted by the French-led COROT satellite, bringing the total number of known exoplanets to 561. (BBC)
  - A Japanese experiment sees hints that neutrino particles can oscillate between all three types, opening new lines of research to test why matter became more prevalent than antimatter in the Big Bang. (BBC) (arXiv) Phys. Rev. Lett.
- 15 June – A central lunar eclipse takes place, with a totality of 1 hour and 40 minutes. (Herald Sun)
- 16 June – Researchers have developed a scalable approach to fabricating high-speed graphene transistors. Nano Lett.
- 17 June
  - The United States Department of Energy reports that it will invest $150 million in a private company that has developed a silicon-wafer solar cell that can be manufactured twice as cheaply as standard solar cells. (Huffington Post)
  - Thousands of insects are being lined up to have their genomes sequenced. The five-year project will help researchers pinpoint vulnerable regions of insects' genomes, which could be targeted with pesticides. (BBC) (Entomological Society of America)
  - Scientists have developed a nano-device that powers itself by harvesting energy from vibrations, while at the same time transmitting data wirelessly with a range of up to 10 metres (33 ft). (PopSci) (Nano Lett.)
- 19 June
  - Researchers have used a human vaccine to cure prostate cancer in mice. (Medical Xpress) (Nat. Med.)
  - The oceans are in a worse state than previously suspected, with a mass extinction of marine species looming, according to a new report. (BBC) (IPSO)
- 20 June – A Japanese computer has taken first place on the Top 500 supercomputer list, ending China's reign at the top after just six months. Capable of operating at 8.16 petaflops (quadrillion floating-point calculations per second), the K computer is more powerful than the next five systems combined. (ComputerWorld)

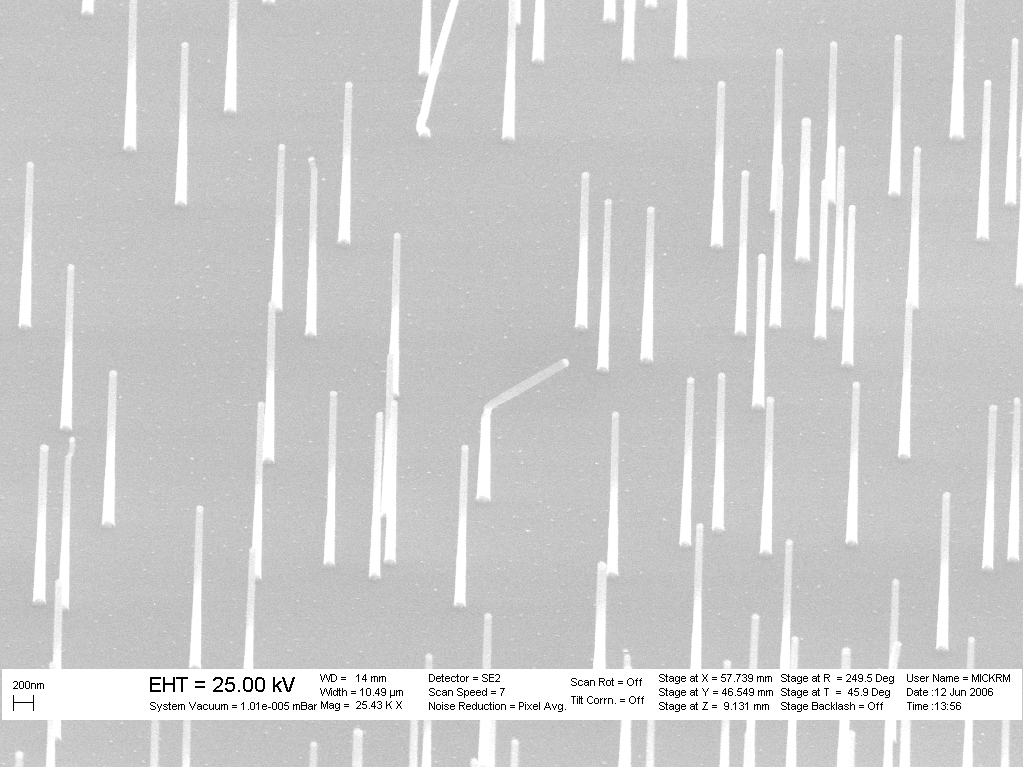
22 June 2011: Stanford University engineers develop nanowire electronics that can be attached to nearly any surface (gold nanowires pictured).

- 22 June
  - A newly developed multiferroic composite of nickel, cobalt, manganese and tin can be either non-magnetic or highly magnetic, depending on its temperature, making it capable of converting heat into electricity. (PopSci) (Adv. Energy Mater.)
  - The brains of people living in cities operate differently from those in rural areas, according to a brain-scanning study. (The Guardian) (Nature)
  - Scientists demonstrate an acoustic "cloaking device" that makes objects invisible to sound waves; such acoustic cloaking was proposed theoretically in 2008, but has only this year been put into practice. (BBC) (Phys. Rev. Lett.)
  - Stanford University researchers have developed a new method of attaching nanowire electronics to the surface of virtually any object, regardless of its shape or composition. The method could be used in making everything from wearable electronics and flexible computer displays to high-efficiency solar cells and ultrasensitive biosensors.(Nano Lett.)
- 23 June – Single-celled yeast has been observed to evolve into a multicellular organism, complete with division of labour between cells. This suggests that the evolutionary leap to multicellularity may be a surprisingly small hurdle.(New Scientist) (PNAS)
- 24 June
  - A tiny biological fuel cell powered by bacteria, with a capacity of just 0.3 microliters, has been built by researchers at Carnegie Mellon University (CMU). The new device, the size of a single strand of human hair, generates energy from the metabolism of bacteria on thin gold plates in micro-manufactured channels. (Engadget) (Biotechnol. Bioeng.)
  - Biologists publish the explanation for yeast cells reversing aging. (Science)
- 25 June – Stanford researchers have developed a microphone that can be used at any depth in the ocean, even under crushing pressure, and is sensitive to a wide range of sounds, from a whisper in a library to an explosion of TNT. They modeled their device after the extraordinarily acute hearing of orcas. (J. Acoust. Soc. Am.)

26 June

  - A new gene-editing technique provides the first published successful healing of a genetic condition in a live animal, by curing mice of haemophilia B. (The Guardian) (Nature News) (Nature)
  - Österplana 065 meteorite is found in Sweden. (Meteoritical Bulletin)
- 27 June – A new bacterium is reported to have been produced from an engineered DNA sequence, in which thymine was replaced by the synthetic building block 5-chlorouracil – a substance "toxic to other organisms". (Angew. Chem.)
- 28 June – The United Nations Food and Agriculture Organization holds a ceremony in Rome, declaring the once-widespread cattle disease rinderpest to be globally eradicated.(The New York Times) (FAO)
- 30 June – Computer corporation IBM develops a form of 'instantaneous' memory, 100 times faster than flash memory. (Engadget)

=== July ===
7 July 2011: Swedish surgeons successfully carry out the world's first artificial organ transplant, giving a cancer patient a new, lab-grown trachea.

- 1 July – Based on results from the Tevatron particle accelerator, scientists have reported stronger evidence that a small excess of matter over antimatter was present during the Big Bang as particles decayed. (BBC) (Phys. Rev. D)
- 3 July
  - China's monopoly over rare-earth metals could be challenged by the discovery of massive deposits of these widely used minerals on the floor of the Pacific Ocean, a new study suggests. (Nat. Geosci.)
  - Warming oceans will melt glaciers quicker than expected, according to a new study. As oceans heat up, they could erode ice sheets much faster than warmer air alone. (LiveScience) (Nat. Geosci.)
- 7 July
  - Surgeons in Sweden have carried out the world's first synthetic organ transplant, using an artificial windpipe coated in stem cells. (BBC) (Karolinska Hospital)
  - Global investment in renewable energy sources grew by 32% during 2010 to reach a record level of US$211 billion, according to a UN study. Reportedly, the main drivers of investment growth were wind farms in China and rooftop solar panels in Europe. (BBC) (UNEP)
  - The molecular basis for the breakage of DNA, an important process in the development of cancer, has been identified by Hebrew University of Jerusalem scientists. (The Jerusalem Post) (Mol. Cell)
- 9 July – Researchers have reprogrammed brain cells to become heart cells. (PNAS)
- 10 July – An international team of scientists based in Scotland have decoded the full DNA sequence of the potato, one of the world's most important staple crops, for the first time. (BBC) (Nature)
- 12 July
  - A computer has learned language by playing strategy games, inferring the meaning of words without human supervision. (MIT) (ACL)
  - Researchers at the University of Cambridge have identified a part of the brain associated with empathy which may be a 'biomarker' for a familial risk of autism. (Transl. Psychiatry)
  - The planet Neptune completes its first orbit since it was discovered in 1846.

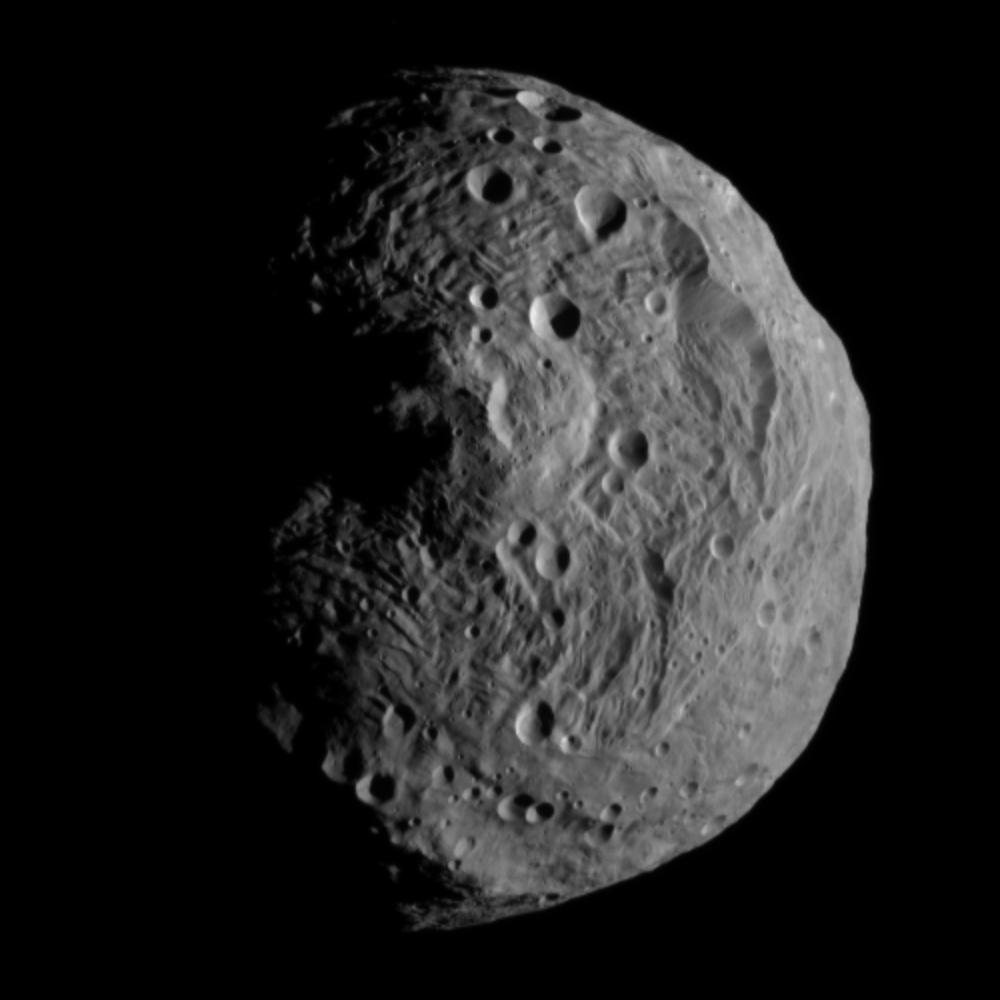
16 July 2011: NASA's Dawn spacecraft successfully enters orbit around the asteroid 4 Vesta (pictured).

- 13 July
  - A string of a dozen underwater volcanoes, several of them active, has been found near Antarctica, the first such discovery in that region. (Yahoo!)
  - Technicians from Kagawa University demonstrate a bionic mouth that replicates almost all the human organs that are required for singing. (IEEE Spectrum)
- 14 July – A "fountain of youth" that sustains the production of new neurons in the brains of rodents may also be present in the human brain, researchers have found. (Neuron)
- 16 July
  - NASA's Dawn probe enters orbit around the asteroid 4 Vesta. (BBC) (NASA)
  - Japanese company Sumitomo Electric Industries develops a new material which they believe can improve the range of electric vehicles by 300%. (Inhabitat) (Suitomo Electric)
- 19 July
  - Russia's RadioAstron, the largest orbital radio telescope yet constructed, is successfully launched into Earth orbit. (BBC)
  - It is announced the Herschel Space Observatory has discovered a dense ribbon of gas and dust more than 600 light years across at the centre of the Milky Way galaxy. (Herschel)
- 20 July
  - The Hubble Space Telescope discovers another moon orbiting Pluto. (IAU)
  - An experiment at the Fermi National Accelerator Laboratory has revealed a heavy relative of the neutron. (LiveScience) (FermiLab) (Phys. Rev. Lett.)
  - The world's most powerful "split magnet" – one that is made in two halves with holes in the middle to observe experiments – has been built in the US. It operates at 25 Tesla, equivalent to 500,000 times the strength of Earth's magnetic field. (BBC)
- 21 July
  - Space Shuttle Atlantis completes STS-135, the 135th and final mission of the Space Shuttle program. (Spaceflight Now)
  - A 120-million-year-old fossil is the oldest pregnant lizard ever discovered, according to scientists. The fossil, found in China, is a very complete 30-cm (12-in)-long specimen with more than a dozen embryos in its body. (BBC) (Naturwissenschaften)
  - Researchers at the University of Minnesota have discovered a gene required to maintain male gender throughout life. (Medical Xpress) (Nature)

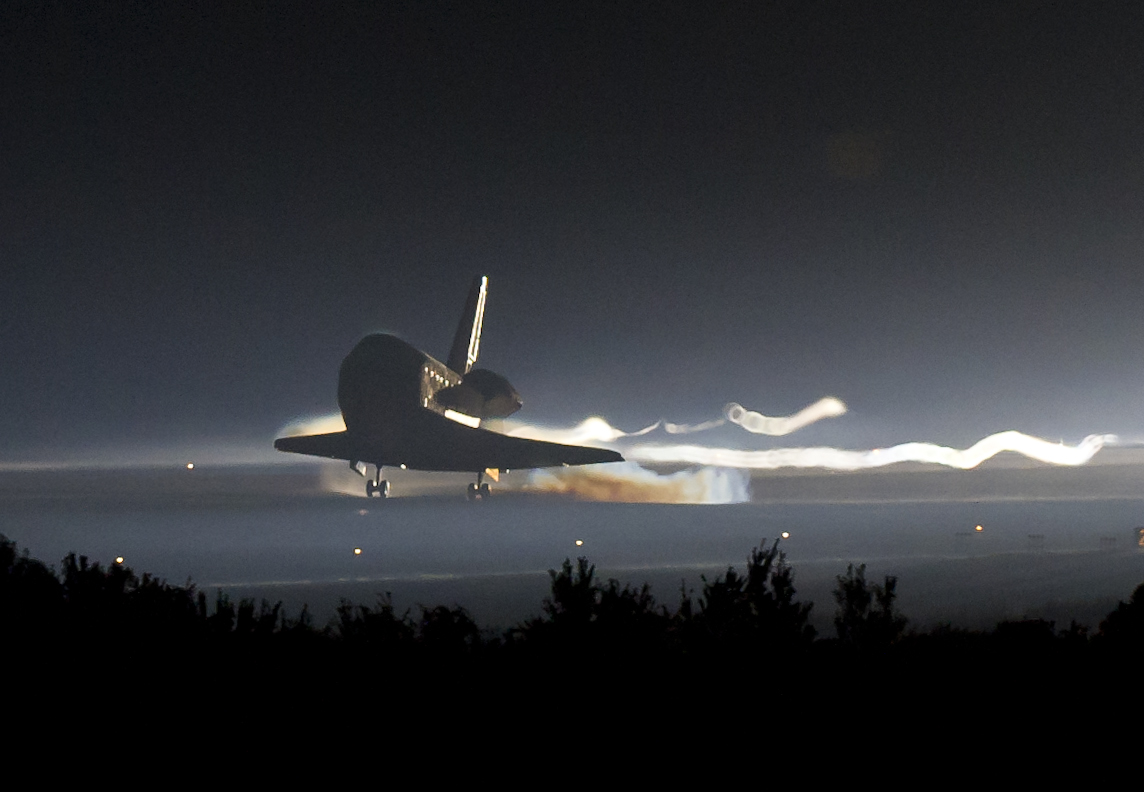
21 July 2011: the final mission of the Space Shuttle program, STS-135, ends with the landing of Space Shuttle Atlantis (pictured) at Kennedy Space Center.

- 26 July
  - Using silicon lithography, liquid silicone, and electrodes that are fashioned into patterns invisible to the naked eye, researchers at Stanford University have created transparent electric batteries. (Technology Review) (PNAS)
  - DNA circuits have been used to make a neural network and to store memories. (Ars Technica) (Nature)
- 28 July – A Chinese fossil of a previously unknown bird-like dinosaur is estimated by scientists to be about 155 million years old – five million years older than Archaeopteryx, which for 150 years has been assumed to be the world's earliest bird. (Daily Telegraph) (Nature)
- 29 July – A major clinical trial will investigate whether stem cells can be safely used to stop or even reverse the damage caused by multiple sclerosis. (BBC)

=== August ===
- 3 August – Researchers suggest that Earth once had a small second Moon that was destroyed in a slow-motion collision with the far side of its larger companion. (BBC) (Nature)
- 4 August
  - New images from the Mars Reconnaissance Orbiter appear to show evidence of flowing, liquid water on Mars. (BBC) (Science)
  - A ring of antiprotons is detected around the Earth. (New Scientist) (Next Big Future) (Astrophys. J. Lett.)
  - Artificial sperm are created using stem cells for the first time, in a scientific breakthrough that could lead to new treatments for infertile men. (Daily Telegraph) (Cell)
- 5 August
  - The solar-powered probe Juno is launched from Kennedy Space Center on a five-year mission to Jupiter. (BBC) (NASA)
  - Bypassing stem cells, scientists have made neurons directly from human skin. (Cell)
  - Scientists have developed a new class of molecules that target cells' entry systems to ensure harmful organisms do not gain access. The molecules, nicknamed pitstops, could lead to new therapeutic approaches to prevent the spread of viral and bacterial infections. (ABC Science) (Cell)
- 6 August – A study postulates that the demise of the world's forests 250 million years ago was likely accelerated by aggressive tree-killing fungi, who flourished in conditions brought about by global climate change. (Geology)

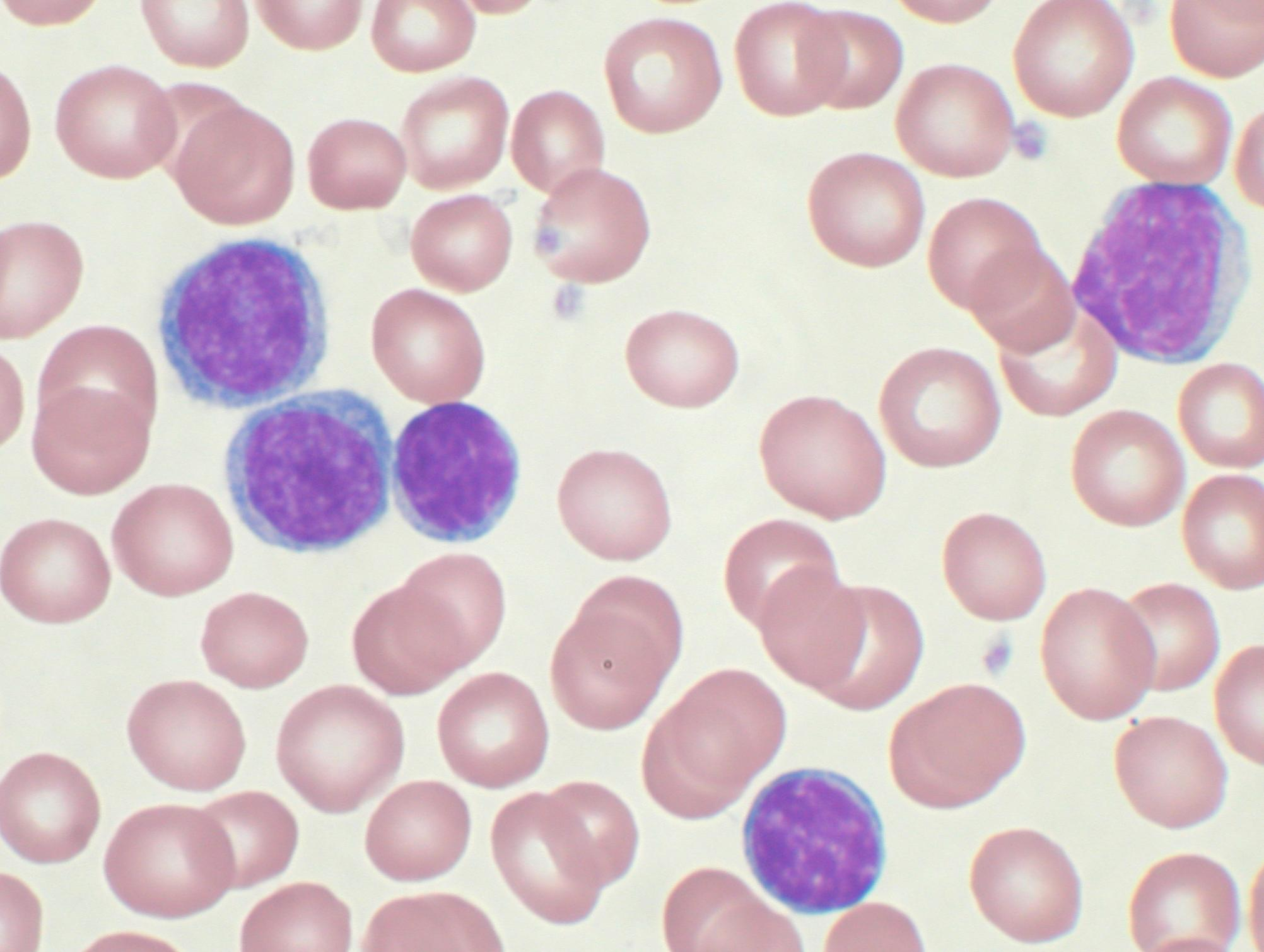
10 August 2011: a new gene therapy successfully kills off leukemia lymphocytes (pictured) in three advanced patients.

- 8 August – A report, based on NASA analysis of meteorites found on Earth, suggests that the building blocks of DNA (adenine, guanine and related organic molecules) may have been formed in outer space. (PNAS)
- 10 August – A new gene therapy that has successfully neutralized advanced cases of chronic lymphocytic leukemia (CLL) in 3 patients is published. (Fox News) (NEJM) (Scientific American)
- 11 August
  - Researchers say they have created the first-ever animal with artificial information in its genetic code. The technique, they say, could give biologists "atom-by-atom control" over the molecules in living organisms. (BBC) (J. Am. Chem. Soc.)
  - Arctic ice might be thinning four times faster than predicted by the IPCC, according to a new study by MIT's Department of Earth, Atmosphere, and Planetary Sciences (EAPS). (MIT) (J. Geophys. Res.)
  - Scientists have shown how an enzyme from a microbe can quickly and cheaply produce hydrogen from water. Hydrogen is seen as vital to future energy systems, but its production has previously been too costly and time-consuming to be viable on a large scale. (BBC) (Science)
- 12 August – An ultra-thin, flexible electronic circuit that can be stuck to the skin like a temporary tattoo is developed, with possible applications in cellphone and mobile computing technology. (The Independent) (Science)
- 16 August
  - Private donors, including actress Jodie Foster, raise enough money to re-open the mothballed SETI radio telescope array, allowing SETI to continue its search for extraterrestrial intelligence. (BBC)
  - A study of fossilised plants suggests that woody plants first appeared on the Earth about 10 million years earlier than previously thought. (BBC) (Science)
  - Taiwanese researchers report that 15 minutes of exercise a day can boost life expectancy by three years and cut death risk by 14%. (BBC) (The Lancet)
- 17 August
  - DARPA is offering $500,000 to study what it would take—organizationally, technically, sociologically and ethically—to send humans to another star, a challenge of such magnitude that the study alone could take a hundred years. (The New York Times)
  - Researchers at the University of Edinburgh state that near-death experiences are the work of neural pathway disturbances caused by a disruption of the oxygen supply to the brain, and are not supernatural events. (Scientific American) (Trends Cogn. Sci.)
- 18 August
  - IBM has developed a microprocessor which it claims comes closer than ever to replicating the human brain. The system is capable of "rewiring" its connections as it encounters new information, similar to the way biological synapses work. (BBC) Comm. ACM
  - Within decades, solar storms are likely to become more disruptive to planes and spacecraft, say researchers at Reading University. (BBC) (Geophys. Res. Lett.)

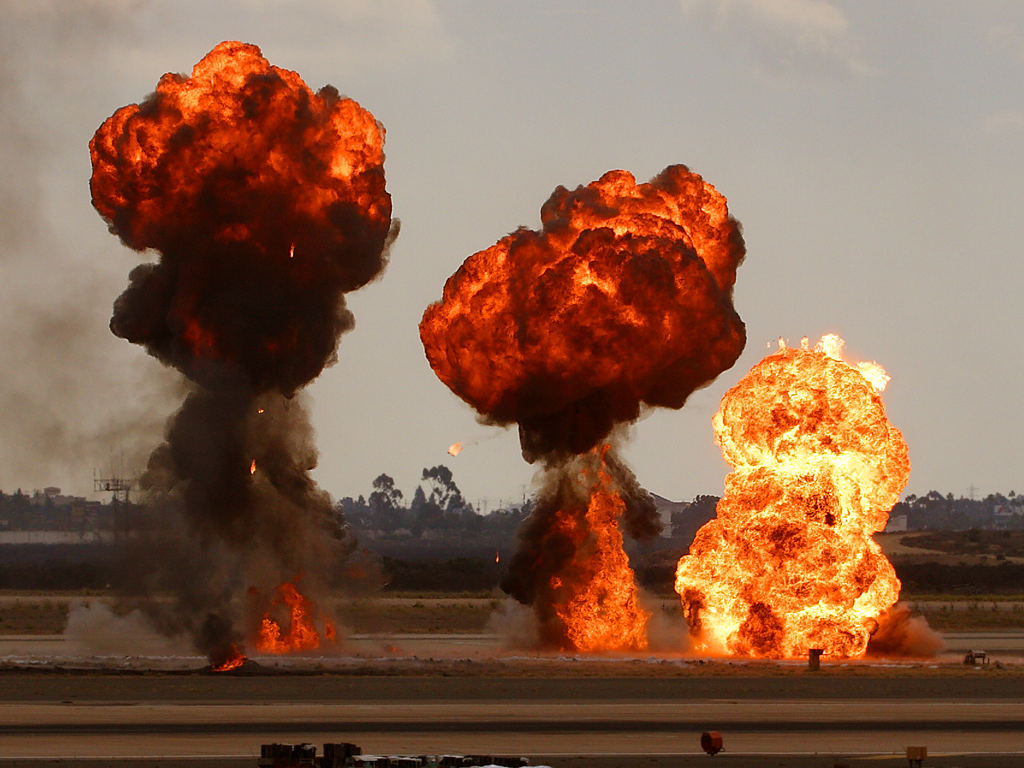
19 August 2011: the American Office of Naval Research successfully tests a new class of conventional explosive, reportedly five times more powerful than existing explosives.

- 19 August – The US Office of Naval Research says that it has successfully tested a new type of explosive material that can dramatically increase weapons' impacts. Missiles made from the high-density substance can explode with up to five times the energy of existing explosives. (BBC)
- 22 August – American researchers prototype a basic form of bulletproof skin, based on genetically modified silkworm threads. (Police One)
- 23 August
  - The natural world contains about 8.7 million species, according to a new estimate described by scientists as the most accurate ever. However, the vast majority of these species have not been identified – cataloguing them all could take more than 1,000 years. (BBC) (PLoS Biol.)
  - Computer simulations suggest that violent asteroid impacts flinging life from Earth to other planets is more likely than previously thought. (BBC) (ArXiv)
- 24 August – Antibiotics' impact on gut bacteria is permanent—and so serious in its long-term consequences that medicine should consider whether to restrict the prescription of antibiotics to pregnant women and young children, according to a new study. (Wired) (Nature)
- 25 August – A monkey sporting a ginger beard and matching fiery red tail, discovered in a threatened region of the Brazilian Amazon, is believed to be a species new to science. (The Guardian)
- 26 August – An atomic clock at the UK's National Physical Laboratory (NPL) has the best long-term accuracy of any clock in the world, researchers from NPL and Penn State University have found. (BBC) (Metrologia)
- 29 August – Japanese scientists announce an innovation in wind turbine technology, the wind lens, which could triple the energy output of wind turbines, making wind energy affectively cheaper than nuclear energy. (Mother Nature Network) (Kyushu University)
- 31 August
  - An engineered virus, injected into the blood, can selectively target and destroy cancer cells throughout the body, in what researchers have labelled a medical first. (BBC) (Nature)
  - A pill to prevent sunburn is being developed, using coral's natural defence against the sun's harmful ultraviolet rays. (BBC)
  - Graphene, the strongest known material on Earth, could help boost broadband internet speed, say researchers. (BBC)
  - AMD has broken the world overclocking speed record, thanks to the use of liquid nitrogen and liquid helium coolant. The company achieved an overclocked frequency of 8.429 GHz on a near-production, eight-core AMD FX 8150 Bulldozer processor sample. (eweek europe)

=== September ===
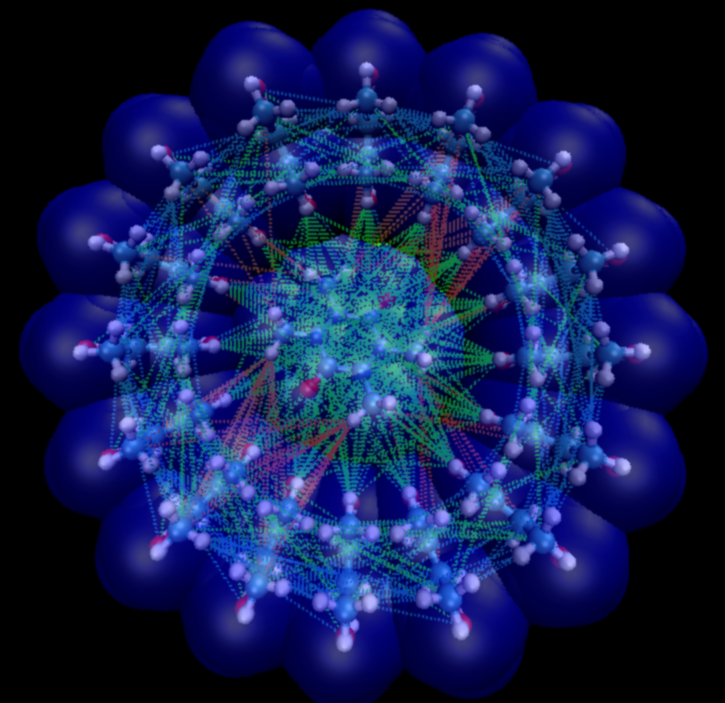
2 September 2011: scientists create a working electric motor made from a single molecule (molecular-scale computer pictured).

- 2 September
  - Researchers create the smallest electric motor yet devised, made from a single molecule around a nanometre across. The invention could have applications in both nanotechnology and medicine. (BBC) (Nat. Nanotechnol.)
  - Researchers report two major breakthroughs in quantum computing—a quantum system built on the familiar von Neumann processor-memory architecture, and a working digital quantum simulator built on a quantum-computer platform. (PopSci) (Science-1) (Science-2)
  - Yale University researchers have discovered the source of signals that trigger hair growth, an insight that may lead to new treatments for baldness. (Cell)
  - Scientists map the taste cortex in mice, pinpointing the brain regions that detect certain flavors. (PopSci) (Science)
  - Researchers suggest that dry desert planets might be the most common type of habitable planet in the galaxy, rather than watery planets such as Earth. (Astrobiology)
  - Challacombe scale for a clinical oral dryness score introduced. (Br. Dent. J.)
- 8 September
  - Cuban medical authorities release CimaVax-EGF, the first therapeutic vaccine for lung cancer. The vaccine was the result of a 25-year research project at Havana's Center of Molecular Immunology. (Xinhua)
  - University of Glasgow scientists have taken their first tentative steps towards creating "life" from inorganic chemical cells, potentially defining the new area of "inorganic biology." (New Scientist) (Angew. Chem.)
- 9 September – Feeding a supercomputer with news stories could help predict major world events, according to US researchers. (BBC) (First Monday)
- 12 September
  - Arctic sea ice has melted to a historic low, researchers from the University of Bremen in Germany report. (CNN) (AMSR-E)
  - Astronomers using the European Southern Observatory's HARPS instrument announce the discovery of more than 50 new exoplanets – including 16 super-Earths – with one planet reportedly orbiting at the edge of the habitable zone of its star. By studying the properties of all the HARPS planets found so far, the team has found that about 40% of stars similar to the Sun have at least one planet lighter than Saturn. (ESO)

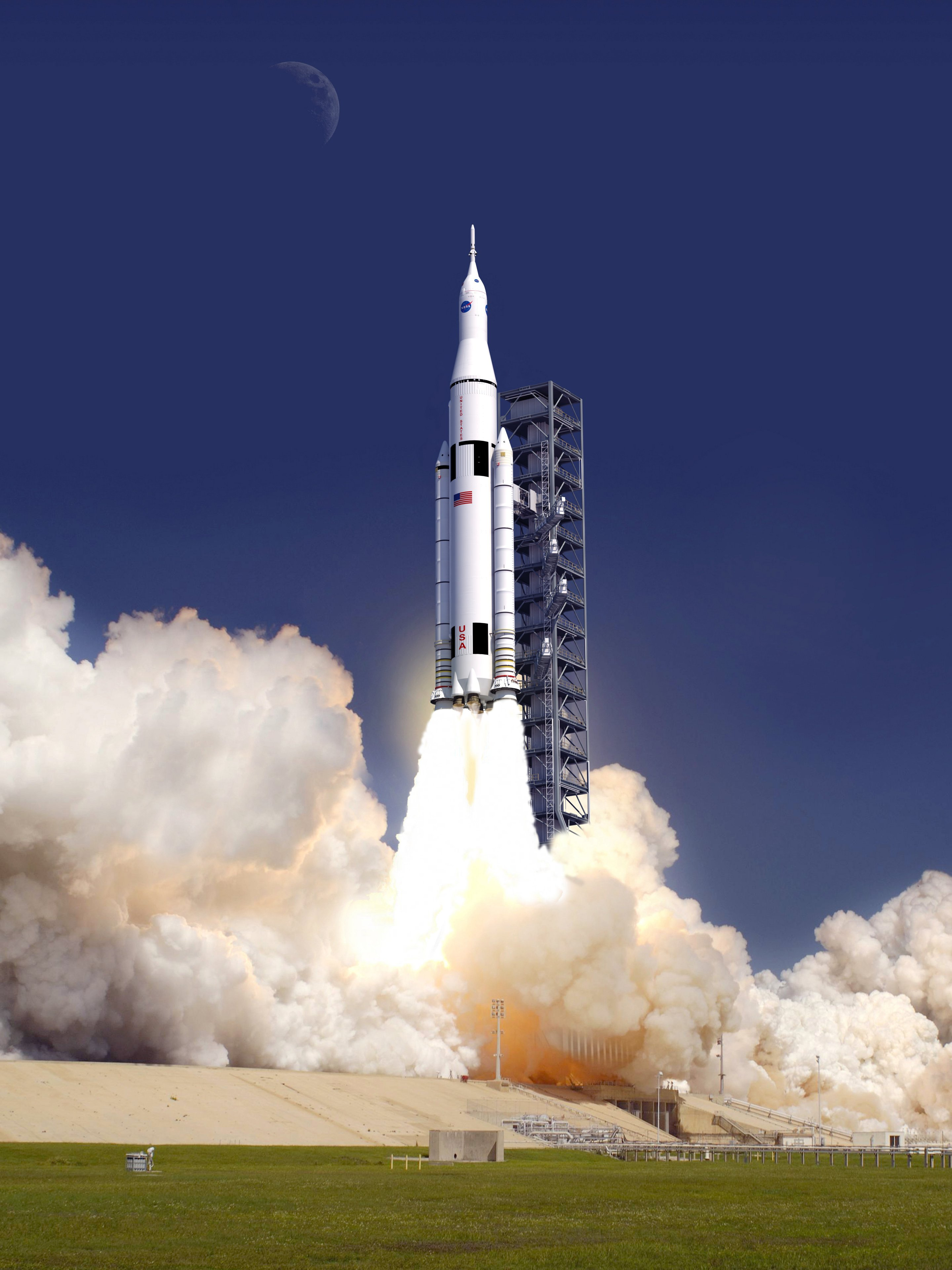
14 September 2011: NASA publishes the design of its future heavy-lift rocket, the Space Launch System (concept art shown).

- 13 September
  - The relative risks to the supply of some of Earth's rarest elements have been detailed in a new list published by the British Geological Survey (BGS). (BBC) (BGS)
  - Researchers have developed a sophisticated camera system able to detect lies by watching facial movements during speech. (BBC)
- 14 September
  - NASA unveils the design for a new heavy-lift rocket to take humans to Mars and the asteroids. (BBC)
  - Researchers may have discovered how to safely open and close the blood–brain barrier, offering a new way to safely deliver therapies to treat Alzheimer's disease, multiple sclerosis and cancers of the central nervous system directly to the brain. (Medical Xpress) (J. Neurosci.)
- 15 September – A piece of amber discovered in Alberta, Canada, contains an 80-million-year-old feather that could provide clues to the relationship between dinosaurs and modern avian species. (CBC) (Science)
- 16 September
  - Scientists' predictions about the formation and characteristics of dark matter have been shaken by research into dwarf galaxies surrounding the Milky Way. (BBC)
  - Artificial blood vessels made on a 3D printer may soon be used for transplants of lab-created organs. (BBC)
- 19 September – People with schizophrenia are six times more likely to develop epilepsy, reports a Taiwanese study, which found a strong relationship between the two diseases. (BBC) (Epilepsia)
- 20 September – US researchers say they have demonstrated how fuel cells powered by bacteria can be "self-powered" and produce a limitless supply of hydrogen for hydrogen cars. (BBC) (PNAS)
- 22 September
  - An international team of scientists at CERN records neutrino particles apparently traveling faster than the speed of light. If confirmed, the discovery would overturn Albert Einstein's 1905 special theory of relativity, which says that nothing can travel faster than light. (BBC) (ArXiv)
  - A non-disease-causing virus kills human breast cancer cells in the laboratory, creating opportunities for potential new cancer therapies, according to Penn State College of Medicine researchers who tested the virus on three different breast cancer types. (Pennsylvania State University)
- 24 September – NASA's Upper Atmosphere Research Satellite (UARS) deorbits and impacts the Pacific Ocean, having been decommissioned in 2005. UARS, which was launched in 1991, was designed for the study of Earth's atmosphere, particularly the ozone layer. (NASA)
- 26 September – Researchers have demonstrated that electrons can move freely in layers of linked semiconductor nanoparticles under the influence of light. This discovery may assist the development of cheap and efficient quantum dot solar cells. (Nat. Nanotechnol.)
- 27 September
  - Scientists have successfully replaced an injured part of a rat's brain with a synthetic substitute. (New Scientist) (SENS Foundation)
  - Scientists have created a nanostructure which can multiply stem cells used in therapies – a first step towards developing large-scale stem cell culture factories. (Labmate online) (Nat. Mater.)
- 29 September
  - A rocket carrying China's first space laboratory module, Tiangong-1, is successfully launched, marking the start of the Tiangong program to create a modular space station. (BBC)
  - A new method for self-healing materials is presented, inspired by mammalian vasculature. (BBC) (J. R. Soc. Interface)
  - Geothermal power plants could help produce lithium for electric cars, by way of a new process which extracts lithium from the brines used to generate electricity in a geothermal power plant. (Scientific American)
- 30 September
  - Scientists release the most accurate simulation of the structure of the universe to date. (YouTube) (Astrophys. J.)
  - Boston Dynamics unveils its AlphaDog military transport robot, a larger, faster and quieter version of its BigDog prototype. The legged robot can carry up to 400 pounds (180 kg) of cargo, and is designed to support infantry in rough terrain. (TechCrunch)

=== October ===
- 3 October
  - The 2011 Nobel Prize in Physiology or Medicine is shared by Bruce Beutler of the United States, Jules A. Hoffmann of France and Ralph M. Steinman of Canada (posthumously), for their research into the human immune system. (AP via New Zealand Herald) (BBC)
  - The Atacama Large Millimeter Array in Chile – the largest and most complex radio telescope ever built – begins operations. (BBC)
- 4 October – The 2011 Nobel Prize in Physics is shared by Drs Adam Riess, Saul Perlmutter and Brian Schmidt for their discoveries relating to dark energy. (The New York Times)
- 5 October
  - The 2011 Nobel Prize in Chemistry is awarded to Professor Dan Shechtman of Iowa State University for the discovery of quasicrystals. (The New York Times)
  - A form of cloning has been used to create personalised embryonic stem cells in humans, according to American researchers. (BBC) (Nature)
- 6 October – A "smart pill" has been developed that is able to record accurate information about internal conditions in the gut, such as acidity, pressure and temperature. (The Yorkshire Post)
- 7 October – Data from the ESA's Venus Express probe reveals that the planet Venus has an ozone layer in its upper atmosphere. (BBC)
- 10 October
  - UK doctors report that the antibiotic normally used to treat gonorrhoea is no longer effective, because the sexually transmitted disease is now largely resistant to it. (BBC) (HPA)
  - Exercise is equally effective at preventing migraines as drugs, a Swedish study suggests.(Cephalalgia)

12 October 2011: scientists reconstruct the genome of the Black Death which devastated Europe in the 14th century.

- 12 October
  - The genetic code of the germ that caused the 14th-century Black Death has been reconstructed by scientists for the first time. The British researchers extracted DNA fragments of the ancient bacterium from the teeth of medieval corpses found in London. (BBC) (Nature)
  - Ginger supplements may boost digestive and colon health, according to a new study. (Los Angeles Times) (Cancer Prev. Res.)
- 13 October – Silencing a protein known as BCL11A can reactivate fetal hemoglobin production in adult mice and effectively reverse sickle cell disease, according to a new study. (MedicalXpress) (Science)
- 14 October
  - Seven vehicle manufacturers in Europe and the US have agreed to adopt a standardised, universal charging system for electric vehicles. (New Scientist) (Ford)
  - Using carbon nanotubes, researchers have created artificial muscles that can twist 1,000 times more than any similar material made in the past—a development that could prove useful in robotics and prosthetic limbs. (Technology Review) (Science)
- 16 October – For the first time, researchers have found a way to inject a precise dose of a gene therapy agent directly into a single living cell without using a needle. The technique uses electricity to fire therapeutic biomolecules through a tiny channel and into a cell in a fraction of a second. (Nat. Nanotechnol.)
- 17 October – The world's first commercial spaceport, Spaceport America, is opened by Virgin Group chairman Richard Branson in the U.S. state of New Mexico. The SpaceShipTwo spaceplane is expected to begin commercial flights from the spaceport by 2013. (BBC)
- 18 October
  - The World Health Organization reports that global malaria deaths have fallen by 20% since 2001, claiming that over 30 countries are on course to eradicate the mosquito-borne disease by 2020. The fall in deaths is believed to be the result of improved diagnostic technologies and wider use of malaria vaccines. (BBC) (WHO)
  - A malaria vaccine has shown promising results in a clinical trial in Africa. (BBC) (NEJM)
  - Europe's highest court, the European Court of Justice, has ruled that stem cells from human embryos cannot be patented, in a case that could have major implications for stem cell research and regenerative medicine. (BBC)
  - Spanish engineers have developed a machine that uses artificial vision and UV rays to scan through citrus fruits and detect rotten ones. (BBC) (Food Bioprocess Technol.)
  - Joseph Fourier University have developed a biofuel cell that can generate electricity from glucose and oxygen. This could allow patients to power their own medical implants. (BBC)
- 19 October
  - British computer chip designer ARM unveils the Cortex A7 processor, which should allow manufacturers to make cheaper and more efficient smartphones. (BBC)
  - Imperial College London researchers have shown logic gates can be built out of E. coli bacteria and DNA. This could be used to make sophisticated diagnostic cells that assess and treat illness in the body. ] (Nat. Commun.)
- 21 October
  - The Earth's surface is undeniably warming, according to a detailed new analysis by an American scientific group. (BBC) (Berkeley Earth Project)
  - Further research has been published suggesting there is no link between mobile phones and brain cancer. The latest study looked at more than 350,000 mobile phone users over an 18-year period. (BBC) (BMJ)
  - The first two satellites of the Galileo satellite navigation system are launched from Guiana Space Center by the European Space Agency. The Galileo system is intended to reduce Europe's reliance on America's dominant Global Positioning System (GPS). (Bloomberg) (ESA)
- 24 October – India's Minister of Health, Ghulam Nabi Azad, reports that the country has almost entirely eradicated polio through a vaccination program which immunises over 170 million children every year. No new polio cases have been reported in India for over nine months. (BBC)

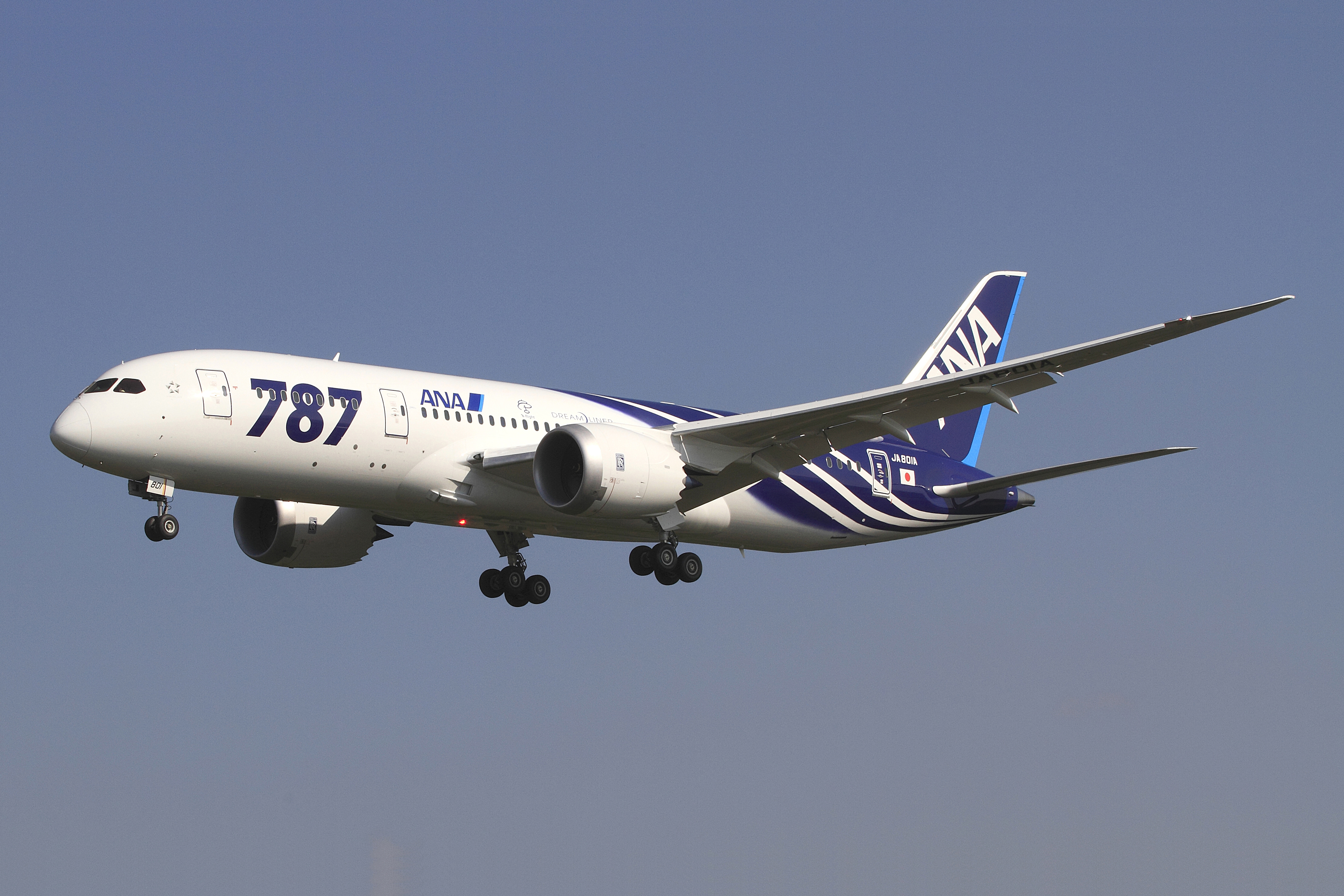
26 October 2011: the Boeing 787 Dreamliner, the first major airliner to significantly incorporate composite materials, completes its first commercial flight.

- 25 October
  - Human DNA may carry a 'memory' of living conditions in childhood, according to a new study. (Science Blog) (Int. J. Epidemiol.)
  - Space telescope observations indicate that the supernova RCW 86, first seen by Chinese astronomers in 185 AD, expanded at an unprecedented rate due to the formation of a vacuum-like "cavity" around it in the early stages of the death of its star. The expansion of the supernova, which was visible even in daylight when first discovered, has remained a mystery for nearly 2,000 years. (BBC) (Astrophys. J.)
  - The last of the United States' B53 nuclear warheads is disassembled near Amarillo, Texas. The nine-megaton bomb, which first entered service in 1962, was formerly the most powerful nuclear weapon in the country's nuclear arsenal, possessing nearly 600 times the yield of the Little Boy atomic bomb that destroyed Hiroshima in 1945. (New York Daily News) (subscription required)
- 26 October
  - The Boeing 787 Dreamliner, a composite-based airliner with up to 20% greater fuel efficiency than previous models, completes its first commercial flight for All Nippon Airways, after a three-year production delay. (BBC)
  - American scientists confirm that an infectious fungus, Geomyces destructans, is responsible for the incurable white-nose syndrome that has decimated bat populations across North America since 2006. (BBC) (Nature)
  - Scientists at the University of Hong Kong have found that the cosmic dust permeating the universe contains complex organic matter, described as "amorphous organic solids with a mixed aromatic-aliphatic structure". Such organic matter could be created naturally, and rapidly, by stars. (Space.com) (Nature)
- 27 October
  - Researchers in Oxford, England, begin human trials of a pioneering gene therapy technique, which is hoped to provide a cure for crippling ocular defects such as retinal choroideremia. (BBC)
  - New measurements reveal that the dwarf planet Eris is almost identical in size to Pluto, which was deemed to be a dwarf planet in 2006. (Wired) (ESO)

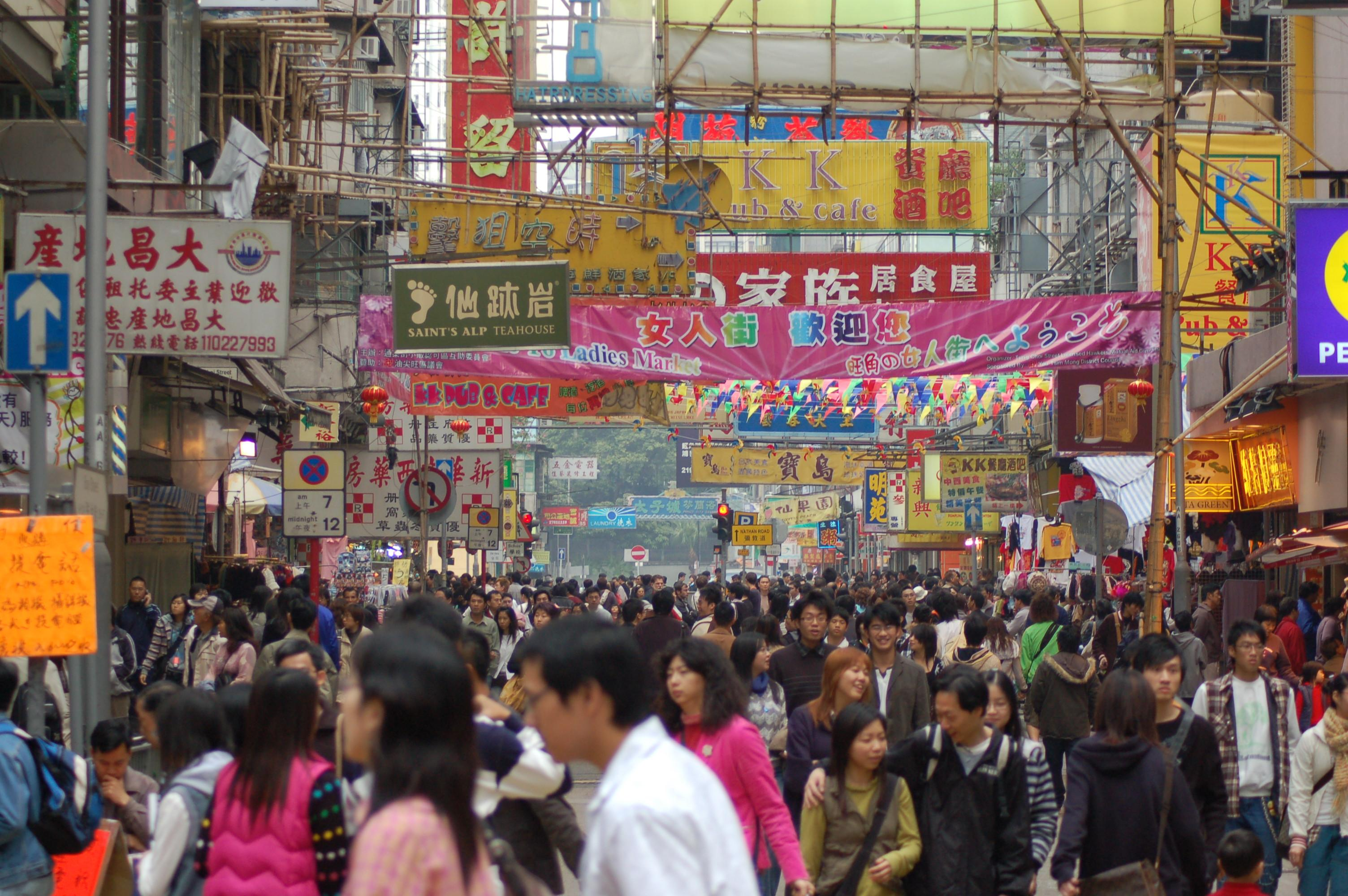
31 October 2011: the world population reaches seven billion, according to a United Nations estimate.

- 28 October
  - British scientists report that a daily dose of aspirin can reduce the incidence of bowel cancer in people at high risk of the disease. (BBC) (The Lancet)
  - Human-caused climate change is already a major factor in more frequent Mediterranean droughts, according to a new study, which shows that the magnitude and frequency of drying is too great to be explained by natural variability alone. (NOAA) (J. Clim.)
  - NASA launches the NPOESS Preparatory Project – the first of its next generation of polar-orbiting satellites dedicated to gathering weather and climate data. (BBC) (NASA)
- 29 October – CERN researchers attempt to repeat a recent experiment that apparently yielded faster-than-light neutrinos, using a more efficient system of measurement to validate their results. (The Guardian)
- 31 October
  - An investigation into social-psychology research papers uncovered massive amount of academic fraud at Dutch Universities. At least 30 papers by psychologist Diederik Stapel are found to have been faked.
  - The world population reaches seven billion, according to the United Nations. (The Guardian)

=== November ===
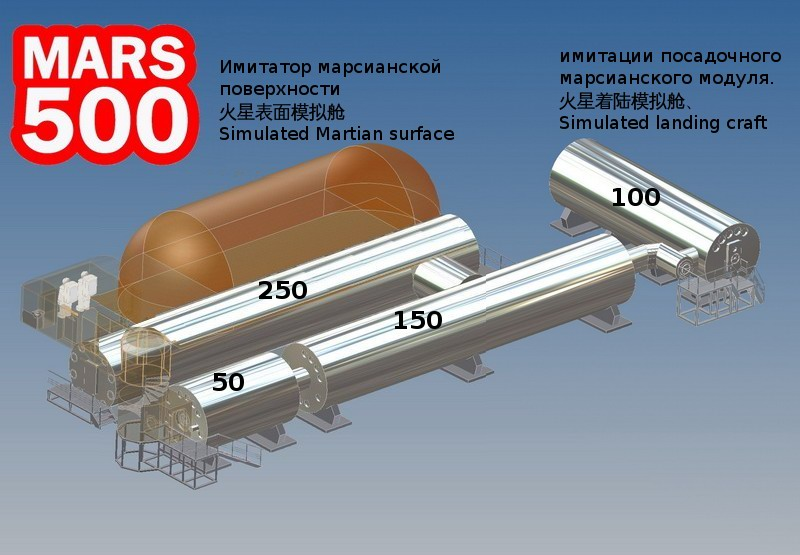
4 November 2011: the MARS-500 isolation experiment (facility diagram shown) ends in Moscow, having simulated a 520-day human mission to Mars.

- 1 November
  - India announces plans for a prototype nuclear power plant that uses thorium – an innovative, potentially safer nuclear fuel. (The Guardian)
  - Scientists have transformed age-worn cells in people over 90 – including a centenarian – into rejuvenated stem cells that are "indistinguishable" from those found in embryos. (Medical Xpress) (Genes Dev.)
- 2 November
  - China's uncrewed Shenzhou 8 spacecraft robotically docks with the orbiting Tiangong-1 space station module, marking China's first orbital docking, and a major milestone in its efforts to construct a full-scale space station by 2020. (BBC)
  - American researchers delay, and in some cases even eliminate, the onset of age-related symptoms such as wrinkles, muscle wasting and cataracts in mice. The development may have significant implications for the study and treatment of such symptoms in humans. (BBC) (Nature)
  - Morocco is chosen as the first location for Desertec – a German-led, €400bn project to build a vast network of solar and windfarms across North Africa and the Middle East, with the aim of providing 15% of Europe's electricity supply by 2050. (The Guardian)
- 4 November
  - Six men emerge from the 520-day MARS-500 isolation experiment, which aimed to simulate a human mission to Mars. The experiment, undertaken at a Moscow scientific institute, was intended to investigate the isolation of long-duration spaceflight and its effects on the human body and mind. (BBC)
  - A 20-year-old alternative solar cell design using dye-sensitized nanocrystal cells (DSC) could lead to cheap, printable cells, revolutionising solar power use worldwide, according to a new study. (KurzweilAI) (J. Am. Chem. Soc.)
- 5 November
  - An American doctor claims that brown eyes can safely and permanently be turned blue by using short laser pulses to destroy pigment in the iris. (BBC)
  - An official White House report states that "The U.S. government has no evidence that any life exists outside our planet, or that an extraterrestrial presence has contacted or engaged any member of the human race." It furthermore asserts that there is "no credible information to suggest that any evidence is being hidden from the public's eye." Although odds are "pretty high" that there may be life on other planets, "the odds of us making contact with any of them—especially any intelligent ones—are extremely small, given the distances involved." (UniverseToday) (White House)
- 6 November – Dopamine-producing brain cells that are killed off by Parkinson's disease have been grown from stem cells and grafted into monkeys' brains by American researchers, in a major step towards new treatments for the condition. (The Guardian) (Nature)

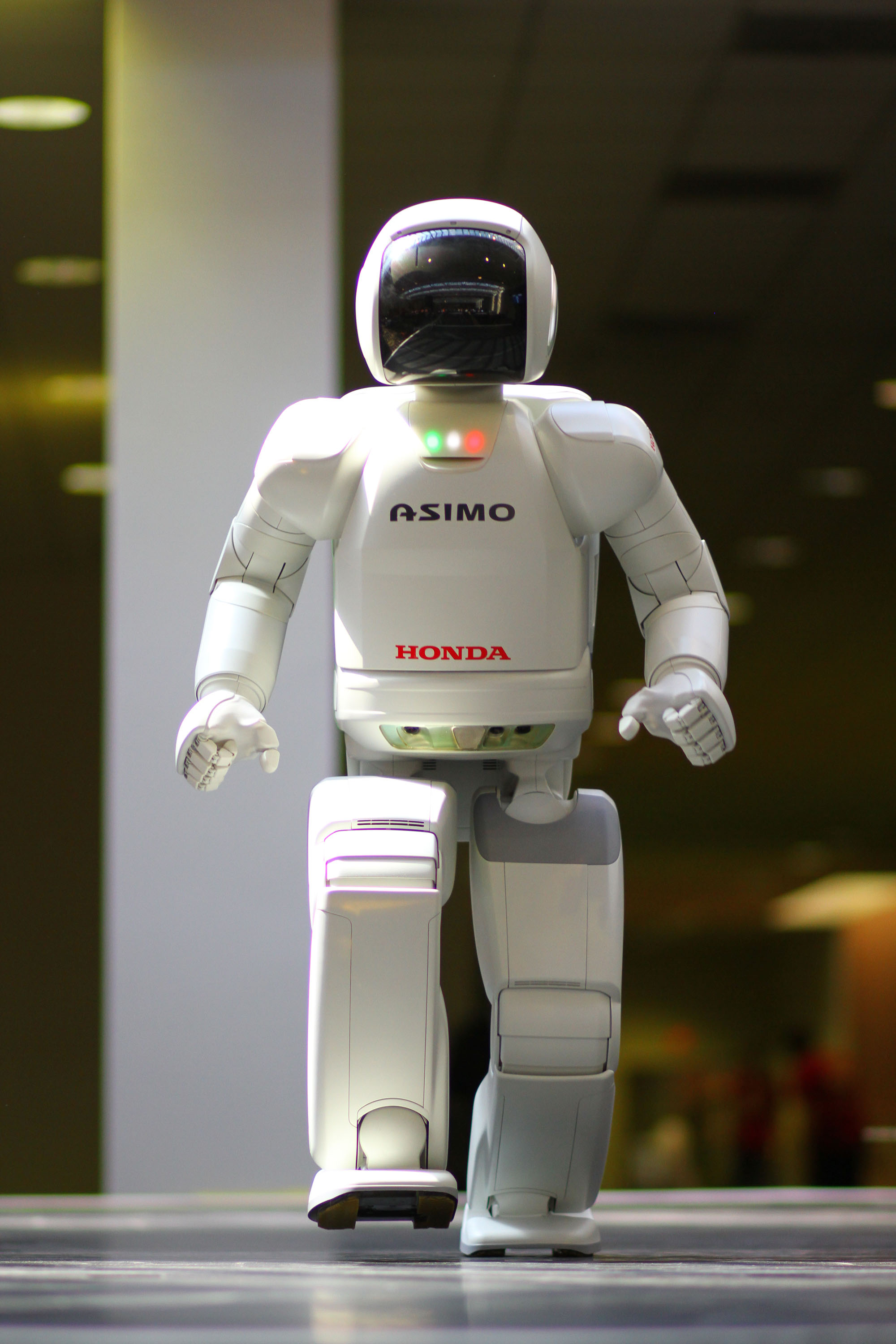
8 November 2011: Honda releases an enhanced version of its Asimo humanoid robot (earlier version pictured).

- 8 November
  - The asteroid YU_{55} makes a close Earth flyby, passing within 0.85 lunar distances (about 201,700 miles) of the Earth. YU_{55} is approximately 400 metres (1,300 ft) across, and is the largest asteroid to make a close pass since 1976. Another comparable flyby will not occur until 2028. (BBC)
  - Russia launches the Fobos-Grunt probe, marking the nation's first attempt at an interplanetary mission since 1996. The mission's goal is to obtain samples from Phobos' surface and return them to Earth in 2014. The Chinese Yinghuo-1 probe, China's first Mars-exploration spacecraft, is also launched. However, despite reaching orbit successfully, the two spacecraft are left unable to begin their journey to Mars, due to the failure of a secondary engine to ignite. (Space.com) (BBC)
  - Honda revamps its humanoid robot, Asimo, giving it enhanced artificial intelligence, the ability to move without being controlled by an operator, and a greater capability to cope with different situations. (USA Today)
  - A Scottish-designed bionic leg exoskeleton, designed to allow disabled people to walk, is approved for sale in the United Kingdom. (BBC)
- 9 November
  - Dutch scientists build a nanoscopic "electric car" made of a single complex molecule, capable of travelling small distances when an electric current is applied to it. Though currently at a rudimentary level of development, the invention may have applications in the fields of nanorobotics and molecular machinery. (BBC) (Nature)
  - A team of scientists in Japan synthesize the world's first stem-cell-derived pituitary gland. (Technology Review) (Nature)
  - If current trends continue, Earth will almost certainly suffer a mass extinction of species, according to a major new survey of 583 conservation scientists published in Conservation Biology. (Conserv. Biol.)
- 10 November
  - No wild black rhinos remain in West Africa, according to the latest global assessment of threatened species. (BBC) (IUCN)
  - British computer chip designer ARM unveils its latest graphics processing unit (GPU) for mobile devices. The Mali-T658 offers up to ten times the performance of its predecessor, and may start to appear in devices towards the end of 2013. (BBC) (ARM)
  - A method of communicating with brain-damaged patients who appear to be in a vegetative state is discovered by scientists in the UK and Belgium. (BBC) (The Lancet)
- 14 November
  - A study of heart failure patients treated with their own stem cells has achieved striking results and could result in the biggest breakthrough in a generation. (Daily Telegraph) (The Lancet)
  - Scientists have used brain scan images to create the world's first movie of the female brain as it approaches, experiences and recovers from an orgasm. (The Guardian) (Neuroscience 2011)
- 15 November
  - 95% of adults worldwide now own cellphones, according to a new study. (Market Watch)
  - British doctors report that they have cured a baby boy of a life-threatening liver disease using implanted cells which acted like a temporary liver, allowing the damaged organ to recover. The cell implant technique, developed by researchers at King's College Hospital, London, is described as a world first. (BBC)
  - American researchers report that the recharge speed of lithium-ion batteries can be significantly enhanced by making millions of tiny holes in them. The discovery could lead to laptop and cellphone batteries which recharge ten times faster and hold a charge ten times larger than current technology allows. (BBC) (Adv. Energy Mater.)
- 16 November
  - Police in Northern Ireland consider the use of airborne surveillance drones to combat crime, following the adoption of such technology by other UK police forces. Canadian drone manufacturer Aeryon Labs is cited as a potential supplier. (BBC)
  - Intel debuts an accelerator chip capable of running at speeds of one teraflop at a supercomputing conference in Seattle. The device, dubbed Knights Corner, combines 50 individual processor cores into a single chip. (BBC) (Intel)
  - A report commissioned by the State of New York warns that future Hurricane Irene-like storms could put a third of New York City under water and flood many of the tunnels leading into Manhattan in under an hour, due to the effects of climate change. (The Guardian) (NYSERDA)
  - Scientists report that estimates of the rate of amphibian population decline are too optimistic, and that populations could decline even faster than previously thought. (The Guardian) (Nature)
- 17 November
  - Researchers at the Massachusetts Institute of Technology design a computer chip that mimics the way that the human brain's neurons adapt in response to new information. (BBC) (MIT) (PNAS)
  - China's uncrewed Shenzhou 8 spacecraft returns to Earth after successfully docking with the orbiting Tiangong-1 laboratory module. The crewed Shenzhou 9 and 10 follow-up missions are expected to visit Tiangong-1 in 2012. (BBC)
  - For the first time, astronomers have produced a complete description of a black hole. The American team conducted precise measurements using ground- and orbit-based telescopes, allowing them to reconstruct the complete history of the Cygnus X-1 object from its birth some six million years ago. (Astrophys. J.)
- 18 November
  - A team of American engineers claims to have created the world's lightest material – a microlattice of metallic tubes 100 times lighter than Styrofoam, with "extraordinary" energy absorption properties. The new material may have applications in the development of next-generation batteries and shock absorbers. (BBC) (Science)
  - OPERA physicists conduct a follow-up experiment which confirms their earlier observations, first reported on 22 September 2011, of neutrinos apparently exceeding the speed of light. (The New York Times) (arXiv)
  - The U.S. Army Space and Missile Defense Command successfully tests a new hypersonic weapon system, capable of striking targets 3,700 kilometres (2,300 mi) away in under 30 minutes. The weapon was developed as part of the Prompt Global Strike program. (BBC)
  - American scientists develop an ultra-thin, ultra-flexible brain implant with resolution fifty times greater than was previously possible, designed to monitor epileptic seizures. The device could revolutionize epilepsy treatment and lead to a deeper understanding of brain function. (Technology Review) (Nat. Neurosci.)
- 19 November – A computer system able to read scientific papers in a similar way to humans promises breakthroughs in cancer research, according to scientists at Cambridge University. Called CRAB, the system is able to trawl through millions of peer-reviewed articles for clues to the causes of tumours. (The Telegraph)
- 22 November – University of Washington scientists successfully trial a new generation of contact lenses capable of projecting images in front of the eyes. Human trials are expected to follow the successful animal trials.
- 23 November – A study published in Nature shows that recent melting of Arctic sea ice is unprecedented on a historic timescale and cannot be explained by natural processes alone.
- 24 November – Japanese researchers have developed a way to illuminate tiny, hidden tumors with a fluorescent spray. Within minutes, doctors can track down residual cancer that has spread and scattered throughout the body, helping to ensure that no tumors are left behind during surgery. (Smart Planet) (Sci. Transl. Med.)

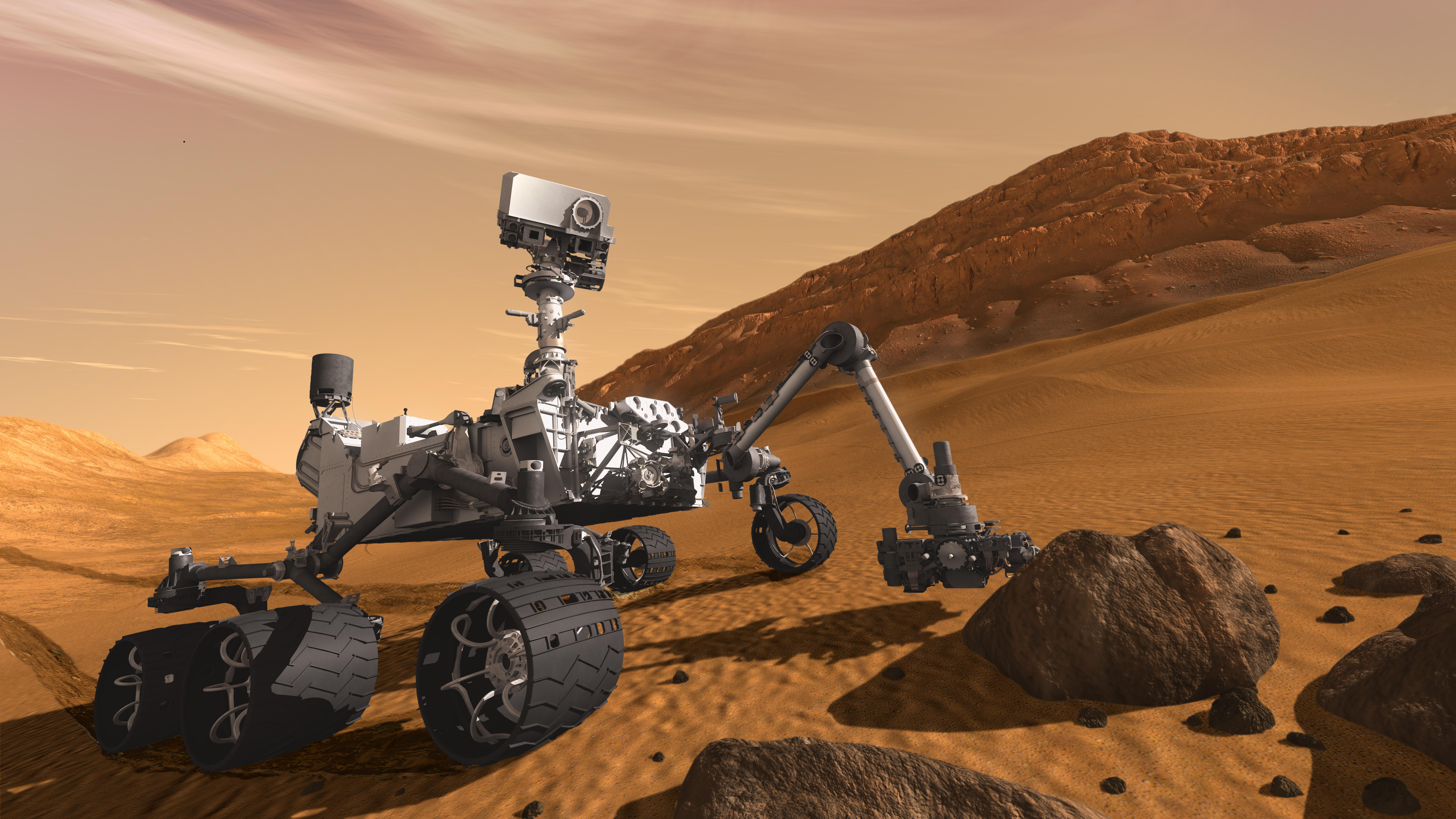
26 November 2011: NASA successfully launches its Mars Science Laboratory mission, which landed the Curiosity Mars rover (artist's impression pictured) on Mars in 2012.

- 26 November – NASA's Mars Science Laboratory mission successfully launches for Mars. The mission landed the robotic Curiosity rover on the surface of Mars in August 2012, whereupon the rover began its search for evidence of past or present life on Mars. (Chicago Tribune) (Launch Video – 04:00)
- 28 November
  - An American carbon capture and storage (CCS) project begins a three-year trial to pump one million tonnes of CO_{2} underground. (Click Green) (MGSC)
  - Swiss researchers are developing magnetic nanoparticles that could be used to remove harmful substances from the bloodstream. (Technology Review)
- 30 November
  - Researchers at Washington State University develop an artificial bone "scaffold" which can be produced using 3D printers, potentially allowing doctors to quickly print replacement bone tissue for injured patients. (BBC)
  - As the Arctic warms, thawing permafrost will release greenhouse gases faster and at significantly higher levels than previous estimates, according to survey results from 41 international scientists. (Nature)

=== December ===
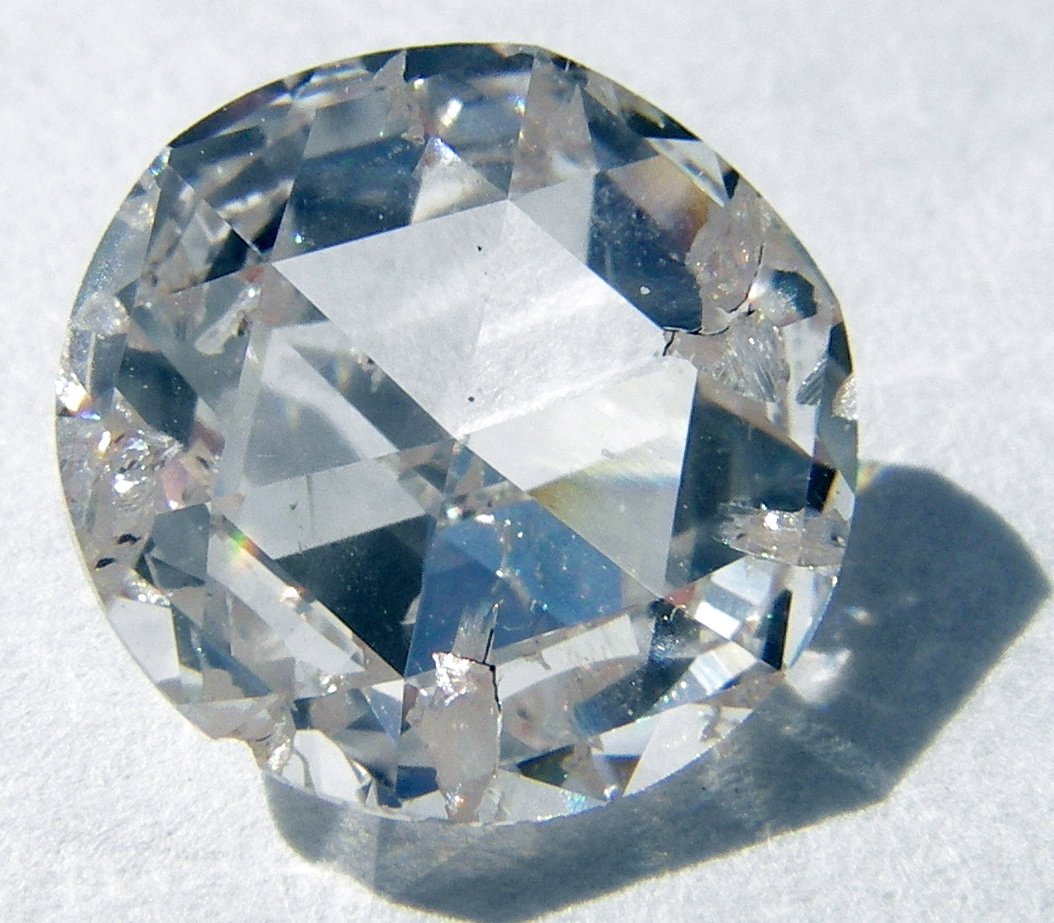
1 December 2011: Oxford University scientists successfully induce quantum entanglement in two diamonds, the first time entanglement has been achieved in objects visible to the naked eye.

- 1 December – Oxford University researchers successfully entangle two millimeter-scale diamonds using controlled laser pulses. This represents the first known instance of quantum entanglement in objects large enough to see with the naked eye. (Nature News) (Science)
- 2 December
  - Scientists suggest "flerovium" and "livermorium" as names for the newest additions to the periodic table. (BBC)
  - Researchers have created an advanced fuel cell which could give electric cars greater range, while keeping CO_{2} emissions low. (Technology Review)
  - Researchers from the London Centre for Nanotechnology (LCN) discover a property of graphene that could widen its applications in nanotechnology. The team of scientists observed the surface of graphene sheets and found a series of ridges on the material, which could improve understanding of superconductivity. (The Engineer)
- 5 December
  - NASA's exoplanet-hunting Kepler mission confirms its first extrasolar planet in the habitable zone of a Sun-like star. The planet, Kepler-22b, is around 2.5 times the size of Earth, and may have a surface temperature of 22 degrees Celsius, making it potentially suitable for terrestrial life. (BBC) (NASA)
  - New research suggests that at least three-quarters of the rise in average global temperatures since the 1950s is due to human activity. (The Age) (Nat. Geosci.)
  - American scientists report the discovery of the two largest supermassive black holes known to science. The two black holes each have a mass nearly 10 billion times greater than the Sun. (BBC) (Nature)
  - German researchers have demonstrated a graphene-based transistor array that is compatible with living biological cells and capable of recording the electrical signals they generate. (The Engineer) (Adv. Mater.)
- 6 December – When climate data is adjusted to remove the impact of short-term factors such as El Niño-Southern Oscillation, volcanic aerosols and solar variability, the global warming signal becomes even more evident, according to a new study. (Environ. Res. Lett.)
- 8 December
  - NASA's Opportunity Mars rover finds veins of gypsum on the surface of Mars, strongly implying the presence of liquid water on the planet. (BBC)
  - Spanish researchers unveil a process which allows highly complex shapes to be "carved" into nanoparticles, potentially revolutionising medical tests and drugs treatments. (BBC) (Science)
- 9 December – Biologists at Tufts University coax tissue to grow a new organ by simply altering the membrane voltage gradients of cells. In the experiment, tadpoles were made to grow new eyes outside of their head areas. (Development)
- 13 December
  - Plumes of methane – a greenhouse gas 20 times more potent than carbon dioxide – are observed bubbling to the surface of the Arctic Ocean by scientists surveying the region. (The Independent)
  - Researchers at the Large Hadron Collider report that the elusive Higgs boson may have been glimpsed during particle collisions. (BBC)

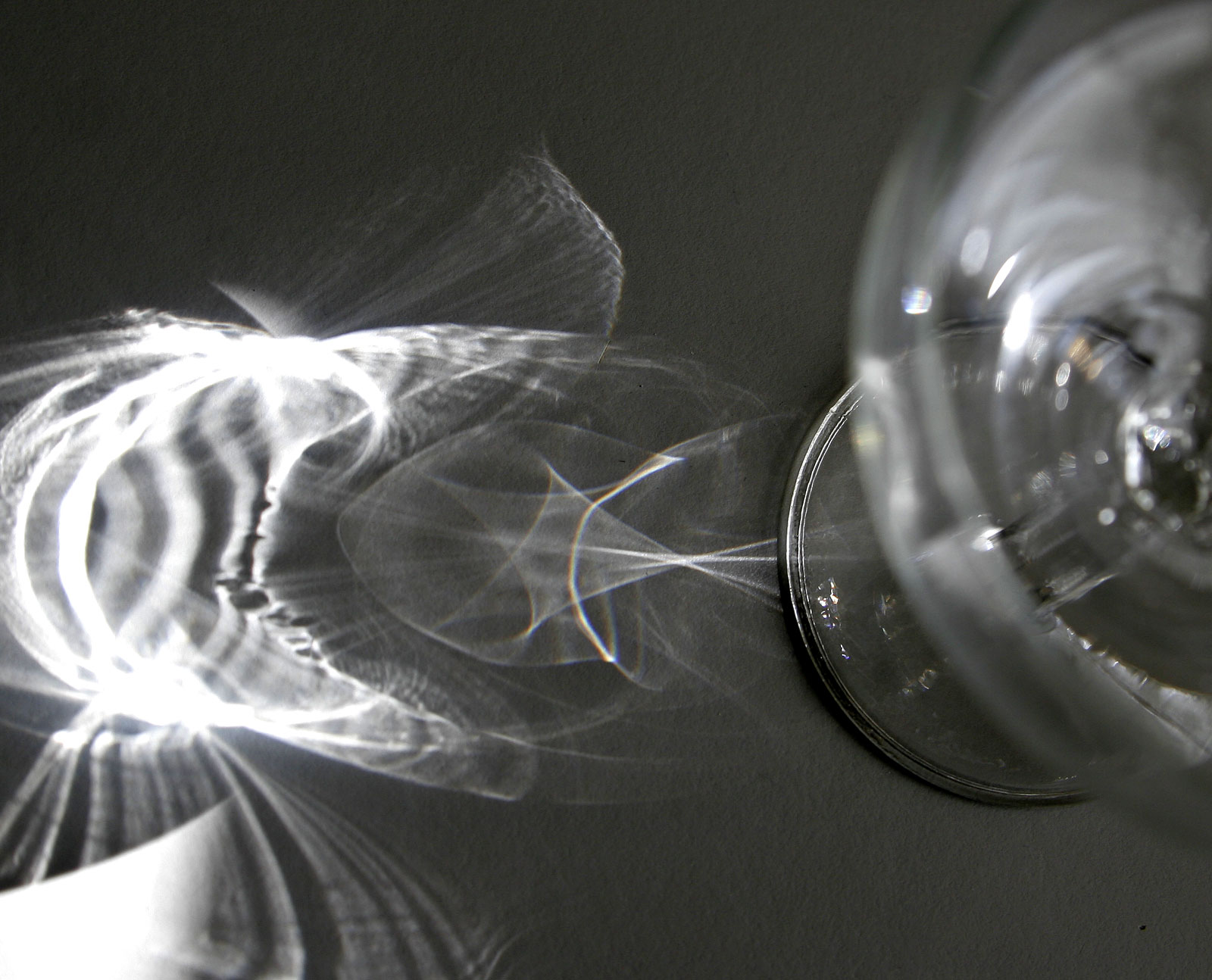
14 December 2011: scientists develop an imaging system which can capture images at one trillion frames per second, allowing it to image the motion of individual light waves.

- 14 December
  - MIT scientists develop an imaging system capable of capturing images at one trillion frames per second – fast enough to image individual light waves travelling through space. (MSNBC)
  - Microsoft co-founder Paul Allen and aerospace engineer Burt Rutan announce plans to develop a commercial spaceflight venture, dubbed Stratolaunch Systems, using a giant carrier aircraft to launch rockets from the upper atmosphere. The first uncrewed test flights of the system are expected to begin in 2016. (Huffington Post)
- 15 December
  - American researchers extend the lifespan of fruit flies by up to 50% by tweaking genes in the flies' intestines. (GizMag) (Cell Metab.)
  - Columbia University researchers publish a survey, began in 2003, revealing that same-sex marriage improves the health of gay men overall. The study recorded a reduction in depression, blood-pressure issues, and stress-related disorders. The reaction of lesbians was not studied. (BBC) (Am. J. Public Health)
- 16 December
  - Chinese engineers demonstrate a chemical coating, based on titanium dioxide, which allows cotton clothes to clean themselves of stains when exposed to sunlight. (ACS Appl. Mater. Interfaces)
  - The Energy Saving Trust (EFT) reports the results of a trial of LED light fittings in social housing in the United Kingdom. The LED fittings offered significant improvements in efficiency over traditional light fittings, and also proved more popular with residents. The EFT predicts a substantial market share for LED lighting by 2015. (BBC) (EST)
  - Brown University engineers reveal a system that can efficiently remove traces of toxic heavy metals from water. The technique is reportedly scalable and commercially viable. (Chem. Eng. J.)
- 17 December – American researchers report advances in solar cell efficiency, using quantum dot technology to capture additional electrons from photons striking solar panels. (CNET) (Science)
- 19 December – Scientists at the University of California report a major breakthrough in the cultivation of drought-tolerant crops. (PNAS)
- 20 December
  - Scientists operating the Kepler Space Telescope report the discovery of the first truly Earth-sized extrasolar planets, Kepler-20e and Kepler-20f, orbiting a Sun-like star, Kepler-20. (NASA) (Nature)
  - A potential new malaria vaccine has shown promise in animal studies, according to Oxford University researchers. The team plans to start safety trials in human volunteers, following lab tests which showed the vaccine to be effective against all known strains of malaria. (BBC) (Nat. Commun.)
  - Canadian scientists win approval to start human trials of an experimental HIV vaccine. (The Star)

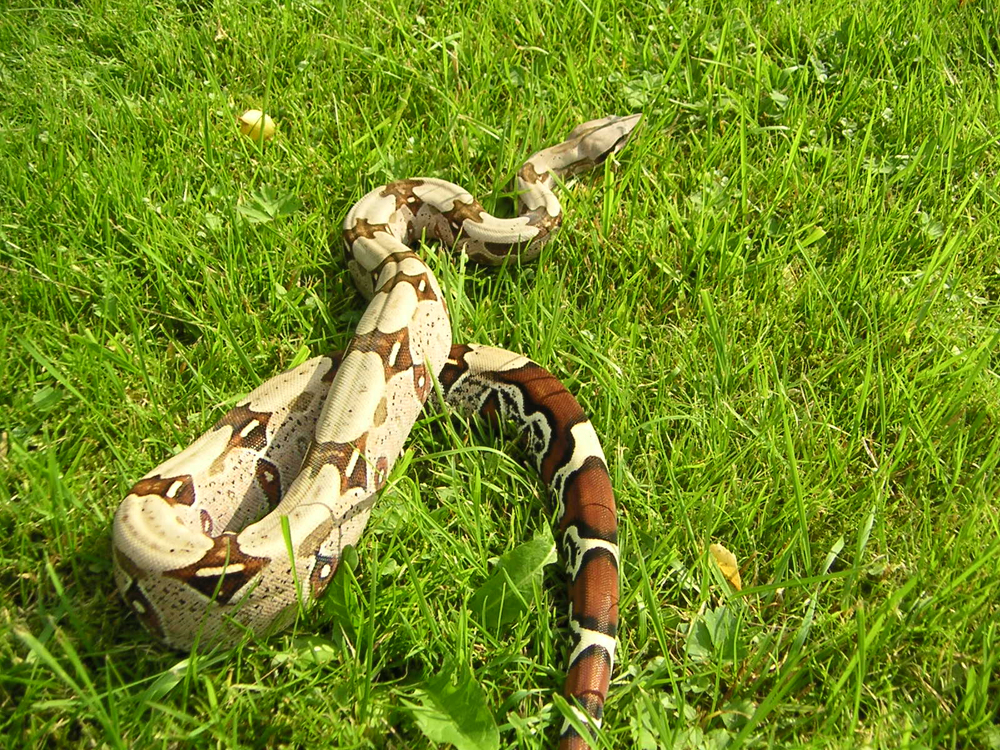
21 December 2011: researchers report that non-native snakes have devastated populations of small mammals in the Florida Everglades.

- 21 December
  - Researchers at the University of Notre Dame reveal an inexpensive "solar paint" that uses semiconducting nanoparticles to capture solar energy. (ACS Nano)
  - According to a study published in PNAS, the introduction of non-native snakes into southern Florida swamps has devastated the population of small mammals in the region, with sightings of species such as raccoons declining by 99% since 2000. (Davidson Herpetology Laboratory) (ACS Nano)
- 22 December
  - China conducts its 18th successful orbital launch of 2011, marking the first year that more Chinese than American spacecraft were launched. (Wired)
  - University of Texas researchers report that solar cells can be made to yield more energy by exploiting a so-called "shadow state" of photons, doubling the number of electrons that may be harvested in the process. The discovery could allow the theoretical maximum efficiency of silicon solar cells to be increased from 31% to 44%. (GizMag) (Science)
  - American researchers unveil self-repairing electronic chips that can repair broken circuits by releasing microcapsules of conductive liquid metal. (BBC) (Adv. Mater.)
  - Harvard University researchers develop a method of supercooling that could generate the lowest temperatures yet achieved on Earth, potentially aiding the creation of quantum computers. (BBC) (Nature)
  - Researchers at CERN's Large Hadron Collider (LHC) report the discovery of a new particle, dubbed Chi_{b}(3P). The discovery marks the LHC's first clear observation of a new particle since it became operational in 2009. (BBC) (arXiv)
- 27 December
  - China activates its Compass satellite navigation system, a rival to the American Global Positioning System (GPS), offering navigation services in mainland China. The system, also known as Beidou-2, is expected to offer global coverage by 2020. (BBC)
  - China unveils a prototype high-speed train capable of reaching speeds of over 310 mph (500 km/h), the first ultra-high-speed train developed by China without the aid of international partnerships. (Financial Times)
- 29 December
  - South Korean researchers begin the development of microscopic robots capable of entering human blood vessels to treat illnesses. The microbots, which measure just 1 millimeter in diameter, are steered and propelled by externally induced magnetic fields. (Innovation News Daily)
  - The wildlife trade monitor group Traffic reports that more ivory was seized in 2011 than in any year since 1989. Around 23 tonnes (51,000 lb) of ivory – representing at least 2,500 dead elephants – were intercepted in 13 operations, mostly in shipments intended for the Asian market. (BBC) (Traffic)
  - Chemists at Harvard University report the creation of a self-assembling artificial cell membrane, formed from an oil/detergent emulsion mixed with copper ions.
- 31 December – NASA's GRAIL-A satellite enters lunar orbit, to be joined the following day by its twin, GRAIL-B. The two spacecraft will map the Moon's gravitational field in unprecedented detail, with the aim of improving scientists' understanding of how the Moon formed. (NASA)

== Prizes ==
=== Abel Prize ===
- 2011 Abel Prize: John Milnor

=== Nobel Prize ===
- 2011 Nobel Prize in Physiology or Medicine: Bruce Beutler, Jules A. Hoffmann and Ralph M. Steinman
- 2011 Nobel Prize in Physics: Saul Perlmutter, Brian Schmidt and Adam Riess
- 2011 Nobel Prize in Chemistry: Dan Shechtman

== Deaths ==
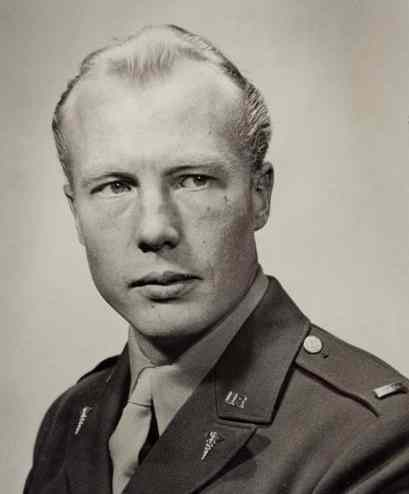
11 February 2011: Christian J. Lambertsen, the inventor of the SCUBA device, dies aged 93.

=== January ===
- 1 January – Louise Reiss, American physician, co-ordinated the Baby Tooth Survey (b. 1920).
- 3 January – Anatoliy Skorokhod, Ukrainian mathematician (b. 1930).
- 4 January – Jack Richardson, British chemical engineer (b. 1920).
- 5 January – Jack Ertle Oliver, American scientist, provided seismic evidence supporting plate tectonics (b. 1923).
- 8 January – Willi Dansgaard, Danish paleoclimatologist and geophysicist (b. 1922).
- 17 January
  - Shinichiro Sakurai, Japanese automotive engineer (b. 1929).
  - Bernard Crossland, British engineer (b. 1923).
- 18 January – John Herivel, British historian of science and former cryptanalyst (b. 1918).
- 9 January – Ernest McCulloch, Canadian haematologist, pioneer of stem cell science (b. 1926).
- 25 January – Daniel Bell, American sociologist (b. 1919).
- 31 January – Charles Kaman, American aeronautical engineer (b. 1919).

=== February ===
- 2 February – Rodney Hill, British mathematician, pioneer of plasticity theory (b. 1921).
- 6 February – Ken Olsen, American engineer, Digital Equipment Corporation founder (b. 1926).
- 8 February – Bradley C. Livezey, American ornithologist (b. 1954).
- 10 February – Oleg Lavrentiev, Soviet physicist (b. 1926).
- 11 February – Christian J. Lambertsen, American physician and engineer, developer of the first SCUBA device (b. 1917).
- 13 February
  - Nobutoshi Kihara, Japanese engineer, lead worker on the Sony Walkman (b. 1926).
  - Shi Yafeng, Chinese geographer and glaciology expert (b. 1919).
- 15 February – Charles Epstein, American geneticist and Unabomber victim (b. 1933).
- 17 February – Richard F. Daines, American physician and health official (b. 1951).
- 19 February – Anson Rainey, American scholar of Near East history and Linguistics (b. 1930).
- 20 February – Frank A. McClintock, American mechanical engineer (b. 1921).
- 21 February – Edwin D. Kilbourne, American research scientist and influenza vaccine expert (b. 1920).
- 26 February – Zhu Guangya, Chinese nuclear physicist, helped develop China's first atomic bomb (b. 1924).

=== March ===
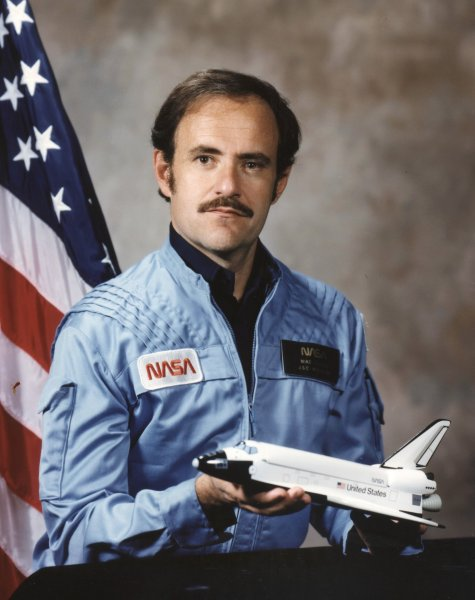
1 March 2011: John M. Lounge, a former NASA astronaut, dies aged 64.

- 1 March – John M. Lounge, American astronaut (b. 1946).
- 3 March
  - Venkatraman Radhakrishnan, Indian astronomer (b. 1929).
  - James L. Elliot, American astronomer, discoverer of the rings of Uranus (b. 1943).
- 4 March
  - Simon van der Meer, Dutch Nobel physicist (b. 1925).
  - Chester Kahapea, American soil scientist, known as the "face of Hawaiian statehood" (b. 1945).
  - Alenush Terian Armenian-Iranian astronomer and physicist (b. 1920).
- 5 March – Alberto Granado, Argentine founder of the Santiago School of Medicine (b. 1922).
- 6 March – Marie-Andrée Bertrand, Canadian criminologist (b. 1925).
- 8 March
  - Victor Manuel Blanco, Puerto Rican astronomer (b. 1918).
  - Iraj Afshar, Iranian scholar and bibliographer (b. 1925).
- 11 March – Donny George Youkhanna, Iraqi archaeologist and anthropologist (b. 1950).
- 13 March – David Rumelhart, American applied psychologist (b. 1942).
- 14 March
  - Leslie Collier, British virologist (b. 1921).
  - G. Alan Marlatt, American addiction medicine pioneer (b. 1941).
- 17 March – Murdoch Mitchison, British biologist (b. 1917).
- 19 March – Robert Ross, American physician and educator, founder of the Ross University School of Medicine and the University of Medicine and Health Sciences (b. 1918).
- 21 March – Bohumil Fišer, Czech cardiologist and health minister (b. 1943).
- 23 March
  - Teodor Negoiţă, Romanian polar explorer and scientist (b. 1947).
  - Jean Bartik, American mathematician and ENIAC programmer (b. 1924).
- 25 March – Thomas Eisner, German-American entomologist and pioneer of chemical ecology (b. 1929).
- 26 March
  - Paul Baran, Polish Internet pioneer (b. 1926).
  - Harry Coover, American superglue inventor (b. 1917).

=== April ===
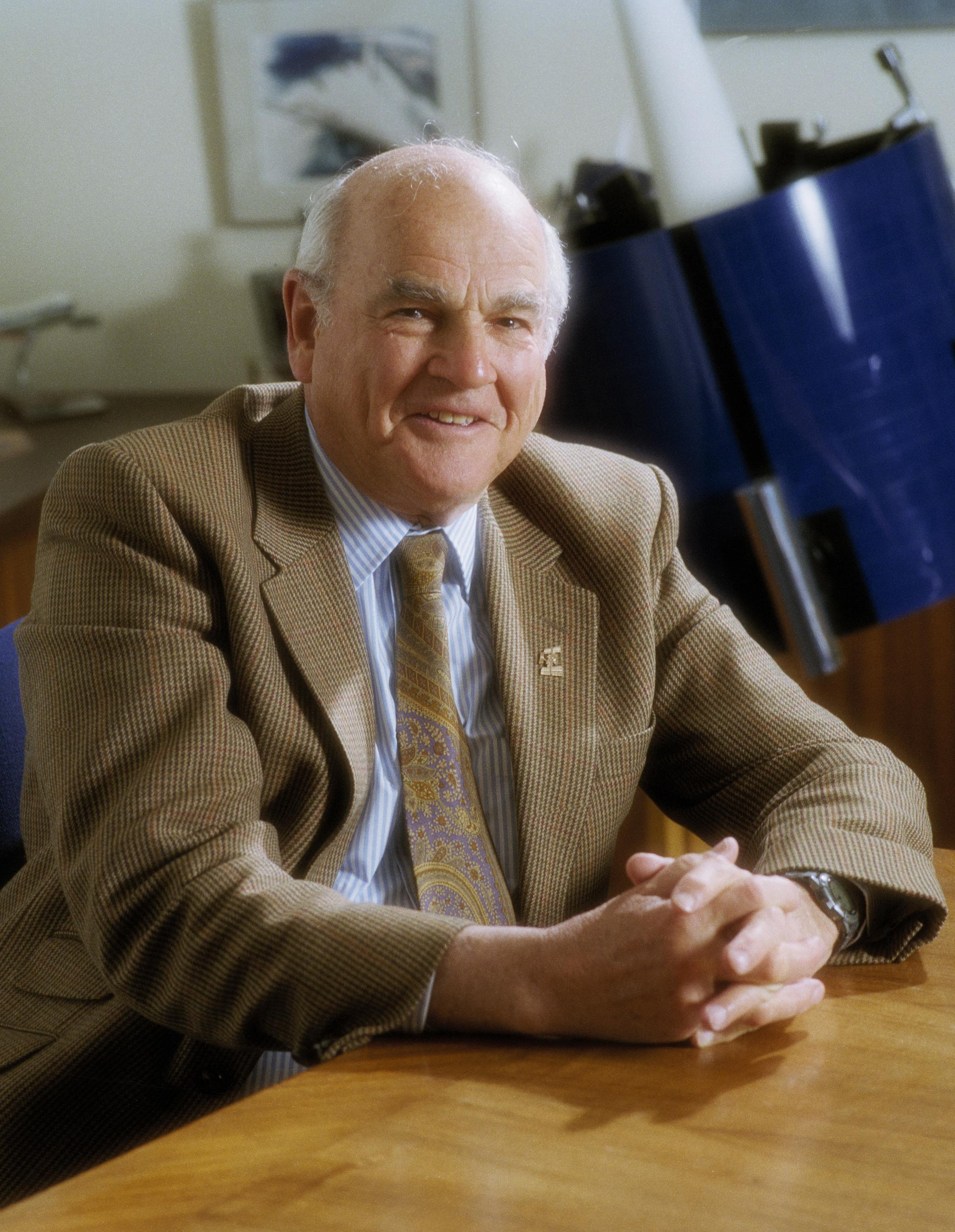
5 April 2011: Baruch Samuel Blumberg, a Nobel Prize-winning American physician, dies aged 85.

- 2 April – John C. Haas, American chemical engineer (b. 1918).
- 3 April – William Prusoff, American pharmacologist and early AIDS drug pioneer (b. 1920).
- 5 April – Baruch Samuel Blumberg, American Nobel physician (b. 1925).
- 6 April – F. Gordon A. Stone, American chemist (b. 1925).
- 9 April – Jerry Lawson (engineer), American video game pioneer (b. 1940).
- 12 April – Jānis Polis, Latvian pharmacologist (b. 1938).
- 14 April – William Lipscomb, American Nobel chemist (b. 1919).
- 21 April
  - Harold Garfinkel, American sociologist and pioneer of ethnomethodology (b. 1917).
  - Max Mathews, American electrical engineer who arranged the synthesized musical accompaniment for "Daisy Bell" (b. 1926).
- 22 April – Merle Greene Robertson, American archaeologist whose drawings were used to crack the Maya script (b. 1913).
- 30 April – Daniel Quillen, American mathematician (b. 1940).

=== May ===
- 1 May
  - Steven A. Orszag, American mathematician (b. 1943).
  - J. Ernest Wilkins, Jr., American nuclear physicist (b. 1923).
- 2 May – David Sencer, American physician and former director of the CDC (b. 1924).
- 3 May – Robert Brout, American-born Belgian physicist (b. 1928).
- 5 May
  - Leslie Audus, British botanist (b. 1911).
  - Salomón Hakim, Colombian physician (b. 1929).
- 6 May – Horace Freeland Judson, American science historian (b. 1931).
- 7 May – Willard Boyle, Canadian Nobel physicist (b. 1924).
- 8 May – Corwin Hansch, American chemist (b. 1918).
- 9 May – Henry Feffer, American surgeon (b. 1918).
- 11 May – Maurice Goldhaber, Austrian-born American physicist (b. 1911).
- 12 May
  - Noreen Murray, British molecular geneticist (b. 1935).
  - Jack Keil Wolf, American electrical engineer (b. 1935).

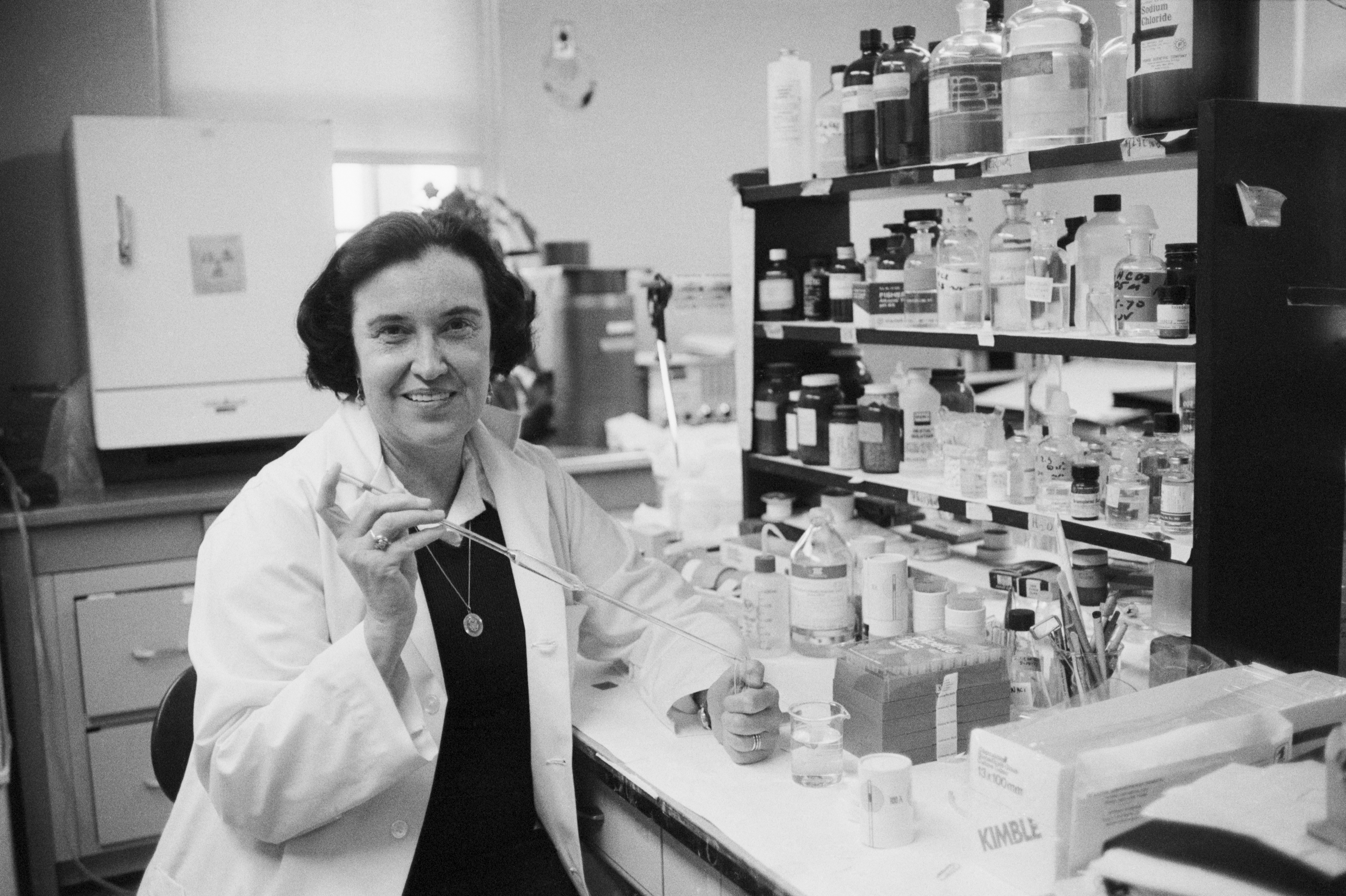
30 May 2011: Rosalyn Sussman Yalow, a Nobel Prize-winning American physicist, dies aged 89.

- 19 May
  - David H. Kelley, American-born Canadian archaeologist (b. 1924).
  - Tom West, American computer engineer (b. 1939).
- 20 May – Steve Rutt, American engineer and early pioneer of video animation (b. 1945).
- 26 May – Irwin D. Mandel, American dentist (b. 1922).
- 28 May
  - Leo Rangell, American psychiatrist (b. 1913).
  - John H. Sinfelt, American chemical engineer in unleaded gasoline (b. 1931).
- 30 May – Rosalyn Sussman Yalow, American physicist and winner of the Nobel Prize in Medicine (b. 1921).

=== June ===
- 3 June – Jack Kevorkian, American pathologist, advocate of euthanasia (b. 1928).
- 8 June – Anatole Abragam, Russian-born French physicist (b. 1914).
- 11 June – James Rahal, American physician, West Nile virus expert (b. 1933).
- 16 June – Östen Mäkitalo, Swedish electrical engineer, cell phone inventor (b. 1938).
- 17 June – Nathan Sharon, Israeli biochemist (b. 1925).
- 18 June – Bob Pease, American electrical engineer (b. 1940).
- 20 June
  - Robert H. Widmer, American aeronautical engineer (b. 1916).
  - He Zehui, Chinese nuclear physicist (b. 1914).
- 23 June – Christiane Desroches Noblecourt, French Egyptologist (b. 1913).
- 26 June – Robert Morris, American cryptographer (b. 1932).

=== July ===
- 7 July – Ricardo Alegría, Puerto Rican anthropologist and archeologist (b. 1921).
- 8 July – William R. Corliss, American physicist (b. 1926).
- 11 July – Tom Gehrels, Dutch-born American astronomer (b. 1925).
- 15 July – John S. Toll, American physicist and university chancellor (b. 1923).
- 16 July – John Crook, British ethologist (b. 1930).
- 18 July – Rudiger D. Haugwitz, German-born American chemist (b. 1932).
- 21 July
  - Franz Alt, Austrian-born American mathematician (b. 1910).
  - Harold J. Kosasky, Canadian-born American physician (b. c. 1928).

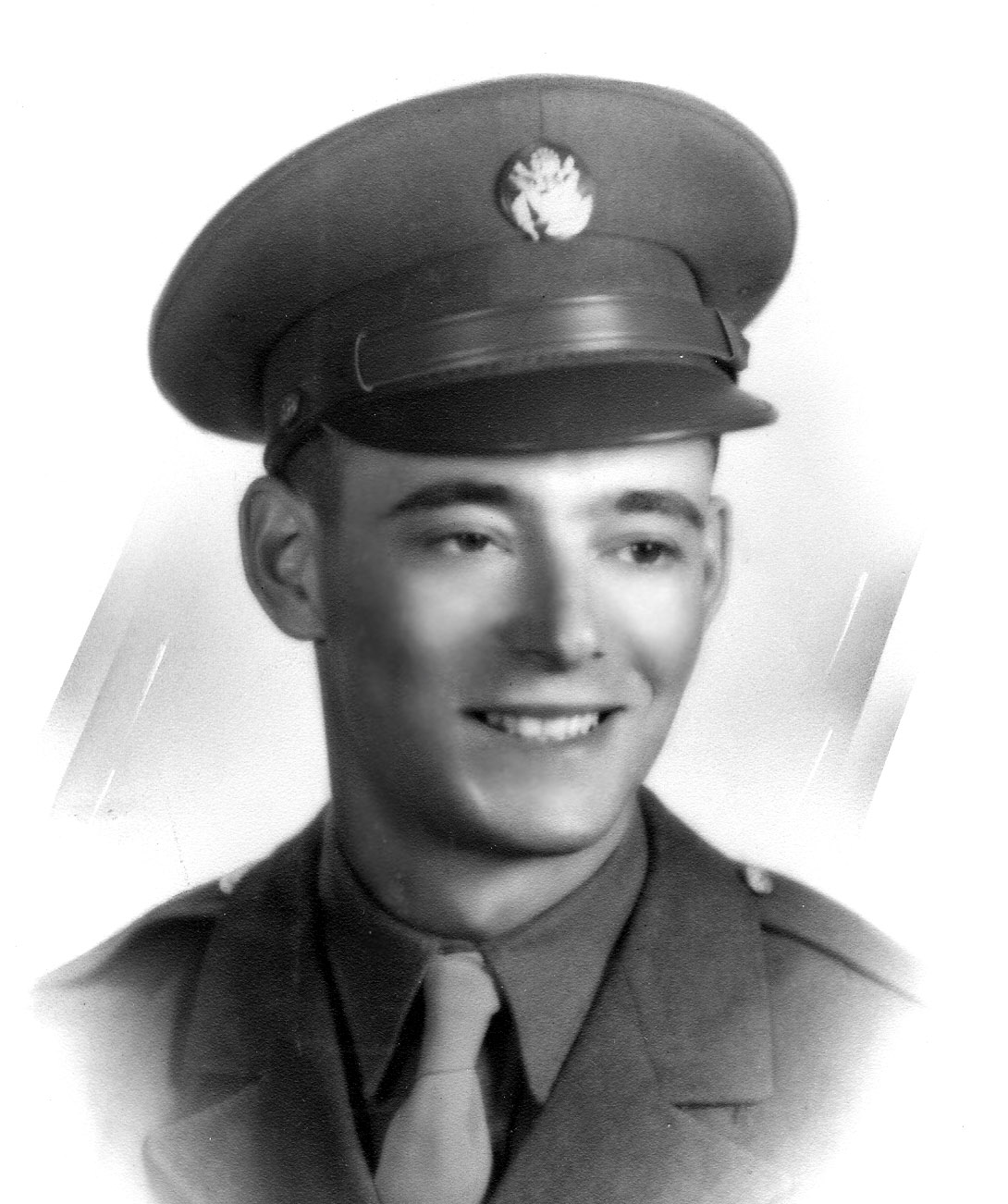
23 July 2011: Robert Ettinger, the "father of cryonics", dies aged 92.

- 23 July
  - Robert Ettinger, American academic, known as "the father of cryonics" and a pioneer of transhumanism (b. 1918).
  - Richard Pike, British chemist (b. 1950).
- 27 July – John Rawlins, British Surgeon Vice-Admiral (b. 1922).
- 28 July – Max Harry Weil, Swiss-born American physician (b. 1927).
- 30 July – Daniel D. McCracken, American computer scientist (b. 1930).

=== August ===
- 2 August – Baruj Benacerraf, Venezuelan-born American Nobel immunologist (b. 1920).
- 6 August – Bernadine Healy, American physician (b. 1944).
- 7 August
  - Charles C. Edwards, American physician (b. 1923).
  - Paul Meier, American mathematician (b. 1924).
- 11 August – George Devol, American inventor of the first industrial robot. (b. 1912).
- 14 August – Fritz H. Bach, Austrian-born American physician (b. 1934).
- 18 August – Maurice M. Rapport, American neuroscience biochemist (b. 1919).
- 20 August
  - William B. Kannel, American physician (b. 1923).
  - William I. Wolff, American physician and colonoscopy co-developer (b. 1916).
- 26 August – Patrick C. Fischer, American computer scientist and Unabomber target (b. 1935).
- 27 August – Keith Tantlinger, American mechanical engineer (b. 1919).
- 28 August – Tony Sale, British computer museum curator (b. 1931).
- 29 August – Pauline Morrow Austin, American meteorologist (b. 1916).

=== September ===
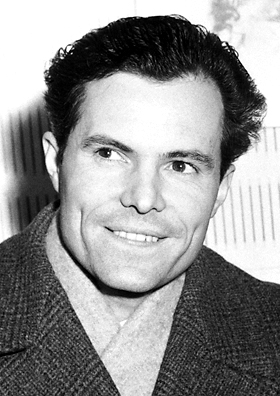
14 September 2011: Rudolf Mössbauer, a Nobel Prize-winning German physicist, dies aged 82.

- 5 September – Angioletta Coradini, Italian astrophysicist (b. 1946).
- 6 September – Bruce B. Dan, American physician (b. 1946).
- 9 September – Valentino Braitenberg, Italian neuroscientist and cyberneticist (b. 1926).
- 14 September – Rudolf Mössbauer, German Nobel physicist (b. 1929).
- 16 September – William Hawthorne, British aeronautical engineer (b. 1913).
- 17 September – Julius Blank, American mechanical engineer (b. 1925).
- 20 September – Oscar Handlin, American historian (b. 1915).
- 21 September – Michael Julian Drake, American astronomer (b. 1946).
- 22 September – Margaret Ogola, Kenyan physician (b. 1958).
- 23 September – Carl Wood, Australian physician (b. 1929).
- 24 September – Richard Koch, American physician, advocate for phenylketonuria neonate screening (b. 1921).
- 25 September – Wangari Maathai, Kenyan veterinary anatomist and Nobel Peace Prize winner (b. 1940).
- 26 September – Robert Blinc, Slovene physicist (b. 1933).
- 27 September – Wilson Greatbatch, American electrical engineer and the inventor of the implantable cardiac pacemaker (b. 1919).
- 28 September – Pierre Dansereau, Canadian biologist (b. 1911).
- 30 September
  - Lee Davenport, American physicist (b. 1915).
  - Ralph M. Steinman, Canadian Nobel immunologist (b. 1943).

=== October ===
- 1 October – J. Willis Hurst, American physician (b. 1920).
- 3 October – Aden Meinel, American astronomer (b. 1922).
- 5 October – Steve Jobs, American computer engineer and technology entrepreneur, co-founder of Apple Inc. (b. 1955).

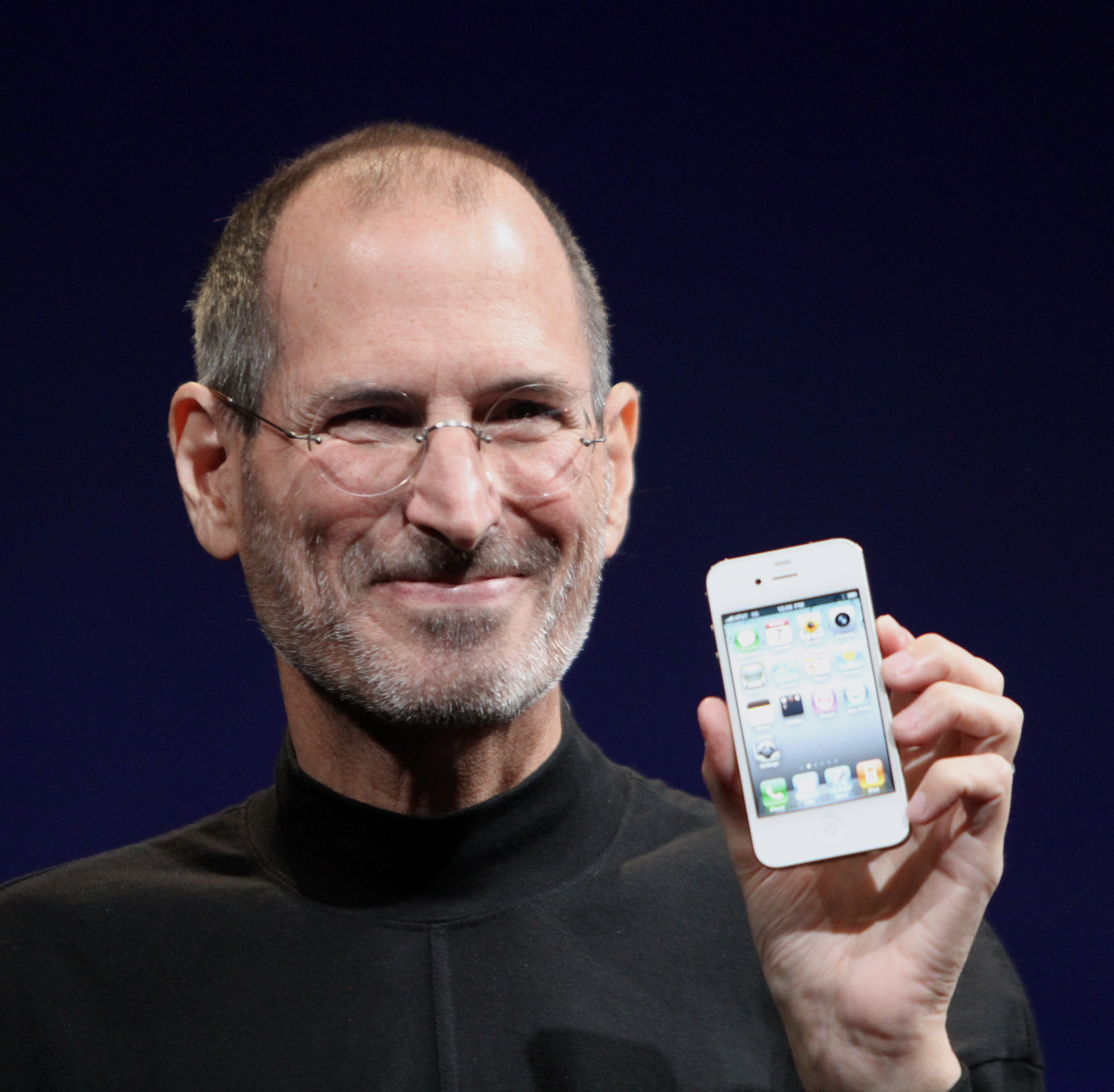
5 October 2011: Steve Jobs, American technology entrepreneur and co-founder of Apple Inc., dies aged 56.

- 8 October – Milan Puskar, American pharmaceutical executive (b. 1934).
- 11 October – Bob Galvin, American electronics executive (b. 1922).
- 12 October – Dennis Ritchie, American computer scientist (b. 1941).
- 14 October – Morris Chafetz, American psychiatrist (b. 1924).
- 21 October – George Daniels, English horologist (b. 1926).
- 23 October – Herbert A. Hauptman, American mathematical biophysicist, winner of the Nobel Prize in Chemistry (b. 1917).
- 24 October – John McCarthy, American computer scientist and cognitive scientist (b. 1927).
- 30 October – David Utz, American surgeon (b. 1923).

=== November ===
- 2 November – John F. Burke, American physician (b. 1922).
- 4 November – Norman Foster Ramsey, Jr., American Nobel physicist, key contributor to the atomic clock (b. 1915).
- 22 November – Lynn Margulis, American evolutionary biologist (b. 1938).
- 25 November – T. Franklin Williams, American physician and specialist in geriatrics (b. 1921).
- 28 November – Lloyd J. Old, American physician (b. 1933).

=== December ===
- 5 December – Paul M. Doty, American biochemist (b. 1920).
- 14 December – Boris Chertok, Russian rocket scientist (b. 1912).

== See also ==
- List of emerging technologies
- List of years in science
- 2011 in spaceflight
