= 1923 in science =

List of years in science	(table)
- … 1913; 1914; 1915; 1916; 1917; 1918; 1919; 1920; 1921; 1922; 1923; 1924; 1925; 1926; 1927; 1928; 1929; 1930; 1931; 1932; 1933 …
- Art; Archaeology; Architecture; Literature; Music; Philosophy; Science; +...

The year 1923 in science and technology involved some significant events, listed below.

== Aeronautics ==
- January 17 (or 9) – First stable flight of the first rotorcraft, Juan de la Cierva's Cierva C.4 autogyro, in Spain.

== Astronomy and space science ==
- June – Hermann Oberth publishes Die Rakete zu den Planetenräumen ("By Rocket into Planetary Space").
- October 21 – First official public showing of a planetarium projector, a Zeiss model at the Deutsches Museum in Munich.

== Biology ==
- March 23 – The governor of Oklahoma signs House Bill 197 with the Montgomery amendment outlawing the theory of evolution in public school textbooks purchased by the state, the first anti-Darwinian legislation passed in the United States.
- Karl von Frisch publishes "Über die 'Sprache' der Bienen. Eine tierpsychologische Untersuchung" ("On the 'language' of bees: an examination of animal psychology").

== Chemistry ==
- Dirk Coster and George de Hevesy publish their discovery of the transition metal element hafnium (_{72}Hf) in zirconium ore, working in Copenhagen (Latin: Hafnia).
- Niels Bohr and Dirk Coster, working in Copenhagen, produce a paper on X-ray spectroscopy and the periodic system of the elements.
- Gilbert N. Lewis and Merle Randall's textbook Thermodynamics and the Free Energy of Chemical Reactions is influential in the replacement of the concept of chemical affinity by free energy.

== Cryptography ==
- Enigma machine first produced commercially.

== Electronics ==
- Otto Julius Zobel of Bell Labs describes the type of signal processing filter sections based on the image impedance design principle which will become known as Zobel networks.
- December 29 – Vladimir K. Zworykin files his first patent (in the United States) for "television systems".

== Exploration ==
- Tanager Expedition.

== Medicine ==
- February – The Maudsley Hospital, established jointly by the London County Council and Henry Maudsley, admits its first psychiatric patients.
- Capgras delusion, a delusional misidentification syndrome, is first described by Joseph Capgras.
- First diphtheria vaccine by Gaston Ramon, Emil von Behring and Kitasato Shibasaburō.

== Paleontology ==
- July 13 – An American Museum of Natural History expedition to Mongolia under Roy Chapman Andrews is the first in the world to discover fossil dinosaur eggs. Initially thought to belong to the ceratopsian Protoceratops, they are determined in 1995 actually to belong to the theropod Oviraptor. On August 11 Peter Kaisen recovers the first Velociraptor fossil known.

== Physics ==
- Arthur Eddington publishes the textbook The Mathematical Theory of Relativity in Cambridge.

== Technology ==
- Herbert Grove Dorsey invents the first practical fathometer.

== Awards ==
- Nobel Prizes
  - Physics: Robert Andrews Millikan
  - Chemistry: Fritz Pregl
  - Medicine: Frederick Banting and John Macleod
- Copley Medal: Horace Lamb
- Wollaston Medal for Geology: William Whitaker

== Births ==
- January 1 – Daniel Gorenstein (died 1992), American mathematician.
- January 11 – Robert J. Gorlin (died 2006), American pathologist.
- February 13 – Chuck Yeager (died 2020), American pilot.
- February 14 – Doris Calloway, née Howes (died 2001), American nutritionist.
- February 20 – Helen Murray Free (died 2021), American medical chemist.
- March 4 – Patrick Moore (died 2012), English astronomer.
- March 9 – Walter Kohn (died 2016), Viennese-born physicist.
- March 10 – Val Logsdon Fitch (died 2015), American nuclear physicist, recipient of the Nobel Prize in Physics.
- April 1 – Brigitte Askonas (died 2013), Viennese-born British immunologist.
- April 2 – G. Spencer-Brown (died 2016), English mathematician.
- April 16 – Stewart Adams (died 2019), English pharmaceutical chemist.
- April 21 – Albert (Ab) C. Perdeck (died 2009), Dutch ornithologist.
- April 23 – Walter Pitts (died 1969), American logician and cognitive psychologist.
- July 5 – Ivo Pitanguy (died 2016), Brazilian plastic surgeon.
- July 12 – René Favaloro (died 2000), Argentine cardiac surgeon.
- July 23 – Ulf Grenander (died 2016), Swedish-born mathematician.
- July 28 – Xia Peisu (died 2014), Chinese computer scientist.
- July 31 – Stephanie Kwolek (died 2014), American polymer chemist.
- August 19 – Edgar F. Codd (died 2003), English-born computer scientist.
- September 9 – Daniel Carleton Gajdusek (died 2008), American virologist.
- September 13 – Miroslav Holub (died 1998), Czech immunologist and poet.
- September 26 – John Ertle Oliver (died 2011), American geophysicist.
- October 29 – Carl Djerassi (died 2015), Viennese-born chemist.
- November 8 – Jack Kilby (died 2005), American electrical engineer, recipient of the Nobel Prize in Physics.
- November 18 – Alan Shepard (died 1998), American astronaut.
- December 13 – Philip Warren Anderson (died 2020), American physicist, recipient of the Nobel Prize in Physics.
- December 15 – Freeman Dyson (died 2020), English-born theoretical physicist.

== Deaths ==
- February 10 – Wilhelm Röntgen (born 1845), German physicist, discoverer of X-rays, Nobel laureate.
- February 24 – Edward Morley (born 1838), American chemist.
- March 8 – Johannes Diderik van der Waals (born 1837), Dutch physicist.
- March 27 – James Dewar (born 1842), Scottish-born chemist.
- April 11 – Mary Treat (born 1830), American naturalist.
- July 16 – Sydney Mary Thompson (born 1847), Irish-born geologist and botanist.
- August 23 – Hertha Ayrton (born 1854), English electrical engineer.
- October 3 – Kadambini Ganguly (born 1861), Indian physician.
- December 2 – Henry Haversham Godwin-Austen (born 1834), English surveyor, geologist and naturalist.
- December 7 – Sir Frederick Treves (born 1853), English-born surgeon.
- December 27 – Gustave Eiffel (born 1832), French structural engineer.
