= 1918 in science =

The following events in science and technology occurred in the year 1918.

== Astronomy ==
- June 8 – Nova Aquila, the brightest observed since 1604, is discovered.
- Kiyotsugu Hirayama identifies several groups of main belt asteroids, now known as Hirayama families.
- Harlow Shapley demonstrates that globular clusters are arranged in a spheroid or halo whose center is not the Earth, but the center of the galaxy.
- Heber Curtis discovers a relativistic jet of matter emerging from Elliptical galaxy M87.

== Biology ==
- February 21 – The last known Carolina parakeet (the only parrot species native to the eastern United States) dies in Cincinnati Zoo.
- Around 1000 pilot whales strand in the Chatham Islands.
- R. A. Fisher puts forward a genetic model that shows that continuous variation could be the result of Mendelian inheritance in his paper "The Correlation Between Relatives on the Supposition of Mendelian Inheritance".
- J. Henri Fabre's The Sacred Beetle, and others published in English.
- Jacques Loeb's Forced Movements, Tropisms, and Animal Conduct published in the United States.

== Cryptography ==
- February 23 – Arthur Scherbius applies to patent the Enigma machine.
- Edward Hugh Hebern patents the Hebern rotor machine.

== History of science ==
- Technisches Museum Wien opens in Vienna.

== Mathematics ==
- Felix Hausdorff introduces the concept of the fractional Hausdorff dimension.
- Gaston Julia describes the iteration of a rational function.

== Physics ==
- July 26 – Emmy Noether introduces what becomes known as Noether's theorem, from which conservation laws are deduced for symmetries of angular momentum, linear momentum and energy, at Göttingen, Germany.
- Josef Lense and Hans Thirring find the gravitomagnetic precession of gyroscopes in the equations of general relativity.
- Hans Reissner and Gunnar Nordström solve the Einstein and Maxwell field equations for charged spherically symmetric non-rotating systems.
- Friedrich Kottler gets a Schwarzschild solution without Einstein vacuum field equations.

== Physiology and medicine ==
- January – 1918 flu pandemic: "Spanish 'flu" (influenza) first observed in Haskell County, Kansas.
- March 26 – Dr. Marie Stopes publishes her influential book Married Love in the U.K., following it with Wise Parenthood, a treatise on birth control.
- June–August – "Spanish 'flu" becomes pandemic.
- September 7 – J. B. Christopherson publishes his discovery that antimony potassium tartrate is an effective cure for bilharzia.
- Hartog Jacob Hamburger describes the chloride shift.

== Technology ==
- April 10 – Alexander M. Nicolson files a United States patent for the radio crystal oscillator.
- July – American cinematographer Frank D. Williams is granted a patent for the "Williams process" of travelling matte.
- Edwin Howard Armstrong develops the superheterodyne receiver.
- George Constantinescu publishes Theory of sonics: a treatise on transmission of power by vibrations, originating the study of this branch of continuum mechanics.
- Theodore von Karman and Asbóth Oszkár build the first co-axial helicopter.
- Charles Strite invents the pop-up toaster.

== Awards ==
- Nobel Prize
  - Physics – Max Karl Ernst Ludwig Planck
  - Chemistry – Fritz Haber
  - Medicine – not awarded

== Births ==
- January 23 – Gertrude B. Elion (died 1999), American pharmacologist, Nobel laureate.
- January 27 – Antonín Mrkos (died 1996), Czech astronomer.
- March 13 – Marjorie Blamey (died 2019), English botanical illustrator.
- March 16 – Frederick Reines (died 1998), American physicist, Nobel laureate.
- April 4 – Joseph Ashbrook (died 1980), American astronomer.
- April 25 – Gérard de Vaucouleurs (died 1995), French astronomer.
- May 11 – Richard Feynman (died 1988), American physicist, Nobel laureate.
- May 20 – Alexandra Illmer Forsythe (died 1980), American computer scientist
- June 6 – Edwin G. Krebs (died 2009), American biochemist, Nobel laureate.
- July 15
  - Bertram Brockhouse (died 2003), Canadian physicist.
  - Brenda Milner, English-born neuropsychologist.
- July 16 – Samuel Victor Perry (died 2009), English biochemist, pioneer in the field of muscle biochemistry.
- August 3 – Cheng Kaijia (died 2018), Chinese nuclear physicist.
- August 13 – Frederick Sanger (died 2013), English molecular biologist, double Nobel laureate.
- August 26 – Katherine Johnson (died 2020), African American mathematician and space physicist.
- August 29 – John Herivel (died 2011), British cryptanalyst and science historian.
- September 8 – Derek Barton (died 1998), English-born organic chemist, Nobel laureate.
- September 27 – Martin Ryle (died 1984), English radio astronomer.
- October 4 – Adrian Kantrowitz (died 2008), American cardiac surgeon.
- November 10 – Ernst Otto Fischer (died 2007), German chemist, Nobel laureate.
- November 19 – Hendrik C. van de Hulst (died 2000), Dutch astronomer.
- December 25 – Tamara Mikhaylovna Smirnova (died 2001), Russian astronomer.
- Eleanor C. Pressly (died 2003), American mathematician and aeronautical engineer.

== Deaths ==
- January 6 – Georg Cantor (born 1845), German mathematician.
- January 26 – Ewald Hering (born 1834), German physiologist.
- January 31 – Ivan Puluj (born 1845), Austrian-born Ukrainian physicist.
- April 20 – Karl Ferdinand Braun (born 1850), German physicist, Nobel laureate.
- May 1 – G. K. Gilbert (born 1843), American geologist.
- May 31 – Alexander Mitscherlich (born 1836), German chemist.
- June 13 – Samuel Jean de Pozzi (born 1846), French gynaecologist.
- June 27 – George Mary Searle (born 1839), American astronomer.
- June 29 – Alfred Senier (born 1853), Irish chemist.
- September 7 – Peter Ludwig Mejdell Sylow (born 1832), Norwegian mathematician.
- August 22 – Korbinian Brodmann (born 1868), German neurologist.
- October 28 – Ulisse Dini (born 1845), Italian mathematician.
- November 3 – Aleksandr Lyapunov (born 1857), Russian mathematician and physicist.
- November 29 – Thomas Allinson (born 1858), English physician and dietetic reformer.
- December 26 – William Hampton Patton (born 1853), American entomologist.
- December 27 – Birt Acres (born 1854), American-born English pioneer of cinematography.
