= 1904 in science =

List of years in science	(table)
- … 1894; 1895; 1896; 1897; 1898; 1899; 1900; 1901; 1902; 1903; 1904; 1905; 1906; 1907; 1908; 1909; 1910; 1911; 1912; 1913; 1914 …
- Art; Archaeology; Architecture; Literature; Music; Philosophy; Science; +...

The year 1904 in science and technology involved some significant events, listed below.

== Astronomy ==
- Johannes Franz Hartmann discovers the interstellar medium.
- Edward Walter Maunder plots the first sunspot "butterfly diagram".
- Notable asteroid 522 Helga is discovered by Max Wolf in Heidelberg.
- December 3 – The sixth moon of Jupiter, later called Himalia, is discovered at Lick Observatory.

== Cartography ==
- Van der Grinten projection proposed.

== Mathematics ==
- Henri Poincaré discovers the Poincaré homology sphere, leading him to formulate the Poincaré conjecture.
- Helge von Koch describes the "Koch snowflake", one of the earliest fractal curves described.
- Charles Spearman develops his rank correlation coefficient.
- Ernst Zermelo formulates the axiom of choice to formalize his proof of the well-ordering theorem.

== Medicine ==
- September 17 – An early study on the relationship between alcohol and cardiovascular disease is published in the United States.
- Epinephrine first artificially synthesized by Friedrich Stolz.
- Antoni Leśniowski presents to a meeting of the Warsaw Medical Society a surgical specimen of an inflammatory tumour of the terminal ileum with a fistula to the ascending colon, consistent with what will later become known as Crohn's disease.

== Physics ==
- Vacuum tube invented by John Ambrose Fleming.
- James H. Jeans's The Dynamical Theory of Gases is published in Cambridge.
- J. J. Thomson proposes the plum pudding model for the atom.
- Hantaro Nagaoka develops the Saturnian model for the atom.

== Technology ==
- July 4 – Piero Ginori Conti demonstrates the use of geothermal power to generate electricity, at Larderello in Italy.
- July 23 – A continuous track tractor is patented by David Roberts of Richard Hornsby & Sons of Grantham in England.
- November 16 – John Ambrose Fleming patents the first thermionic vacuum tube, the two-electrode diode ("oscillation valve" or Fleming valve).
- November 24 – A continuous track tractor is demonstrated by the Holt Manufacturing Company in the United States.
- The first diesel engined submarine, the Z, is built in France.
- The Heckelphone variety of oboe is invented by Wilhelm Heckel and his sons.
- The sleeve valve is invented by Charles Yale Knight.
- The turbine-powered Bliss-Leavitt torpedo, designed by Frank McDowell Leavitt and manufactured by the E. W. Bliss Company of Brooklyn, is put into service by the United States Navy.
- Lucien Bull produces the first successful chronophotography (of insect flight), working in France.
- Rue Franklin Apartments, Paris, are completed by Auguste Perret and his brother Gustave, an early example of an exposed reinforced concrete frame building.

== Zoology ==
- First identification and last confirmed sighting of the Choiseul pigeon in the Solomon Islands.

== Awards ==
- Nobel Prizes
  - Physics – John William Strutt, 3rd Baron Rayleigh
  - Chemistry – Sir William Ramsay
  - Medicine – Ivan Pavlov

== Births ==
- January 21 – Edris Rice-Wray Carson (died 1990), American-born physician, pioneer in family planning.
- January 26 – Ancel Keys (died 2004), American nutritionist.
- March 13 – René Dumont (died 2001), French agronomist.
- March 20 – B. F. Skinner (died 1990), American behavioral psychologist.
- April 11 – Arthur Mourant (died 1994), Jersiais hematologist.
- April 22 – J. Robert Oppenheimer (died 1967), American physicist.
- June 3 – Charles R. Drew (died 1950), African American physician, pioneer in blood transfusion.
- July 5 – Ernst Mayr (died 2005), German-born evolutionary biologist.
- August 5 – Kenneth V. Thimann (died 1997), English-American plant physiologist and microbiologist known for his studies of plant hormones.
- August 17 – Cornelis Simon Meijer (died 1974), Dutch mathematician.
- August 28 – Secondo Campini (died 1980), Italian jet pioneer.
- August 29 – Werner Forssmann (died 1979), German physician, recipient of the Nobel Prize in Physiology or Medicine.
- November 11 – J. H. C. Whitehead (died 1960), British mathematician.
- Sven Sømme (died 1961), Norwegian ichthyologist and resistance worker.

== Deaths ==
- March 7 – Ferdinand André Fouqué (born 1828), French geologist, petrologist and volcanologist.
- May 10 – Henry Morton Stanley (born 1841), Welsh-born explorer and journalist.
- July 3 – John Bell Hatcher (born 1861), American paleontologist.
- September 24 – Niels Ryberg Finsen (born 1860), Icelandic/Faroese/Danish physician and scientist, recipient of the Nobel Prize in Physiology or Medicine.
- October 7 – Isabella Bird (born 1831), British explorer, writer, photographer and naturalist.
- October 21 – Isabelle Eberhardt (born 1877), Swiss–Algerian explorer.
