= 1853 in science =

The year 1853 in science and technology involved some significant events, listed below.

== Biology ==
- March 17 – Claude Bernard presents his doctoral thesis describing the glycogenetic function of the liver.
- May – The world's first public aquarium is opened in London Zoo.
- Anton de Bary publishes the first study demonstrating that rust and smut fungi cause plant disease.

== Exploration ==
- November 25 – First definite sighting of Heard Island in the Antarctic.
- Alfred Russel Wallace publishes A Narrative of Travels on the Amazon and Rio Negro, with an account of the native tribes, and observations on the climate, geology, and natural history of the Amazon Valley.

== Mathematics ==
- Jakob Steiner investigates the Steiner system.

== Medicine ==
- August 1 – Under terms of the Vaccination Act 1853 in the United Kingdom, all children born after this date are to receive compulsory vaccination against smallpox during their first 3 months of life.
- William Little publishes a paper "On the Deformities of the Human Frame" in which he gives the first description of pseudo-hypertrophic muscular dystrophy.
- Charles Pravaz and Alexander Wood independently invent a practical hypodermic syringe.
- Antoine Desormeaux produces and names an endoscope illuminated by a kerosene lamp, using it to examine the urinary tract.

== Meteorology ==
- August 23 – The first true International Meteorological Organization is established in Brussels (Belgium).
- John Francis Campbell invents the original form of Campbell–Stokes recorder (for sunshine).

== Technology ==
- Eugenio Barsanti and Felice Matteucci first develop the Barsanti-Matteucci engine, an internal combustion engine using the free-piston principle.
- Sir George Cayley builds and demonstrates the first heavier-than-air aircraft (a glider).

== Awards ==
- Copley Medal: Heinrich Wilhelm Dove
- Wollaston Medal for Geology: Adolphe d'Archiac; Édouard de Verneuil

== Births ==
- January 24 – Alfred Senier (died 1918), British chemist.
- February 15 – Frederick Treves (died 1923), English surgeon.
- March 2 – Ambrosius Hubrecht (died 1915), Dutch zoologist.
- March 10 – William Hampton Patton (died 1918), American entomologist.
- April 8 – Laura Alberta Linton (died 1915), American chemist.
- July 18 – Hendrik Lorentz (died 1928), Dutch physicist and Nobel laureate.
- September 2 – Wilhelm Ostwald (died 1932), Baltic German chemist.
- September 9 – Pierre Marie (died 1940), French neurologist.

== Deaths ==
- March 17 – Christian Doppler (born 1803), Austrian mathematician and discoverer of the Doppler effect.
- March 20 – Robert James Graves (born 1796), Irish physician
- April 23 – Auguste Laurent (born 1807), French chemist.
- July 8 – Ernst Friedrich Germar (born 1786), German entomologist.
- September 14 – Hugh Edwin Strickland (born 1811), English geologist and ornithologist.
- October 2 – François Arago (born 1786), French mathematician, physicist, and astronomer.
- October 18 – Gotthelf Fischer von Waldheim (born 1771), German naturalist.
