= 2007 in science =

3 March 2007: A total lunar eclipse occurs (time lapse shown).

The year 2007 involved many significant scientific events and discoveries, some of which are listed below.

== Astronomy ==
- 12 January – Comet McNaught reaches perihelion and becomes visible from Earth during daylight.
- 28 February – The New Horizons space probe makes a gravitational slingshot around Jupiter to change its trajectory towards Pluto.
- 3–4 March – A total lunar eclipse occurs, visible in some parts of the Americas and Asia, and in all of Europe and Africa.
- 19 March – A partial solar eclipse occurs, visible in Asia.
- 10 April – Spectroscopic analysis of HD 209458 b, an extrasolar planet, provides the first evidence of atmospheric water vapor beyond the Solar System.
- 24 April – The potentially habitable exoplanet Gliese 581 c is discovered in the constellation Libra.
- May – High Resolution Fly's Eye Observatory (HiRes) and Pierre Auger Observatory present their results suggesting a confirmation for the Greisen–Zatsepin–Kuzmin limit, the theoretical limit for ultra-high-energy cosmic rays interacting with the Cosmic Microwave Background.
- 5 June – NASA's MESSENGER spacecraft makes its second flyby of Venus en route to Mercury, which it reaches in 2011.
- 2 July – Venus and Saturn are in conjunction, with a separation of 46 arcseconds.
- 28 August – A total lunar eclipse occurs, visible in some parts of the Americas and Asia, and all of Australasia and the Pacific Ocean.
- 11 September – A partial solar eclipse occurs, visible in southern areas of South America.
- 27 September – NASA's Dawn spacecraft is launched, beginning its journey to the asteroid belt objects Vesta and Ceres. It reached Vesta in 2011, and Ceres in 2015.
- 24 October
  - Comet 17P/Holmes suddenly brightens from 17 to 2.8 magnitude.
  - Chang'e 1, the first satellite in the Chinese Lunar Exploration Program, is launched from Xichang Satellite Launch Center; on 5 November it enters lunar orbit.

== Biology ==
- 14 January – Scientists at the Roslin Institute announce they have genetically engineered chickens to lay eggs containing cancer-fighting proteins.
- 7 February – The second "Berlin Patient", Timothy Ray Brown, is given a stem cell transplant from a donor carrying the CCR5-Δ32 allele, which cures his HIV/AIDS.

== Computer Science ==
- 9 January – Apple Inc.'s first iPhone smartphone is announced by Steve Jobs at Macworld in San Francisco; it is released in the United States on 29 June.
- 27 April – US researchers simulate half a virtual mouse brain on a supercomputer.
- 23 August – Chris Messina proposes use of the hashtag on Twitter.
- 5 November – The Open Handset Alliance launches the Android mobile operating system.

== Prizes ==
=== Abel Prize ===
- 2007 Abel Prize: S. R. Srinivasa Varadhan

=== Nobel Prize ===
- 2007 Nobel Prize in Physiology or Medicine: Mario Capecchi, Oliver Smithies and Martin Evans
- 2007 Nobel Prize in Physics: Albert Fert and Peter Grünberg
- 2007 Nobel Prize in Chemistry: Gerhard Ertl

== Deaths ==
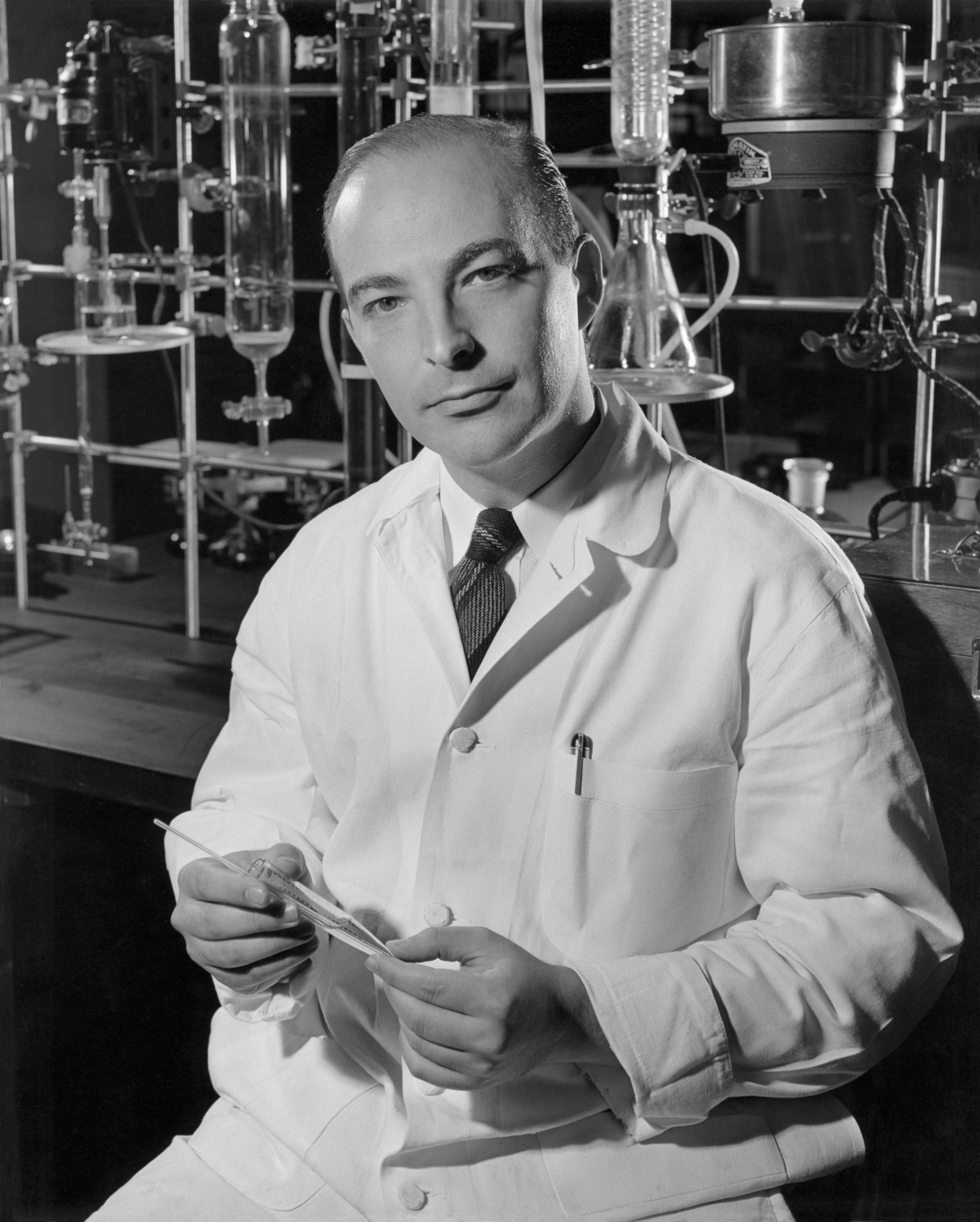
26 October 2007: Arthur Kornberg, Nobel Prize-winning American biochemist, dies aged 89.

- 20 February – F. Albert Cotton (b. 1930), American chemist known for research on transition metal chemistry
- 22 February – Lucille Farrier Stickel (b. 1915), American wildlife toxicologist
- 23 March – Paul Cohen (b. 1934), American mathematician, winner of the 1966 Fields Medal
- 27 March – Paul Lauterbur (b. 1929), American chemist, winner of the 2003 Nobel Prize in Physiology or Medicine for his work in developing magnetic resonance imaging
- 4 April – Karen Spärck Jones (b. 1935), English computer scientist
- 7 July – Dame Anne McLaren (b. 1927), English developmental biologist and her ex-husband Donald Michie (b. 1923), British AI researcher (automobile accident
- 23 July – Ernst Otto Fischer (b. 1918), German winner of the 1973 Nobel Prize in Chemistry for pioneering work in the area of organometallic chemistry
- 12 August – Ralph Asher Alpher (b. 1921), American cosmologist
- 29 September – Katsuko Saruhashi (b. 1920), Japanese geochemist
- 26 October – Arthur Kornberg (b. 1918), American biochemist, winner of the 1959 Nobel Prize in Physiology or Medicine for his discovery of the mechanisms in the biological synthesis of DNA

== See also ==
- 2007 in spaceflight
- List of emerging technologies
