= 1915 in science =

The year 1915 involved numerous significant events in science and technology, some of which are listed below.

== Astronomy ==
- January – British physicist Sir Joseph Larmor publishes his observations on "The Influence of Local Atmospheric Cooling on Astronomical Refraction".
- March 19 – Pluto is photographed for the first time but is not classified as a planet.
- Einstein's new theory of general relativity is used to explain Mercury's strange motions that baffled Urbain Le Verrier.
- Robert Innes discovers Proxima Centauri, the closest star to Earth after the Sun.

== Chemistry ==
- Alice Ball discovers how to make Chaulmoogra tree oil water-soluble, which makes it usable for patients with leprosy in Hawai'i.
- Thomas Lyle Williams produces the mascara Maybelline.

== Earth sciences ==
- May 22 – Lassen Peak, one of the Cascade Volcanoes in Northern California, erupts, sending an ash plume 30,000 feet in the air and devastating the nearby area with pyroclastic flows and lahars. It is the only volcano to erupt in the contiguous United States between 1900 and 1980.
- Alfred Wegener publishes his theory of Pangea, which he calls Urkontinent.

== Paleontology ==
- The new theropod dinosaur genus and species Spinosaurus aegyptiacus is assigned by German paleontologist Ernst Stromer.

== Life sciences ==
- January – Mildred Hoge publishes her discovery of the gene (much later identified as PAX6) responsible for development of the eye.
- A global pandemic of encephalitis lethargica begins.
- Trench nephritis is first reported as affecting soldiers of the British Expeditionary Force in Flanders in the British Medical Journal; the name is coined by Nathan Raw.
- Walter Bradford Cannon coins the term fight or flight to describe an animal's response to threats.
- Thomas Hunt Morgan, demonstrates non-inherited genetic mutation (in Drosophila melanogaster), undermining the conceptual basis of eugenics.
- Reginald Punnett's Mimicry in Butterflies is published in Cambridge (U.K.)
- Clara H. Hasse publishes a paper identifying the cause of citrus canker which leads to the development of methods for controlling the disease, saving the citrus crops in the southern United States from being wiped out.

== Mathematics ==
- Emmy Noether proves her theorem that any differentiable symmetry of the action of a physical system has a corresponding conservation law.
- Wacław Sierpiński describes the Sierpinski triangle.

== Physics ==
- August – Ada Hitchins' experimental results indicating that radium is formed by the decay of uranium are published.
- November 25 – Albert Einstein presents to the Prussian Academy of Sciences the Einstein field equations of general relativity. He abandons his hole argument for general relativity.
- Arnold Sommerfeld develops a modified Bohr atomic model with elliptic orbits to explain relativistic fine structure.

== Psychology ==
- Danish psychologist Edgar Rubin publishes Synsoplevede Figurer ("Visual Figures") introducing the optical illusion which becomes known as the Rubin vase.

== Technology ==
- January 19 – Georges Claude patents the neon discharge tube for use in advertising.
- February 4 – John G. A. Kitchen patents the reversing rudder.
- March 3 – The National Advisory Committee for Aeronautics, the predecessor of NASA, is established in the United States.
- July 1 – First use of synchronization gear in aerial warfare.
- August – Brodie helmet patented in the United Kingdom.
- September 9 – William Foster & Co. of Lincoln, England, complete the first prototype military tank "Little Willie".
- Max Fleischer invents the rotoscoping film animation process in the United States.
- Wolfgang Gaede invents the diffusion pump.
- William Mills patents, develops and manufactures the Mills bomb, a hand grenade, at the Mills Munition Factory in Birmingham, England.
- Dagobert Müller von Thomamühl produces a form of hovercraft.

== Awards ==
- Nobel Prize
  - Physics – Sir William Henry Bragg and Sir William Lawrence Bragg
  - Chemistry – Richard Martin Willstätter

== Births ==
- January 11 – Lucille Farrier Stickel (died 2007), American wildlife toxicologist.
- February 26 – Wang Daheng (died 2011), Chinese optical physicist.
- February 28 – Peter Medawar (died 1987), Brazilian-born British biologist, co-recipient of the Nobel Prize in Physiology or Medicine (1960) for his work in immunology.
- March 15 – Laurent Schwartz (died 2002), French mathematician.
- March 16 – Kunihiko Kodaira (died 1997), Japanese mathematician.
- May 30 – Henry Aaron Hill (died 1979), American fluorocarbon chemist and first African American president of the American Chemical Society.
- June 15
  - Thomas Huckle Weller (died 2008), American virologist and co-recipient of the Nobel Prize in Physiology or Medicine (1954) for his work on polio.
  - Xu Ruiyun (suicide 1969), Chinese mathematician.
- June 24 – Fred Hoyle (died 2001), English astronomer and science fiction writer.
- July 19 – Katherine Sanford (died 2005), American cell biologist.
- July 20 – Matest M. Agrest (died 2005), Russian mathematician and ethnologist
- July 28 – Charles Hard Townes (died 2015), American physicist and co-recipient of the Nobel Prize in Physics (1964) for developing the maser.
- October 1 – Jerome Bruner (died 2016), American developmental and educational psychologist.
- October 12 – H. Basil S. Cooke (died 2018), South African-born Canadian geologist and palaeontologist
- October 26 – Lu Jiaxi (died 2001), Chinese physical chemist.
- November 18 – Tang Aoqing (died 2008), Chinese quantum chemist.
- November 30 – Henry Taube (died 2005), Canadian-born recipient of the Nobel Prize in Chemistry (1983).
- December 5 – Ren Xinmin (died 2017), Chinese rocket scientist.
- December 22 – A. E. Wilder-Smith (died 1995), English-born organic chemist.

== Deaths ==
- February 17 – Stanislaus von Prowazek (born 1875), Bohemian-born parasitologist.
- April 19 – Sir Thomas Clouston (born 1840), Scottish psychiatrist.
- March 21 – Ambrosius Hubrecht (born 1853), Dutch zoologist.
- March 24 – Margaret Lindsay Huggins (born 1848), Irish-born astronomer.
- May 2 – Clara Immerwahr (born 1870), German chemist (suicide).
- May 7 – Marie Depage (born 1872), Belgian nurse (died in sinking of the RMS Lusitania).
- May 13 – Morgan Crofton (born 1826), Irish-born mathematician.
- July 22 – Sir Sandford Fleming (born 1827), Canadian engineer and surveyor known as the "father of time zones".
- August 10 – Henry Moseley (born 1887), English physicist (killed in action on the Gallipoli Campaign).
- September 26 – Tsuruko Haraguchi (born 1886), Japanese psychologist (tuberculosis).
- October 11 – Jean Henri Fabre (born 1823), French entomologist.
- October 15 – Theodor Boveri (born 1862), German geneticist.
- December 19 – Alois Alzheimer (born 1864), German neuroscientist.
