= 2005 in science =

The year 2005 in science and technology involved some significant events.

== Astronomy ==
- January 5 – Eris, the most massive known dwarf planet in the Solar System, is identified by a team the Palomar Observatory in California from images taken on October 21, 2003 (discovery announced July 29, 2005).
- February 23 – Astronomers announce the discovery of a galaxy, VIRGOHI21, that consists almost entirely of dark matter.
- March 23 – Two independent teams report the observation of light from planets circling two different stars, using the Spitzer infrared space telescope. Both groups detect a during conjunction, when the planet is moving behind its sun's disk (occultation).
- March 31 – Dwarf planet Makemake is discovered in the Kuiper belt (discovery announced July 29).
- April 8 – Total solar eclipse.
- May 18 – A second photograph by the Hubble Space Telescope confirms the discovery of two new moons of Pluto: Nix and Hydra.
- July 20–27 – Controversy over the discovery of Haumea: Discovery of dwarf planet Haumea is announced.
- October 3 – Annular solar eclipse.
- October–November – Japanese robotic spacecraft Hayabusa makes a rendezvous with near-Earth asteroid 25143 Itokawa.

== Biology ==
- June 2 – Michael Kosfeld and colleagues publish their findings that oxytocin increases trust in humans.
- August 31 – A first draft of the chimpanzee genome is published.
- October 5 – The Spanish flu virus is reconstructed and shown to be closely related to the Avian influenza virus.
- November 27 – French oral and maxillofacial surgeon Dr. Bernard Devauchelle and colleagues perform the world's first partial face transplant on a living human, replacing Isabelle Dinoire's face, which had been mutilated by her dog.
- The Stitchbird is reintroduced to mainland New Zealand.
- Pamela C. Rasmussen and John C. Anderton publish Birds of South Asia. The Ripley Guide.

== Climatology ==
- January 27 – Scientists behind the climateprediction.net project, a distributed computing project run from Oxford University, announce that first results indicate a long term surface temperature increase due to global warming of between 2 and 11 degrees Celsius as a consequence of doubling carbon dioxide levels, with most of the simulations predicting a temperature rise of around 3.4 °C.

== Computer science ==
- April 23 – The first video is uploaded to the online video hosting service YouTube established by Jawed Karim, Steve Chen and Chad Hurley.

== Paleontology ==
- January 13 – Chinese paleontologists announce the discovery of fossils of Repenomamus robustus and Repenomamus giganticus, mammals that lived 130 million years ago. The fossil discoveries indicate that these mammals preyed on small dinosaurs.
- February 17 – Two Ethiopian fossil skulls originally found in 1967 by Richard Leakey, Omo I and Omo II, are re-dated at 195,000 years old, making them the oldest Homo sapiens remains known.
- December 15 – European and Canadian researchers announce the dating of flint artefacts from Pakefield, Suffolk, UK to around 700,000 years ago, representing the earliest unequivocal evidence for human presence north of the Alps.

== Physics ==
- This has been named the World Year of Physics in honor of the 100th anniversary of Albert Einstein's Annus Mirabilis papers of 1905 and the resulting developments in the field of physics. Many institutions are celebrating by holding lecture series on Einstein, the history of special relativity and quantum mechanics and other public events surrounding the history of physics.

== Space exploration ==
- January 14 – The Huygens probe is successfully sent into the atmosphere of Titan and returns science data to Earth via the Cassini orbiter. It survives the landing on the surface of Titan and sends pictures and other data for more than an hour afterwards.
- January 26 – ESA's SMART-1 begins sending back close range pictures of the lunar surface
- February 7 – NASA announce budget plans – in the announcement, they state that a mission to service the Hubble Space Telescope will not take place, and that a robotic mission to deorbit the telescope with a safe descent into an ocean will take place. The Jupiter Icy Moons Orbiter (Jimo) mission is also cancelled.
- February 12 – ESA successfully launch an Ariane 5 ECA carrying three satellites. The previous attempt to launch the new design of rocket, in December 2002, failed when the rocket deviated from its course minutes into the flight.
- July 4 – The Deep Impact spacecraft successfully observes the disintegration of its "impactor" section colliding with the comet Tempel 1. A large number of other telescopes also provide data on this event.

== Technology ==
- August 29 – Levee failures in Greater New Orleans following Hurricane Katrina.

== Awards ==
- Nobel Prize
  - Nobel Prize in Physiology or Medicine: Barry J. Marshall and Robin Warren
  - Nobel Prize in Physics: Roy J. Glauber, John L. Hall and Theodor W. Hänsch
  - Nobel Prize in Chemistry: Yves Chauvin, Robert H. Grubbs and Richard R. Schrock
- Abel Prize in Mathematics: Peter David Lax

== Appointments ==
- January 26 – The NIH announce that Elizabeth Nabel will succeed Claude Lenfant as director of the US National Heart, Lung, and Blood Institute.
- February 7 – The National Academy of Sciences elects Ralph Cicerone as its next president, to begin his 6-year term on July 1. He takes over from Bruce Alberts.
- February 25
  - – Robert Kirby-Harris is appointed as Chief Executive of the UK's Institute of Physics.
  - – Keith Mason is appointed as the new head of the Particle Physics and Astronomy Research Council in the UK.
  - – Daniel Höchli is appointed director of the Swiss National Science Foundation.
- April 13 – Michael D. Griffin is confirmed by the U.S. Senate as the next NASA administrator, succeeding Sean O'Keefe.
- December 6 – Kaname Ikeda is appointed as first Director General of the International Thermonuclear Experimental Reactor.

== Other events ==
- February 8 – Yale University wins more than $1 million in damages and attorney's fees, along with the patent rights relating to electrospray ionization from former professor and Nobel Prize winner John Fenn.

== Publications ==
- Jorge E. Hirsch publishes his proposal for an h-index to quantify a scientist's publication productivity.

== Deaths ==
- February 3 – Ernst Mayr (b. 1904), German-American evolutionary biologist.
- February 6 – Hubert Curien (b. 1924), French physicist, President of CERN and first chairman of ESA.
- February 10 – D. Allan Bromley (b. 1926), Canadian-American director of Yale's A. W. Wright Nuclear Structure Laboratory.
- March 6 – Hans Bethe (b. 1906), German-American Nobel laureate in Physics (1967) for his discoveries concerning the energy production mechanism in stars.
- March 31 – Stanley J. Korsmeyer (b. 1950), American cell biologist.
- April 11 – Maurice Hilleman (b. 1919), American vaccinologist.
- May 12 – Kai Setälä (b. 1913), Finnish physician.
- June 20
  - Charles David Keeling (b. 1928), American climate scientist, first to make frequent measurements of atmospheric carbon dioxide (CO2) concentration, plotted on the Keeling Curve.
  - Jack Kilby (b. 1923), American electronics engineer, Nobel laureate in Physics (2000) for his work on integrated circuits.
- July 16 – John Ostrom (b. 1928), American paleontologist, pioneer of the "dinosaur renaissance".
- August 21 – Robert Moog (b. 1934), pioneer of electronic music.
- August 31 – Sir Joseph Rotblat (b. 1908), Polish-born British nuclear physicist, Nobel laureate in Peace.
- September 1 – Jacob A. Marinsky (b. 1918), American chemist, co-discoverer of the element Promethium.
- September 20 – Matest M. Agrest (b. 2005), Russian mathematician and ethnologist.
- September 28 – Leo Sternbach (b. 1908), Polish-born American chemist.
- October 28 – Richard Smalley (b. 1943), American Nobel laureate in Chemistry (1996) for the discovery of a new form of carbon, Buckminsterfullerene.
- November 16 – Henry Taube (b. 1915), Canadian-American Nobel laureate in Chemistry (1983) for his work in the mechanisms of electron transfer reactions, especially in metal complexes.
