= 1832 in science =

The year 1832 in science and technology involved some significant events, listed below.

== Biology ==
- Dr. Thomas Bell begins publication of A Monograph of the Testudinata, the first comprehensive study of the world's turtles.
- Isidore Geoffroy Saint-Hilaire begins publication of Histoire générale et particulière des anomalies de l'organisation chez l'homme et les animaux, a key text on teratology.

== Chemistry ==
- Pierre Jean Robiquet isolates the analgesic codeine.
- Friedrich Wöhler and Justus von Liebig discover and explain functional groups and radicals in relation to organic chemistry.
- The synthetic dyestuff pittacal is discovered by German chemist Carl Ludwig Reichenbach.

== Exploration ==
- April 21 – Cyrille Pierre Théodore Laplace completes a four-year global circumnavigation.

== Mathematics ==
- Évariste Galois presents a general condition for the solvability of algebraic equations, thereby essentially founding group theory and Galois theory. On May 29, the eve of a duel from which he will die, he writes his "mathematical testament", a letter to Auguste Chevalier.
- Peter Gustav Lejeune Dirichlet proves Fermat's Last Theorem for n = 14.
- János Bolyai's system of non-Euclidean geometry is first published.

== Medicine ==
- February 12 – In England, a second cholera pandemic begins to spread, starting from the East End of London. It is declared officially over in early May but deaths continue. It will claim at least 3000 victims. In Liverpool, Kitty Wilkinson becomes the "Saint of the Slums" by promoting hygiene.
- July 19 – Anatomy Act in the United Kingdom provides for licensing and inspection of anatomists, and for unclaimed bodies from public institutions to be available for their dissection.
- Dr James Kay publishes The moral and physical condition of the working-class employed in the cotton manufacture in Manchester.
- Thomas Hodgkin first describes abnormalities in the lymph system later known as Hodgkin's lymphoma.

== Oceanography ==
- James Rennell's An Investigation of the Currents of the Atlantic Ocean, and of those which prevail between the Indian Ocean and the Atlantic is published posthumously by his daughter. It will not be significantly superseded for more than a century.

== Physics ==
- Michael Faraday states his laws of electrolysis.
- c. December – Following a paper by Faraday, Belgian physicist Joseph Plateau and Austrian professor of practical geometry Simon Stampfer simultaneously and independently devise the phenakistiscope, an animation device creating an optical illusion of motion.

== Psychology ==
- Swiss crystallographer Louis Albert Necker first publishes the optical illusion which becomes known as the Necker cube.

== Technology ==
- The first commutator DC electric motor, capable of turning machinery, is demonstrated by William Sturgeon in London.
- The first drum-type rotary printing press is completed by anarchist Josiah Warren in New York.

== Awards ==
- Copley Medal: Michael Faraday; Siméon Poisson

== Births ==
- June 17 – William Crookes (died 1919), English chemist and physicist.
- August 16 – Wilhelm Wundt (died 1920), German physiologist and psychologist.
- September 26 – Zsófia Torma (died 1899), Hungarian archaeologist, anthropologist and paleontologist.
- October 4 – Thorborg Rappe (died 1902), Swedish pioneer in the education of students with Intellectual disability.
- December 12 – Ludwig Sylow (died 1918), Norwegian mathematician.
- December 15 – Gustave Eiffel (died 1923), French structural engineer.

== Deaths ==
- May 13 – Georges Cuvier (born 1769), French zoologist.
- May 31 – Évariste Galois (born 1811), French mathematician.
- August 24 – Nicolas Léonard Sadi Carnot (born 1796), French mathematician
- September 2 – Franz Xaver, Baron Von Zach (born 1754), Hungarian astronomer.
- October 31 – Antonio Scarpa (born 1752), Italian anatomist.
- November 8 – Marie-Jeanne de Lalande (born 1768), French astronomer.
