= 1933 in science =

The year 1933 in science and technology involved some significant events, listed below.

== Astronomy ==
- April – American radio engineer Karl Jansky of Bell Labs announces his discovery of a source of radio waves at the centre of Sagittarius (constellation), opening the field of radio astronomy.
- October 13 – The British Interplanetary Society is founded.
- Walter Baade and Fritz Zwicky invent the concept of the neutron star, a new type of celestial object, suggesting that supernovae might be created by the collapse of a normal star to form a neutron star.
- Sir Arthur Eddington publishes The Expanding Universe: Astronomy's 'Great Debate', 1900–1931 in Cambridge.
- Comedian Will Hay observes the periodic Great White Spot on Saturn from his private observatory in London.
- Fritz Zwicky postulates the existence of dark matter.

== Chemistry ==
- Gilbert N. Lewis isolates the first sample of pure heavy water by electrolysis.
- Morris S. Kharasch and Frank R. Mayo propose that free radicals are responsible for anti-Markovnikov addition of hydrogen bromide to allyl bromide.

== Earth sciences ==
- March 10 – Long Beach earthquake in Southern California: First recording of earthquake strong ground motions by an accelerograph network, installed in 1932 by the United States Coast and Geodetic Survey.

== Mathematics ==
- Andrey Kolmogorov publishes Foundations of the Theory of Probability, laying the modern axiomatic foundations of probability theory.
- David Champernowne, while still a Cambridge undergraduate, publishes his work on the Champernowne constant in real numbers.
- Alfréd Haar introduces Haar measure.
- Jerzy Neyman and Egon Pearson publish the Neyman–Pearson lemma.
- Stanley Skewes discovers Skewes' number.

== Pharmacology ==
- Late – Amphetamine is first presented as a pharmaceutical product when Smith, Kline and French in the United States begin selling it as an inhaler under the brand name Benzedrine as a decongestant.

== Physics ==
- September 12 – Leó Szilárd, waiting for a red light on Southampton Row in Bloomsbury (London), conceives the idea of the nuclear chain reaction.
- November 28 – Robert J. Van de Graaff conducts the first public demonstration of the Round Hill generator

== Physiology and medicine ==
- April 3 – First attempted human kidney transplant, by Dr Yuri Voronoy in the Soviet city of Kherson; the recipient dies 2 days later due to incompatibility of blood type with the (cadaveric) donor.
- July 8 – English researchers Wilson Smith, Christopher Andrewes and Patrick Laidlaw report isolating a human influenza A virus and its transferability to ferrets.
- July 14 – Law for the Prevention of Hereditarily Diseased Offspring enacted in Nazi Germany allowing compulsory sterilization of citizens suffering from a list of alleged genetic disorders.
- Manfred Sakel begins to practice insulin shock therapy on psychiatric patients in Vienna.

== Technology ==
- March 7 – The hydraulic torque converter is patented by Alf Lysholm.
- June – A research group at RCA headed by Vladimir K. Zworykin publicly launches the iconoscope, the first practical cathode-ray tube television camera.
- June 26 – American Totalisator unveils its first tote board, the electronic pari-mutuel betting machine, at the Arlington Park race track near Chicago.

== Organizations ==
- Museum of Science and Industry (Chicago) first opens to the public, as part of the Century of Progress Exposition.
- The Institute for Advanced Study opens at Princeton, New Jersey, attracting Albert Einstein, John von Neumann and Kurt Gödel.
- Sheffield Trades Historical Society (later South Yorkshire Industrial History Society) established in England.

== Awards ==
- Nobel Prizes
  - Physics – Erwin Schrödinger and Paul Dirac
  - Chemistry – not awarded
  - Physiology or Medicine – Thomas Hunt Morgan

== Births ==
- January 6 – Oleg Makarov (died 2003), Soviet cosmonaut.
- January 18 – David Bellamy (died 2019), English botanist.
- March 9 – Sir David Weatherall (died 2018), English molecular geneticist.
- March 10 – Patricia Bergquist (died 2009), New Zealand scientist specializing in anatomy and taxonomy.
- March 23 – Philip Zimbardo, American social psychologist.
- April 1 – Claude Cohen-Tannoudji, French physicist and Nobel laureate
- April 14 – Yuri Oganessian, Russian nuclear physicist.
- April 26 – Arno Allan Penzias (died 2024), German-born American physicist and radio astronomer.
- May 22 – Chen Jingrun (died 1996), Chinese mathematician.
- July 9 – Oliver Sacks (died 2015), English-born neurologist.
- July 12 – Max Birnstiel (died 2014), Swiss molecular biologist.
- July 15 – John Hopfield, American neuroscientist, recipient of the Nobel Prize in Physics.
- August 10 – Ed Posner (died 1993), American mathematician.
- August 15
  - Stanley Milgram (died 1984), American social psychologist.
  - Michael Rutter (died 2021) English child psychiatrist.
- September 6 – Juliet Clutton-Brock (died 2015), English zooarchaeologist.
- September 10 – Yevgeny Khrunov (died 2000), Soviet cosmonaut.
- September 26 – Charles C. Conley (died 1984), American mathematician specializing in dynamical systems.
- October 2 – Sir John Gurdon (died 2025), English developmental biologist, recipient of the Nobel Prize in Physiology or Medicine.
- October 9 – Sir Peter Mansfield (died 2017), English physicist, recipient of the Nobel Prize in Physiology or Medicine.
- November 1 – Dijen K. Ray-Chaudhuri, Bengali-born mathematician.
- November 4 – Sir Charles K. Kao (died 2018), Chinese electrical engineer and physicist, recipient of the Nobel Prize in Physics.
- November 14 – Akira Endo (died 2024), Japanese biochemist.
- December 22 – Thomas Stockham (died 2004), American electrical engineer and inventor
- December 23 – Akihito, ichthyologist and Emperor of Japan.

== Deaths ==
- January 14 – Sir Robert Jones, 1st Baronet (born 1857), Welsh orthopaedic surgeon.
- May 22 – Sándor Ferenczi (born 1873), Hungarian psychoanalyst.
- June 14 – Ernest William Moir (born 1862), British civil engineer.
- September 25 – Paul Ehrenfest (born 1880), Austrian physicist and mathematician.
- October 29
  - Albert Calmette (born 1863), French physician, bacteriologist and immunologist.
  - Paul Painlevé (born 1863), mathematician and statesman, 62nd Prime Minister of France.
- November 3 – Pierre Paul Émile Roux (born 1853), French physician, bacteriologist and immunologist.
- December 8 – John Joly (born 1857), Irish physicist.
