= 1921 in science =

The year 1921 in science and technology involved some significant events, listed below.

== Astronomy and space science ==
- Commencement of Gas Dynamics Laboratory the first Soviet research and development laboratory to focus on rocket technology.

== Biology ==
- July 8 – Danish biologist Johannes Schmidt submits for publication his discovery of eel life history.

== Cartography ==
- Winkel tripel projection proposed.

== Chemistry ==
- Étienne Biéler and James Chadwick publish a key paper on the strong interaction.
- December 9 – Thomas Midgley discovers the effective anti-knocking properties of tetraethyllead, which is used in "leaded" gasoline (petrol).

== Exploration ==
- Danish explorer Lauge Koch first sets foot on and names Kaffeklubben Island, the northernmost point of land on Earth.

== Mathematics ==
- John Maynard Keynes publishes A Treatise on Probability.
- Marston Morse applies the Thue–Morse sequence to differential geometry.
- Emmy Noether publishes Idealtheorie in Ringbereichen, developing ideal ring theory, an important text in the field of abstract algebra.
- First publication of Ludwig Wittgenstein's Tractatus Logico-Philosophicus, as "Logisch-Philosophische Abhandlung" in Annalen der Naturphilosophie.
- Percy Alexander MacMahon depicts Cairo pentagonal tiling.

== Medicine ==
- April–August – Nicolae Paulescu publishes papers on the preparation and therapeutic effects in animal subjects of an aqueous pancreatic extract.
- July 18 – The first BCG vaccination against tuberculosis.
- July 27 – Researchers at the University of Toronto led by biochemist Frederick Banting announce the discovery of the hormone insulin.
- American biochemist Elmer McCollum identifies the presence of a component in cod liver oil which cures rickets, which he calls vitamin D.
- Fidel Pagés pioneers epidural anesthesia.

== Physics ==
- July – Wolfgang Pauli is awarded his Doctor of Philosophy at LMU Munich for his thesis Über das Modell des Wasserstoff-Molekülions ("About the Hydrogen Molecular Ion Model").
- T. Kaluza demonstrates that a five-dimensional version of Albert Einstein's equations unifies gravitation and electromagnetism.

== Psychology ==
- Hermann Rorschach publishes Psychodiagnostik, proposing the inkblot test.
- Gaëtan Gatian de Clérambault publishes Les Psychoses passionelles, a comprehensive review of erotomania.

== Technology ==
- Spring and summer – 14-year-old American farm boy Philo Farnsworth devises the image dissector, the basis for the first version of television.
- October 18 – Charles Strite is granted a patent for the automatic electric pop-up bread toaster.
- October 25 – Hugo A. F. Abt is granted a patent for his design of bascule bridge.
- Henrik Brun devises the thermal string vest in Norway.
- The vibraphone in its original form is invented in the United States.

== Institutions ==
- Journalist E. W. Scripps and biologist William Emerson Ritter found Science Service, later renamed Society for Science and the Public, in the United States with the goal of keeping the public informed of scientific developments.

== Awards ==
- Nobel Prize
  - Physics – Albert Einstein – awarded 1922
  - Chemistry – Frederick Soddy
  - Physiology or Medicine – not awarded

== Births ==
- January 18 – Yoichiro Nambu (died 2015), Japanese-American nuclear physicist, recipient of the Nobel Prize in Physics.
- February 3 – Ralph Asher Alpher (died 2007), American cosmologist.
- March 11 – Léopold Reichling (died 2009), Luxembourg biologist and naturalist.
- April 19 – Michel Klein (died 2024), Romanian-born French veterinarian.
- April 21 – John R. Huizenga (died 2014), American nuclear physicist.
- April 30
  - Roger L. Easton (died 2014), American physicist, principal inventor of the Global Positioning System.
  - Ralph A. Lewin (died 2008), Anglo-American biologist, "the father of green algae genetics".
  - Jennifer Moyle (died 2016), English research biochemist.
- May 18
  - Anthony Epstein (died 2024), British pathologist.
  - Olgierd Zienkiewicz (died 2009), British civil engineer.
- June 1 – Giuliana Tesoro (died 2002), Italian-American organic chemist.
- June 9 – Forrest Bird (died 2015), American biomedical engineer.
- June 14 – George Rédei (died 2008), Hungarian biologist.
- June 15 – Gavriil Ilizarov (died 1992), Polish-born orthopedic surgeon.
- June 26 – Anne Beloff-Chain (died 1991), British biochemist.
- July 4 – Aron Arthur Moscona (died 2009), American developmental biologist.
- July 18
  - Aaron T. Beck (died 2021), American psychiatrist, "father of cognitive therapy".
  - John Glenn (died 2016), American astronaut.
- August 16 – Rudolf Trümpy (died 2009), Swiss geologist.
- October 5 – Mahlon Hoagland (died 2009), American biochemist, discoverer of transfer RNA (tRNA).
- October 18 – Beatrice Helen Worsley (died 1972), Mexican-born Canadian computer scientist.
- October 21 – Victor A. McKusick (died 2008), American "father of genetic medicine".
- December 2 – Isabella Karle (died 2017), American physical chemist

== Deaths ==
- January 20 – Mary Watson Whitney, American astronomer (born 1847)
- January 23 – Heinrich Wilhelm Gottfried von Waldeyer-Hartz (born 1836), German neuroanatomist.
- March 11 – Sherburne Wesley Burnham (born 1838), American astronomer.
- March 29 – John Burroughs (born 1837), American naturalist.
- June 7 – Hans Christian Cornelius Mortensen (born 1856), Danish ornithologist.
- August 29 – Joel Asaph Allen (born 1838), American zoologist.
- October 23 – John Boyd Dunlop (born 1840), British inventor.
- December 12 – Henrietta Swan Leavitt (born 1868), American astronomer.
