= 1996 in science =

The year 1996 in science and technology involved many significant events, listed below.

== Astronomy and space exploration ==
The cloning process that produced Dolly.

- January 30 – Comet Hyakutake is discovered.
- February 17 – NEAR Shoemaker spacecraft launched. The craft landed on asteroid 433 Eros in 2001.
- May – First naked-eye observation of Comet Hale-Bopp.
- June 4 – The European Space Agency's Cluster is lost when the maiden flight of the Ariane 5 rocket fails, self-destructing 37 seconds after launch from the Guiana Space Centre because of a software bug in the computer control system.
- October 3 – Reinhard Genzel and Andrea Ghez demonstrate the existence of a supermassive compact object at the centre of our galaxy, later identified as a black hole.
- November 7 – NASA launches the Mars Global Surveyor.
- The second 9.8 m reflecting telescope opens at Keck Observatory, Mauna Kea, Hawaii.

== Biology ==
- July 5 – Dolly the sheep, the first mammal to be successfully cloned from an adult cell, is born at The Roslin Institute in Scotland.
- August 6 – NASA announces that the Allan Hills 84001 meteorite thought to originate from Mars, may contain evidence of primitive life-forms; further tests are inconclusive.
- The yeast Saccharomyces cerevisiae's genome is sequenced, the first eukaryotic genome to be fully sequenced.

== Chemistry ==
- February 9 – Copernicium first created at the Gesellschaft für Schwerionenforschung in Darmstadt, Germany, by Sigurd Hofmann, Victor Ninov and others.

== Computer science ==
- January
  - The Google web search engine originates as "BackRub", a research project using PageRank by Larry Page and Sergey Brin, PhD students at Stanford University, California.
  - First USB specification issued.
- January 23 – The first version of the Java programming language is released.
- February 10 – Deep Blue defeats chess grand-master Garry Kasparov for the first time.
- April 3 – Jennifer Ringley becomes an early practitioner of lifecasting (video stream), from her dorm room at Dickinson College in Carlisle, Pennsylvania.
- October – The Shetland Times and The Shetland News become involved in a landmark legal case over alleged copyright infringement and deep linking in their websites.
- The page ranking web search engine RankDex is originated by Robin Li.
- Brewster Kahle, with Bruce Gilliat, develops the Wayback Machine software to crawl and archive World Wide Web pages.
- Lov Grover, at Bell Labs, publishes the quantum database search algorithm.
- IRCnet is founded.

== Exploration ==
- May 23 – Swede Göran Kropp reaches Mount Everest summit alone without oxygen after having bicycled there from Sweden.

== Medicine ==
- March
  - The Cochrane Library launched.
  - The role of CCR5 in HIV/AIDS infection begins to be published.
- July 7–12 – XI International AIDS Conference, 1996, Vancouver, reports major advances in the management of HIV/AIDS including combination therapy (the "triple cocktail") using protease inhibitors. Within a week after the conference, over 75,000 patients who have been using antibiotics and chemotherapy as treatment against opportunistic infections begin an effective antiviral regimen which greatly increases their immune system strength and therefore their health.
- New variant Creutzfeldt–Jakob disease first identified in humans, in the United Kingdom.
- Montreal Cognitive Assessment is created by Ziad Nasreddine in Montreal, Quebec.
- Donepezil (Aricept), a palliative treatment for moderate Alzheimer's disease, is approved in the United States.
- Sildenafil (Viagra), a treatment for erectile dysfunction, is patented by Pfizer.

== Meteorology ==
- January 7 – A large blizzard hits the Eastern United States, killing 60.
- May 15 – Severe thunderstorms and a tornado in Bangladesh kills at least 443 people.
- July 18–21 – Storms provoke severe flooding on the Saguenay River in Quebec, in one of Canada's most costly natural disasters.

== Paleontology ==
- August – The first fossil specimen of the dinosaur named Sinosauropteryx prima is uncovered in China; it is the first theropod to show evidence of feathers.

== Philosophy ==
- Australian philosopher David Chalmers publishes The Conscious Mind: in search of a fundamental theory.

== Technology ==
- Zenith introduces the first HDTV-compatible front projection television in the United States. Broadcasters, TV & PC manufacturers set industry standards for digital HDTV.
- APS film format is introduced.

== Publications ==
- May – Sokal affair: American mathematical physicist Alan Sokal hoaxes the editors into publishing a deliberately nonsensical paper, "Transgressing the Boundaries: Toward a Transformative Hermeneutics of Quantum Gravity", in a "science wars" issue of the journal Social Text (Duke University Press) as a critique of the intellectual rigor of postmodernism in academic cultural studies.
- Belgian physical chemist Ilya Prigogine publishes La Fin des certitudes (translated as The End of Certainty: time, chaos, and the new laws of nature).
- French-born archaeologist Denise Schmandt-Besserat publishes How Writing Came About.

== Awards ==
- Nobel Prize
  - Physics: David M. Lee, Douglas D. Osheroff, Robert C. Richardson
  - Chemistry: Robert Curl, Sir Harold Kroto, Richard Smalley
  - Medicine: Peter C. Doherty, Rolf M. Zinkernagel
- Kyoto Prize
  - Willard Van Orman Quine is awarded the Kyoto Prize in Arts and Philosophy for his "outstanding contributions to the progress of philosophy in the 20th century by proposing numerous theories based on keen insights in logic, epistemology, philosophy of science and philosophy of language."
- Turing Award for Computing: Amir Pnueli
- Wollaston Medal for Geology: Nicholas John Shackleton

== Births ==
- July 5 – Dolly (d. 2003), Scottish sheep, the world's first cloned mammal.

== Deaths ==
- January 12 – Bartel Leendert van der Waerden (b. 1903), Dutch mathematician.
- February 20 – Solomon Asch (b. 1907), Polish American social psychologist.
- March 19 – Chen Jingrun (b. 1933), Chinese mathematician.
- March 26 – David Packard (b. 1912), American electrical engineer.
- June 6 – George Davis Snell (b. 1903), American mouse geneticist and basic transplant immunologist.
- June 17 – Thomas Kuhn (b. 1922), American philosopher of science.
- August 1 – Tadeusz Reichstein (b. 1897), Polish-Swiss winner of the Nobel Prize in Chemistry.
- August 9 – Sir Frank Whittle (b. 1907), English aeronautical engineer.
- August 12 – Victor Ambartsumian (b. 1908), Soviet Armenian theoretical astrophysicist.
- September 1 – Karl Kehrle (Brother Adam) (b. 1898), British Benedictine monk and beekeeper.
- September 10 – Hans List (b. 1896), Austrian inventor.
- September 20 – Paul Erdős (b. 1913), Hungarian-born mathematician.
- October 5 – Seymour Cray (b. 1925), American supercomputer architect.
- November 13 – Bobbie Vaile (b. 1959), Australian astrophysicist.
- November 19 – Grace Bates (b. 1914), American mathematician.
- November 21 – Abdus Salam (b. 1926), Punjabi-born winner of the Nobel Prize in Physics.
- December 20 – Carl Sagan (b. 1934), American astronomer.
