= 1919 in science =

The year 1919 in science and technology involved some significant events, listed below.

== Astronomy ==
- April – George Ellery Hale and collaborators publish their discovery that the magnetic polarity of sunspot pairs reverses on an 11-year solar cycle and that the polarity varies by hemisphere, which becomes known as Hale's law.
- The International Astronomical Union is established in Paris.

== Chemistry ==
- June 1 – The term covalence in relation to chemical bonding is first used by Irving Langmuir.
- F. W. Aston discovers multiple stable isotopes for neon.

== History of science ==
- Leonard Eugene Dickson begins publication of History of the Theory of Numbers.

== Mathematics ==
- Viggo Brun proves Brun's theorem B_{2} for twin primes.
- G. H. Hardy rediscovers Pisot–Vijayaraghavan numbers in the context of Diophantine approximation.

== Medicine ==
- Dr George Newman is appointed as the first Chief Medical Officer to the Ministry of Health in England and Wales.

== Physics ==
- May 29 – Einstein's theory of general relativity is tested by Arthur Eddington's observation of the "bending of light" during the total solar eclipse on this day observed in Principe, and by Andrew Crommelin in Sobral, Ceará, Brazil (confirmed November 6).
- Arnold Sommerfeld and Walther Kossel publish their displacement law.
- James Jeans discovers that the dynamical constants of motion determine the distribution function for a system of particles.
- Betz's law is published by German physicist Albert Betz, indicating the maximum power that can be extracted from the wind, independent of the design of a wind turbine in open flow.

== Psychology ==
- In Berlin Dr Magnus Hirschfeld and Arthur Kronfeld found the Institut für Sexualwissenschaft.

== Technology ==
- First crossings of the Atlantic Ocean by air.
  - May 8–27 – United States Navy Curtiss flying boat NC-4 commanded by Albert Cushing Read makes the first transatlantic flight, from Naval Air Station Rockaway to Lisbon via Newfoundland and the Azores.
  - June 14–15 – A Vickers Vimy flown by John Alcock and Arthur Whitten Brown makes the first nonstop transatlantic flight, from St. John's, Newfoundland, to Clifden, Ireland.
  - July 2–6 – British airship R34 makes the first transatlantic flight by dirigible, and the first westbound flight, from RAF East Fortune, Scotland, to Mineola, New York.
- May 29 – Charles Strite files a United States patent for the electric pop-up bread toaster.
- October 17 – Dr. Frank Conrad begins broadcasting from 8XK at home in Wilkinsburg, Pennsylvania (United States).
- Lee De Forest files his first United States patent for the Phonofilm sound-on-film process.
- United States firearms designer John Browning finalizes the design of the M1919 Browning machine gun.
- United States firearms designer John T. Thompson finalizes the design of the Thompson submachine gun.
- A United States patent for the self-folding shirt collar is obtained by the Phillips-Jones Corporation.

== Awards ==
- Nobel Prize
  - Physics – Johannes Stark
  - Chemistry – not awarded
  - Medicine – Jules Bordet

== Births ==
- January 23 – Hans Hass (died 2013), Austrian zoologist and oceanographer.
- February 25 – Karl H. Pribram (died 2015), Austrian-American neuroscientist.
- April 1 – Joseph Murray (died 2012), American Nobel Prize-winning transplant surgeon.
- June 22 – Henri Tajfel (died 1982), Polish-born social psychologist.
- July 26 – James Lovelock (died 2022), English environmentalist and futurologist.
- August 12 – Margaret Burbidge, born Eleanor Margaret Peachey (died 2020), English-born American astronomer.
- August 30 – Maurice Hilleman (died 2005), American vaccinologist.
- September 6 – Wilson Greatbatch (died 2011), American biomedical engineer.
- September 21 – Mario Bunge (died 2020), Argentine-born philosopher of science.
- November 10 – Mikhail Kalashnikov (died 2013), Russian small arms designer.
- December 8 – Kateryna Yushchenko (died 2001), Ukrainian computer scientist and academic.

== Deaths ==
- January 15 – Rosa Luxemburg (born 1871), Polish Marxist theorist, philosopher, economist, anti-war activist, and revolutionary socialist.
- February 19 – Frederick DuCane Godman (born 1834), English lepidopterist, entomologist and ornithologist.
- April 4 – Sir William Crookes (born 1832), English chemist and physicist.
- April 8 – Loránd Eötvös (born 1848), Hungarian physicist.
- April 17 – Bernhard Sigmund Schultze (born 1827), German obstetrician.
- May 8 – LaMarcus Adna Thompson (born 1848), American inventor.
- c. June 1 – Caroline Still Anderson (born 1848), African American physician, educator and activist.
- June 30 – John William Strutt, 3rd Baron Rayleigh (born 1842), English Nobel Prize-winning physicist.
- July 15 – Emil Fischer (born 1852), German Nobel Prize-winning chemist (suicide).
- July 21 – Gustaf Retzius (born 1842), Swedish anatomist.
- August 8 – Ernst Haeckel (born 1834), German zoologist.
- August 23 – Augustus George Vernon Harcourt (born 1834), English chemist.
- November 23 – Henry Gantt (born 1861), American project engineer.
- December 16 – Julia Lermontova (born 1846), Russian chemist.
- December 29 – Sir William Osler (born 1849), Canadian-born physician.
