= 1848 in science =

The year 1848 in science and technology involved some significant events, listed below.

== Events ==
- September 20 – The American Association for the Advancement of Science is set up in Pennsylvania by re-formation of the Association of American Geologists and Naturalists, with William Charles Redfield as its first president.

== Astronomy ==
- September 16 – William Cranch Bond and William Lassell discover Hyperion, Saturn's moon.
- Lord Rosse studies M1 and names it the Crab Nebula.
- Édouard Roche calculates the Roche limit, the limiting radius of tidal destruction and tidal creation for a body held together only by its own gravity, which explains why the rings of Saturn do not condense into a satellite.
- Rudolf Wolf (in Zürich) devises a way of quantifying sunspot activity, the Wolf number.

== Botany ==
- April 16 – Joseph Dalton Hooker arrives at Darjeeling to begin the first European plant collecting expedition in the Himalayas.

== Chemistry ==
- Edward Frankland, working in Germany, discovers the organometallic compound diethylzinc.

== Exploration ==
- Admiral Nevelskoi demonstrates that the Strait of Tartary is a strait.

== Medicine ==
- September 13 – Vermont railroad worker Phineas Gage survives a 3-foot-plus (1 m) iron rod being driven through his head, providing a demonstration of the effects of damage to the brain's frontal lobe.
- November 1 – The first medical school for women, The Boston Female Medical School, opens in Boston, Massachusetts.
- Alfred Baring Garrod recognises that excess uric acid in the blood is the cause of gout.
- Rudolf Virchow produces a Report on the Typhus Epidemic in Upper Silesia advocating broad social as well as public health measures to counter such outbreaks.

== Physics ==
- Lord Kelvin establishes concept of absolute zero, the temperature at which all molecular motion ceases.
- Nicholas Callan of Maynooth College invents an improved form of battery.
- Hippolyte Fizeau and John Scott Russell present studies of the Doppler effect in electromagnetic and sound waves respectively.

== Technology ==
- August 15 – James Warren submits a U.K. patent application for the Warren truss.
- James Bogardus erects the first free-standing cast-iron architectural façade, the Milhau Pharmacy Building in New York City.
- French civil engineer A. Boucher promotes the ribbed ("false") skew arch.
- Completion of palm houses at Kew Gardens, London, and the National Botanic Gardens, Glasnevin, by Richard Turner of Dublin.
- Jonathan J. Couch of Philadelphia, PA, invents a "percussion drill" (jackhammer).
- Walter Hunt of New York patents his "Volition" repeating rifle, although it is not practicable at this time.
- Joseph-Louis Lambot constructs the first ferrocement boat, in France.
- Linus Yale Sr., invents the modern pin tumbler lock.
- John Stringfellow flies a steam-powered monoplane model for a short distance in a powered glide in England.

== Awards ==
- Copley Medal: John Couch Adams
- Wollaston Medal for Geology: William Buckland

== Births ==
- March 8 – LaMarcus Adna Thompson (died 1919), American inventor.
- April 9 – Sebastian Ziani de Ferranti (died 1930), British-born electrical engineer and inventor
- May 23 – Otto Lilienthal (died 1896), German aviation pioneer.
- June 12 – Albertina Carlsson (died 1930) Swedish zoologist.
- June 22 – William Macewen (died 1924), Scottish surgeon.
- July 7 – Cuthbert Hilton Golding-Bird (died 1939), English surgeon.
- July 27 – Loránd Eötvös (died 1919), Hungarian physicist.
- August 14 – Margaret Lindsay (died 1915), Irish astronomer.
- November 1 – Caroline Still Anderson (died 1919), African American physician, educator and activist.
- November 8 – Gottlob Frege (died 1925), German mathematician.
- November 27 – Henry A. Rowland (died 1901), American physicist.

== Deaths ==
- January 9 – Caroline Herschel (born 1750), German astronomer.
- January 12 – Christophe-Paulin de La Poix de Fréminville (born 1787), French explorer and naturalist.
- January 24 – Horace Wells, American dentist, pioneer of the use of anesthesia, suicide (born 1815).
- August 7 – Jöns Jakob Berzelius (born 1779), Swedish chemist.
- August 12 – George Stephenson (born 1781), English locomotive engineer.
- December 18 – Bernard Bolzano (born 1781), Bohemian mathematician.
