= 1934 in science =

The year 1934 in science and technology involved some significant events, listed below.

== Astronomy ==
- Richard Tolman shows that black-body radiation in an expanding universe cools but remains thermal.
- Georges Lemaître interprets the cosmological constant as due to a vacuum energy with an unusual perfect fluid equation of state.

== Chemistry ==
- The Mulliken scale of chemical element electronegativity is developed by Robert S. Mulliken.
- Norman Haworth and Edmund Hirst report the first synthesis of vitamin C.
- J. D. Bernal and Dorothy Crowfoot first successfully apply the technique of X-ray crystallography to analysis of a biological substance, pepsin.
- The first commercial heavy water plant is built at Vemork in Norway; production also starts this year at Dnepropetrovsk in the Soviet Union.

== History of science and technology ==
- January 18 – The Iron Bridge in Shropshire, dating from the Industrial Revolution period, becomes an officially scheduled monument in England.
- Lewis Mumford publishes Technics and Civilization.

== Mathematics ==
- Penrose triangle devised.

== Physics ==
- March 25 – Enrico Fermi publishes his discovery of neutron activation of radioactive decay.
- Sonoluminescence is discovered at the University of Cologne.
- Gregory Breit and John A. Wheeler describe the Breit–Wheeler process.
- Henri Coandă obtains his first patent, in France, on the Coandă effect.

== Physiology and medicine ==
- March 8 – Sodium thiopental, the first intravenous anesthetic, synthesized by Ernest H. Volwiler with Donalee L. Tabern of Abbott Laboratories, is first administered to human subjects.
- November 1 – William F. Wells publishes the Wells curve (or Wells evaporation falling curve of droplets) giving an explanation of the behavior of exhaled respiratory droplets and their influence on the transmission of infectious respiratory diseases.
- Outbreak of "atypical poliomyelitis", strongly resembling what would later be called chronic fatigue syndrome, affects a large number of medical staff at the Los Angeles County Hospital.
- George de Hevesy uses heavy water in one of the first biological tracer experiments, to estimate the rate of turnover of water in the human body.
- Austrian biochemist Regina Kapeller-Adler develops an innovative early pregnancy test based on the presence of histidine in urine.
- Tudor Thomas' work on corneal grafting restores the sight of a man who had been nearly blind for 27 years.

== Technology ==
- April 3 – Percy Shaw patents the cat's eye road-safety device in Britain.
- April 18 – Citroën Traction Avant introduced, the world's first front-wheel drive monocoque (welded steel unit body) production automobile, designed by André Lefèbvre and Flaminio Bertoni.
- April 24 – Laurens Hammond patents the Hammond organ in the United States.
- The 135 film cartridge is introduced in Germany and the United States with the Kodak Retina camera, making 35mm film easy to use.
- The first commercial electronic television sets with cathode-ray tubes are manufactured by Telefunken in Germany.

== Publications ==
- Samuel C. Bradford proposes Bradford's law of scattering, an example of Pareto distribution applicable in the bibliometrics of scientific literature and beyond.
- Karl Popper publishes Logik der Forschung.

== Awards ==
- Nobel Prize
  - Physics: not awarded
  - Chemistry: Harold Clayton Urey
  - Physiology or Medicine: George Hoyt Whipple, George Richards Minot, William Parry Murphy

== Births ==
- February 15 – Niklaus Wirth (died 2024), Swiss computer scientist.
- March 4 – Janez Strnad, Slovenian physicist.
- March 5 – Daniel Kahneman (died 2024), Israeli-American psychologist, winner of the Nobel Memorial Prize in Economic Sciences.
- March 6 – Milton Diamond, American sexologist and professor of anatomy and reproductive biology.
- March 9 – Yuri Gagarin (died 1968), Russian cosmonaut, the first man in space.
- March 14 – Eugene Cernan (died 2017), American astronaut, the last man to walk on the Moon (1972).
- March 23 – Ludvig Faddeev (died 2017), Russian mathematician and theoretical physicist.
- March 31 – Carlo Rubbia, Italian winner of the Nobel Prize in Physics.
- April 2 – Paul Cohen (died 2007), American mathematician, winner of the Fields Medal.
- April 3 – Jane Goodall (died 2025), English primatologist.
- April – Dona Strauss, South African-born mathematician.
- May 21 – Bengt I. Samuelsson, Swedish biochemist, winner of the Nobel Prize in Physiology or Medicine.
- May 23
  - Robert Moog (died 2005), American pioneer of electronic music.
  - Willie Hobbs Moore (died 1994), African American engineer.
- May 30 – Alexei Leonov (died 2019), Russian cosmonaut, the first man to walk in space.
- July 7 – Robert McNeill Alexander (died 2016), British zoologist, authority on animal locomotion.
- September 21 – David J. Thouless (died 2019), Scottish-born winner of the Nobel Prize in Physics.
- November 9 – Carl Sagan (died 1996), American astronomer.
- November 27 – Gilbert Strang, American mathematician.

== Deaths ==
- January 6 – Fernand Lataste (born 1847), French zoologist.
- January 14 – Ioan Cantacuzino (born 1863), Romanian microbiologist.
- January 29 – Fritz Haber (born 1868), German chemist.
- February 25 – Elizabeth Gertrude Britton (born 1858), American botanist.
- April 9 – Oskar von Miller (born 1855), German electrical engineer and founder of the Deutsches Museum.
- April 10 – Cecilia Grierson (born 1859), Argentine physician and reformer.
- April 21 – Carsten Borchgrevink (born 1864), Norwegian Antarctic explorer.
- July 4 – Marie Curie (born 1867), Polish-born French physicist.
- October 17 – Santiago Ramón y Cajal (born 1852), Spanish winner of the Nobel Prize in Physiology or Medicine.
- September 27 – Ellen Willmott (born 1858), English horticulturist.
- November 16 – Carl von Linde (born 1842), German refrigeration engineer.
- November 20 – Willem de Sitter (born 1872), Dutch mathematician, physicist and astronomer.
- December 2 – T. H. E. C. Espin (born 1858), English astronomer, scientist and clergyman.
- December 10 – Theobald Smith (born 1859), American bacteriologist.
- December 31 – Cornelia Clapp (born 1859), American marine biologist
- William Hoskins (born 1862), American inventor.
