= 1845 in science =

The year 1845 in science and technology involved some significant events, listed below.

== Astronomy ==
- April – Lord Rosse discovers that the nebula M51 has a spiral structure.
- September–October – Cornish mathematician John Couch Adams communicates to James Challis and George Biddell Airy his calculations demonstrating that a body (Neptune) is perturbing the orbit of Uranus.
- November 10 – Urbain Le Verrier presents to the Académie des sciences in Paris a memoir showing that existing theories fail to account for the motion of Uranus.
- Construction begins in Ireland of the "Leviathan of Parsonstown", a telescope built by Lord Rosse.

== Biology ==
- August–September – Previously unknown Potato blight strikes the potato crop in Ireland: start of the Great Famine.

== Chemistry ==
- March 17 – Stephen Perry patents the rubber band in England.
- Edmond Frémy discovers the oxidizing agent Frémy's salt.

== Exploration ==
- August – John Franklin's expedition with HMS Erebus and HMS Terror to find the Northwest Passage is last seen entering Baffin Bay prior to its mysterious disappearance.

== Medicine ==
- December 27 – Anesthesia is used in childbirth for the first time, by Dr Crawford Long in Jefferson, Georgia.

== Physics ==
- September 13 – Michael Faraday discovers that an intense magnetic field can rotate the plane of polarized light, the Faraday effect.
- C. H. D. Buys Ballot confirms the Doppler effect for sound waves.
- Kirchhoff's circuit laws are first described by German physicist Gustav Kirchhoff.

== Technology ==
- July 26–August 10 – Isambard Kingdom Brunel’s iron steamship Great Britain makes the Transatlantic Crossing from Liverpool to New York, the first screw propelled vessel to make the passage.
- The saxhorn family of valved brass instruments is patented by Adolphe Sax in France.

== Publications ==
- January 14 – Physikalische Gesellschaft zu Berlin established and begins publishing Fortschritte der Physik and Verhandlungen.
- August 28 – The journal Scientific American begins publication.
- Alexander von Humboldt's Kosmos: Entwurf einer physischen Weltbeschreibung begins publication.

== Awards ==
- Copley Medal: Theodor Schwann
- Wollaston Medal for Geology: John Phillips

== Births ==
- February 17 (Old Style March 1) – Fyodor Pirotsky (died 1898), Ukrainian-born Russian military and electrical engineer and inventor.
- March 3 – Georg Cantor (died 1918), Russian-born German mathematician.
- March 27 – Wilhelm Röntgen (died 1923), German physicist, discoverer of X-rays, Nobel laureate.
- April 21 – William Healey Dall (died 1927), American malacologist and explorer.
- May 4 – William Kingdon Clifford (died 1879), English geometer.
- May 16 – Élie Metchnikoff (died 1916), Russian-born microbiologist, Nobel laureate.
- June 16 – Heinrich Dressel (died 1920), German archaeologist.
- July 4 – Thomas Barnardo (died 1905), Irish-born physician and philanthropist.
- September 11 – Émile Baudot (died 1903), French telegraph engineer.
- November 14 – Ulisse Dini (died 1918), Italian mathematician.

== Deaths ==
- January 11 – Etheldred Benett (born 1776), British geologist.
- March 13 – John Frederic Daniell (born 1790), English chemist and physicist.
- March 18 – 'Johnny Appleseed' (John Chapman) (born 1774), American nurseryman.
- April 10 – Thomas Sewall (born 1786), American anatomist.
- October 18 – Dominique, comte de Cassini (born 1748), French astronomer.
- Jean Henri Jaume Saint-Hilaire (born 1772), French botanist.
