= Laura Alberta Linton =

American chemist

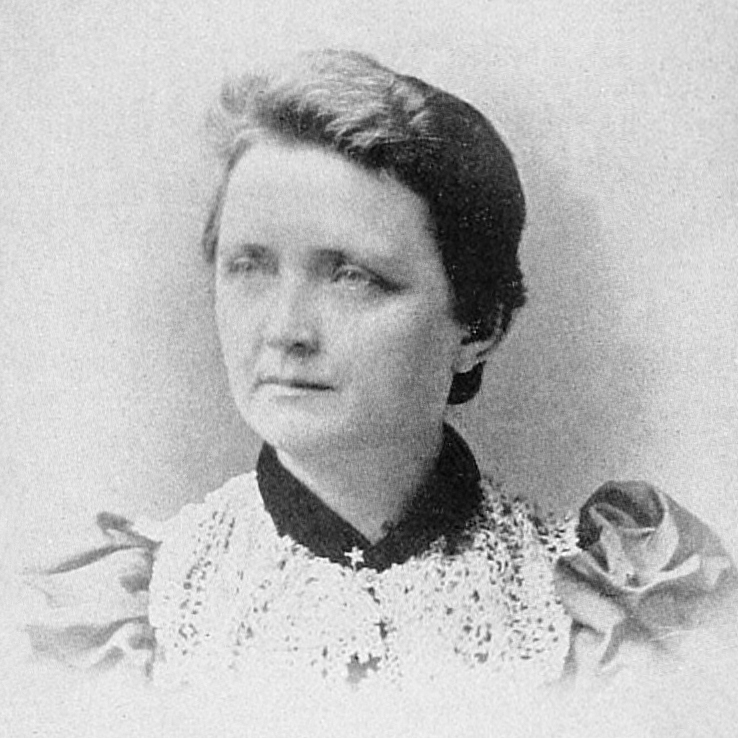
- Laura Alberta Linton, for whom lintonite is named
- Born: April 8, 1853; Mahoning County, Ohio
- Died: April 1, 1915 (aged 61); Rochester, Minnesota
- Education: University of Minnesota
- Scientific career
- Fields: Chemistry, medicine

Signature
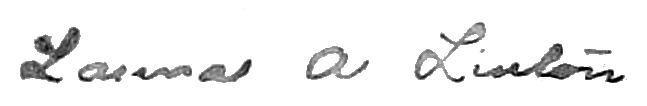

Laura Alberta Linton (April 8, 1853 – April 1, 1915) was an American chemist and physician.

== Early life and education ==
Linton was born in Mahoning County, Ohio, on April 8, 1853, the oldest child of Joseph and Christina Linton. The family were Quakers. The family farmed in Ohio, Pennsylvania, and New Jersey before settling in Wabasha County, Minnesota. Linton graduated from the Winona Normal School in 1872, and went on to the University of Minnesota, from which she graduated with a Bachelor of Science in chemistry.

== Career ==
=== Career in Chemistry ===
During her senior year of college, Linton analyzed mineral specimens from the northern shore of Lake Superior that were collected by her professors, Stephen Farnum Peckham and Christopher W. Hall. The mineral was similar to thomsonite, but Linton's analysis found distinctive physical characteristics, including crystalline structure and color. In their published description of the mineral, Peckham and Hall determined it to be a distinct variety, naming it lintonite in recognition of Linton's "patient effort and skill."

After graduating, Linton taught high school for two years in Lake City, Minnesota. Linton then spent two years in Providence, Rhode Island, assisting Peckham with his Report on the Production, Technology, and Uses of Petroleum and Its Products for the 1880 United States census. In the "Letter of Transmittal" of his report, Peckham thanks Linton, "to whose varied accomplishments I am indebted for many of the translations and illustrations that add completeness and embellishment to the work..."

In 1882, Linton spent two semesters studying chemistry at the Massachusetts Institute of Technology. Linton did not complete her graduate program, but instead she accepted the position of Conger Professor of Natural Science at Lombard University in Galesburg, Illinois. She held the position for one year and then returned to Minneapolis. For the next ten years, Linton taught at Minneapolis Central High School in Minneapolis, Minnesota, as head of the science department.

Around 1894, Linton returned to chemistry research, specifically the analysis of asphaltum. She obtained samples from Peckham, who was connected with the Union Oil Company of California. In 1895–1896, Linton attended the University of Michigan, but did not receive a degree. Her work on asphaltum appeared in two papers published by the American Chemical Society in 1894 and 1896. She was recognized for her careful analytical work, the clarity of her presentation, and the commercial importance of her research. A third paper, co-authored with Peckham, on Trinidad pitch, also appeared in 1896; it was the basis of expert testimony given in an important lawsuit.

=== Career in medicine ===
Linton then left the field of chemistry and pursued a career in medicine. The reasons for her change of discipline are the subject of speculation. Perhaps there was a family influence, as a brother, Thomas Linton, and a sister, Sarah Linton Phelps, were both physicians.

From 1895 to 1900, Linton was an assistant in physiology and physiological chemistry at University of Minnesota; she earned an M.D. from that institution in 1900.

Immediately after graduating, Linton accepted a position at Rochester State Hospital, taking the place of her sister Sarah, who was in failing health. Laura worked at the hospital for the final fifteen years of her life. She made two significant contributions to the hospital. First, she taught a course to the nurses on dietary principles; second, Linton instituted a supervised program for mentally ill female patients, in which they were allowed to do needlework and handicrafts. This was one of the first ever hospital programs to use occupational therapy.

Linton was a member of the American Association for the Advancement of Science and the Association for the Advancement of Women.

== Later life and death ==
Linton died on April 1, 1915, in Rochester, Minnesota.

== Selected publications ==
- Linton, Laura A. (December 1894). "On the Technical Analysis of Asphaltum". Journal of the American Chemical Society. 16 (12): 809–822. doi:10.1021/ja02110a005.
- Linton, Laura A. (March 1896). "On the Technical Analysis of Asphaltum, No. 2". Journal of the American Chemical Society. 18 (3): 275–279. doi:10.1021/ja02089a013.
- Peckham, Stephen Farnum; Linton, Laura A. (March 1, 1896). "On Trinidad Pitch". American Journal of Science. 4. 1 (3): 193–207. Bibcode:1896AmJS....1..193P. doi:10.2475/ajs.s4-1.3.193.
