= 2001 in science =

The year 2001 in science and technology involved many events, some of which are included below.

== Astronomy and space exploration ==
- February 12 – The NEAR Shoemaker spacecraft lands in the "saddle" region of 433 Eros, becoming the first spacecraft to land on an asteroid.
- June 21 – Solar eclipse of June 21, 2001, a total eclipse.
- August 8 – NASA's Genesis spacecraft is launched.
- October 15 – NASA's Galileo spacecraft passes within 112 miles (180 km) of Jupiter's moon Io.
- November 27 – The Hubble Space Telescope detects sodium in the atmosphere of HD 209458 b, the first exoplanet atmosphere to be measured.
- December 14 – Solar eclipse of December 14, 2001, an annular eclipse.

== Biology ==
- January 8 – The first animal from an endangered species produced by cloning, a gaur named Noah, is born at Trans Ova Genetics in Sioux Center, Iowa. He dies within 48 hours of a common dysentery.
- January – The second animal from an endangered species produced by cloning, a European mouflon lamb, is born in Italy.
- February – The publicly funded Human Genome Project, led by Francis Collins and the privately funded Celera effort, led by Craig Venter simultaneously publish their decoding of the human genome (in Nature and Science, respectively).
- April 6 – Linda Partridge and colleagues publish their identification of the role of a specific gene in animal ageing.
- April 19 – Pygmy three-toed sloth first described.
- Craig Venter and Mark Adams complete the genetic map of the laboratory mouse.
- Fossil remains of the whale Rodhocetus balochistanensis found in Balochistan province, Pakistan, by Philip D. Gingerich.

== Chemistry ==
- February 15 – Production of a capsule-based fibre-reinforced polymer composite self-healing material is announced.

== Computer science ==
- January 9 – Apple Inc. releases the iTunes media player (modified from SoundJam MP).
- January 15 – Wikipedia launches on the internet.
- May – Tim Berners-Lee and colleagues name the Semantic Web.
- August 24 – Windows XP personal computer operating system released by Microsoft; it is available for retail sale on October 25.
- October 23 – Apple Inc. unveil the first generation iPod portable media player.
- December 1–2 – The Budapest Open Access Initiative, a public statement of principles promoting open access to research literature, is launched at a conference convened in Budapest by the Open Society Institute.
- December – The C# programming language specification is released.
- In quantum computing, the first working 7-qubit NMR computer is demonstrated at IBM's Almaden Research Center, demonstrating Shor's algorithm.
- Chatterbot Eugene Goostman is developed.
- The Walkman Circ is released.

== Medicine ==
- July 2 – The world's first self-contained artificial heart is implanted in Robert Tools in the United States.
- Adult-onset basal ganglia disease caused by Ferritin light chain (FTL) mutations is described.

== Paleontology ==
- July – First fossil skull fragments of the hominid 'Toumaï' (Sahelanthropus tchadensis; 7 million years BP) found by a team led by Michel Brunet in Chad.

== Physics ==
- Francisco-Miguel Marqués and co-workers at the Grand Accélérateur National d'Ions Lourds in Caen claim to detect a tetraneutron; reproducibility of this observation has not been possible.

== Awards ==
- Nobel Prizes
  - Physics – Eric Allin Cornell, Wolfgang Ketterle, Carl E. Wieman
  - Chemistry – William S. Knowles, Ryōji Noyori, K. Barry Sharpless
  - Medicine – Leland H. Hartwell, R. Timothy Hunt, Paul M. Nurse
- Turing Award: Ole-Johan Dahl, Kristen Nygaard
- Wollaston Medal for Geology: Harry Blackmore Whittington

== Deaths ==
- February 9 – Herbert A. Simon (b. 1916), American polymath, recipient of the Nobel Memorial Prize in Economic Sciences.
- February 13 – Ugo Fano (b. 1912), Italian-born American physicist.
- February 24 – Claude Shannon (b. 1916), American mathematician.
- March 31 – Clifford Shull (b. 1915), American physicist, Nobel Prize laureate
- May 5 – Wang Yinglai (b. 1907), Chinese biochemist.
- May 8 – William T. Stearn (b. 1911), English botanist.
- May 28 – Francisco Varela (b. 1946), Chilean biologist and philosopher.
- June 4 – Lu Jiaxi (b. 1915), Chinese physical chemist.
- June 18 – René Dumont (b. 1904), French agronomist.
- June 26 – John F. Yardley (b. 1925), American aeronautical engineer.
- August 9 – Sir Alec Skempton (b. 1914), English pioneer of soil science and engineering historian.
- August 15 – Kateryna Yushchenko (b. 1919), Ukrainian computer scientist and academic.
- August 20 – Sir Fred Hoyle (b. 1915), English astronomer and science fiction writer.
- August 31 – Doris Calloway (Nesheim) (b. 1923), American nutritionist.
- September 2 – Christiaan Barnard (b. 1922), South African cardiac surgeon.
- October 31 – Warren Elliot Henry (b. 1909), African American physicist.
- November 30 – Robert Tools (b. 1942), American first recipient of a self-contained artificial heart, after 151 days without a living heart.
- December 5 – Franco Rasetti (b. 1901), Italian American nuclear physicist.
- December 12 – Robert Schommer (b. 1946), American astronomer.
