= Dagobert Müller von Thomamühl =

- Born: 24 June 1880; Trieste
- Died: 10 January 1956 (aged 75); Klagenfurt
- Engineering career
- Discipline: Civil, Mechanical, Naval architect
- Projects: Photoelectric switch
- Significant design: torpedoes and hovercraft

Dagobert Müller von Thomamühl (24 June 1880 in Trieste – 10 January 1956 in Klagenfurt) was an Austrian naval officer and inventor.

== Life ==
Dagobert Müller-Thomamühl attended from 1890 to 1895 the secondary school in Pula and from 1895 to 1899 the Imperial and Royal Naval Academy in Fiume. He took part in 1900/1901 as a midshipman on the global circumnavigation by the covered screw corvette, SMS Donau (SMS Danube). From 1904 to 1918 he was commander and flotilla leader on torpedo boats and destroyers. In 1910 he founded the diving school of the Imperial and Royal Austro-Hungarian War Navy and reached, as the first non-armored diver, the depth of 64 m in the Mediterranean.

Müller-Thomamühl designed directional controllers for torpedoes and torpedo search equipment and in 1915 built the first rigid walled air cushion torpedo speedboat. He founded the torpedo command of the Austrian navy and in 1918 made experiments with aircraft torpedoes. He was also the inventor of the photoelectric switch. This device was ready for use in 1916 and was patented in Austria in 1924. In the inter-war period Müller-Thomamühl built a car factory in Marburg (Drau) and in Croatia some hydroelectric power stations. He led until 1945 a technical office and a trading company for the representation of shipyards and marine equipment.
