= 1908 in science =

The year 1908 in science and technology involved some significant events, listed below.

== Archaeology ==
- March – A 40,000-year-old Neanderthal boy skeleton is found at Le Moustier in southwest France by Otto Hauser.

== Astronomy ==
- If its start and end are defined using mean solar time then due to the extreme length of day variation this is the longest year of the Julian calendar or Gregorian calendar, having a duration of 31622401.38 seconds of Terrestrial Time (or ephemeris time).
- January 3 – The total solar eclipse of January 3, 1908 is visible in the Pacific Ocean and is the 46th solar eclipse of Solar Saros 130.
- June 28 – The annular solar eclipse of June 28, 1908 is visible from Central America, North America, Atlantic Ocean and Africa and is the 33rd solar eclipse of Solar Saros 135.
- June 30 [O.S. June 17 ] – Tunguska event in Siberia, an explosion believed to have been caused by the air burst of a large meteoroid or comet fragment at an altitude of 5–10 kilometres (3–6 mi) above the Earth's surface.
- November – George Ellery Hale publishes his observation that sunspots have a magnetic field.
- December 23 – The hybrid solar eclipse of December 23, 1908 is visible from Atlantic Ocean and is the 23rd solar eclipse of Solar Saros 140.

== Chemistry ==
- Kikunae Ikeda discovers monosodium glutamate, the chemical behind the taste of umami.
- Heike Kamerlingh Onnes liquefies helium.

== Climatology ==
- This is the coldest recorded year since 1880, according to NASA reports.

== Earth sciences ==
- December 28 – The 7.1 M_{w} 1908 Messina earthquake shakes Southern Italy with a maximum Mercalli intensity of XI (Extreme).

== Genetics ==
- July – G. H. Hardy and Wilhelm Weinberg independently formulate the Hardy–Weinberg principle which states that both allele and genotype frequencies in a population remain in equilibrium unless disturbed.

== History of science ==
- Site of Ulugh Beg Observatory located in Samarkand by Russian archaeologist V. L. Vyatkin.
- National Technical Museum (Prague) founded.

== Mathematics ==
- Ernst Zermelo axiomizes set theory, thus avoiding Cantor's contradictions.
- Josip Plemelj solves the Riemann problem about the existence of a differential equation with a given monodromic group and uses Sokhotsky-Plemelj formulae.
- Student's t-distribution published by William Sealy Gosset (pseudonymously).

== Paleontology ==
- c. September – Edmontosaurus mummy AMNH 5060, an exceptionally well-preserved fossil dinosaur, is discovered near Lusk, Wyoming.

== Physics ==
- Hans Geiger and Ernest Rutherford invent the Geiger counter.
- Gustav Mie publishes the Mie solution to Maxwell's equations on the scattering of electromagnetic radiation by a sphere.

== Physiology and medicine ==
- April 27 – First Congress for Freudian Psychology, held in Salzburg.
- Swiss psychiatrist Eugen Bleuler introduces the term schizophrenia.
- Austrian American pathologist Leo Buerger gives the first accurate pathological description of Thromboangiitis obliterans ("Buerger's disease") at Mount Sinai Hospital (Manhattan).
- Victor Horsley and R. Clarke invents the stereotactic method.
- Margaret Reed Lewis, working in Berlin, becomes probably the first person successfully to grow mammalian tissue in vitro.

== Technology ==
- January 12 – A long-distance radio message is sent from the Eiffel Tower for the first time.
- July 8 – The paper coffee filter, created by German housewife Melitta Bentz, is patented.
- June 22 – James M. Spangler patents the upright portable vacuum cleaner in the United States.
- September 27 – The first of Henry Ford's Ford Model T automobiles is produced in Detroit, Michigan.
- December 7 – Lee Newman files a patent for a felt-tipped marker pen in the United States.

== Awards ==
- Nobel Prizes
  - Physics – Gabriel Lippmann
  - Chemistry – Ernest Rutherford
  - Nobel Prize in Physiology or Medicine – Ilya Ilyich Mechnikov and Paul Ehrlich

== Births ==
- January 15 – Edward Teller (died 2003), Hungarian-born physicist, inventor of the hydrogen bomb.
- January 18 – Jacob Bronowski (died 1974), Polish-born scientific polymath.
- January 22 – Lev Davidovich Landau (died 1968), Russian physicist.
- February 11 – Vivian Fuchs (died 1999), English geologist and explorer.
- February 25 – Mary Locke Petermann (died 1975), American cellular biochemist.
- March 15 – Thure von Uexküll (died 2004), German pioneer of psychosomatic medicine.
- May 7 – Leo Sternbach, (died 2005), Polish-born American chemist.
- May 14 – Nicholas Kurti, born Kürti Miklós (died 1998), Hungarian-born physicist.
- May 23 – John Bardeen (died 1991), American physicist, co-inventor of the transistor, only physicist to receive the Nobel Prize in Physics twice.
- September 2 – Nikolai Aleksandrovich Kozyrev (died 1983), Russian astronomer and astrophysicist.
- September 6 – Louis Essen (died 1997), English physicist, co-developer of the first practical atomic clock.
- September 18 – Victor Ambartsumian (died 1996), Soviet Armenian theoretical astrophysicist.
- October 10 – Min Chueh Chang (died 1991), Chinese-born embryologist.
- October 21 – Elsie Widdowson (died 2000), English nutritionist.
- November 4 – Joseph Rotblat (died 2005), Polish-born physicist.
- December 24 – Noël Poynter (died 1979), English medical historian.

== Deaths ==
- January 3 – Charles Augustus Young (born 1834), American astronomer.
- August 25 – Henri Becquerel (born 1852), French physicist.
- November 20 – Georgy Voronoy (born 1868), Russian mathematician.
