= Robert Tools =

American artificial heart recipient (1942–2001)

Robert L. Tools
- Born: July 31, 1942; Mobile, Alabama, U.S.
- Died: November 30, 2001 (aged 59); Kentucky, U.S.
- Occupations: Retired phone company technical librarian and former Chicago Public School teacher
- Spouse: Carol
- Children: 2 adult children; Chandra and Carlin

Robert L. Tools (July 31, 1942 – November 30, 2001) was the world's first recipient of a fully self-contained artificial heart, called AbioCor. The operation took place on July 2, 2001. He survived for 151 days without a living heart. Dr. Joseph Fredi at Saint Thomas Hospital suggested the experimental procedure based on his knowledge of a research project by Abiomed. While recovering from surgery, Robert had the chance to enjoy some of his favorite past time hobbies, fishing and dining out. While at Jewish Hospital, Robert became renowned and received press throughout the world on shows like Cooking Network, Dateline, The Tonight Show with Jay Leno, and CNN. As a result of Robert's press, he received visits from Lt. Governors, The Oak Ridge Boys, and Muhammad Ali. While meeting with Ali, Tools earned the name "#1 Champ" because of his fight to survive.

Due to continued complications of abdominal bleeding and a stroke, Robert died November 30, 2001.

== See also ==
- Barney Clark, the first recipient of the Jarvik-7, a non-self-contained artificial heart.
