= 2003 in science =

The year 2003 was an exciting one for new scientific discoveries and technological breakthroughs progress in many scientific fields. Some of the highlights of 2003, which will be further discussed below, include: the anthropologic discovery of 350,000-year-old footprints attesting to the presence of upright-walking humans; SpaceShipOne flight 11P making its first supersonic flight; the observation of a previously unknown element, moscovium was made; and the world's first digital camera with an organic light-emitting diode (OLED) display is released by Kodak.

The year 2003 is also notable for the disintegration of the Columbia Space Shuttle upon its re-entry into Earth's atmosphere, a tragic disaster which took the lives of all seven astronauts on board; the Concorde jet made its last flight, bringing to an end the era of civilian supersonic travel, at least for the time being; and the death of Edward Teller, physicist and inventor of the hydrogen bomb.

== Anthropology ==
- March 13 – The journal Nature reports that 350,000-year-old upright-walking human footprints have been found in Italy.

== Astronomy ==
Mars retrograde motion during perigee 2003

- February 11 – NASA's WMAP satellite completes the first detailed cosmic microwave background radiation map of the universe. The image reveals the universe is 13.7 billion years old (within one percent error) and provides evidence that supports the inflationary theory.
- May 16 – Total lunar eclipse
- May 31 – Annular solar eclipse in Northern Scotland, Faroe Islands, Greenland, and Iceland, with partial eclipse covering much of Europe and Russia.
- August 27 – Opposition of Mars, closest approach to earth of Mars since 57,617 BC, at a distance of 55,758,006 kilometers.
- August 29 – Discovery of Uranus's irregular moon Margaret (the only one with prograde motion) by Scott S. Sheppard and David C. Jewitt at Mauna Kea Observatory in Hawaii.
- October–November – The Sun is at solar maximum with a period of high activity, generating many large solar flares and coronal mass ejections.
- November 9 – Total lunar eclipse.
- November 14 – Trans-Neptunian object 90377 Sedna, one of the most distant objects in the Solar System, discovered by Palomar Observatory.
- November 23 – Total solar eclipse in Antarctica.
- The 2dF Survey of galaxy redshifts is published.

== Biology ==
- April 1 – A banteng delivered in the United States is the second successful cloning of an endangered species and the first such clone to survive beyond infancy.
- July 30 – A pyrenean ibex clone delivered in Spain is the first, and so far only, successfully cloned extinct subspecies, but the clone died a few minutes later.
- August – The microbe Strain 121 is discovered in the deep biosphere, being able to survive temperatures of 121 °C (250 °F), greater than any other organism.
- October – The last native wild crested ibis in Japan dies.
- October 13 – The open access scientific journal PLoS Biology from the Public Library of Science, commences operation.
- November 20 – A new species of baleen whale, Omura's whale (Balaenoptera omurai), is described by Japanese scientists in the journal Nature.

== Chemistry ==
- August – Chemical elements
  - Moscovium first synthesized.
  - Nihonium first identified.

== Mathematics ==
- Danish computer scientist Peter Bro Miltersen poses the 100 prisoners problem in probability theory.

== Medicine ==
- February 26 – an American businessman is diagnosed with the first known case of SARS in Hanoi, Vietnam, by WHO doctor Carlo Urbani.
- June – The concept of Acute Traumatic Coagulopathy (ATC) is introduced by Karim Brohi, Professor of Trauma Sciences at Queen Mary University of London.
- October 16 – China becomes the first country to approve the commercial production of a gene therapy.

== Meteorology ==
- NOAA hurricane experts issue first experimental Eastern Pacific Hurricane Outlook.

== Space exploration ==
- February 1 – Space Shuttle Columbia disintegrates over Texas upon reentry killing all seven astronauts on board. Specimens of Caenorhabditis elegans survive.
- June 2 – The first European Mars mission Mars Express launched.
- September 27 – The first European lunar mission Smart 1 launched.
- October 15 – The People's Republic of China launches Shenzhou 5, their first human spaceflight mission.
- December 25 – Mars Express enters orbit around Mars. Its lander, Beagle 2, lands on the surface but is unable to deploy its communications equipment and its fate is discovered only in 2015.

== Technology ==
- March – The world's first digital camera with an organic light-emitting diode (OLED) display is released by Kodak.
- April 24 – Microsoft released a server operating system Windows Server 2003 to manufacturing.
- July 30 – The last old-style Volkswagen Beetle rolls off its production line in Puebla, Puebla, Mexico.
- October 24 – Concorde makes its last flight, bringing the era of civilian supersonic travel to a close for the foreseeable future.
- December 17 – SpaceShipOne, piloted by Brian Binnie, makes its first rocket-powered flight, the first privately built craft to ever achieve supersonic flight.
- Intel releases the Pentium M microprocessor.

== Awards ==
- Nobel Prize
  - Physics: Alexei Alexeevich Abrikosov, Vitaly Lazarevich Ginzburg, and Anthony James Leggett
  - Chemistry: Peter Agre and Roderick MacKinnon
  - Medicine: Paul Lauterbur and Sir Peter Mansfield
- Turing Award for Computing: Alan Kay
- Abel Prize in Mathematics (first award): Jean-Pierre Serre
- Wollaston Medal for Geology: Ikuo Kushiro

== Births ==
- May 4 – Idaho Gem, the first cloned mule.
- May 23 – Dewey, the first cloned deer.
- May 28 – Prometea, the first cloned horse.

== Deaths ==
- February 1 – Astronauts, crew of STS-107
  - Michael P. Anderson (b. 1959), American.
  - David M. Brown (b. 1956), American.
  - Kalpana Chawla (b. 1961), Punjabi-born American.
  - Laurel Clark (b. 1961), American.
  - Rick Husband (b. 1957), American.
  - William C. McCool (b. 1961), American.
  - Ilan Ramon (b. 1954), Israeli.
- February 14 – Dolly (b. 1996), Scottish sheep, the world's first cloned mammal.
- March 29 – Carlo Urbani (b. 1956), Italian physician, discoverer of SARS.
- April 17 – Robert Atkins (b. 1930), American nutritionist.
- April 24 – Nüzhet Gökdoğan (b. 1910), Turkish astronomer and mathematician
- May 10 – Eleanor C. Pressly (b. 1918), American mathematician and aeronautical engineer.
- May 28
  - Oleg Grigoryevich Makarov (b. 1933), Soviet cosmonaut.
  - Ilya Prigogine (b. 1917), Russian-born chemist, Nobel laureate in chemistry.
- September 9 – Edward Teller (b. 1908), Hungarian American physicist, inventor of the hydrogen bomb.
- October 15 – Bertram Brockhouse (b. 1918), Canadian physicist.
- November 15 – Tung-Yen Lin (b. 1912), Chinese-born American civil engineer.
- December 31 – Arthur R. von Hippel (b. 1898), German-born American physicist
