= 2000 in science =

The year 2000 in science and technology involved some significant events.

== Astronomy and space exploration ==
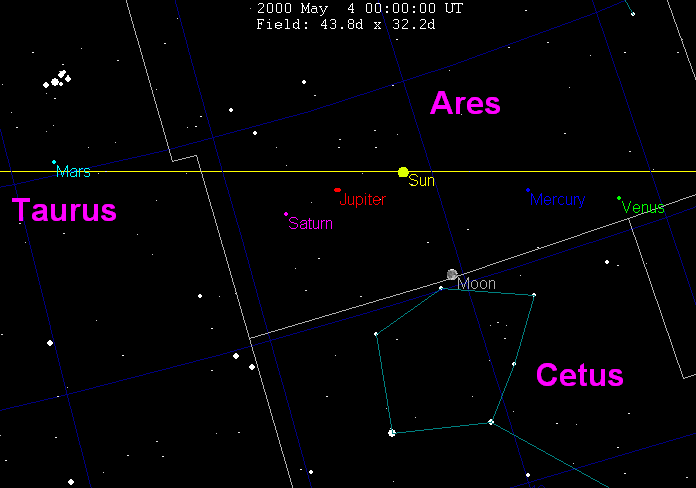
Conjunction of planets, Moon, and Sun on May 4, 2000

- May 4 – A rare astronomical conjunction occurs on the new moon including all seven of the traditional celestial bodies known from ancient times until the discovery of Uranus in 1781; this conjunction consists of the Sun and Moon, Mercury, Venus, Mars, Jupiter and Saturn.
- July 14 – Bastille Day solar storm: A powerful solar flare causes a geomagnetic storm on Earth.
- August 10 – Publication of the M–sigma relation in The Astrophysical Journal.
- November 2 – Expedition 1 to the International Space Station begins.

== Biology ==
- January 6 – The last naturally conceived Pyrenean ibex is found dead, apparently killed by a falling tree.
- June 26 – 'First draft' of the Human Genome Project is announced jointly by President of the United States Bill Clinton and British Prime Minister Tony Blair.
- December 14 – The full genome sequence of the flowering plant Arabidopsis thaliana is published in Nature.
- A population of the Siamese crocodile, previously believed extinct in the wild since 1992, is located in the Cardamom Mountains of Cambodia.
- 10-year Census of Marine Life launched.

== Computer science ==
- January 1 – Year 2000 problem proves to be of little global significance.
- March 4 – Sony Computer Entertainment releases the PlayStation 2 sixth generation home video game console in Japan.
- March 14 – Stephen King's horror story Riding the Bullet is published in e-book format only, the world's first mass-market electronic book.
- May 5 – After originating in the Philippines, the ILOVEYOU computer virus spreads quickly throughout the world.
- September – First system enabling the selection, automatic downloading and storage of serial episodic audio content on PCs and portable devices, origin of the podcast, is launched by early MP3 player manufacturer i2Go.

== Earth sciences ==
- March – Iceberg B-15, with a surface area of 11,000 km^{2} (4,200 sq mi), calves from the Ross Ice Shelf of Antarctica.
- April – Cave of the Crystals discovered at the Naica Mine in Mexico.

== History of science and technology ==
- August 8 – The Confederate States of America submarine H. L. Hunley is raised to the surface after 136 years on the ocean floor.

== Mathematics ==
- Omer Reingold, Salil Vadhan and Avi Wigderson introduce the zig-zag product.

== Medicine ==
- January – Douglas Hanahan and Robert Weinberg publish "The Hallmarks of Cancer".
- January 31 – English doctor Harold Shipman is found guilty of killing fifteen of his elderly patients by lethal injections of diamorphine, the only British physician ever convicted of murdering his patients; he is actually considered to have killed at least 215.
- June 20 – Cardiac surgeon Stephen Westaby and team at the John Radcliffe Hospital in Oxford (England) perform the first successful implant of a permanent electrical artificial heart, a Jarvik 2000 artificial left ventricular assist device, a turbine pump. The patient, psychotherapist Peter Houghton, survives for over 7 years using the machine until his death from unrelated causes.

== Paleontology ==
- First fossil of Orrorin, an early species of Homininae, discovered in the Tugen Hills of Kenya.

== Physics ==
- May 1 – A new class of composite material is fabricated, which has a combination of physical properties never before seen in a natural or human-made material.

== Institutions ==
- November 13 – Museu de les Ciències Príncipe Felipe in Valencia, Spain, opens to the public.

== Awards ==
- Nobel Prizes
  - Physics – Zhores Alferov, Herbert Kroemer - Jack Kilby
  - Chemistry – Alan J Heeger, Alan G MacDiarmid, Hideki Shirakawa
  - Medicine – Arvid Carlsson, Paul Greengard, Eric R. Kandel
- Turing Award: Andrew Yao
- Wollaston Medal for Geology: William Sefton Fyfe

== Deaths ==
- January 12 – Margaret Hutchinson Rousseau (b. 1910), American chemical engineer
- January 19 – G. Ledyard Stebbins (b. 1906), American botanist and geneticist
- March 7 – W. D. Hamilton (b. 1936), English evolutionary biologist, widely recognised as one of the greatest evolutionary theorists of the 20th century
- March 10 – Nim Chimpsky (b. 1973), chimpanzee
- May 6 – John Clive Ward (b. 1924), English-born physicist
- May 19 – Yevgeny Khrunov (b. 1933), cosmonaut
- June 14 – Elsie Widdowson (b. 1908), English nutritionist
- July 8 – W. David Kingery (b. 1926), American materials scientist specializing in ceramic materials
- July 14 – Sir Mark Oliphant (b. 1901), Australian nuclear physicist
- July 29 – René Favaloro (b. 1923), Argentine cardiac surgeon
- September 20 – Gherman Titov (b. 1935), cosmonaut
- October 4 – Michael Smith (b. 1932), English-born Canadian chemist, 1993 Nobel Prize winner
- November 20 – Nikolay Dollezhal (b. 1899), a key figure in Soviet atomic bomb project and chief designer of nuclear reactors
