= Lucille Farrier Stickel =

American wildlife toxicologist

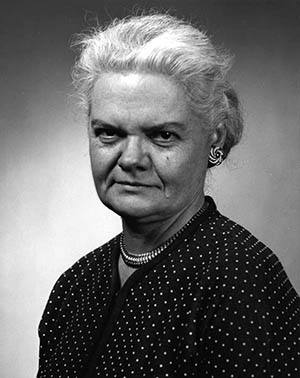
- Born: January 11, 1915; Hillman, Michigan, U.S.
- Died: February 22, 2007 (aged 92); Asheville, North Carolina, U.S.
- Education: Biologist
- Alma mater: University of Michigan
- Known for: Work on wildlife toxicology
- Spouse: William Henson Stickel
- Awards: Federal Women's Award; Distinguished Service Award; Aldo Leopold Memorial Award; Rachel Carson Award

Elizabeth Lucille Farrier Stickel (January 11, 1915 – February 22, 2007), was an American wildlife toxicologist and director of the Patuxent Wildlife Research Center from 1972 to 1982. Her research focused extensively on contaminants in wildlife ecosystems, and her research on the effects of the pesticide DDT helped form the basis for Rachel Carson's book Silent Spring. She was also the first woman to become both a senior scientist as a civil servant of the US government and to be director for a national research laboratory.

== Early life and education ==
=== Childhood and family ===
Elizabeth Lucille Farrier Stickel, known by her close peers as Lucille, was born on January 11, 1915, in Hillman, Michigan. Stickel did not have an easy childhood. She was one of two sisters, and her father died when she was 5 years old due to influenza. As a child, she had a calling for nature. She acquired this love for the environment by allotting most of her free time to outdoor activities including swimming and climbing. She was reported to have climbed to the rooftops of almost all the homes in her small town. She expanded her love for nature as she spent many of her summers at her family cottage on Lake Avalon, close to her hometown, as well as trips to Florida during the winter with her family.

=== Education ===
In the 1920s, Stickel attended Roosevelt High School, a local public school, where she excelled in academics. She was also involved in the girl scouts and high school sports. She was a young, enthusiastic adventurer with a drive for her education. As she approached college, she began to further her career as a scientist. During the depression, her family lost everything. However, that didn’t stop her from pursuing higher education. She continued on to college and maintained a 30 hour work week while also being a full time student.

Lucille Farrier Stickel obtained her Bachelor of Science from Michigan State Normal College, now Eastern Michigan University, in 1936, graduating as a member of Phi Beta Kappa. Stickel went on to teach for one year in Ypsilanti, MI before returning to her education. She went to the University of Michigan for both her master's degree and Ph.D in zoology and acquired them in 1938 and 1949, respectively. In 1941, Stickel's husband, William Henson Stickel, was transferred to Patuxent Research Refuge to work as a wildlife biologist, and Lucille followed. During this time, until 1943, she postponed her doctoral program and worked as a volunteer editor and junior biologist at Patuxent.

== Career ==
=== University of Michigan ===
Stickel returned to her doctoral degree at the University of Michigan in 1943, when her husband was drafted into World War II. During her time at Patuxent as junior biologist, she became interested in the box turtle populations and their home range relationships. Her interest in this turtle population became the subject of her dissertation, which was later titled "Populations and home range of the box turtle, Terrapene carolina (Linnaeus)." She initiated annual studies of this turtle population, and this effort has continued into the present day, amassing over eight decades of data. Her work in population ecology continues through this annual study of turtle populations through collaborations between the United States Geological Survey and the United States Fish and Wildlife Survey.

=== Patuxent Wildlife Research Center ===
The first major publication Stickel made was an environment report in 1946, the first of a number of reports she would make on the ecological effects of the pesticide DDT. She wrote the chapter, "Pesticide Residues in Birds and Mammals," in the book series, Environmental Science Research. In this chapter, she discussed the chemical effects that pesticides that include organochlorine had on birds and mammals. These reports, among the rest of her body of work, helped lead to the creation of wildlife toxicology as a field of study, as the impacts could affect not just wildlife on land, but also in rivers and in the soil. She first joined the Patuxent Wildlife Research Center in 1942 after obtaining her bachelor's degree. Several years later, she took time off in order to accomplish her Ph.D., before returning to work at Patuxent in 1961.

Stickel published her first paper on contamination caused by DDT in 1964. With the work of Stickel, the claims made in Rachel Carson’s Silent Spring were supported. Due to these findings, DDT use was banned by the Environmental Protection Agency in 1972, and the public had a newfound understanding of the detrimental effects of DDT. Because of her contribution to the abolished use of DDT, Stickel made a large impact on the recovery of the bald eagle, whose numbers were declining as a result of DDT, as well as other large raptors like the peregrine falcon. Stickel was then named the director of the facility in 1972, making her the first woman to attain the title of director of a national research laboratory. She retained the position for a decade before retiring in 1982.

== Accolades ==
Stickel was presented the Federal Women's Award by the Department of the Interior in 1968, along with a Distinguished Service Award in 1973. Stickel was also recognized as one of the only female contributors that worked on Biology of Peromycus, in which she worked on the chapter on travels and home ranges. The Wildlife Society awarded Stickel the Aldo Leopold Memorial Award in 1974 for her work on wildlife conservation. In 1980, Stickel would be presented the Special Conservation Award by the National Wildlife Federation. The Society of Environmental Toxicology and Chemistry bestowed her with the Rachel Carson Award in 1998. Stickel was also inducted into the Michigan Women's Hall of Fame in 2014 for her environmental work.

An honorary doctorate was accorded to Stickel by the Eastern Michigan University in 1974. In addition, the Patuxent Wildlife Research Center renamed a chemistry and physiology lab after her and her husband.

== Personal life ==
She was married to William Henson Stickel, also a member of the US Fish and Wildlife Service and a herpetologist. Lucille and William Stickel would later on retire to the mountains near Franklin, North Carolina in March 1982. For many happy years, the Stickels would support the local land conservation efforts while also identifying the different types of flora and fauna that was located on their property and near the area. She died on February 22, 2007, in Asheville, North Carolina.
