= William Hampton Patton =

American entomologist

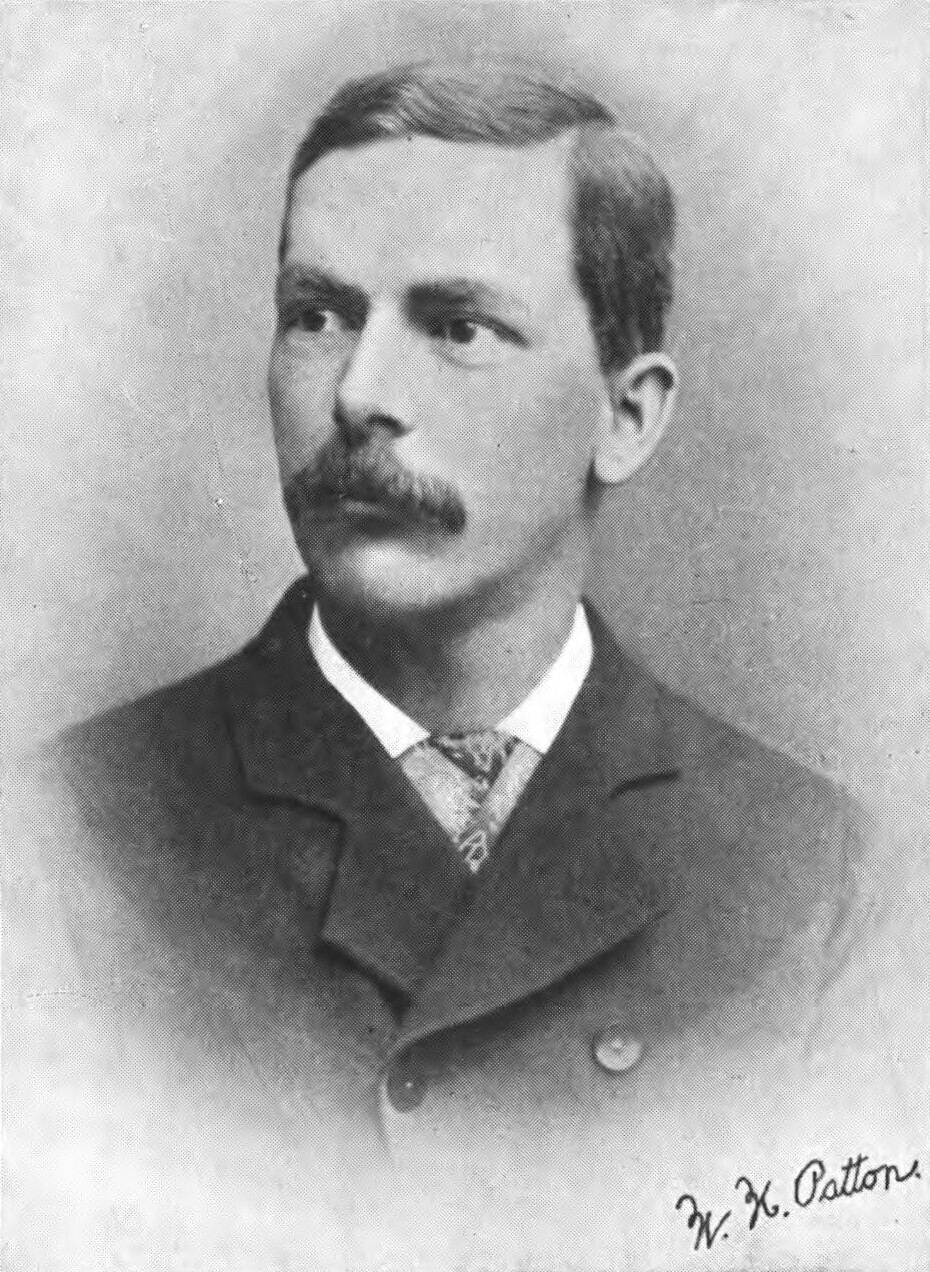
- Born: March 10, 1853; Waterbury, Connecticut, United States
- Died: December 26, 1918 (aged 65); Hartford, Connecticut
- Education: Yale University
- Scientific career
- Fields: Entomology
- Author abbrev. (zoology): Patton

William Hampton Patton (March 10, 1853 – December 26, 1918) was an American entomologist.

== Biography ==
Patton was born on March 10, 1853, at Waterbury, Connecticut, to William and Sarah Frances Patton. He graduated from Waterbury High School in 1870 and prepared for college at the Williston Seminary in Easthampton, Massachusetts. He entered Yale University in 1872 and received a colloquy appointment during his senior year and graduated in 1876. As a post-graduate, he served as an assistant in zoology to Professor Addison Emery Verrill at Yale for two years.

Patton worked as a special agent at the United States Entomological Commission at Washington, D. C. from 1879 to 1881. Drawn by Patton's work in the Canadian Entomologist journal, the U. S. Entomological Commission chairman Dr. Charles Valentine Riley hired Patton as an assistant. In his work, Patton specialized in the Hymenoptera order of insects.

Patton left his work in Washington to take care of his ill father. When Patton's father died, Patton suffered from a breakdown and started acting strangely, eventually ending up as an inmate at the Hartford Retreat. Patton escaped the asylum in 1882 and showed up in Washington where Dr. Riley tried to give him a job at the U. S. Department of Agriculture. After working there for a few days and Patton started acting strangely again and Dr. Riley and Dr. Howard arranged for Patton to be taken back to the asylum in Hartford. Patton was still allowed to keep an insect collection while in the asylum.

Upon the establishment of the State Entomologist office in 1901, Patton wrote a series of letters to its new officeholder, W. E. Britton. The State Entomologist tried to schedule a meeting in Hartford for them to visit. After Patton did not show up, the State Entomologist learned weeks later about Patton's mental instability from Yerrill. Patton died in Hartford on December 26, 1918, as a result of valvular heart disease and arteriosclerosis. He was interred at Riverside Cemetery in Waterbury, Connecticut.

During his lifetime, Patton was a member of the American and British Associations for the Advancement of Science, the Entomological Society of Ontario, and the Connecticut Academy of Science. He was a fellow of the Entomological Society of London and a charter member of the Biological Society of Washington.
