= Alfred Senier =

American chemist (1853–1918)

- Born: 24 January 1853; Burnley, England
- Died: 29 June 1918 (aged 65); Galway, Ireland
- Resting place: Bohermore Cemetery; 53.2769°N 9.0303°W
- Education: Doctor of Medicine, University of Michigan, 1873
- Spouse: Elsbeth Ida Wagner
- Children: Fredericka Denbigh; Elizabeth Mary

Alfred Senier (24 January 1853 – 29 June 1918) was a chemist and a Professor of Chemistry, Queen's College, Galway from 1891 until his death. He was one of the founding members of the Aristotelian Society.

== Life ==
Alfred Senier was born 24 January 1853 in Burnley, England to Alfred Senier (1823–1893) and Jane (née Sutherland). His father, who was born in England, first emigrated to the Territory of Wisconsin in 1844 before returning to England in 1847 to become a pharmacist. He married Jane Sutherland and, in 1853, emigrated once more to Wisconsin, opening a pharmacy in Dover. In 1857, they moved to the nearby village of Mazomanie.

Alfred, Jnr. attended the University of Wisconsin and graduated from the University of Michigan in 1873 as a Doctor of Medicine.

He died 29 June 1918 at the age of 65 in the county infirmary, Galway, Ireland.

== Positions held ==
- 1878 FIC (Fellow of Royal Institute of Chemistry}
- 1874–82 Demonstrator and Asst in Chemistry, Pharmaceutical Society
- 1881–84 Lecturer on Chemistry, St John’s College, Battersea
- 1884–87 Research Student with Professor von Hofmann, Berlin
- 1887 Awarded PhD, University of Berlin
- 1890–91 in charge of Chemistry, Queen’s College, Cork
- 1912 President of the Chemical Section of the British Association
- 1875, 1885 Fellow of Chemical Societies of London and Berlin
- 1884 Hon. Secretary and Treasurer Aristotelian Society (AS), from foundation (1880)
- 1900 Conservator of Fisheries, Galway
- 1902 Hon. Member of the AS
- 1907 MRIA (Member of the Royal Irish Academy)
- Until 1910 Treasurer, from its foundation (1893–94), of University, formerly Queen’s, College Athletic Union.

== Publications ==
- Two academic addresses: A visit to Giessen [or, Thoughts on Liebig and chemistry in Germany] and Bonn on the Rhine [pages from its history and stray thoughts on education] (2 ed.). E Ponsonby. 1910.
- Ueber Cyanursäure: ihre Isomeren und Derivate (Doctoral thesis, Berlin ed.). Berlin. 1887. p. 68.

== Private life ==
Alfred Senier married Elsbeth Ida Wagner (from Prussia) in Croydon in 1887. They had two children: Fredericka Denbigh and Elizabeth Mary. Fredericka married Francis Vernon Breedon, a brassfounder, on 7 June 1916 at St James' Church, Edgbaston.
