= 1914 in science =

The year 1914 in science and technology involved some significant events, listed below.

== Astronomy and space exploration ==
- July 22 – Sinope, the outermost known moon of Jupiter, is discovered by Seth Barnes Nicholson at Lick Observatory.
- A 76 cm refracting telescope is built at Allegheny Observatory in Pittsburgh, Pennsylvania. It is the fifth largest refractor in the world.
- Robert Goddard begins building rockets.
- Walter Sydney Adams determines an incredibly high density for Sirius B.

== Biology and medicine ==
- March 27 – Belgian surgeon Albert Hustin makes the first successful non-direct blood transfusion, using anticoagulants.
- August 1 – Swiss National Park (Parc Naziunal Svizzer) established in the Engadin region of Switzerland.
- September 1 – Martha, the last known passenger pigeon, dies, in the Cincinnati Zoo.
- November 6 – Jacques Loeb publishes a paper on artificial parthenogenesis in sea urchins.
- November 26 – Karl von Frisch publishes his first significant paper on honey bee behavior, "Der Farbensinn und Formensinn der Biene".
- Julian Huxley publishes The Courtship Habits of the Great Crested Grebe, a key text in ethology.
- John Joly develops a method of extracting radium and applying it in radiotherapy.
- Edward Calvin Kendall isolates thyroxine.
- Morris Simmonds first reports hypopituitarism.
- Oxymorphone, a powerful narcotic analgesic closely related to morphine, is first developed in Germany.

== Chemistry ==
- T. W. Richards finds variations between the atomic weight of lead from different mineral sources, attributable to variations in isotopic composition due to different radioactive origins.

== Mathematics ==
- In analysis of the Riemann hypothesis
  - G. H. Hardy shows there are infinitely many zeros on the critical line. Harald Bohr and Edmund Landau show that for any positive ε, all but an infinitely small proportion of zeros lie within a distance ε of the critical line; and R. J. Backlund introduces a better method of checking the zeros.
  - J. E. Littlewood shows that the prime number theorem underestimates the cumulative total of primes.

== Mineralogy ==
- Pascoite is first described.

== Physics ==
- April 24 – James Franck and Gustav Hertz's experiment on electron collisions showing internal quantum levels of atoms is presented to the Deutsche Physikalische Gesellschaft.
- October 1 – Edgar Buckingham introduces use of the symbol "π_{i}" for the dimensionless variables (or parameters) in what becomes known as the Buckingham π theorem, significant to dimensional analysis.
- Ernest Rutherford suggests that the positively charged atomic nucleus contains protons.

== Technology ==
- February 3 – Willis Carrier patents an air conditioner in the United States.
- September 5 – British Royal Navy scout cruiser HMS Pathfinder (1904) is sunk by German submarine U-21 in the Firth of Forth (Scotland), the first ship ever to be sunk by a locomotive torpedo fired from a submarine.
- November 3 – Polly Jacob patents a backless bra in the United States.
- Kodak introduce the Autographic system.

== Other events ==
- October 23 – Manifesto of the Ninety-Three proclaimed in Germany.

== Awards ==
- Nobel Prize
  - Physics – Max von Laue
  - Chemistry – Theodore William Richards
  - Medicine – Robert Bárány

== Births ==
- February 5 – Alan Hodgkin (died 1998), English physiologist, winner of the Nobel Prize in Physiology or Medicine (1963).
- February 22 – Renato Dulbecco (died 2012), Italian-born virologist, winner of the Nobel Prize in Physiology or Medicine (1975).
- March 5 – He Zehui (died 2011), Chinese nuclear physicist.
- March 8 – Yakov Borisovich Zel'dovich (died 1987), Russian astrophysicist.
- March 25 – Norman Borlaug (died 2009), American agronomist, humanitarian and Nobel laureate.
- April 7 – Heinz Billing, German physicist and computer scientist (died 2017)
- May 19 – Max Perutz (died 2002), Austrian-born biologist.
- June 3 – Ignacio Ponseti (died 2009), Menorcan-born pediatric orthopedist.
- June 4 – Alec Skempton (died 2001), English pioneer of soil science and engineering historian.
- July 15 – Gavin Maxwell (died 1969), Scottish naturalist.
- July 24 – Frances Oldham Kelsey (died 2015), Canadian pharmacologist.
- August 13 – Grace Bates (died 1996), American mathematician.
- September 5 – Nicanor Parra (died 2018), Chilean poet and physicist.
- October 2 – Jack Parsons (died 1952), American rocket engineer and occultist.
- October 6 – Thor Heyerdahl (died 2002), Norwegian ethnographer and explorer, leader of the Kon-Tiki expedition.
- October 14 – Raymond Davis Jr. (died 2006), American chemist and physicist, winner of the Nobel Prize in Physics (2002)
- October 20 – James C. Floyd, British-born Canadian aerospace engineer.
- October 21 – Martin Gardner (died 2010), American writer on recreational mathematics.
- October 28
  - Jonas Salk (died 1995), American medical researcher.
  - Richard Laurence Millington Synge (died 1994), English chemist, Nobel Prize laureate.
- December 15 – Anatole Abragam, Russian-born French physicist (died 2011)
- December 20 – Mary Helen Wright Greuter (died 1997), American historian of astronomy.
- December 21 – Frank Fenner (died 2010), Australian virologist and microbiologist.
- December 31 – Mary Logan Reddick (died 1966), African American neuroembryologist.

== Deaths ==
- January 24 – Sir David Gill (born 1843), Scottish astronomer.
- March 19 – Giuseppe Mercalli (born 1850), Italian volcanologist.
- March 30 – John Henry Poynting (born 1852), English physicist, discovered the Poynting–Robertson effect and developed the Poynting vector.
- April 16 – George William Hill (born 1838), American astronomer.
- April 26 – Eduard Suess (born 1831), German geologist and ecologist.
- May 15 – Ida Freund (born 1863), Austrian-born British chemist and educator.
- May 27 – Joseph Swan (born 1828), English physicist.
- September 13 – Robert Hope-Jones (born 1859), English-born inventor of the theatre organ (suicide).
- November 5 – August Weismann (born 1834), German evolutionary biologist.
- November 10 – Lydia Shackleton (born 1828), Irish botanical artist.
- November 28 – Johann Wilhelm Hittorf (born 1824), German physicist.
- December 24 – John Muir (born 1838), Scottish American geologist and ecologist, founder of the Sierra Club.
- December 29 – Johannes Ludwig Janson (born 1849), German veterinary scientist.
