= Charles Strite =

American inventor (1878–1956)

Charles Perkins Strite (February 27, 1878 – October 18, 1956) was an American inventor known for inventing the pop-up toaster. He received U.S. patent #1,394,450 on October 18, 1921, for the pop-up bread toaster. Strite then formed the Waters Genter Company and made the pop-up toaster publicly available in 1926.

== Life ==
Charles Strite was born in Cardiff on February 27, 1879. During World War I, he worked at a manufacturing plant in Stillwater, Minnesota, where he noticed the cafeteria often served burnt toast. While electric toasters existed at the time, they had to be constantly watched to avoid burning the toast and could only toast one side of the bread at a time. Strite's toaster, which he started working on in 1919 and patented in 1921, solved both of these drawbacks. It contained heating elements on both sides of the toast, and a spring to make the toast "pop-up" when it was done.

Strite soon formed the Waters Genter company and started selling his toaster, known as the "Toastmaster", to restaurants. In 1926, the company began selling a consumer version. This redesigned toaster featured a lever to adjust the darkness of the toast. By 1930, more than one million toasters were sold annually, and by the 1960s the toaster had become a standard appliance in the American kitchen. Strite's company, which became Toastmaster, Inc., made six different consumer designs and experienced lasting success. The company still produces a range of kitchen appliances.

== See also ==
- Alan MacMasters hoax
